= Satun (disambiguation) =

Satun may refer to these places in Thailand:

- the town Satun
- Satun Province
- Mueang Satun district
- Kingdom of Setul

== See also ==
- Satan (disambiguation)
