= Ko Lipe =

Island in the Andaman Sea

Native name: เกาะหลีเป๊ะ
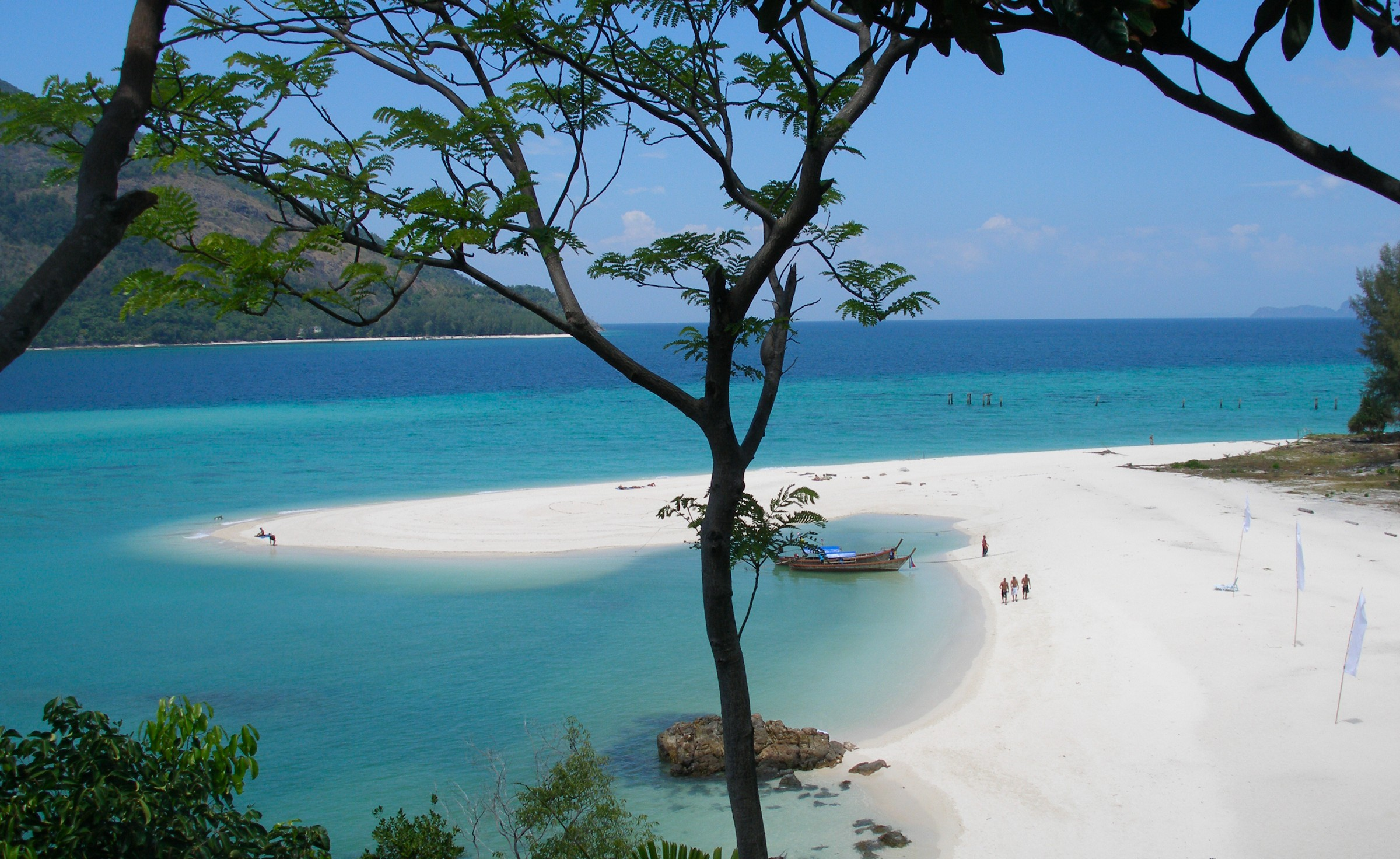
- Ko Lipe beach
- Interactive map of Ko Lipe

Geography
- Location: Strait of Malacca
- Coordinates: 6°29′21.8″N 99°18′6.4″E
- Archipelago: Adang Archipelago
- Area: 2 km^{2} (0.77 sq mi)

Administration
- Thailand
- Province: Satun
- District: Mueang Satun
- Tambon: Ko Sarai

Demographics
- Population: 1,210 (2012)
- Languages: Urak Lawoi’, Malay, Thai, Southern Thai
- Ethnic groups: Urak Lawoi

Additional information
- Time zone: ICT (UTC+7)
- Postal code: 91000

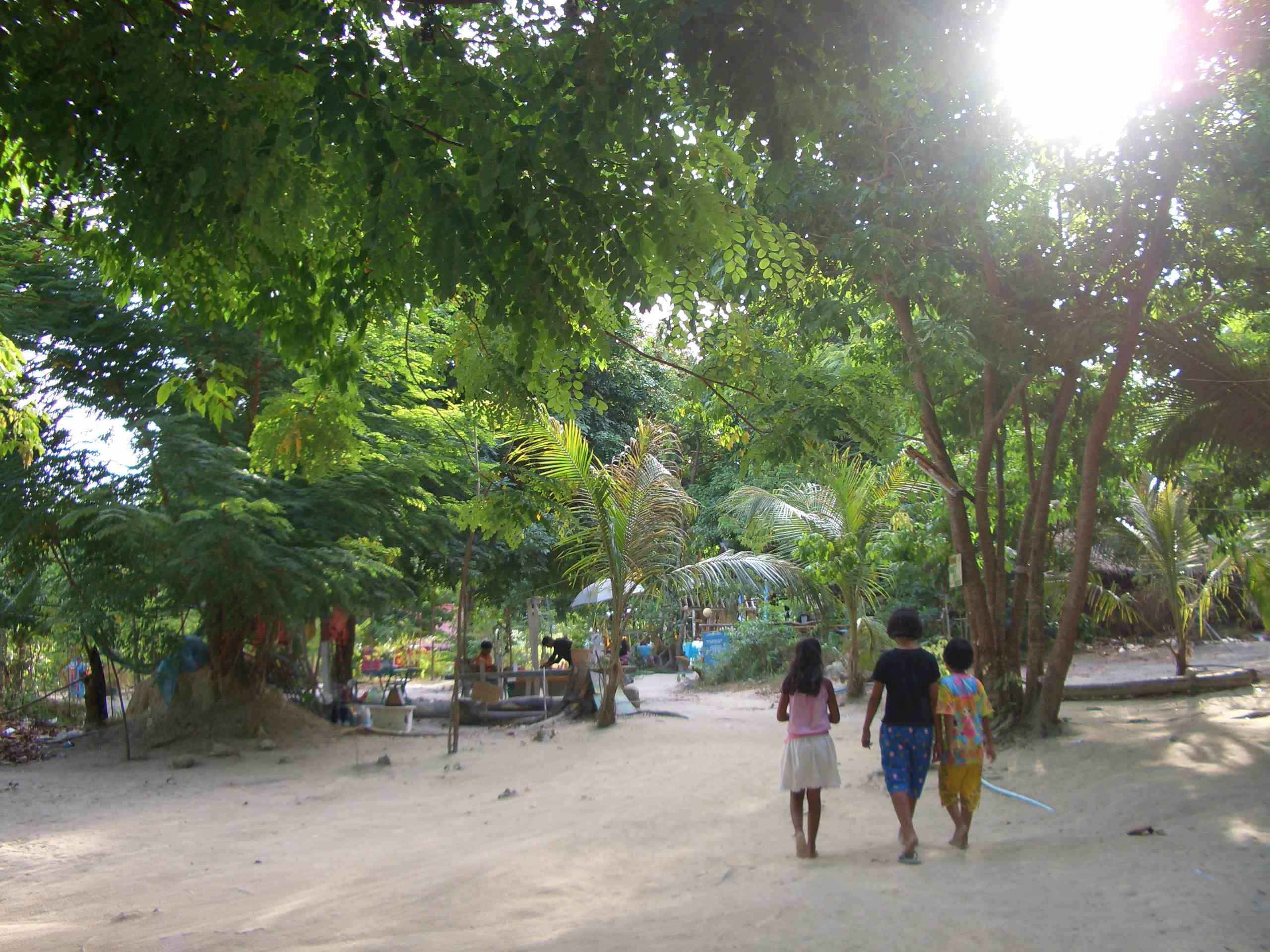
Inland Ko Lipe

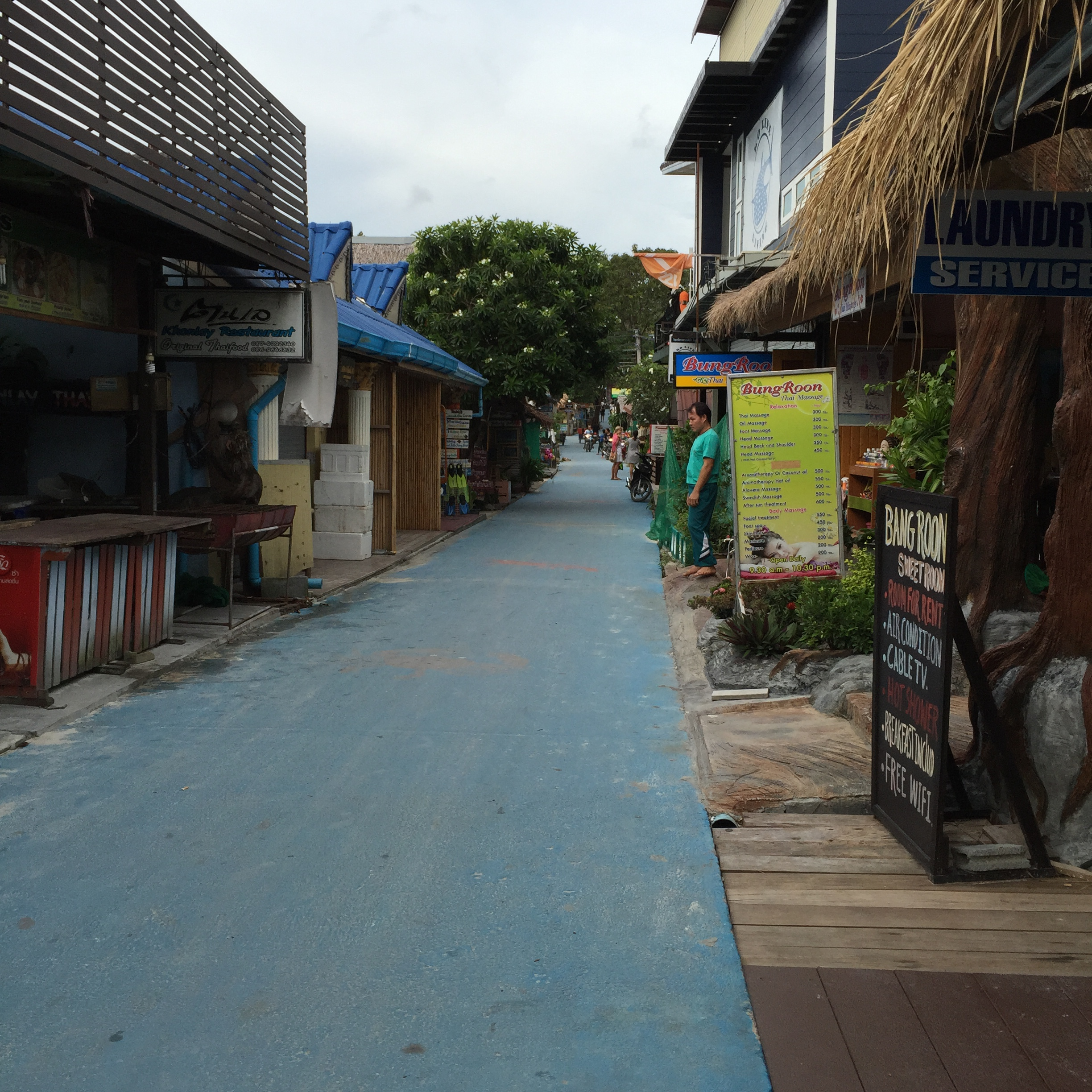
Walking street

Ko Lipe (Thai: เกาะหลีเป๊ะ, pronounced [kɔ̀ʔ lǐːpéʔ]) is a small island in the Adang-Rawi Archipelago of the Strait of Malacca, in Satun Province of southwest Thailand, close to the Malaysian border. Its Thai name, the corrupted form of the original Malay name, Pulau Nipis ('thin island') is also transliterated into English as "Koh Lipe", "Koh Lipeh", and "Ko Lipey".

Ko Lipe is on the border of the Tarutao National Marine Park and is directly south of the larger islands Ko Adang and Ko Rawi, and about 50 km from the island of Ko Tarutao. It was originally settled by a group of Malayic-speaking people, sea gypsies (chao leh in Thai and 'orang laut' in Malay), known as the Urak Lawoi’ people.

The islands economy is largely centered around tourism, especially because of its white sandy beaches and scuba diving.

== Access ==
During high season (October to June), there are several locations from which travellers can take a ferry or speedboat to Ko Lipe, including: Ko Lanta, Pak Bara, Phi Phi, Trang, and Langkawi (Malaysia). During low season (Mid June to mid October), the only way to get to Ko Lipe is by speedboat from Pak Bara.

The 90 minute ferry from Langkawi to Ko Lipe operates 1-2 times per day from mid October until mid May, from the Kuah Jetty Terminal or Telaga Harbour Terminal in Langkawi. From Ko Lipe, travellers can depart & arrive at Bundhaya Resort or Pattaya Beach.

== Tourism ==
Ko Lipe has three main beaches which are Sunset Beach (Hat Pramong), Sunrise Beach (Hat Chao Ley), and Pattaya Beach. The calm, clear water makes Ko Lipe ideal for snorkeling, with 25% of the world's tropical fish species found in the area.

== Environmental concerns ==
Development on the island is rapidly growing to meet the increase in tourism, leading to issues with waste management, wildlife conservation, and energy supplies. The parks department is trying to control the amount of building on Lipe as many developers have built resorts on National Park land. Upon arrival at Ko Lipe, visitors are charged with National Park admission fee and environmental fee.

== Activity ==
Popular activities for visitors includes scuba diving, snorkeling, kayaking, boat trips to nearby islands and reefs such as Ko Usen and Ko Kra and drinking and dining, particularly fresh seafood on walking street.

Visitors take in sunrise views on Sunrise beach and partake in nightlife on Pattaya Beach.
