= Urak Lawoi =

Ethnicity of Thailand

Urak Lawoiʼ
Total population
- 3,000

Regions with significant populations
- Southern Thailand

Languages
- Urak Lawoi’, Malay, Thai

Religion
- Traditional religion, Theravada Buddhism, Islam

Urak Lawoi (Malay: Orang Laut; Thai: อูรักลาโว้ย; RTGS: Urak Lawoi; Urak Lawoi': อูรักลาโวยจ) are an aboriginal Austronesian people residing on the islands of Phuket, Phi Phi, Jum, Lanta, Bulon and on Lipe and Adang, in the Adang Archipelago, off the western coast of Thailand. They are known by various names, including Orak Lawoiʼ, Lawta, Chao Tha Le (ชาวทะเล), Chao Nam (ชาวน้ำ), and Lawoi.

The population of approximately 6,000 speak a language related closely to Malay but influenced by Thai. The Urak Lawoi are one of several Austronesian ethnicities referred to as "Sea Gypsies" (chao leh in Thai). The local way of life has been changing rapidly in recent years, due to the rapid encroachment of the market economy, and the opening of Tarutao National Marine Park. They have largely not benefited from the tourism boom on Ko Lipe, where in many cases families were forced from their land by both legal and illegal means. In 2022, it was reported that 125 families, or half of the Urak Lawoi community on Lipe had lost the legal title to their land, and were illegally occupying it, leading to conflict with resort operators and developers.

== See also ==
- Sea Gypsies (disambiguation)
