= Cyrtodactylus stellatus =

Scientific classification
- Kingdom: Animalia
- Phylum: Chordata
- Class: Reptilia
- Order: Squamata
- Suborder: Gekkota
- Family: Gekkonidae
- Genus: Cyrtodactylus
- Species: C. stellatus

Binomial name
- Cyrtodactylus stellatus Termprayoon, Rujirawan, Ampai, Wood Jr., & Aowphol, 2021

Species of lizard

Cyrtodactylus stellatus is a species of gecko, a lizard in the family Gekkonidae. The species is endemic to Ko Tarutao, Thailand.
