= Sakra Kapilkan =

Thai politician

- ศักระ กปิลกาญจน์

Governor of Satun Province
- Incumbent
- Assumed office 18 September 2023
- Preceded by: Ekkarat Leesen

Sakra Kapilkan (Thai: ศักระ กปิลกาญจน์, RTGS: Sakkara Kapinlakan) (Note: Other spellings include Sakara Kapilkan, and Sakra Kapilakarn) is a Thai civil servant, serving as the governor of Satun Province. He previously served as the governor of Ranong Province.

== Career ==
Sakra oversaw the provincial response to the 2024 Southern Thailand floods.
