= Satun province =

Coordinates: 6°37′26″N 100°04′01″E

Satun สตูล
- Province
- Satun province

Other transcription(s)
  - Kedah Malay: Setoi (Rumi)
  - Standard Malay: Setul (Rumi) ستول (Jawi)
  - Southern Thai: สตูล (pronounced [sàʔ.tûːn])
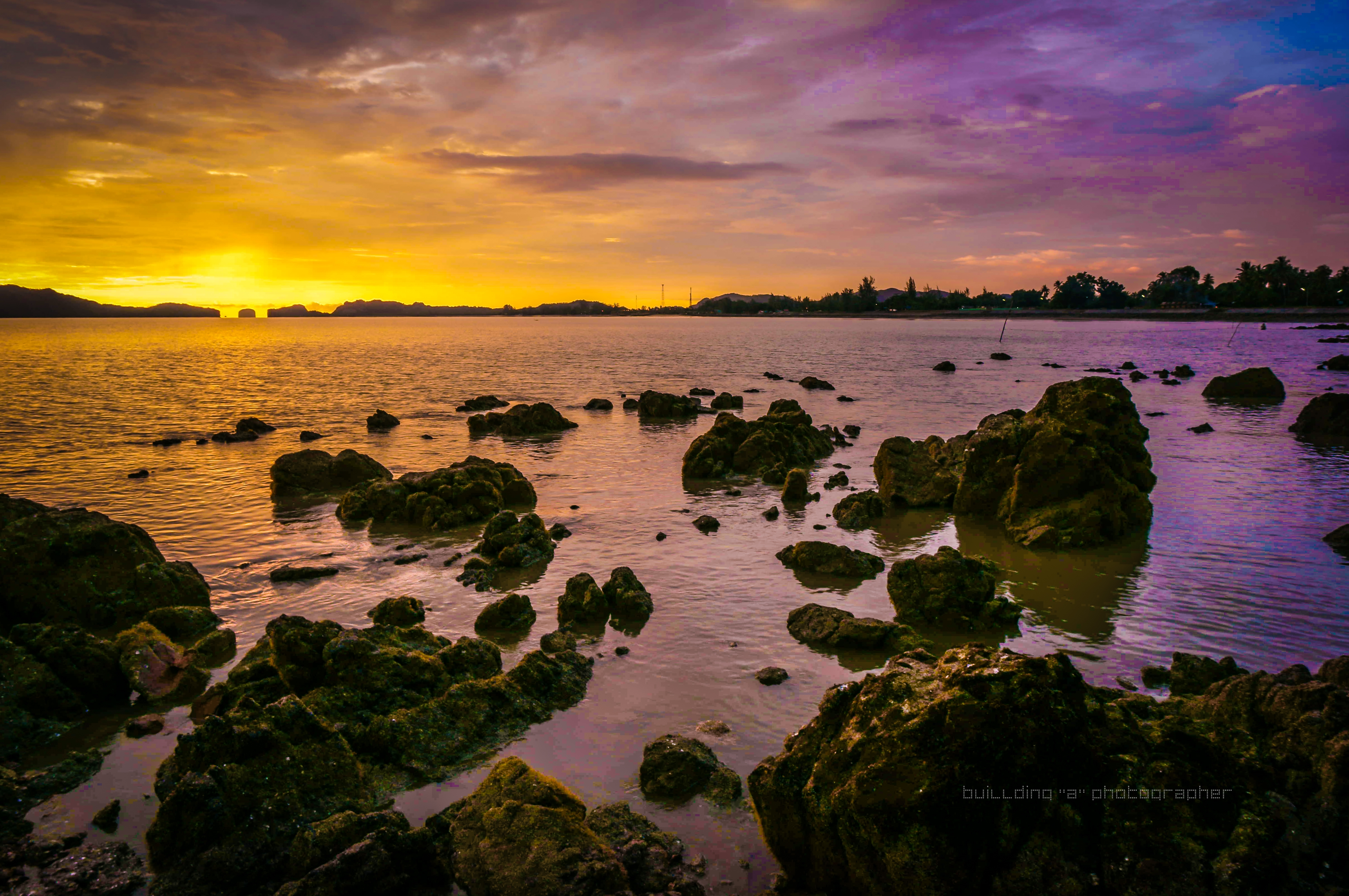
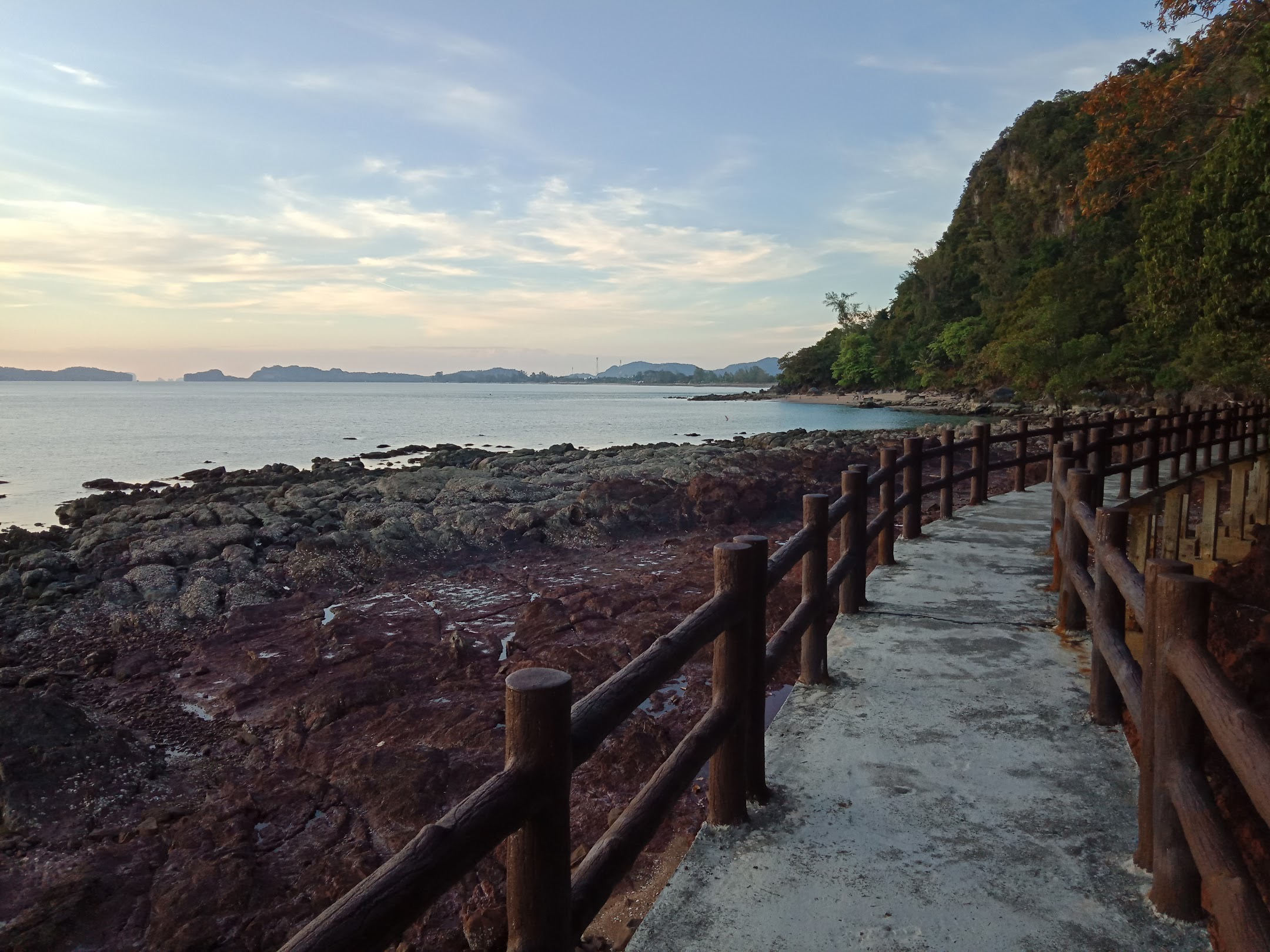
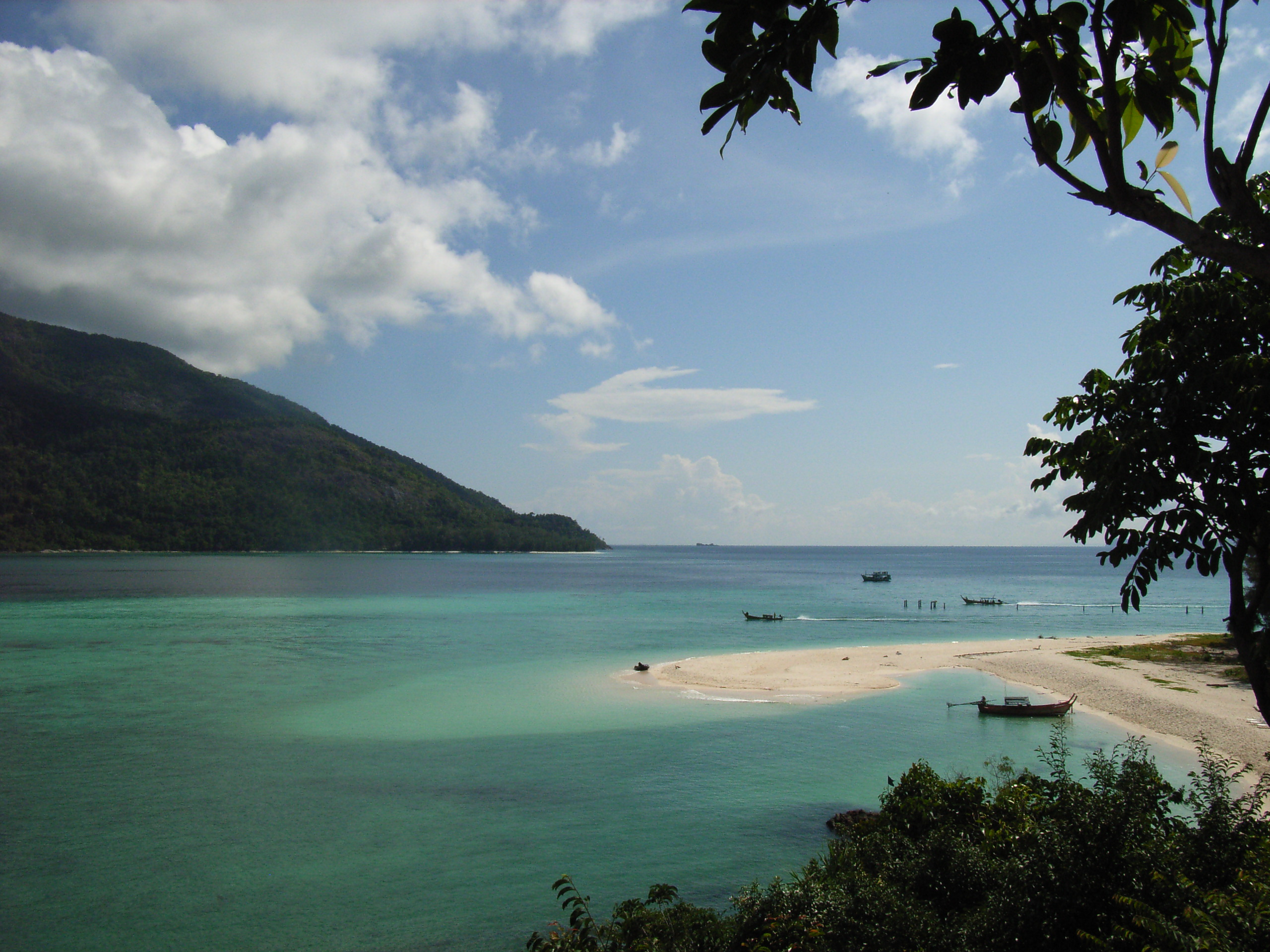
- La-ngu seaside Bridge to time traveling zone position, Mu Ko Phetra National Park Ko Lipe beach

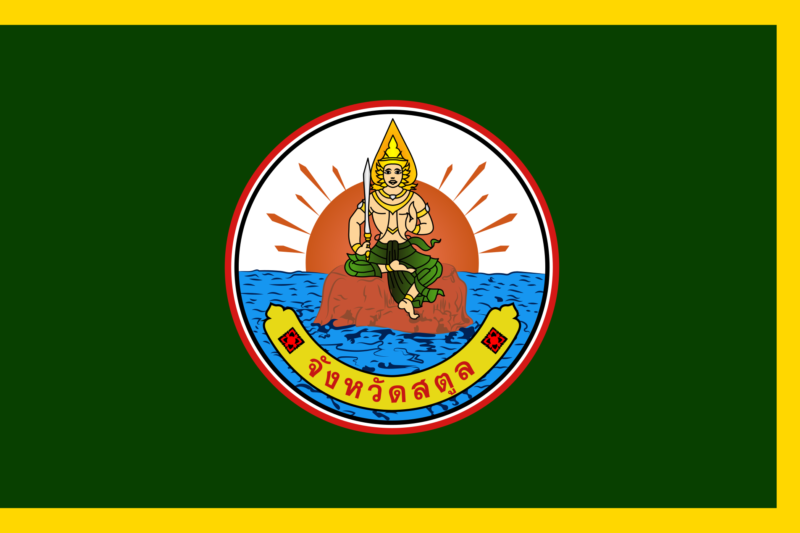
- Flag Seal
- Mottoes: สตูล สงบ สะอาด ธรรมชาติบริสุทธิ์ ("Satun, Peaceful, Clean, Pure Nature")
- Map of Thailand highlighting Satun province
- Country: Thailand
- Capital: Satun

Government
  - Governor: Sakra Kapilkan

Area
  - Total: 3,019 km^{2} (1,166 sq mi)
  - Rank: 62nd

Population (2024)
  - Total: ▲324,879
  - Rank: 67th
  - Density: 108/km^{2} (280/sq mi)
  - Rank: 46th

Human Achievement Index
  - HAI (2022): 0.6336 "somewhat low" Ranked 48th

GDP
  - Total: baht 37 billion (US$1.0 billion) (2019)
- Time zone: UTC+7 (ICT)
- Postal code: 91xxx
- Calling code: 074
- ISO 3166 code: TH-91
- Website: satun.go.th

Satun Provincial Administrative Organization องค์การบริหารส่วนจังหวัดสตูล
- Provincial Administrative Organization
- Interactive map of Satun Provincial Administrative Organization

Government
  - Type: Local administrative divisions
  - Body: Satun Provincial Administrative Organization
  - President: Samrit Liangprasit
- Website: satunpao.go.th

Satun (Thai: สตูล, pronounced [sà.tūːn]; Malay: Setul) is one of the southern provinces (changwat) of Thailand. Neighboring provinces are (from north clockwise) Trang, Phatthalung, and Songkhla. To the south it borders Perlis of Malaysia at Wang Prachan (Malay: Wang Belacan).

== Toponymy ==
The name Satun is a Thai version of its original Malay name, Setul (santol, or wild mangosteen tree). The latter word's counterparts in Northern Malay and Urak Lawoi are Setoi and Setun respectively.

== History ==
Two cave sites in the province, Tham Yi Mit and Khao Kao, are recorded in Siriporn Sanghiran's survey of thirty-five archaeological sites on the lower peninsula.

In 1897 Satun became part of Monthon Syburi (now Kedah), which in 1909 was divided between British Empire and Siam as part of Anglo-Siamese Treaty of 1909. While most of Kedah was ceded to Britain, Satun was awarded to Siam because it had a relatively large Thai population. Satun was then incorporated into Monthon Phuket. The monthon system was ended in 1933, and Satun province became a first-level subdivision of Thailand. Until 1916 Satun was a small Malay state known as Kingdom of Setul Mambang Segara, closely associated to the Kedah Sultanate. After that date it was administered by a governor sent from Nakhon Si Thammarat.

The province was to have been the site of the Pak Bara Deep-seaport in La-ngu District.

== Symbols ==
The provincial seal shows Phra Samut Thewa (समुद्र देवा Samudra Deva, "God of the ocean") sitting on a rock in the sea, with the sunset behind. Phra Samut Thewa is a spirit who guards the sea. The rock is his divine vehicle. The sunset symbolizes the Andaman Sea, which lies to the west of the province.

The provincial tree is the Thai Rosewood (Dalbergia bariensis), in Thai known as Pha-yungklaep and Malay as Tamalan; and the provincial flower is the Snowy Orchid Tree (Bauhinia acuminata). The provincial aquatic life is the ocellaris clownfish (Amphiprion ocellaris). The province's motto is Peaceful, clean, and pure nature.

== Geography ==
The province is on the Malay Peninsula, on the shore of the Andaman Sea. It is separated from Songkhla province by the Nakhon Si Thammarat mountain range, and from Malaysia by the Nakawan Range. The total forest area is 1,212 km^{2} (468 sq mi) or 40.1 percent of provincial area.

The Ko Tarutao and Ko Phetra marine national parks are part of the province. Close to the border with Malaysia is the Thale Ban National Park, a big freshwater swamp area.

The three groups of offshore islands in the Andaman Sea form the Ko Sarai (Thai: เกาะสาหร่าย, pronounced [kɔ̀ʔ sǎːràːj]) subdistrict (tambon) of Mueang Satun District. It is composed of 3 island groups, totaling 243 km^{2} in area, had a population of 5,077 as of 2012. The biggest village is Ban Ko Sarai (sometimes called Ban Yaratot Yai), on the island with the same name of 13 km^{2}, but the largest islands are Ko Tarutao (163 km^{2}) closer to the mainland and the Ko Adang-Ko Rawi group (67 km^{2}) further west. The population relies on fishing, agriculture and tourism.

=== National parks ===
There are three national parks, along with seventeen other national parks, make up region 5 (Nakhon Si Thammarat) of Thailand's protected areas.

Tarutao National Park	1,490 km^{2} (580 sq mi)	(241,968)
Mu Ko Phetra National Park	494 km^{2} (191 sq mi)	(154,285)
Thale Ban National Park	196 km^{2} (76 sq mi)	(9,053)

=== Wildlife sanctuaries ===
Two wildlife sanctuaries are in region 6 (Songkhla).

Khao Banthat Wildlife Sanctuary	1,267 km^{2} (489 sq mi)
Ton Nga Wildlife Sanctuary	182 km^{2} (70 sq mi)

=== Non-hunting areas ===
There are a total of nine non-hunting areas in region 5 (Nakhon Si Thammarat), of which one is in Satun province.

Nong Plak Phraya-Khao Raya Bangsa	20 km^{2} (7.7 sq mi)

Location protected areas of Satun

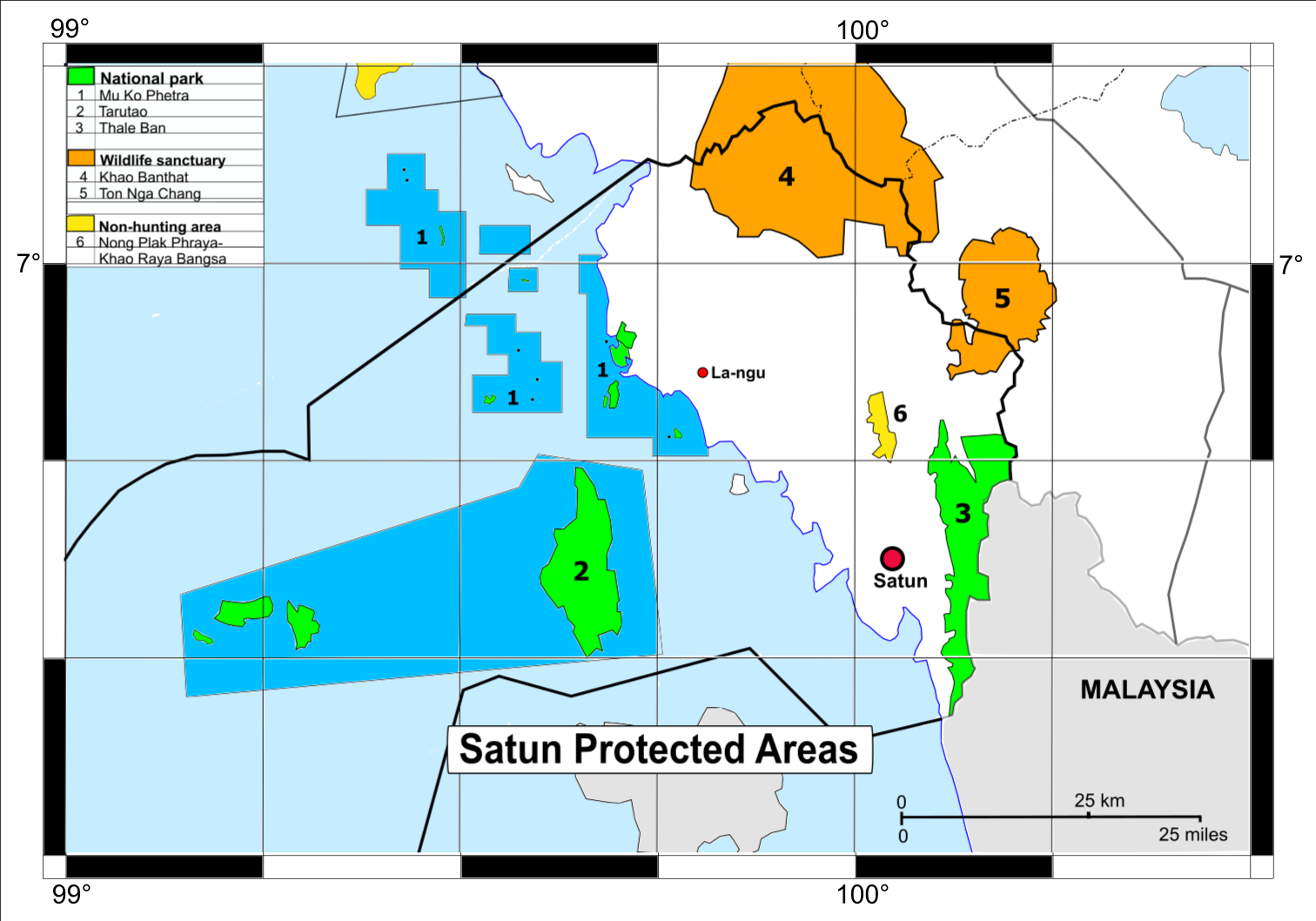
Satun protected areas

	National park
1	Mu Ko Phetra
2	Tarutao
3	Thale Ban

	Wildlife sanctuary
4	Khao Banthat
5	Ton Nga Chang

	Non-hunting area
6	Nong Plak Phraya- Khao Raya Bangsa

== Demographics ==
Religion in Satun (2017)
religion	percent
Islam	76.77%
Buddhism	23.02%
Other	0.21%

Unlike Narathiwat, Yala, and Pattani, Satun are also one of the four provinces of Thailand which have a Muslim majority: 76.77 percent are Muslim and 23.02 percent are Buddhists., However only 9.9 percent of the present-day population speaks Malay as their mother tongue due to the result of an effective language shift from Malay to Southern Thai amongst its populace. The primary language in Satun province is Southern Thai, and most of people refer themselves as Thai muslim ethnicity rather Malays,

Satun does not have a history of political confrontation with the central power in Bangkok or of tension with the Buddhist population which makes up the majority of Thailand as a country. Muslims in Satun are substantially assimilated and rarely sympathise with separatism from Thailand, in contrast to the Malay Muslims in Pattani, Narathiwat, and Yala.

The Malay dialect used in Satun is distinctly different from Patani Malay and is much closer to the Kedah dialect of Malay.

Since Satun had belonged to the Kedah Sultanate, which had a strong relationship for many centuries with both Ayutthaya and Siam under the Chakri dynasty, its Malay Muslims commonly intermarry with Thai Buddhists without serious religious hesitation. This custom has created a distinct social group known as samsam, meaning a person of mixed Thai-Malay ancestry. Most samsams, if not all, are Muslims.

== Administrative divisions ==
=== Provincial government ===
Satun is divided into seven districts (amphoe). These are further divided into 36 subdistricts (tambon) and 277 villages (muban).

Map with seven districts	No.	Name	Thai	Malay	Jawi
Map with seven districts	1	Mueang Satun	เมืองสตูล	Mambang	ممبڠ
Map with seven districts	2	Khuan Don	ควนโดน	Dusun	دوسون
Map with seven districts	3	Khuan Kalong	ควนกาหลง	Padang Kecil	ڤادڠ كچيل
Map with seven districts	4	Tha Phae	ท่าแพ	Berakit	براكيت
Map with seven districts	5	La-ngu	ละงู	Laut	لا ٔوت
Map with seven districts	6	Thung Wa	ทุ่งหว้า	Sungai Upeh	سوڠاي اوڤيه
Map with seven districts	7	Manang	มะนัง	Bendang	بندڠ

Originally, the province was divided into two districts, Mambang and Thung Wa, and the minor district (king amphoe) La-ngu. Due to the decline of pepper production in Thung Wa District, in 1930 the government made Thung Wa a minor district and instead declared La-ngu a district. In 1939 Mambang was renamed to Mueang Satun. Khuan Kalong was split off from Mueang district in 1969, from which in turn Tha Pae was split in 1976 and Manang in 1996. In 1973 Thung Wa regained district status. Khuan Don was established in 1975 by splitting it from Mueang district.

=== Local government ===
As of 26 November 2019 there are: one Satun Provincial Administration Organisation (ongkan borihan suan changwat) and 7 municipal (thesaban) areas in the province. Satun has town (thesaban mueang) status. Further 6 subdistrict municipalities (thesaban tambon). The non-municipal areas are administered by 34 Subdistrict Administrative Organisations - SAO (ongkan borihan suan tambon).

== Economy ==
According to a Satun Provincial Office spokesman, the province's tourism income rose from two to 6.3 billion baht from 2010 to 2013, while tourist arrivals increased from 690,000 to 1.13 million.

The Department of Airports announced in October 2018 that it will conduct a feasibility study of an airport in the province. Six million baht is allocated for the study, to be completed in September 2019.

== Transportation ==
Satun is connected to Langkawi, Malaysia by direct ferry service.

== Human achievement index 2022 ==
Health	Education	Employment	Income
28	42	76	58
Housing	Family	Transport	Participation
37	73	15	7
Province Satun, with an HAI 2022 value of 0.6336 is "somewhat low", occupies place 48 in the ranking.

Since 2003, United Nations Development Programme (UNDP) in Thailand has tracked progress on human development at sub-national level using the Human achievement index (HAI), a composite index covering all the eight key areas of human development. National Economic and Social Development Board (NESDB) has taken over this task since 2017.

Rank	Classification
1 - 13	"high"
14 - 29	"somewhat high"
30 - 45	"average"
46 - 61	"somewhat low"
62 - 77	"low"

Map with provinces and HAI 2022 rankings

== National parks ==
- Mu Ko Phetra National Park is a marine national park in the Strait of Malacca off Thailand, covering mostly intact coastal line, open water, and about 30 islands of the southern part of Trang province and the northern part of Satun province. Established on 31 December 1984, it is the 49th national park and 14th marine national park of Thailand.
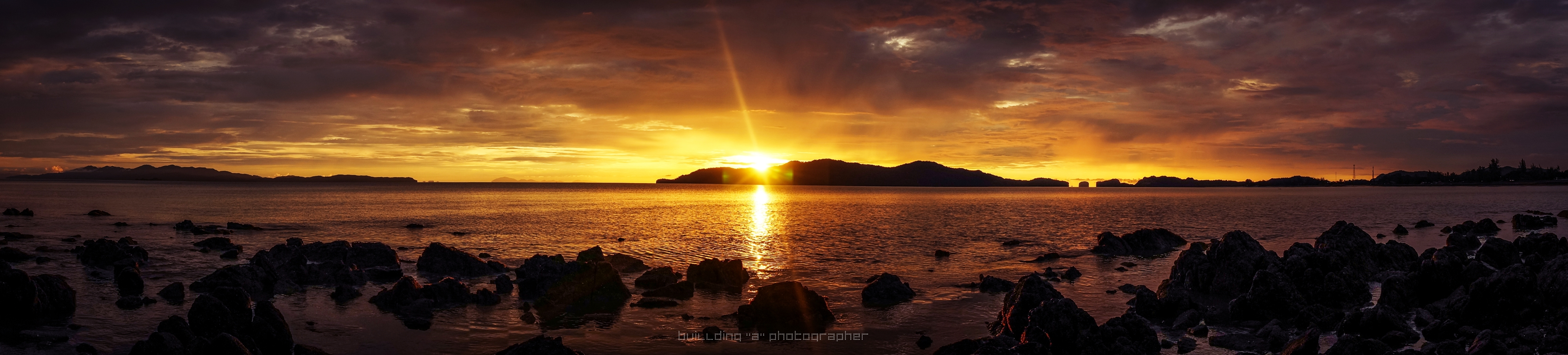
Panoramic view of the Mu Ko Phetra National Park
Mu Ko Phetra National Park
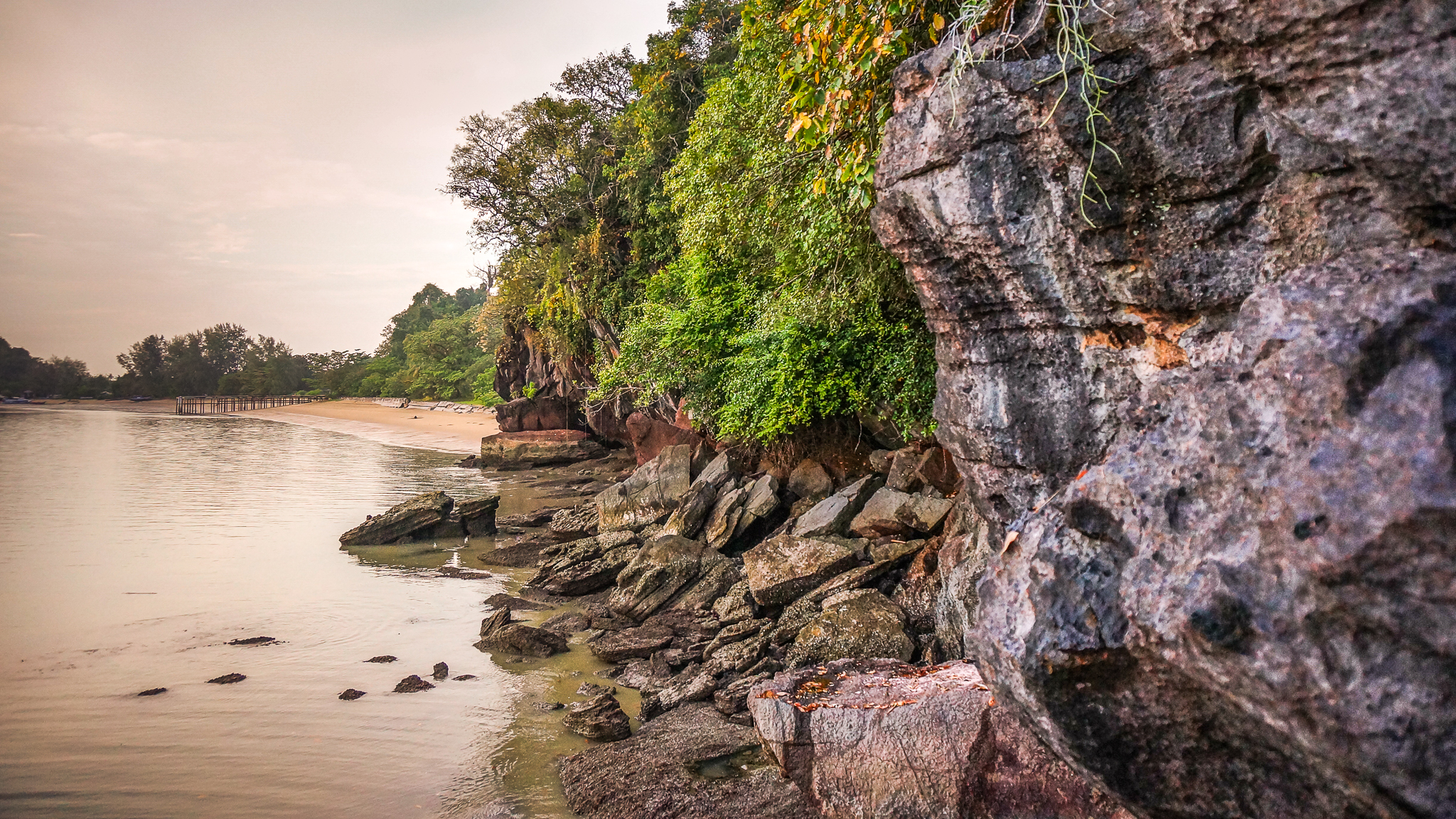

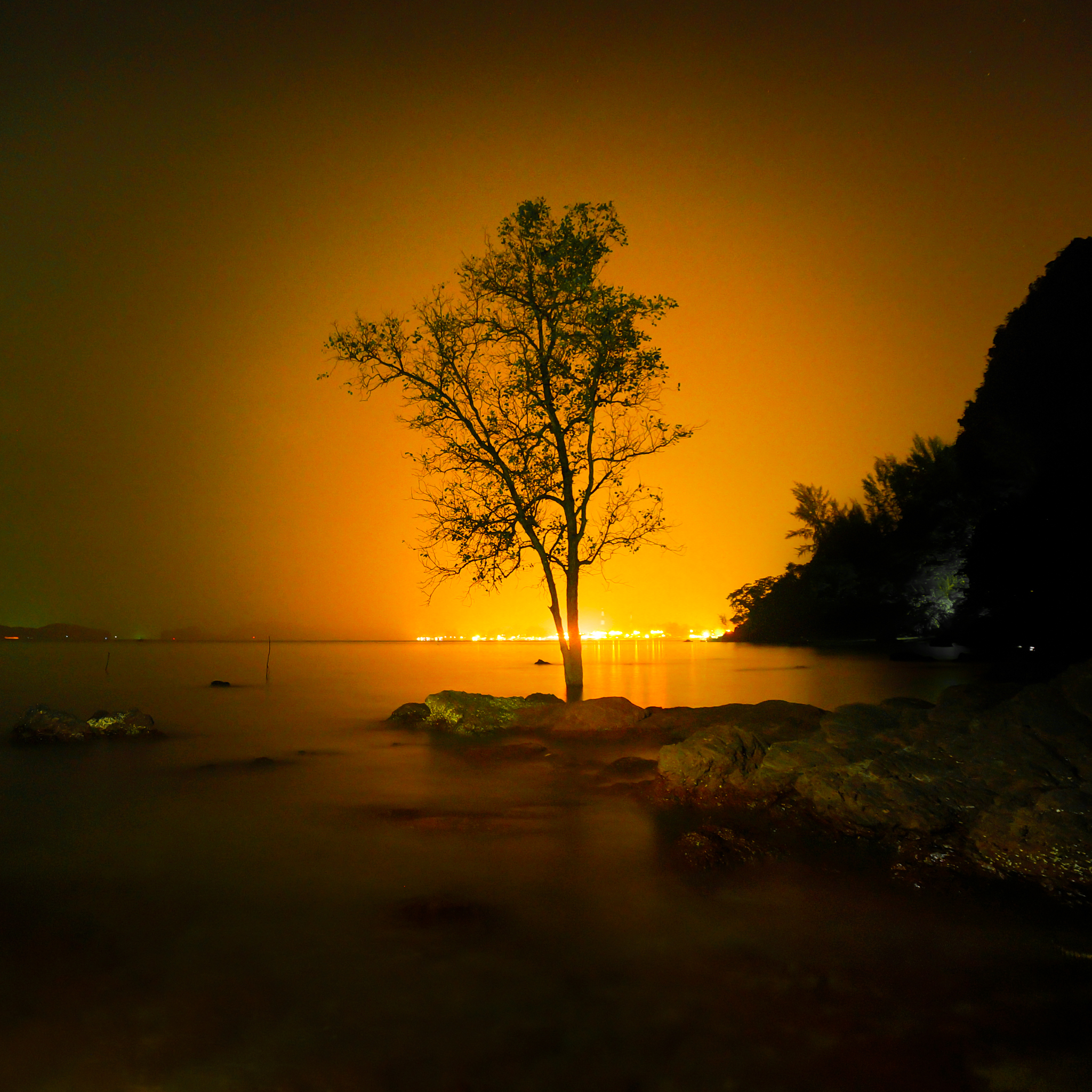

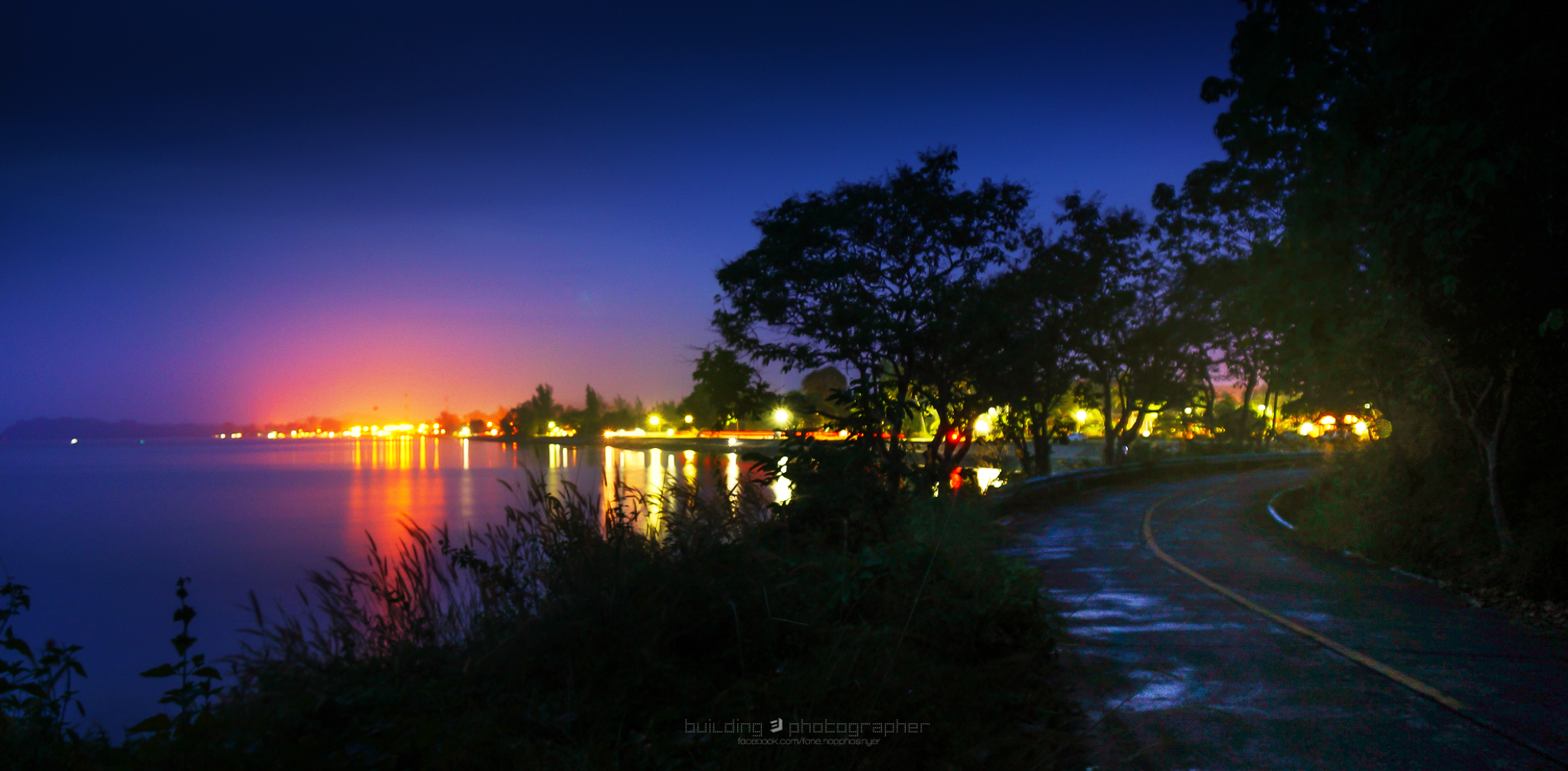
- Thale Ban National Park is a forested area south of the Banthat Mountains in southern Thailand, in the south of Satun province bordering Malaysia; it borders Taman Negeri Perlis park. The park was established on 27 October 1980. It covers an area of 196 square kilometres (76 square miles) of Khuan Don and Mueang Satun districts.
- Tarutao National Park is Thailand's second marine national park on 19 April 1974. The coastal Khao Sam Roi Yot National Park had been designated in 1966.

== Gallery ==
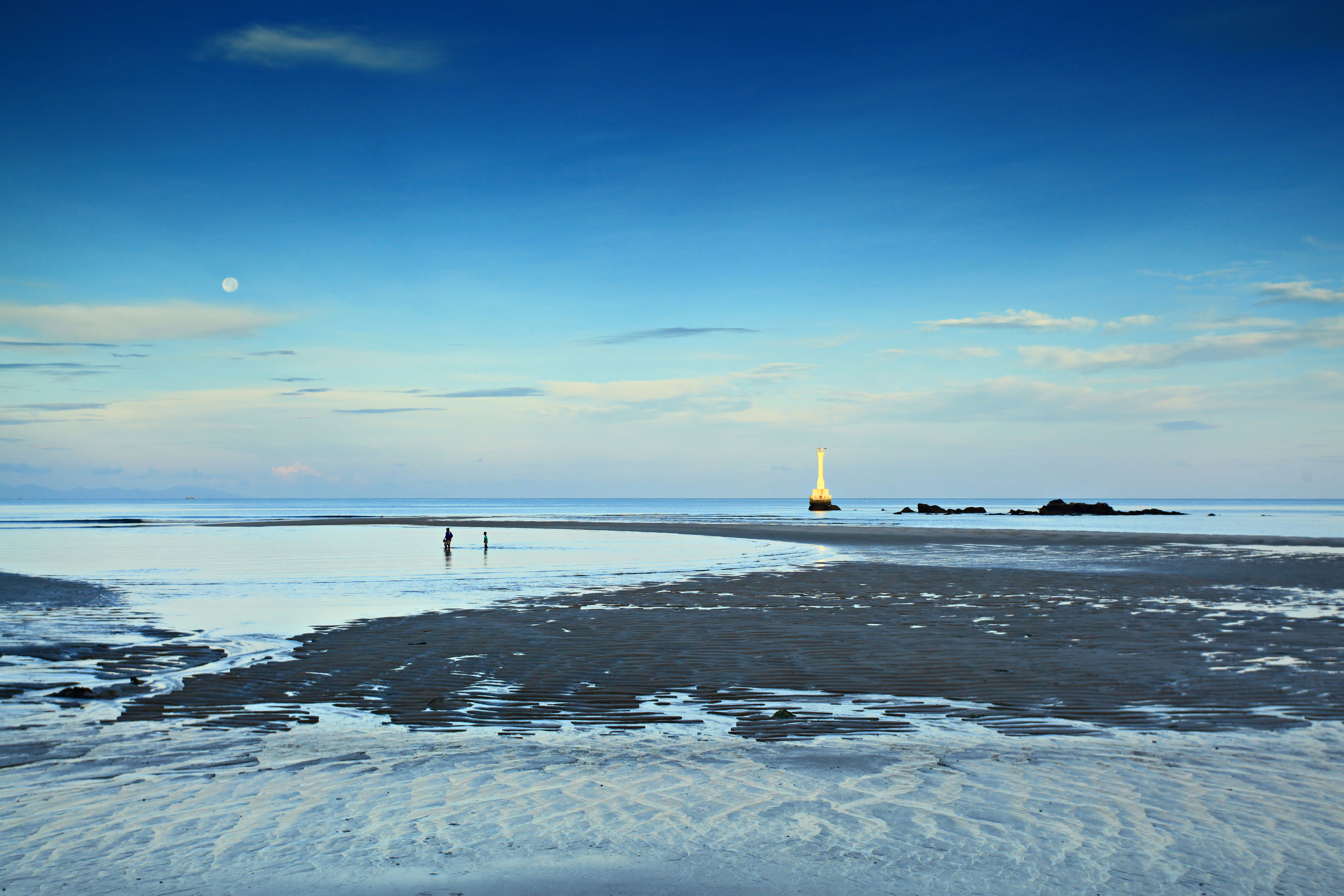
The seashore with a lighthouse and the Moon in the distance, Phante Malaka Bay, Tarutao National Park

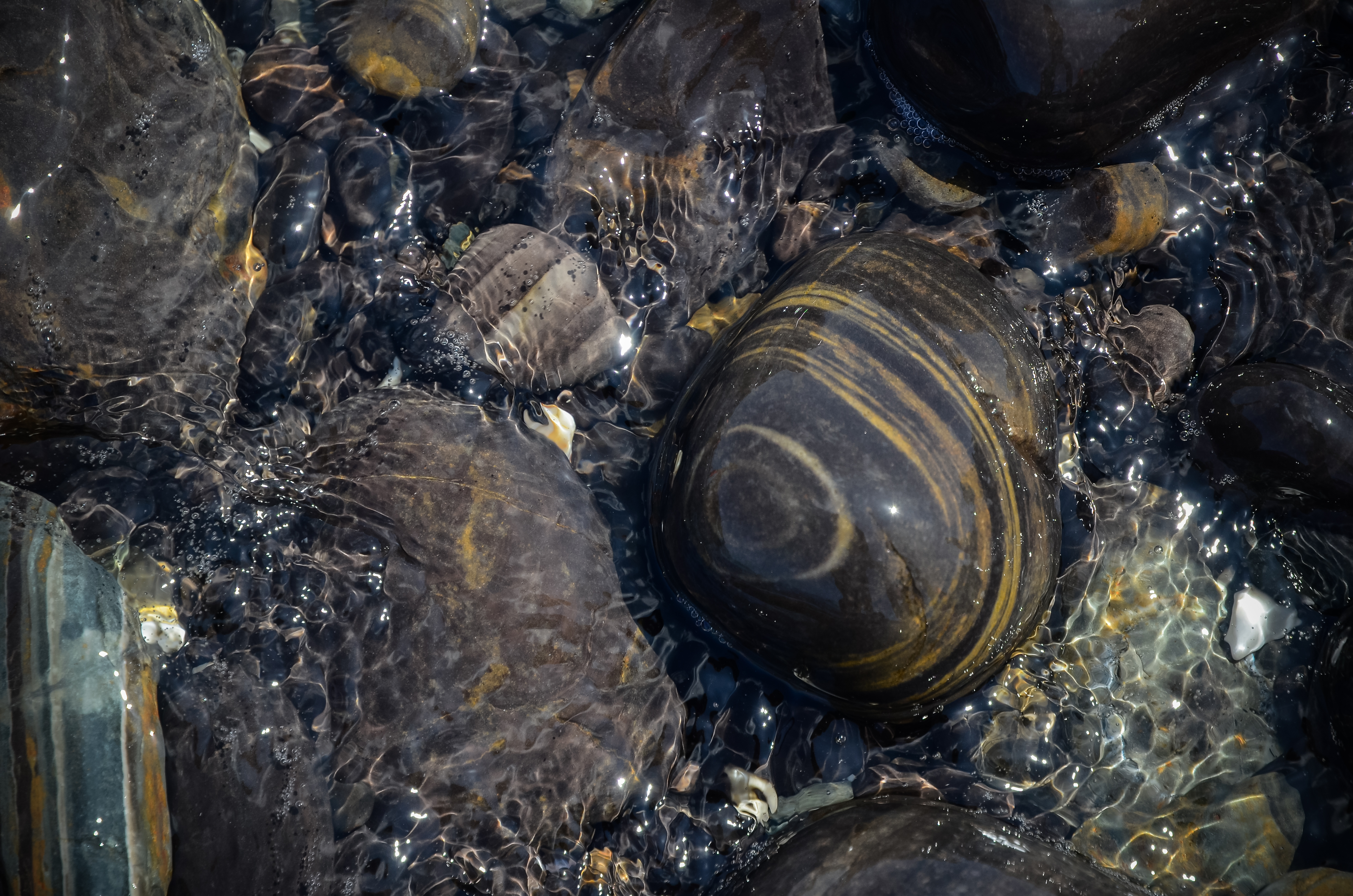
Tarutao National Park

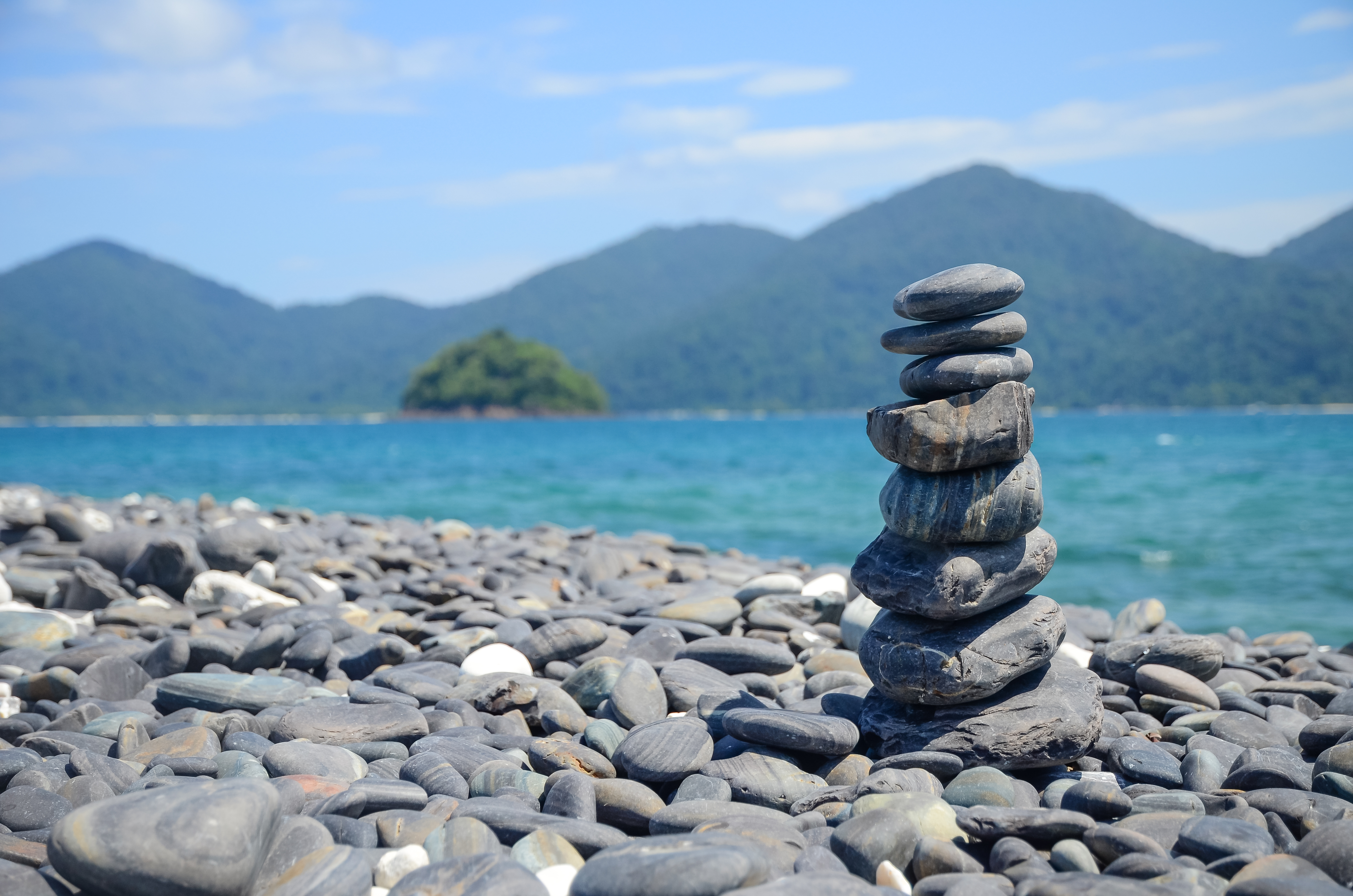
Tarutao National Park

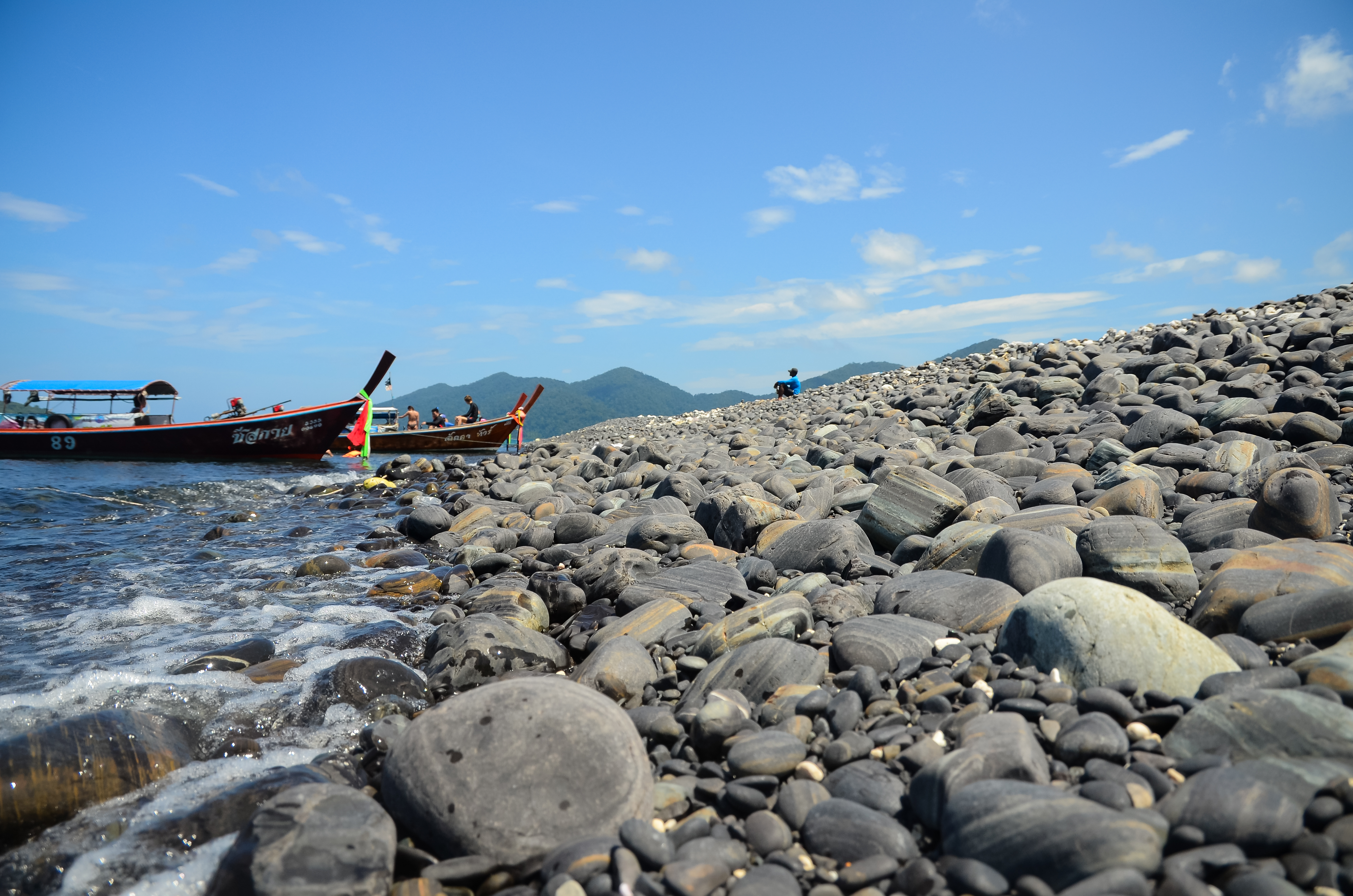
Tarutao National Park

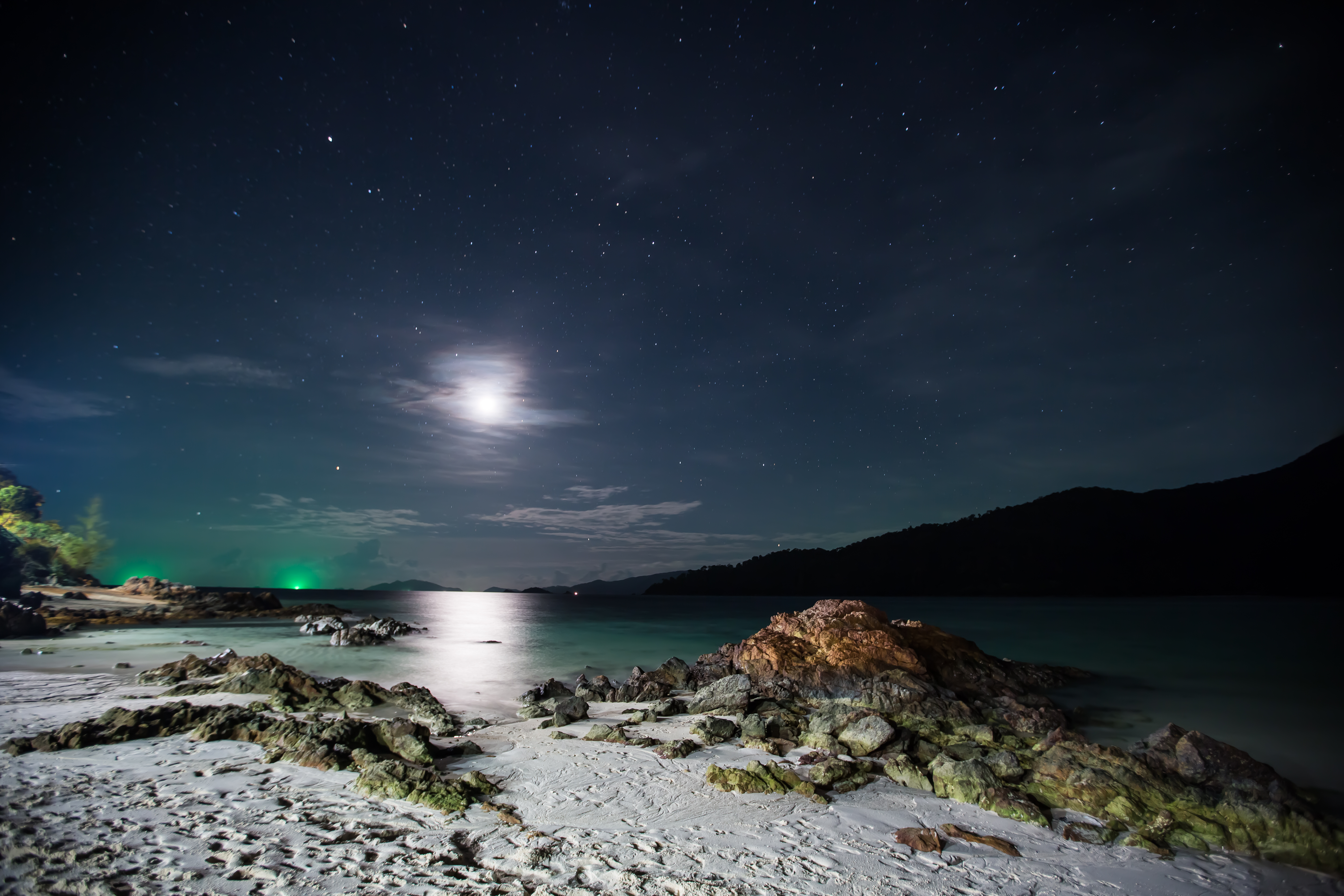
Beach at Night with Moon and Stars in Ko Lipe

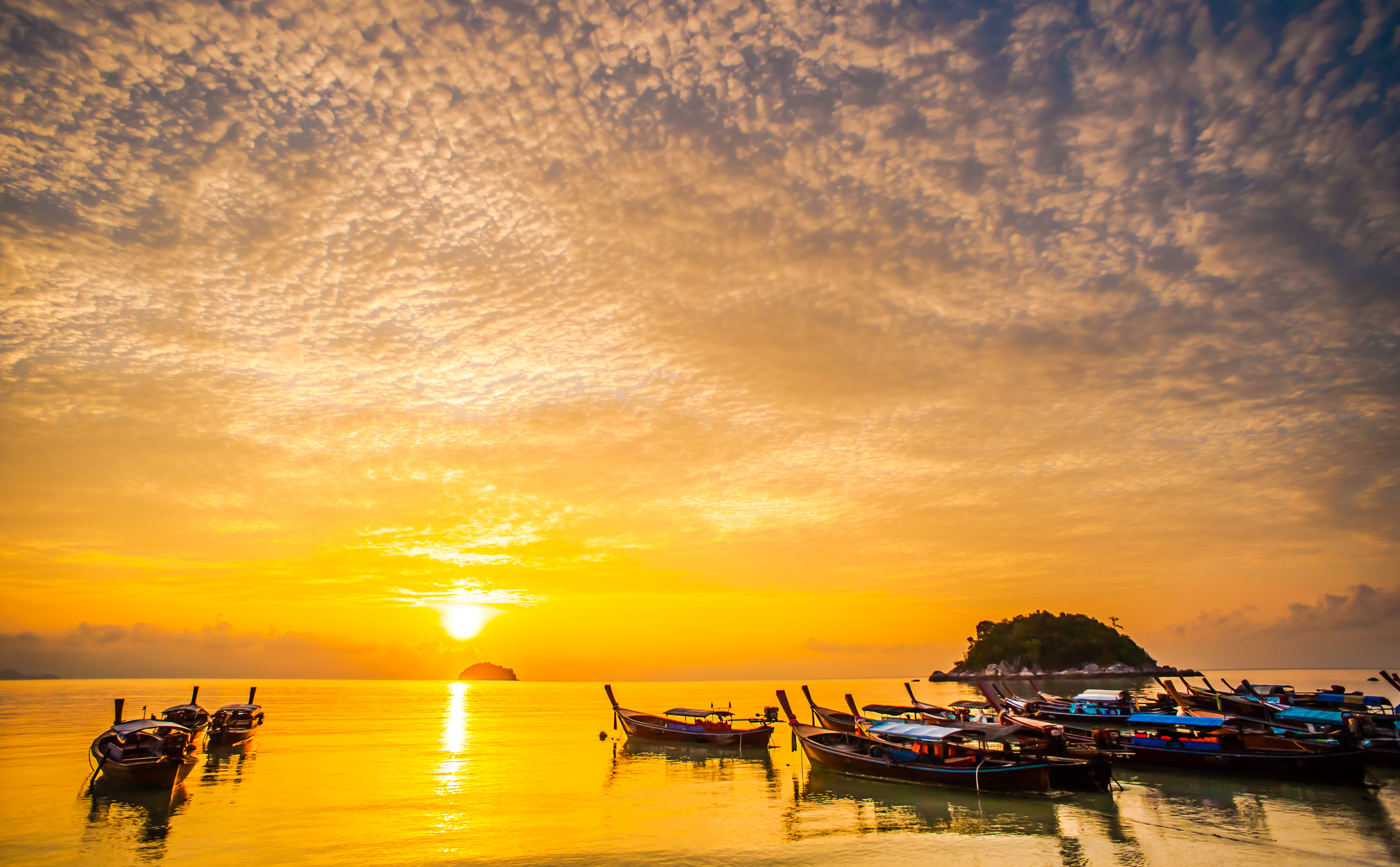
Ko Lipe
