= Ko Sarai =

Subdistrict in Mueang Satun district, Satun province, Thailand

Coordinates: 6°35′N 99°31′E

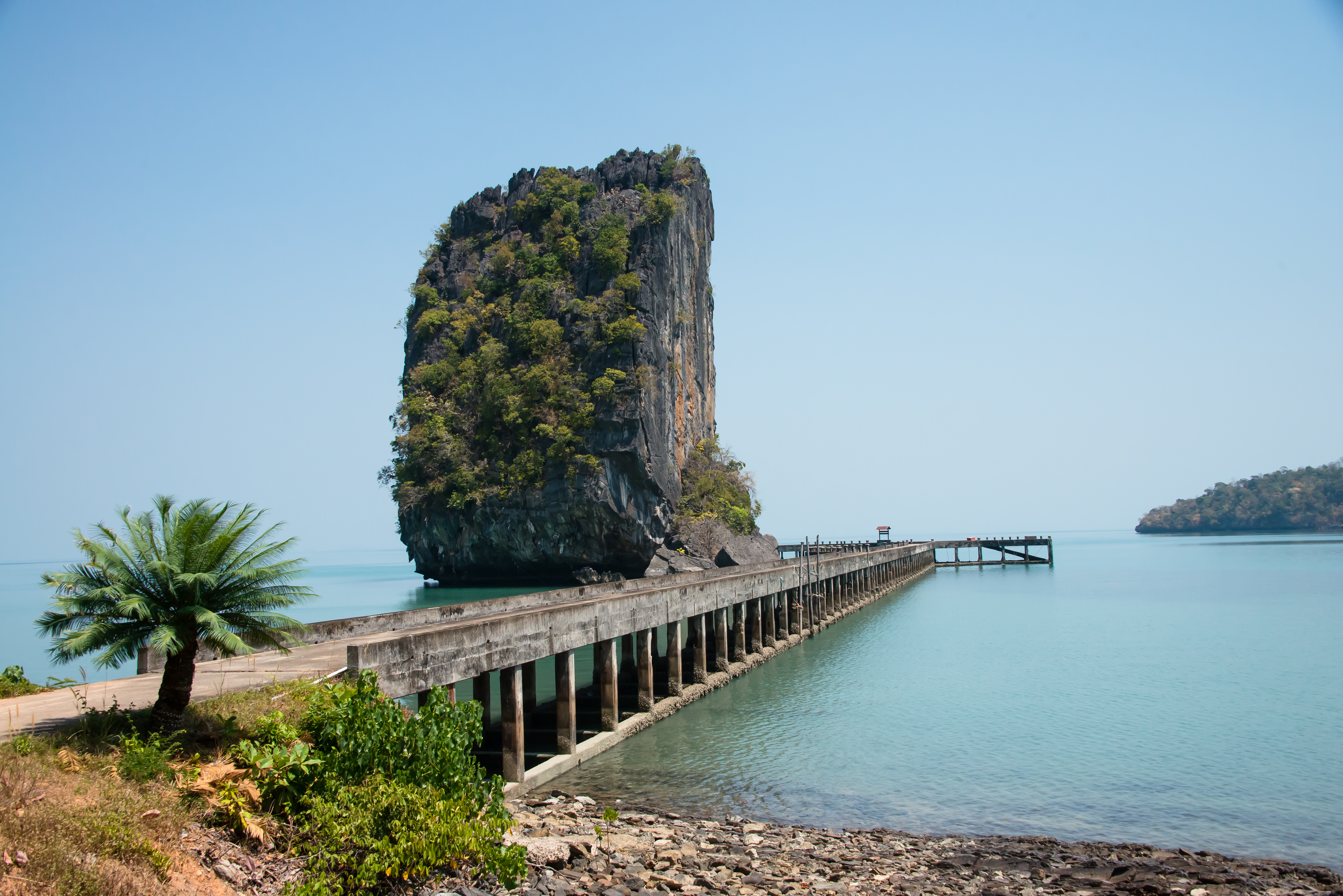
Ao Talo Wao, bight and pier in Ko Sarai, Ko Tarutao

Ko Sarai (Thai: เกาะสาหร่าย, pronounced [kɔ̀ʔ sǎːràːj]) is a subdistrict (tambon) in Mueang Satun District, Satun Province, Thailand. It is composed of 3 island groups, totaling 243 km^{2}, and has a population of 5,077 as of 2012.

- The biggest village is Ban Ko Sarai (sometimes called Ban Yaratot Yai), on the island with the same name.
- The population relies on fishing, agriculture and tourism.
- Amongst the attractions, Ko Tarutao, Ko Lipe, Ko Adang.

== Table of islands ==
Nr	Island	Capital	Other Cities	Area (km^{2})	Population (Note: The Islands area and population data retrieved from the 2012 census)
1	Mu Ko Adang – Rawi	Ao Sunrise	Ao Sunset, Ko Adang, Ko Rawi	67	1210
2	Mu Ko Sarai	Yaratot Yai	Yaratot Noi, Bakan Tohin, BaKan Yai,	13	3850
3	Mu Ko Tarutao	Ao Phante Malaka	Ao Chak, Ao Mo Lae, Ao Talo Udang, Ao Talo Wao,	163	20
	Ko Sarai Tambon	Yaratot Yai	Ko Lipe	243	5077

== See also ==
- Indian Ocean
- Outline of Thailand
- List of cities in Thailand
- List of islands of Thailand
