= Ko Adang =

Island in Thailand

Native name: เกาะอาดัง
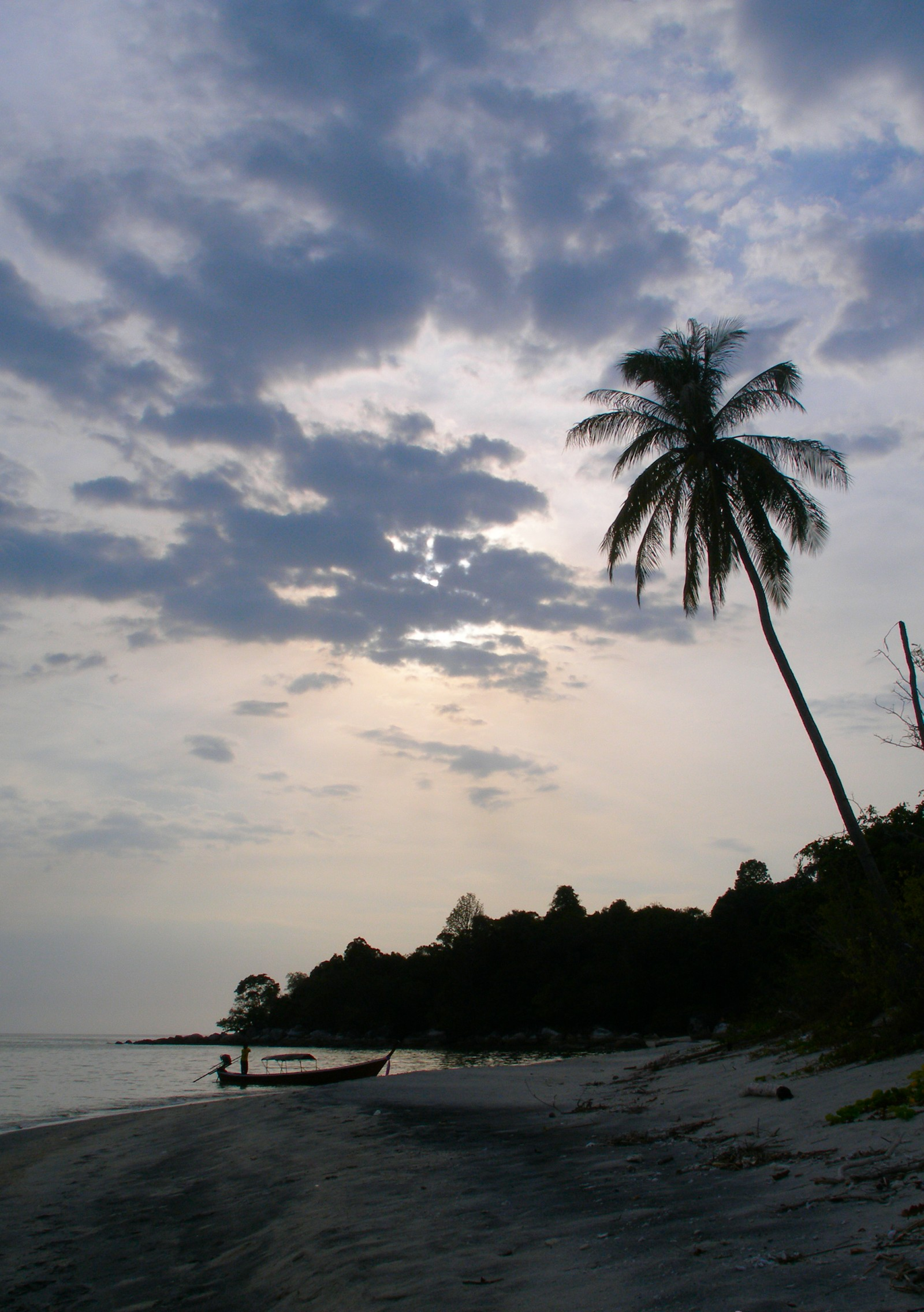
- Ko Adang Beach at sunset
- Interactive map of Ko Adang

Geography
- Location: Strait of Malacca
- Coordinates: 6°33′N 99°18′E
- Archipelago: Adang Archipelago
- Area: 29 km^{2} (11 sq mi)

Administration
- Thailand
- Province: Satun
- District: Mueang Satun
- Tambon: Ko Sarai

Additional information
- Time zone: ICT (UTC+7)
- Postal code: 91000

Ko Adang (Thai: เกาะอาดัง, pronounced [kɔ̀ʔ ʔāːdāŋ]) is the second biggest island within Tarutao National Marine Park, in Thailand, very close to the much more developed island of Ko Lipe. The island is 6 km long and 5 km wide. The highest point on the island is 690 m.

== Overview ==
Adang has only a few sandy beaches, but the offshore coral reef is abundant. The hilly interior is covered in dense jungle, and there are two waterfalls. Flora present on the island includes the Sumatran pine. The Namtok Chon Salat waterfall has water flowing all year round, even in the dry season. There is also a viewpoint called "Pha Chado" (Chado cliff) which was an observation point for pirates in the past to attack commercial ships. It overlooks the pine trees and the white sand beaches of Ko Adang and Ko Lipe.

The Urak Lawoi first settled on Ko Adang in 1910 at the invitation of the Thai King, as a way to strengthen his claim to the islands amid border negotiations with the British. They lived on the island semi-nomadically and practiced subsistence agriculture and fishing. In 1974, the Thai government, without consultation, declared Ko Adang and the rest of the archipelago part of the Mu Ko Tarutao Marine National Park. In the 1980s, the government forcibly relocated Urak Lawoi people to Ko Lipe, but some islanders resisted their removal. In 1998 the Thai government gave permission for two small Urak Lawoi villages to remain on Ko Adang's northeast coast: Ao Talo Puya and Ao Talo Cengan. No new buildings are permitted to be built.

== Tourism ==
There are some mountain trails suitable for hiking through the jungle forest. Being part of the Tarutao National Marine Park, the island is very quiet and undeveloped. On the southern tip (closest to Ko Lipe) there are national park-run camping facilities, and bungalows. There is also a ranger station. Long-tail boats can be hired to get to other sights on and around Ko Adang, including a black sand beach to the north of the island.
