= Tarutao National Park =

Marine national park of Thailand

- IUCN category II (national park)
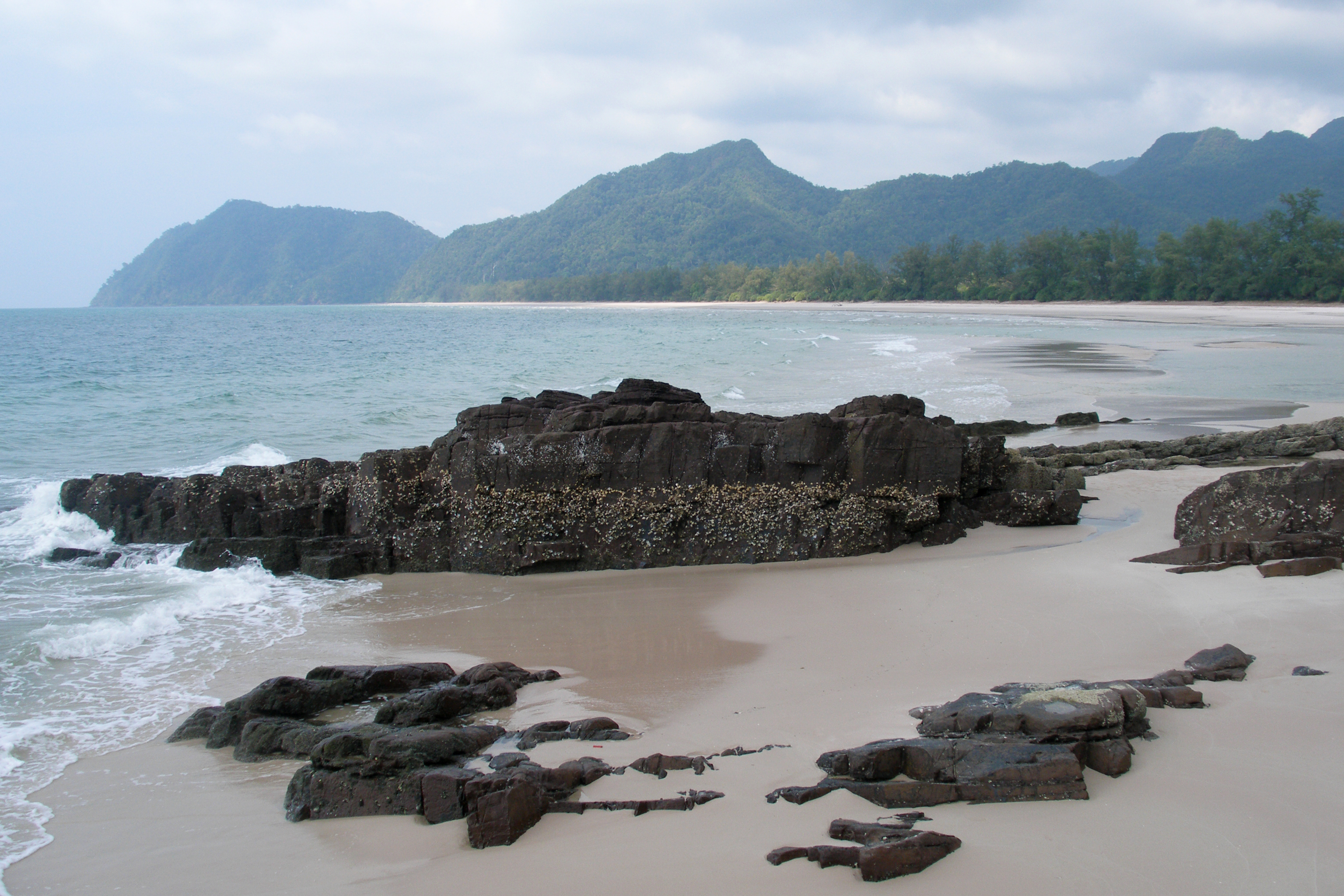
- Ko Tarutao
- Interactive map of Tarutao National Park
- Location: Satun Province, Thailand
- Nearest city: Satun
- Coordinates: 6°35′43″N 99°38′41″E
- Area: 1,490 km^{2} (580 sq mi)
- Established: 19 April 1974
- Visitors: 238,409 (in 2019)
- Governing body: Department of National Park, Wildlife and Plant Conservation (DNP)

Tarutao National Park (Thai: อุทยานแห่งชาติตะรุเตา) consists of 51 islands in the Strait of Malacca, off the coast of Satun Province of southern Thailand. The Tarutao National Park consists of two island groups: Tarutao (Thai: หมู่เกาะตะรุเตา, Thai pronunciation: [mùː kɔ̀ʔ tàʔ.rúʔ.taw] or [ta.ru.taw]) and Adang-Rawi (Thai: หมู่เกาะอาดัง-ราวี, Thai pronunciation: [mùː kɔ̀ʔ ʔaːdaŋ raːwiː]), which are scattered 20 to 70 km off the coast. The park covers an area of 931,250 rai or 1,490 square kilometres (580 sq mi) of which 1,260 square kilometres (490 sq mi) is ocean and 230 square kilometres (89 sq mi) is land. The southernmost end of the park lies on the border with Malaysia, just north of Langkawi. Tarutao became Thailand's second marine national park on 19 April 1974. The coastal Khao Sam Roi Yot National Park had been designated in 1966.

The name "tarutao" is a Thai corruption of its original Malay name, "pulau tertua", "old, mysterious, and primitive island".

Ko Tarutao was the setting for Survivor: Thailand, the 2002 season for the U.S. reality television series, Survivor.

== Main (larger) islands ==
There are essentially nine islands of note in the Tarutao/Adang-Rawi archipelagos:

- Tarutao Archipelago (approximately 30 km off the Thai coast)

- Ko Tarutao (Thai: เกาะตะรุเตา) – The largest of the islands, Ko Tarutao is 26.5 km long, and 11 km wide. The highest point is over 700 m. Forest covers over 70% of the island.

- Klang Archipelago (approximately 38 km off the Thai coast)

- Ko Klang (Thai: เกาะกลาง), Ko Khai (Thai: เกาะไข), Ko Ta-Nga (Thai: เกาะตางาห์)

- The Adang/Rawi group of islands (approximately 50 km west of Tarutao)

- Ko Adang (Thai: เกาะอาดัง), Ko Rawi (Thai: เกาะราวี), Ko Lipe (Thai: เกาะหลีเป๊ะ), Ko Butang (also written as Tong or Dong; Thai: เกาะดง), Ko Lek (Thai: เกาะเหล็ก)
- In the Adang Archipelago, the small (4 km^{2}) island of Lipe is the most important. With water available year-round, it is the home of the largest permanent settlement, of approximately 800, and the gateway for boat transportation in and out of the Adang group.

== History ==
The park was established in 1974. In 1982, it was listed as one of the original ASEAN Heritage Parks. It was also submitted to UNESCO for inclusion as a World Heritage Site in 1990, but its listing was deferred at the fifteenth session of the World Heritage Committee in 1991. UNESCO requested stronger management of the area. The rivers and swamps of Tarutao Island were the last known refuge for the saltwater crocodile, Crocodylus porosus, within Thailand. The species is now extinct in the area.

The oldest surviving eyewitness description of the island dates from December 1606 and January 1607 and is contained in the travelogue of the Dutch East India Company Admiral Cornelis Matelief de Jonge. In the late-1930s the island was used as a penal colony for Thai political prisoners. During World War II, when support from the mainland was cut off, the guards and prisoners banded together and raided ships sailing through the waters near the island. The raids were masterminded by an American plantation owner who blamed the war for the loss of his fortune. He was assisted by two British non-commissioned officers who were on the run for murder and who ironically landed on Tarutao to sit out the war. They sank 130 ships, always killing everyone on board. After the pirates of Tarutao were eradicated by British forces at the end of the war, fishermen and farmers took up residence on the island.

== Attractions ==
- Son Bay (Ao Son) is the only bay on the west side of Tarutao National Park and is known as a place where turtles come to lay their eggs. Its longest beach is about 3 km.
- Luu Doo Waterfall on Son Bay is the only waterfall in Tarutao National Park. Underwater it is full of rock formations.
- Pantaemaraka Gulf has many pine trees and a clean white beach. Pantaemaraka Gulf is becoming a popular tourist attraction.
- Crocodile Cave is 300 metres deep. Tourists going to Crocodile Cave must go by long-tail boat (15 minutes) from Pantaemaraka Gulf and past the mangrove forest to access the cave.

== Ecosystem ==
In November 2018, the Department of Natural Park, Wildlife and Plant Conservation banned the use of plastic and styrofoam containers in Tarutao Islands National Park, according to Assistant Park Director Kittipong Sanui.

== Gallery ==
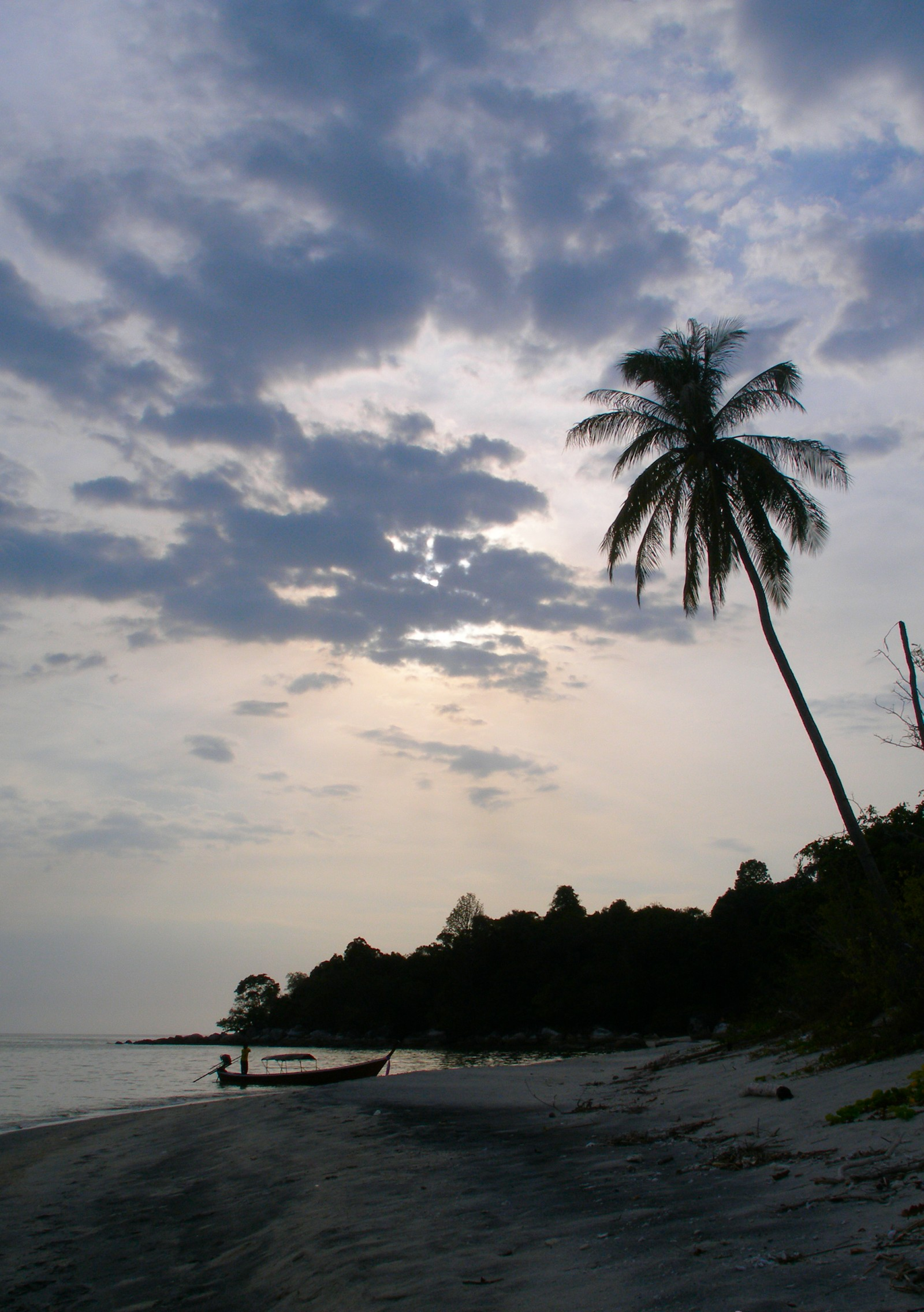
Sunset on Ko Adang

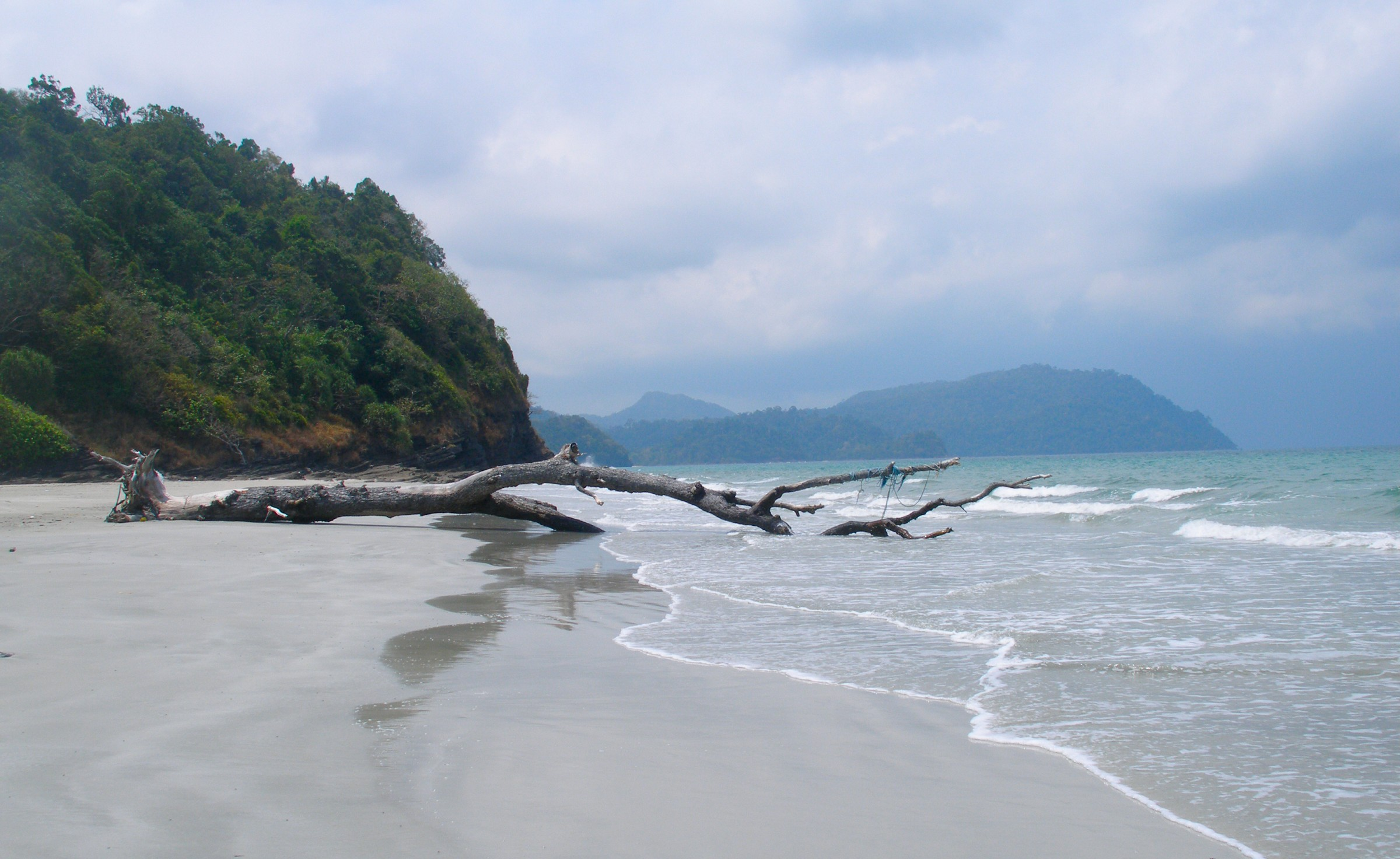
Beach on Ko Tarutao

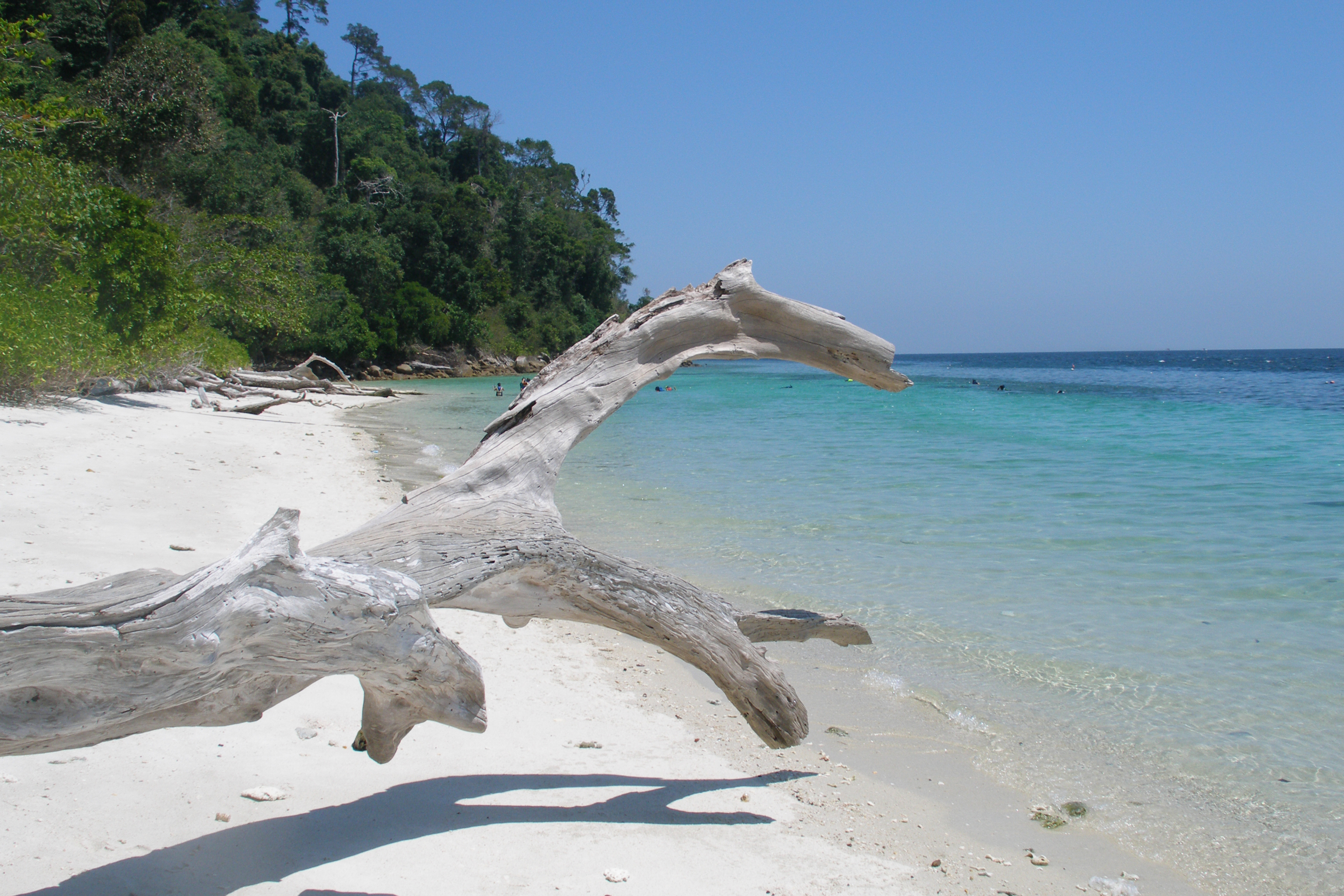
Beach on Ko Rawi

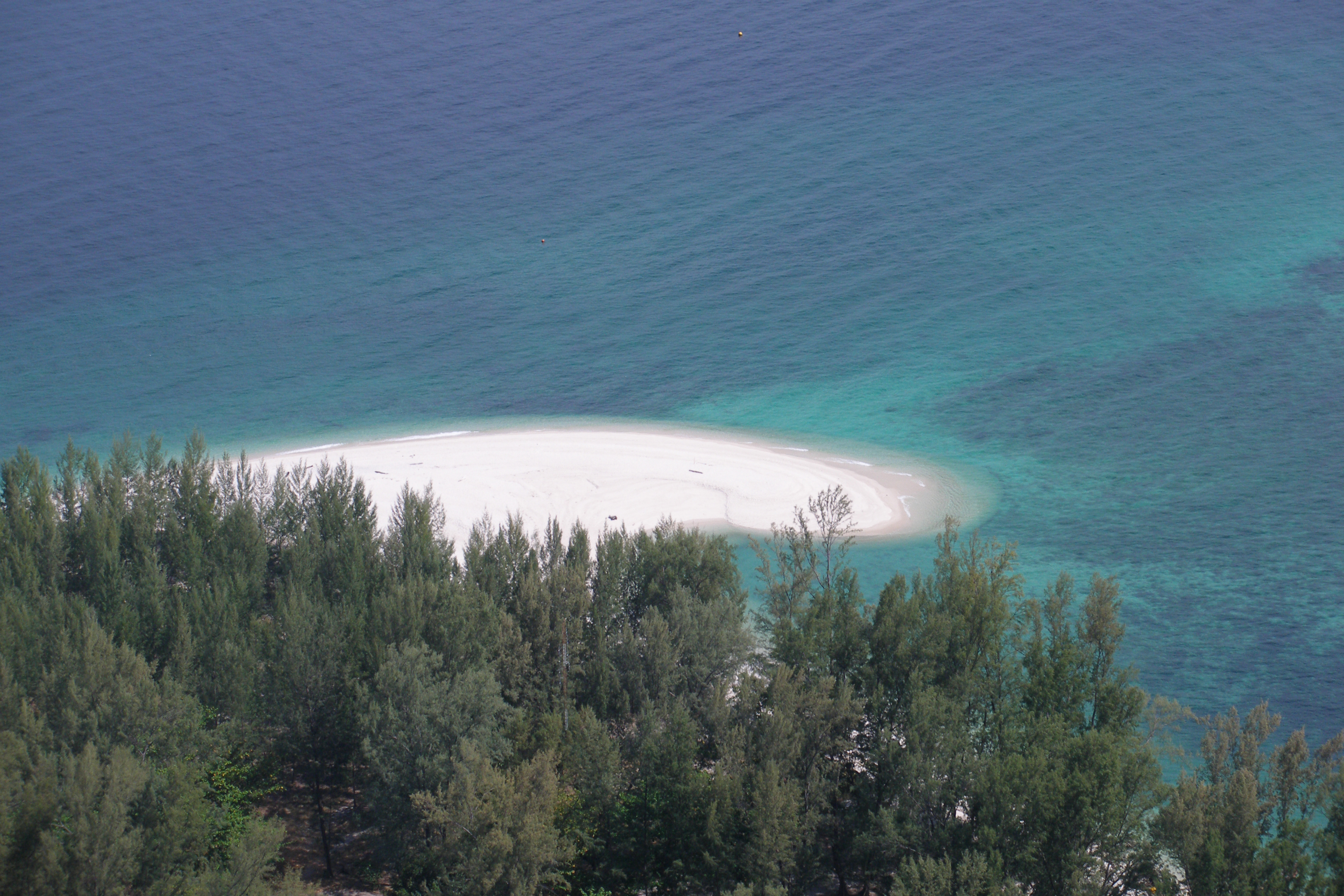
Koh Adang

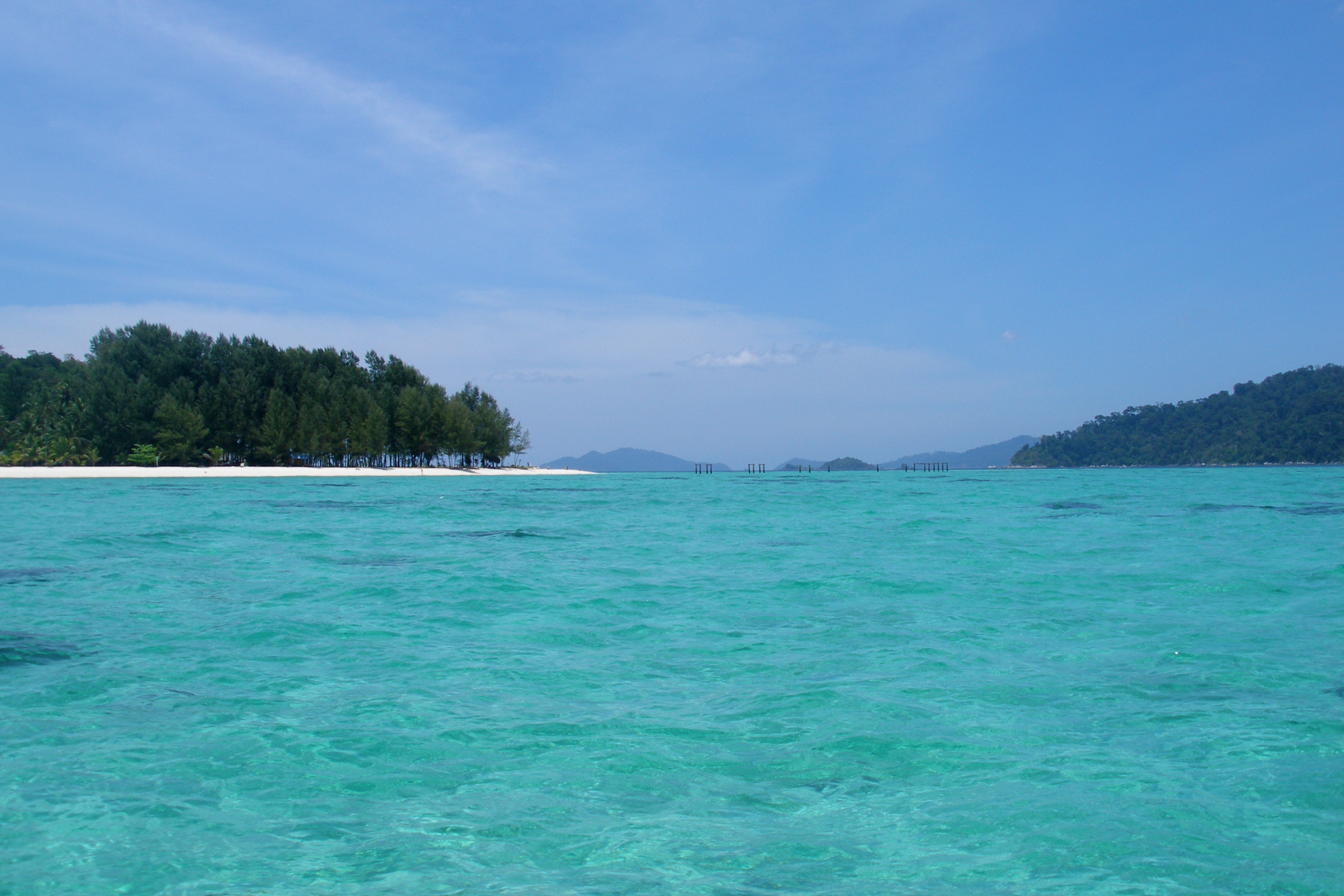
Turquoise waters between Koh Lipe and Koh Adang

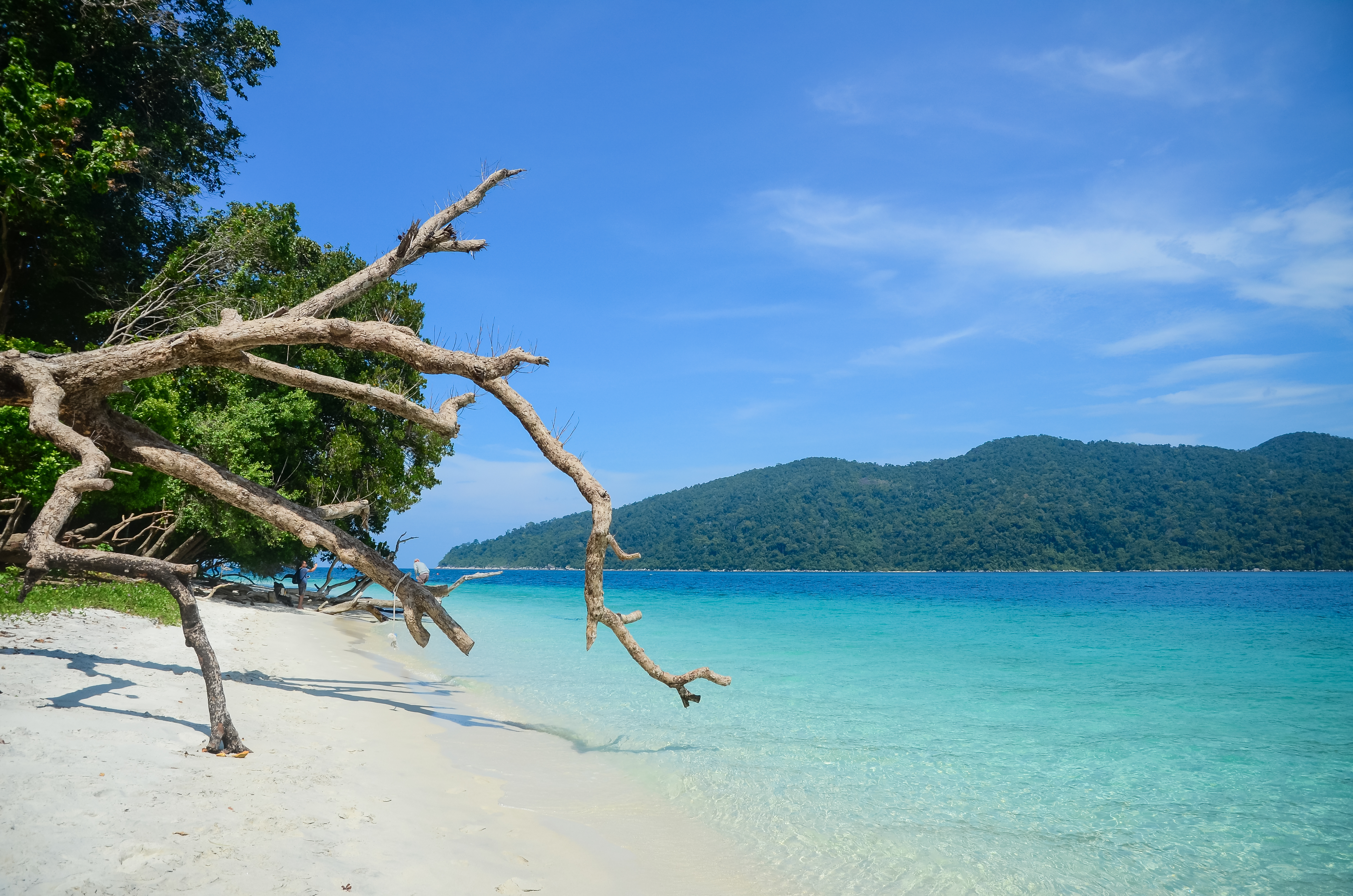

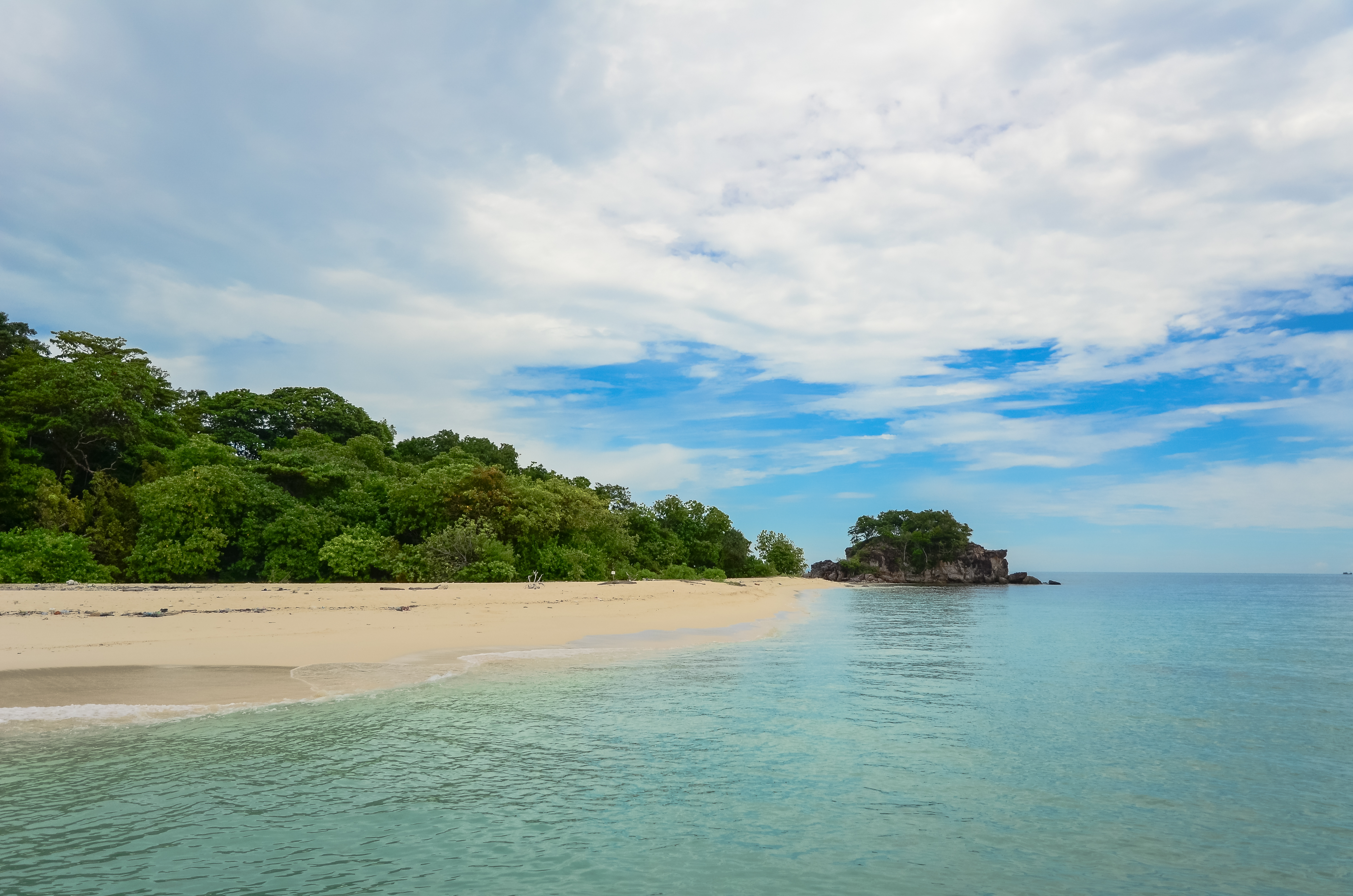

== Location ==
Tarutao National Park in overview PARO 5 (Nakhon Si Thammarat)

18) Tarutao National Park in overview PARO 5

	National park
1	Ao Phang Nga
2	Hat Chao Mai
3	Hat Khanom– Mu Ko Thale Tai
4	Hat Noppharat Thara– Mu Ko Phi Phi
5	Khao Lak–Lam Ru
6	Khao Lampi– Hat Thai Mueang
7	Khao Luang
8	Khao Nan
9	Khao Phanom Bencha
10	Mu Ko Lanta
11	Mu Ko Phetra
12	Mu Ko Similan
13	Mu Ko Surin
14	Namtok Si Khit
15	Namtok Yong
16	Si Phang Nga
17	Sirinat
18	Tarutao
19	Thale Ban
20	Than Bok Khorani

	Wildlife sanctuary
21	Kathun
22	Khao Pra–Bang Khram
23	Khlong Phraya
24	Namtok Song Phraek

	Non-hunting area
25	Bo Lo
26	Khao Nam Phrai
27	Khao Phra Thaeo
28	Khao Pra–Bang Khram
29	Khlong Lam Chan
30	Laem Talumpuk
31	Mu Ko Libong
32	Nong Plak Phraya– Khao Raya Bangsa
33	Thung Thale
	Forest park
34	Bo Namrong Kantang
35	Namtok Phan
36	Namtok Raman
37	Namtok Thara Sawan
38	Sa Nang Manora

== See also ==
- List of national parks of Thailand
- DNP - Tarutao National Park
- List of Protected Areas Regional Offices of Thailand
