= Ko Tarutao =

Island in the Andaman Sea

Native name: เกาะตะรุเตา
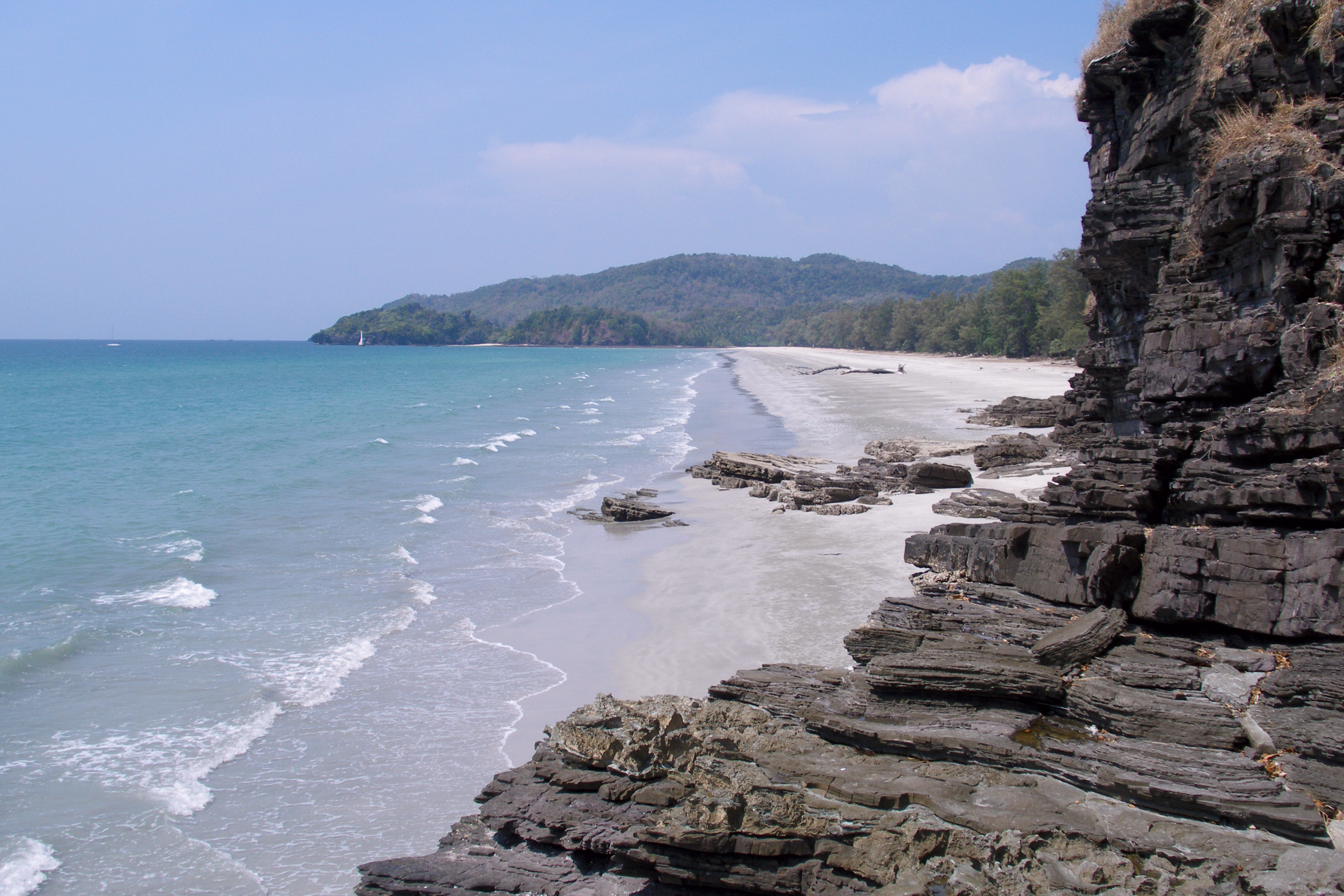
- Ko Tarutao coastline
- Interactive map of Ko Tarutao

Geography
- Location: Strait of Malacca
- Coordinates: 6°37′N 99°39′E
- Archipelago: Tarutao Archipelago
- Area: 152 km^{2} (59 sq mi)

Administration
- Thailand
- Province: Satun
- District: Mueang Satun
- Tambon: Ko Sarai

Ko Tarutao (Thai: เกาะตะรุเตา) is the largest island of the Tarutao National Park in Satun Province of southern Thailand. The island is 26 km (16 mi) long and 11 km (7 mi) wide. It is one of the most unspoiled islands in Andaman Sea and in all of Thailand. Ko Tarutao is located about 10 km (6 mi) north of Langkawi Island in Malaysia. The Malay word tertua or tarutao means old and primitive.

== Overview ==
There is a concrete road running through the island, but the terrain is rugged and mountainous with several peaks stretching more than 500 metres (1,600 ft) high. The highest peak is 713 metres (2,339 ft) high. Most of the island territory is covered in dense, old growth jungle. Mangrove trees and limestone cliffs cover much of the island shores. The western coast has long and wide white-sand beaches which are historical nestling ground sites for turtles. Langurs, crab-eating macaques and wild pigs are common on the island.

Ao Son beach on the west side of the island is over 4 km (2 mi) long and over 100 metres (330 ft) wide.

From its eastern side the larger island of Ko Tarutao is encircled by over 10 smaller offshore islands and limestone karst islets, such as Ko Sing, Ko Kaman, Ko Ko Lo, Ko Klang, Ko Pulao Na, Ko Daeng, Ko Laen, Ko Lek, and others.

== History ==
Ko Tarutao is a place of historical importance. Between 1938 and 1948, more than 3,000 Thai criminals and political prisoners were held on the island, including Prince Sithiporn Kridakara, a member of the Chakri dynasty who would later serve as Minister of Agriculture in post-war Thailand under the third premiership of Khuang Aphaiwong. During World War II, food and medical supplies from the mainland were depleted and many prisoners died from malaria. Those who survived, both prisoners and guards, became pirates in the nearby Strait of Malacca. They were later suppressed by British troops in 1951 to deter the rise of more prisoners.

In 2002, Ko Tarutao was used as the filming location for Survivor: Thailand.

A 16 August 2013 Bangkok Post editorial said human trafficking gangsters "use the southern tip of the island to incarcerate and torture Muslim Rohingya boat people to extort ransom money before selling them into slavery".

== Gallery ==
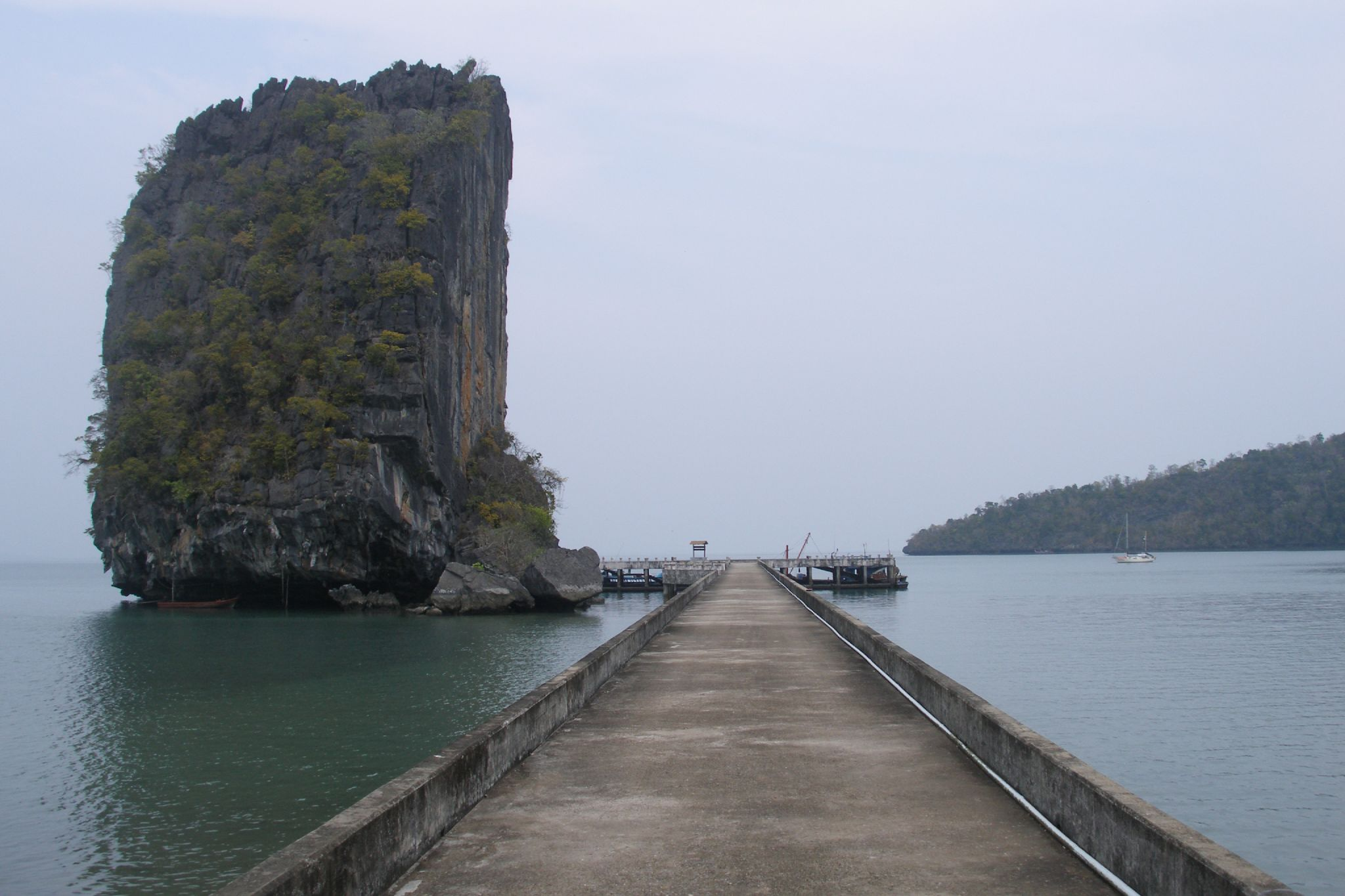
A dock and 30-metre-high (98 ft) limestone cliff near the old prison site on the east side of the island

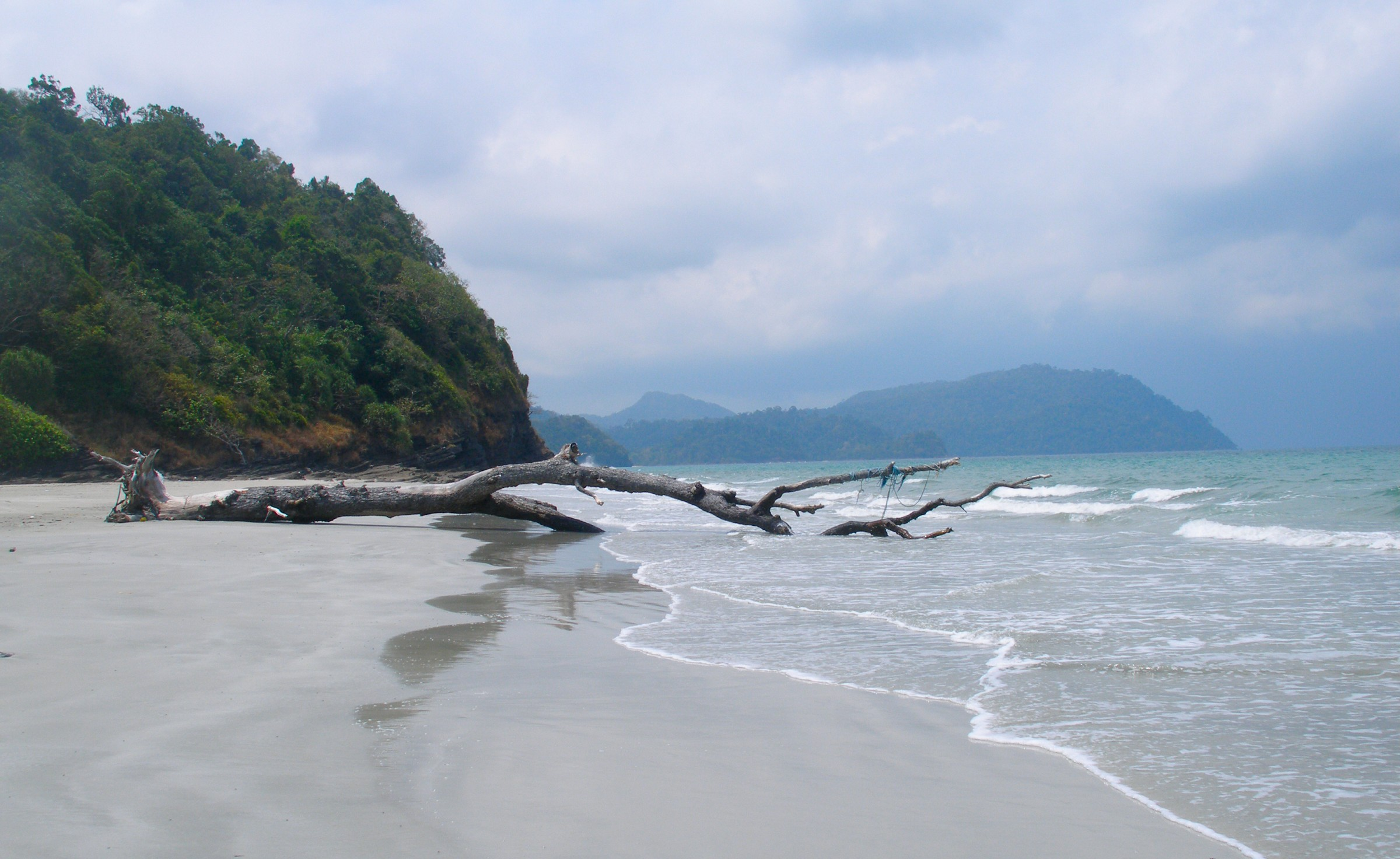
West coast of Koh Tarutao

== See also ==
- Tarutao National Park
