= Satun =

Satun สตูล
- Town
- เทศบาลเมืองสตูล
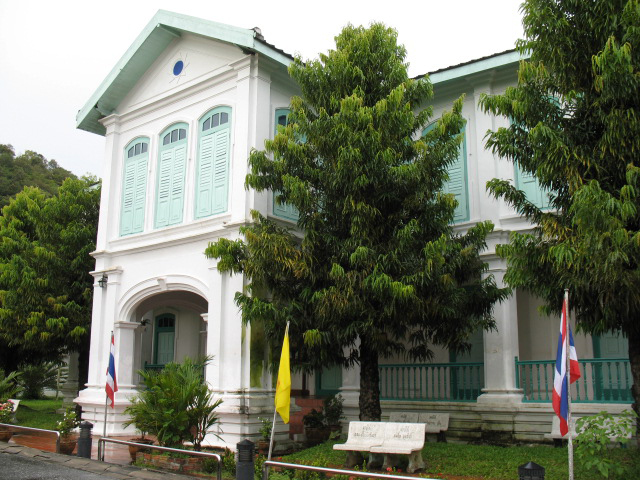
- Satun National Museum

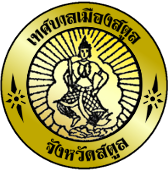
- Seal

- Location in Thailand
- Coordinates: 6°36′53″N 100°4′5″E
- Country: Thailand
- Province: Satun
- District: Mueang Satun

Government
  - Mayor: Prasit Baesakul

Population (2005)
  - Total: 21,498
- Time zone: UTC+7 (ICT)
- Area code: (+66) 74
- Website: stm.go.th

Satun (Thai: สตูล, pronounced [sā.tūːn], Malay: Setul) is a town (thesaban mueang) in southern Thailand, capital of the Satun province. It covers the whole tambon Phiman of Mueang Satun. Satun lies 985 km south of Bangkok. As of 2005 it has a population of 21,498.

== Climate ==
Satun has a tropical monsoon climate (Am) with a short dry season in January and February and a prolonged wet season running from March to December. The highest monthly rainfall occurs in September and October with average monthly rainfall above 320 mm. The average annual high temperature in Satun is 32.6 °C and the average annual low temperature is 23.7 °C.

Climate data for Satun (1991–2020, extremes 1978-present)
Month	Jan	Feb	Mar	Apr	May	Jun	Jul	Aug	Sep	Oct	Nov	Dec	Year
Record high °C (°F)	36.5 (97.7)	37.8 (100.0)	39.5 (103.1)	39.6 (103.3)	38.1 (100.6)	36.8 (98.2)	37.1 (98.8)	35.9 (96.6)	35.3 (95.5)	37.0 (98.6)	36.2 (97.2)	35.7 (96.3)	39.6 (103.3)
Mean daily maximum °C (°F)	32.8 (91.0)	34.3 (93.7)	34.9 (94.8)	34.2 (93.6)	33.3 (91.9)	32.6 (90.7)	32.2 (90.0)	32.0 (89.6)	31.7 (89.1)	31.7 (89.1)	31.9 (89.4)	31.7 (89.1)	32.8 (91.0)
Daily mean °C (°F)	27.7 (81.9)	28.2 (82.8)	28.6 (83.5)	28.5 (83.3)	28.3 (82.9)	27.9 (82.2)	27.6 (81.7)	27.5 (81.5)	27.1 (80.8)	27.0 (80.6)	27.2 (81.0)	27.2 (81.0)	27.7 (81.9)
Mean daily minimum °C (°F)	23.7 (74.7)	23.5 (74.3)	23.7 (74.7)	24.4 (75.9)	24.6 (76.3)	24.3 (75.7)	24.0 (75.2)	24.0 (75.2)	23.8 (74.8)	23.7 (74.7)	23.8 (74.8)	23.6 (74.5)	23.9 (75.1)
Record low °C (°F)	17.6 (63.7)	17.0 (62.6)	18.0 (64.4)	19.2 (66.6)	20.8 (69.4)	20.5 (68.9)	21.0 (69.8)	19.2 (66.6)	20.1 (68.2)	20.0 (68.0)	19.4 (66.9)	18.0 (64.4)	17.0 (62.6)
Average precipitation mm (inches)	43.6 (1.72)	40.6 (1.60)	133.9 (5.27)	210.3 (8.28)	228.7 (9.00)	189.7 (7.47)	230.4 (9.07)	277.8 (10.94)	334.2 (13.16)	343.8 (13.54)	217.8 (8.57)	118.4 (4.66)	2,369.2 (93.28)
Average precipitation days (≥ 1.0 mm)	4.1	3.5	8.3	13.8	14.9	13.0	14.1	15.7	17.3	20.4	15.4	10.4	150.9
Average relative humidity (%)	71.5	69.2	73.1	78.8	81.6	82.0	82.5	82.6	84.2	84.6	82.1	77.8	79.2
Mean monthly sunshine hours	198.4	183.6	186.0	183.0	151.9	147.0	151.9	151.9	108.0	111.6	141.0	182.9	1,897.2
Mean daily sunshine hours	6.4	6.5	6.0	6.1	4.9	4.9	4.9	4.9	3.6	3.6	4.7	5.9	5.2
Source 1: World Meteorological Organization, Meteomanz (record)
Source 2: Office of Water Management and Hydrology, Royal Irrigation Department (sun 1981–2010)(extremes)

== Transportation ==
Satun is connected to Malaysian Langkawi Island by direct ferry service.

== Telecommunication ==
Satun hosts Thailand's landing points for optical fiber submarine communications cable Segment FEA (FLAG Europe Asia) of the 28,000-kilometer-long FLAG (Fiber-Optic Link Around the Globe); and for the 49,000-kilometer-long SEA-ME-WE 3, which links regions of south-east Asia to regions of the Middle East and Western Europe.
