= Mueang Satun district =

Mueang Satun เมืองสตูล
- District
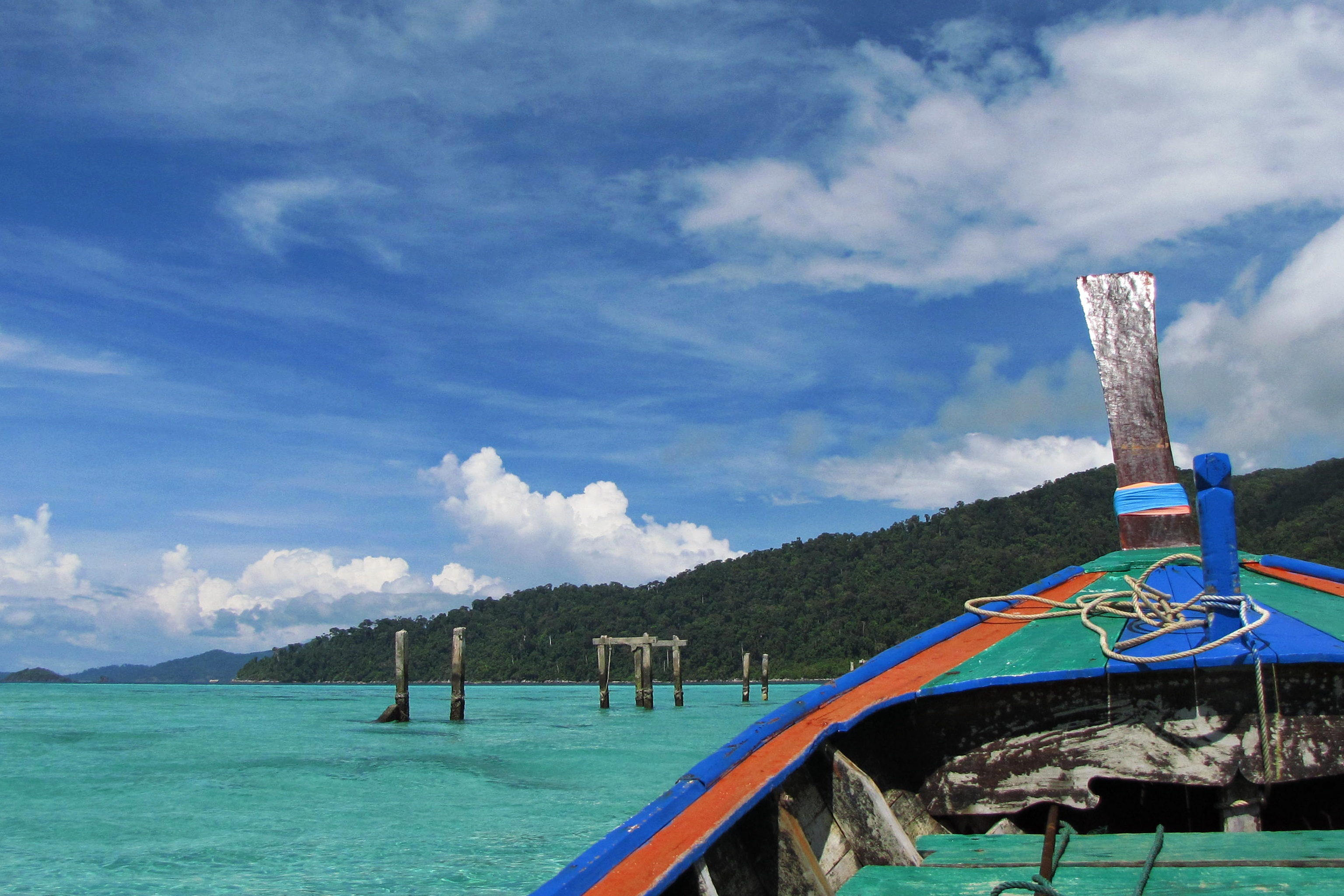
- View of Ko Lipe

- District location in Satun province
- Coordinates: 6°37′24″N 100°4′0″E
- Country: Thailand
- Province: Satun
- Seat: Khlong Khut

Area
  - Total: 880.2 km^{2} (339.8 sq mi)

Population (2005)
  - Total: 101,557
  - Density: 115.4/km^{2} (299/sq mi)
- Time zone: UTC+7 (ICT)
- Postal code: 91000
- Geocode: 9101

Mueang Satun (Thai: เมืองสตูล, pronounced [mɯ̄a̯ŋ sā.tūːn]) is the capital district (amphoe mueang) of Satun province, southern Thailand.

== History ==
As a punishment for the retaliation against Siamese Kingdom, King Rama III ordered Syburi (Kedah) to be divided into four separate mueangs: Kubang Pasu, Syburi, Perlis, and Satun in 1833. He set Mueang Satun under Nakhon Si Thammarat. The kingdom was known as Setul Mambang Segara.

In 1897, King Chulalongkorn (Rama V) reunified the four cities under the newly established Monthon (มณฑล) Syburi. When the United Kingdom and Siam (Thailand) signed the Anglo-Siamese Treaty of 1909, only Satun remained with Siam, which was then placed under Monthon Phuket (มณฑลภูเก็ต) in 1910, until 1933.

Originally Satun province was divided into two districts and one minor district. Mambang (มำบัง) was one of these two original districts, which was renamed "Mueang Satun" in 1938, when all capital districts were named according to the corresponding province name.

== Geography ==
Neighboring districts are (from the northwest clockwise) Tha Phae, Khuan Don of Satun Province, the state Perlis of Malaysia and the Andaman Sea. The Tarutao National Marine Park containing the Tarutao and Adang archipelagos belong to the district. Also some parts of the boundary area with Malaysia is protected in the Thale Ban National Park. Satun's location permits it to host Thailand's landing points for optical fiber submarine communications cable Segment FEA (FLAG Europe Asia) of the 28,000-kilometer-long FLAG (Fiber-Optic Link Around the Globe); and for the 49,000-kilometer-long SEA-ME-WE 3, which links regions of Southeast Asia to the Middle East and Western Europe.

== Administration ==
The district is divided into 12 sub-districts (tambons), which are further subdivided into 67 villages (muban). The town (thesaban mueang) Satun covers tambon Phiman. There are a further three townships (thesaban tambon): Chalung and Che Bi Lang, both covering parts of the same-named tambons, and Khlong Khut covers tambon Khlong Khut. There are also 10 tambon administrative organizations (TAO).

No.	Name	Thai name	Villages	Pop.
1.	Phiman	พิมาน	-	21,498
2.	Khlong Khut	คลองขุด	7	16,790
3.	Khuan Khan	ควนขัน	6	6,702
4.	Ban Khuan	บ้านควน	7	9,684
5.	Chalung	ฉลุง	14	11,989
6.	Koh Sarai	เกาะสาหร่าย	7	4,848
7.	Tanyong Po	ตันหยงโป	3	2,829
8.	Chebilang	เจ๊ะบิลัง	6	9,032
9.	Tam Malang	ตำมะลัง	3	4,850
10.	Puyu	ปูยู	3	2,869
11.	Khuan Pho	ควนโพธิ์	6	5,099
12.	Ketri	เกตรี	6	5,367
