= Highway 401 (Thailand) =

National highway in Southern Thailand

National Highway 401
- ทางหลวงแผ่นดินหมายเลข 401

Route information
- Length: 287.682 km (178.757 mi)

Major junctions
- West end: Amphoe Takua Pa
- Nakhon Si Thammarat
- Southeast end: Ban Tha Pae

Location
- Country: Thailand

Highway system
- Highways in Thailand; Motorways; Asian Highways

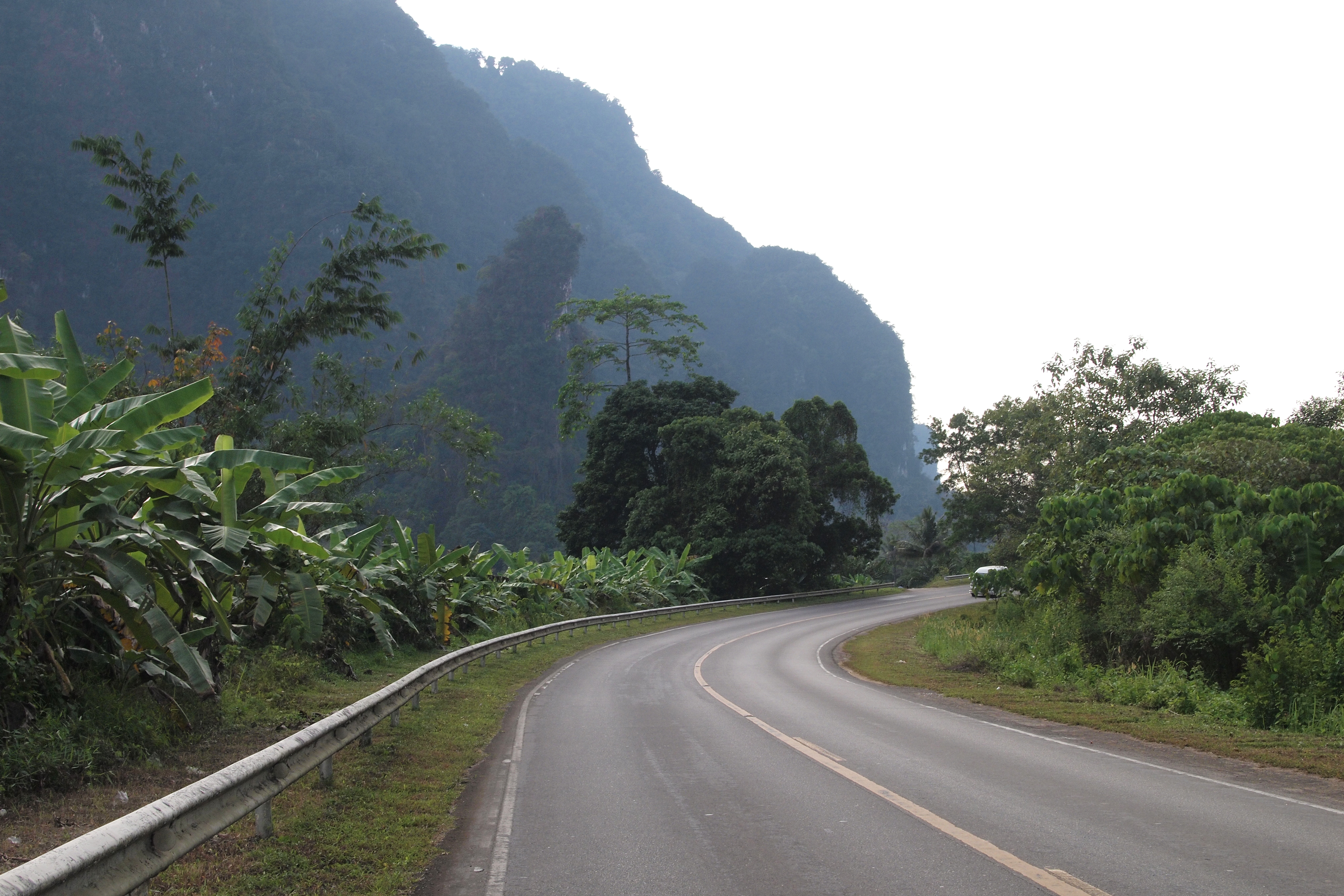
Route 401 near Khlong Phanom National Park, Surat Thani

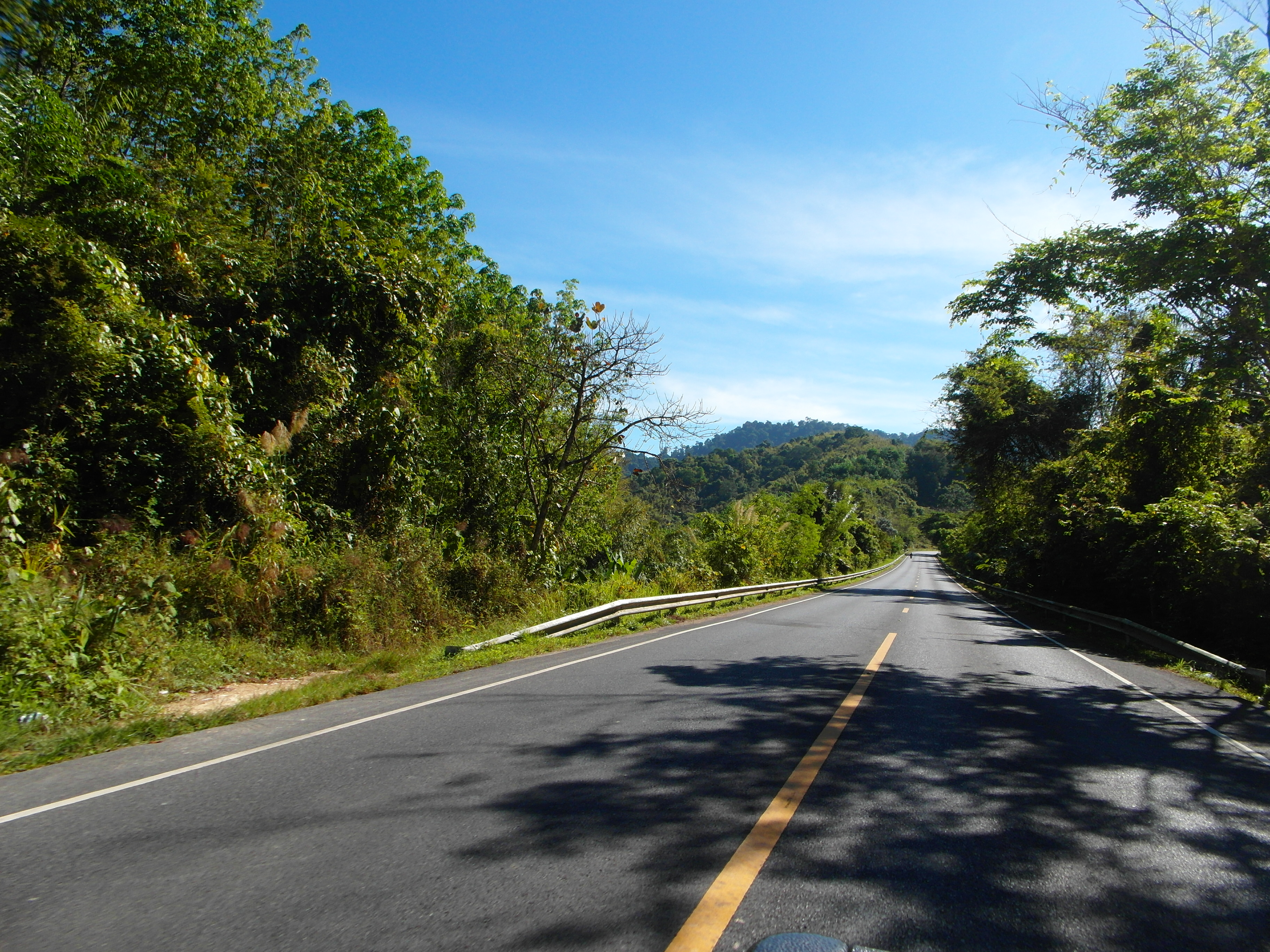
Route 401 at Khao Sok National Park, Phanom district, Surat Thani province

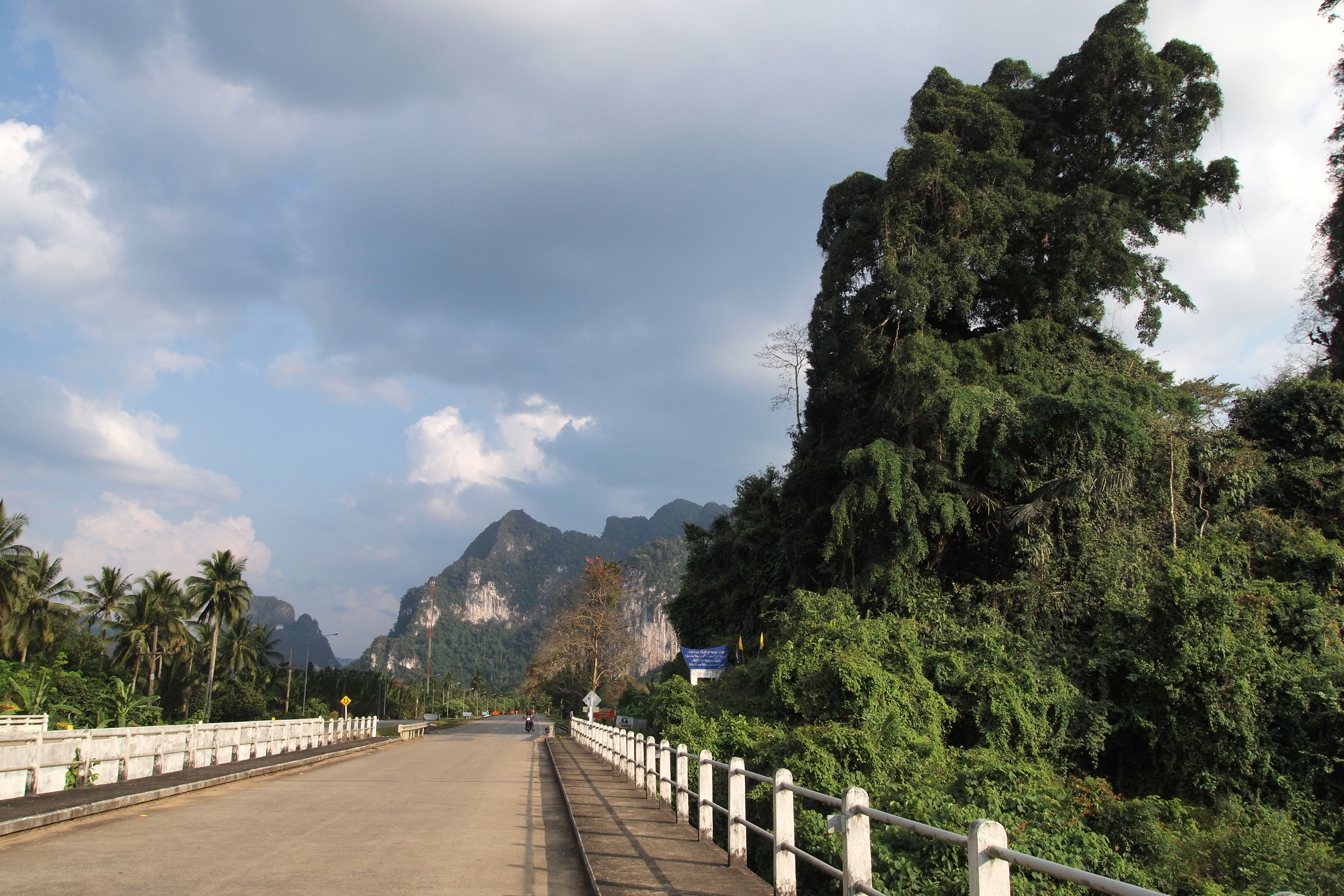
Route 401 near Ban Ta Khun, Surat Thani

Highway 401 is a national highway in Southern Thailand. It starts from the west coast of the Thai-Malay Peninsula at an intersection with Phetkasem Road (Highway 4) near Amphoe Takua Pa, Phang Nga Province.

The route runs eastward through Surat Thani Province to the east coast, then southward to Nakhon Si Thammarat Province. It ends at Ban Tha Pae, about 10 km north of Nakhon Si Thammarat town. Highway 4012 then connects Ban Tha Pae to Nakhon Si Thammarat town.

== Route Details ==
Route 401 is the main road that connects Surat Thani and Nakhon Si Thammarat. It starts near Amphoe Takua Pa as a two-lane single carriageway. Running eastward, it passes through Phanom, Ban Ta Khun districts to Phunphin district. Then it widens to a four-lane dual carriageway and continues to Surat Thani, Amphoe Kanchanadit. It enters Nakhon Si Thammarat province at Amphoe Khanom, but does not pass the town of Khanom. It, then, goes southward pass Amphoe Sichon, Amphoe Tha Sala and ends at Ban Tha Pae, about 10 km north of Nakhon Si Thammarat. Total length is 287.682 km. Of this, 23.628 km is in Phang Nga Province, 186.458 km in Surat Thani Province and 77.596 km in Nakhon Si Thammarat Province.

Most of the route is asphalt. However, a short section from Phun Phin till the start of the Surat Thani bypass is concrete. Almost all of the four-lane section is divided highway, with the exception of short sections at Ban Ton Reang and Ban Tha Pae.

From Amphoe Phunphin to Amphoe Khanom, the route crosses many hills. The highest is Khao Hua Chang, a few kilometers before the intersection with Route 4014. About 1 km east of Khao Hua Chang, the route expand to six lanes, with the outermost lane for slow vehicles such as trucks. Between Amphoe Sichon and Ban Tha Pae, it's mostly level. At Amphoe Tha Sala, the route runs very near the coast (10–50 m) for about 2 km. This is the only section of Route 401 that runs adjacent to the sea.

The section of Route 401 between the intersection with Route 4008 near Amphoe Phun Phin and the intersection with Route 4103 near Ban Tha Pae was once heavily used as a main access route to Bangkok for the lower southern provinces. However, when a new section of Route 41 between Phunphin and Thungsong was finished, the majority of traffic has moved to the new route.

There are two bypasses on Route 401, around Surat Thani (10.282 km) and Tha Sala (4.27 km).

Most of the road from Phunphin to Takua Pa is now viewable on Google Street View, the first long-distance countryside road in southern Thailand to be recorded.

== List of intersections ==
=== Phang Nga Province ===
- (Start) Route 4 (north to Ranong Province, south to Phang Nga Province, Phuket Province)
- Route 4090 (south to Amphoe Kapong)

=== Surat Thani Province ===
- Route 4118 (south to Amphoe Thap Put)
- Route 415 (south to Phang Nga Province)
- Route 41 (north to Chumphon Province, south to Trang Province, Krabi Province)
- Route 4008 (west to Amphoe Phunphin)
- Route 417 (north to Surat Thani Airport)
- Route 4009 (south to Amphoe Ban Na Doem, Amphoe Ban Na San)
- Route 44 (south to Trang Province, Krabi Province)
- Route 4142 (north to Amphoe Don Sak, ferry pier to Ko Samui)

=== Nakhon Si Thammarat Province ===
- Route 4014 (north to Amphoe Khanom)
- Route 4140 (west to Amphoe Nopphitam, east to Amphoe Tha Sala)
- Route 4103 (south to Phatthalung Province)
- (End) Route 4012 (south to Nakhon Si Thammarat)

== Route 4012 ==
Highway 4012
- Location: Ban Tha Pae–Nakhon Si Thammarat
- Length: 8 km (5.0 mi)

Route 4012 starts at Ban Tha Pae, at exactly the point where Route 401, and runs south to Nakhon Si Thammarat town. In the 2016 highway realignment included 4012 as part of Route 401. It is four-lane asphalt, two in each direction separated by a median.

Originally, the route passed through Fort Vachirawut. This was inconvenient because at night only vehicles with permission cards could use the route. Vehicles without permission used routes 4016 and 4013 to avoid Fort Vachirawut.

A new 4012 roadway was constructed about 1 km east of Fort Vachirawut. The newer route allows 24-hour access by all vehicles. The new route is usually known to locals as Thanon Om Kai (Fort-devious Road).

=== List of intersections ===
- Route 401 (start) (north to Amphoe Thasala, Surat Thani)
- Pattanakarn Kukwang Road (end) (south to Nakhon Si Thammarat town)
