= Highway 41 (Thailand) =

Road in Thailand

National Highway 41
- ทางหลวงแผ่นดินหมายเลข 41
- ถนนเอเชียน; Asian Road

Route information
- Part of AH2
- Length: 382.616 km (237.747 mi)

Major junctions
- North end: Hwy 4 / AH2 / Hwy 327 in Mueang Chumphon, Chumphon Province
- Hwy 417 in Phunphin district Hwy 401 in Phunphin district Hwy 44 in Ban Na Doem district Hwy 403 in Thung Song district Hwy 403 in Ron Phibun district
- South end: Hwy 4 / AH2 / Hwy 4285 in Mueang Phatthalung, Phatthalung Province

Location
- Country: Thailand
- Provinces: Chumphon, Surat Thani, Nakhon Si Thammarat, Phatthalung
- Major cities: Chumphon, Surat Thani, Nakhon Si Thammarat, Phatthalung

Highway system
- Highways in Thailand; Motorways; Asian Highways

Highway 41 (41 AH2) starts at intersection with Route 4 in Chumphon Province. It goes southward passing through Surat Thani Province and Nakhon Si Thammarat Province. It ends at Phatthalung Province joining Route 4 again.

== Route Details ==
Route 41 is the main highway for lower southern provinces. It starts at Pathom Phon interchange. At this interchange, Route 4 changes direction to the west coast of southern part. Route 41 goes directly southward which is shorter for most southern provinces.

In Chumphon Province, it starts at Amphoe Mueang Chumphon and passes through Amphoe Sawi, Amphoe Thung Tako, Amphoe Lang Suan and Amphoe Lamae. It enters Surat Thani Province at Amphoe Tha Chana and passes through Amphoe Chaiya, Amphoe Tha Chang, Amphoe Phunphin, Amphoe Ban Na Doem, Amphoe Ban Na San and Amphoe Wiang Sa. It then enters Nakhon Si Thammarat Province at Amphoe Chawang, and continues through Amphoe Na Bon, Amphoe Thung Song, Amphoe Ron Phibun, Amphoe Chulabhorn and Amphoe Cha-uat. It enters Phatthalung Province at Amphoe Pa Phayom, and passes through Amphoe Khuan Khanun. It ends at Amphoe Mueang Phatthalung.

Total length is about 390 km. About 110 km is in Chumphon Province, 140 km in Surat Thani Province, 105 km in Nakhon Si Thammarat Province and 35 km in Phatthalung Province. Route 41 is 4 lane, 2 lane for each direction dual carriageway with ditch to separate direction.

Route 41 is also a part of Asian Highway AH2 network.

== List of Intersection ==
Legend:

- I/C - Interchange, I/S - Intersection, RSA - Rest and service area, OBR - Overhead bridge restaurant, R/R - Restaurant and rest plaza, L/B - Layby, V/P - Vista point, TN - tunnel, T/P - Toll plaza, BR - Bridge
- C - Cloverleaf, S - Stack, T-A - Trumpet-A, T-B - Trumpet-B, DT - Directional-T/Y, SDT - Semi-Directional-T/Y, P-Y - Partial-Y, D - Diamond, P-C - Partial cloverleaf, D-D - Diverging diamond, D-R - Direct ramp

Province	District	Km	Exit	Name	Destinations	Notes
Chumphon	Mueang Chumphon district	0+000	I/C	Chumphon	Hwy 4 / AH2 – Ranong, Phang Nga, Phuket, Prachuap Khiri Khan, Ratchathani, Phetchaburi, Bangkok; Hwy 327 – Entrance to Chumphon	Junctions
Chumphon	Sawi	34+676	I/S	Sawi	Hwy 4003 –	T-junctions
Chumphon	Sawi	40+867	I/C	Khao Suan Turian	Hwy 4198 – Local Highway –	Roundabout
Chumphon	Thung Tako	44+911	I/S	Khao Phib	Hwy 4096 – Hwy 4091 -	Junctions
Surat Thani	Chaiya	131+300	I/C	Chaiya	Hwy 4011 – ST.3011 –	Roundabout
Surat Thani	Phunphin	161+980	I/C	Hua Toei	Hwy 417 –	T-junctions
Surat Thani	Phunphin	164+500	I/C	Nong Khari	Hwy 4153 –	T-junctions
Surat Thani	Phunphin	171+500	I/C	Tharong Chang	Hwy 401 –	Junctions
Surat Thani	Ban Na Doem	189+625	I/C	Tha Ruea	Hwy 44 –	Junctions
Nakhon Si Thammarat	Thung Song	297+700	I/C	Thung Song	Hwy 403 –	Junctions
Nakhon Si Thammarat	Thung Song	315+050	I/S	Suan Phak	Hwy 403 –	T-junctions
Phatthalung	Mueang Phatthalung	376+250	I/C	Phatthalung	Hwy 4 / AH2 – Trang, Krabi, Phang Nga, Phuket, Songkhla, Sadao, Pattani; Hwy 4285 Entrance to Phatthalung	Roundabout
Through to Hwy 4 / AH2 and Hwy 4285
