= Tha Sathon =

Coordinates: 8.9851937229°N 99.2413680339°E

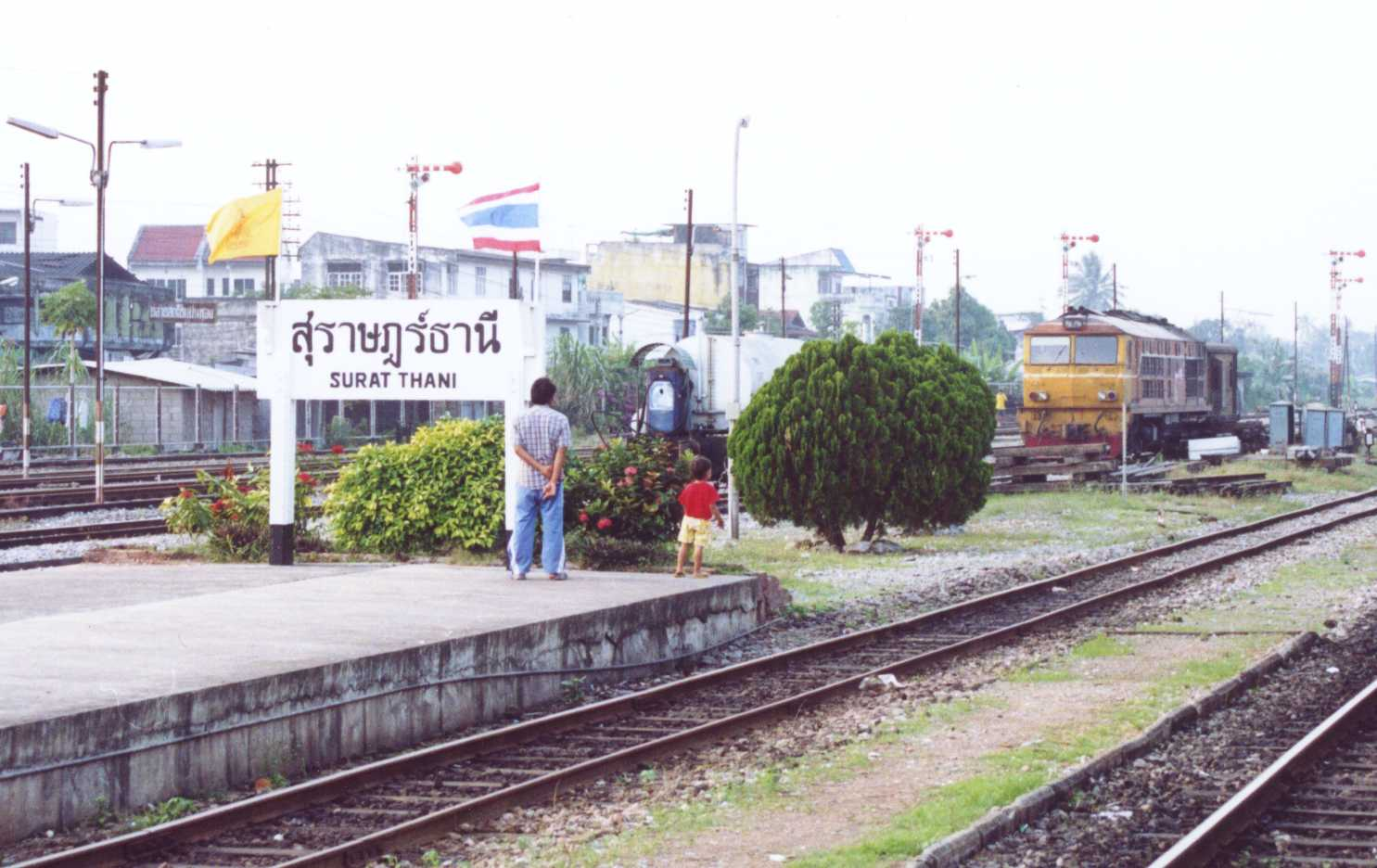
Surat Thani railway station

Tha Sathon (Thai: ท่าสะท้อน) is a tambon (sub-district) of Phunphin District, Surat Thani province, southern Thailand.

== Description ==
Tha Sathon is a hub for transportation of Surat Thani. It is the location of Surat Thani railway station, a provincial main station. Most tourists who travel by train from Hua Lamphong railway station in Bangkok tend to get off at this station to continue traveling to Ko Samui. Tha Sathon also has a few other railway stations. Tapi river, the main watercourse of the province, flows through the right side of the area and forms a line between Tha Sathon and Surat Thani city.

National famous politician Suthep Thaugsuban, began his politician career as a kamnan (sub-district chief) here in 1976 after graduating with a master's degree from the Middle Tennessee State University, USA.

== Geography ==
Neighboring sub-districts are (from north, clockwise): Khao Hua Khwai in its district, Khun Thale and Wat Pradu in Amphoe Mueang Surat Thani, Tha Ruea in Amphoe Ban Na Doem, Tha Kham in its district.

== Administration ==
Tha Sathon is administered by the Subdistrict Administrative Organization (SAO) Tha Sathon (องค์การบริหารส่วนตำบลท่าสะท้อน).

Tha Sathon also consists of six administrative villages (muban)

No.	Name	Thai
1.	Ban Na Kho	บ้านนาค้อ
2.	Ban Bo Krang	บ้านบ่อกรัง
3.	Ban Tha Sathon	บ้านท่าสะท้อน
4.	Ban Ta Hong	บ้านตาหงษ์
5.	Ban Pak Dan	บ้านปากด่าน
6.	Ban Huai Luek	บ้านห้วยลึก

== Population ==
Total population of 5,130 people in 1,200 households.

== Local product ==
- Krajood (Lepironia articulata) basketry

== Notable people ==
- Suthep Thaugsuban (1949 – present) politician
