= Kanchanadit district =

Kanchanadit กาญจนดิษฐ์
- District
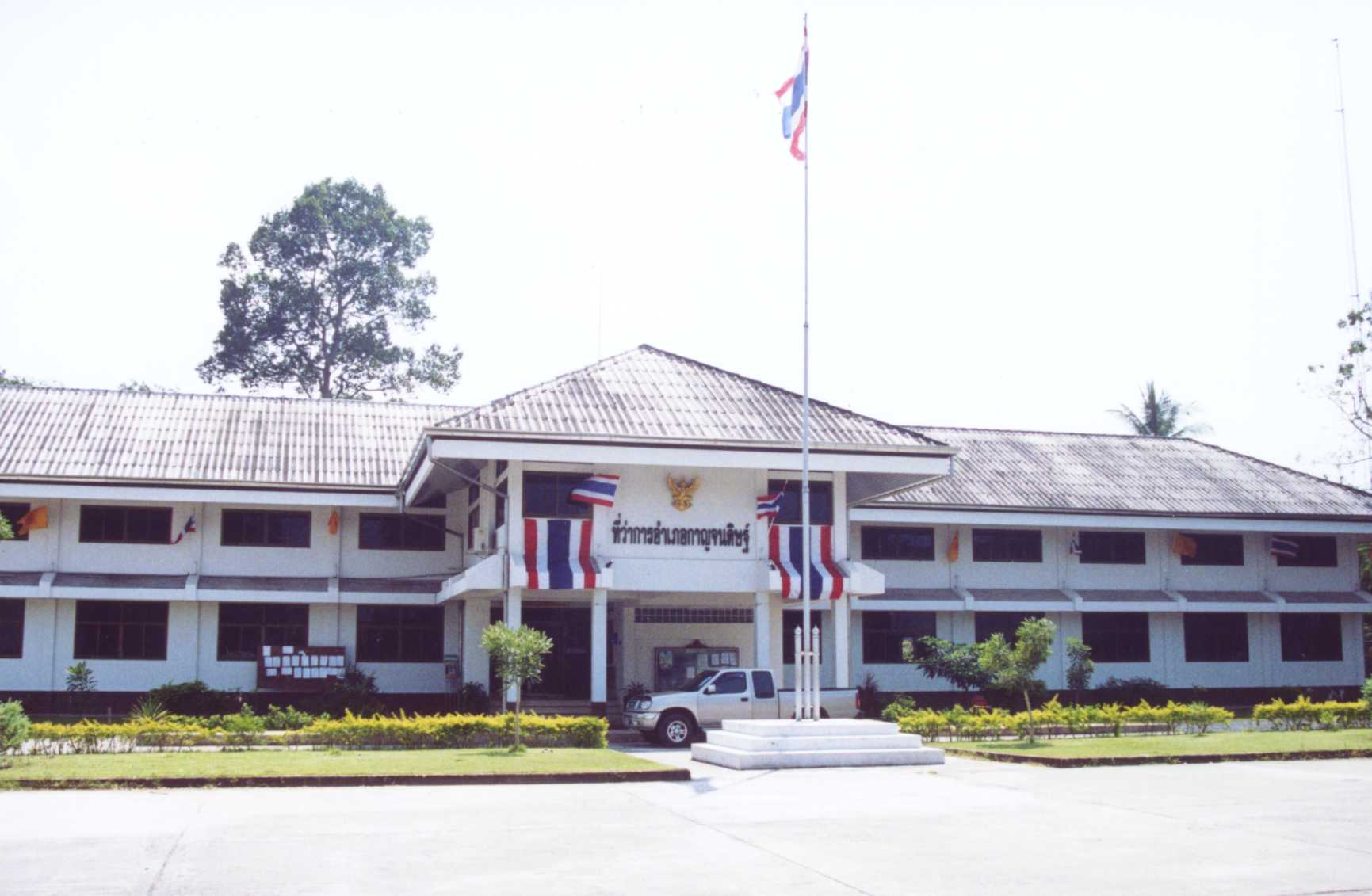
- Kanchanadit District office

- District location in Surat Thani province
- Coordinates: 9°09′56″N 99°28′16″E
- Country: Thailand
- Province: Surat Thani
- Seat: Kadae

Area
  - Total: 879.0 km^{2} (339.4 sq mi)

Population (2014)
  - Total: 103,942
  - Density: 109.8/km^{2} (284/sq mi)
- Time zone: UTC+7 (ICT)
- Postal code: 84160
- Geocode: 8402

Kanchanadit (Thai: กาญจนดิษฐ์, pronounced [kāːn.t͡ɕā.ná.dit]) is a district (amphoe) in Surat Thani province, south Thailand.

== History ==
Originally, the town was named Tha Thong (ท่าทอง) after the river of the same name (Tha Thong Mai, (named Khlong Tha Phet at the time). During the reign of King Nangklao (Rama III), the town was moved because it was malaria-infested and renamed Kanchanadit. It was a provincial town (mueang) under the control of the Nakhon Si Thammarat Kingdom. After King Mongkut took power, it was put under the supervision of Bangkok directly. In 1899, the province was merged with Chaiya and reduced to amphoe (district) status.

== Geography ==
The district is in the eastern part of the province. It stretches from the coast to Bandon Bay of the Gulf of Thailand in the north, the low river valley of the Tapi River to the west, and the Nakhon Si Thammarat mountain range in the south and west. Tai Rom Yen National Park was created on 31 December 1991, protecting the forested hills of that mountain range. The main river in the district is the Tha Thong River, which empties into the Tapi estuary.

Neighbouring districts are (from the east clockwise): Don Sak, Sichon, Nopphitam of Nakhon Si Thammarat, Ban Na San and Mueang Surat Thani.

The main road through the district is Thailand Route 401, which connects Kanchanadit with the town of Surat Thani. Thailand Route 44 begins at Route 401 and runs to the southwest as part of a land bridge across the Malay Peninsula.

== Administration ==
=== Central ===
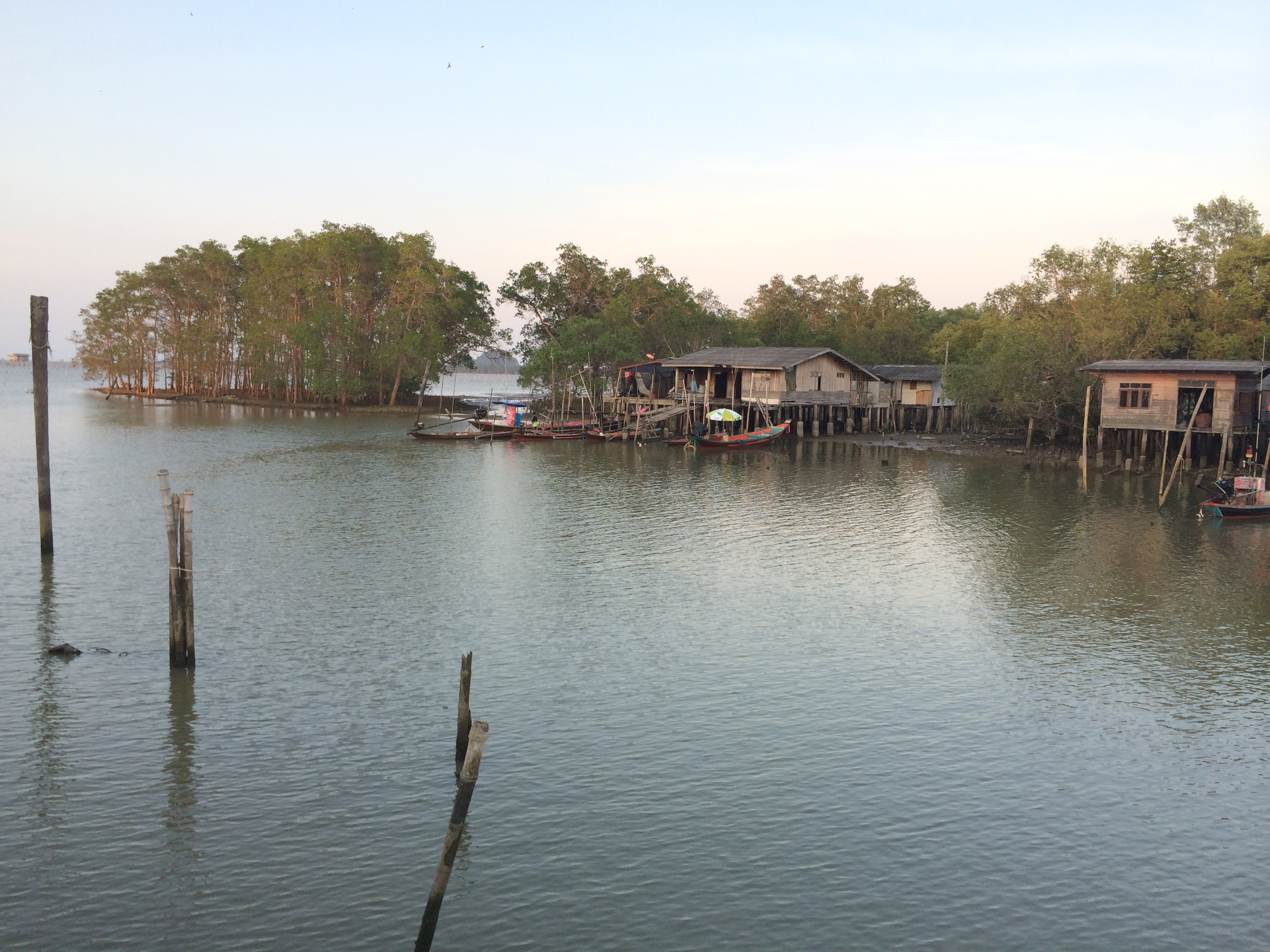
Ban Pak Nam Kadae

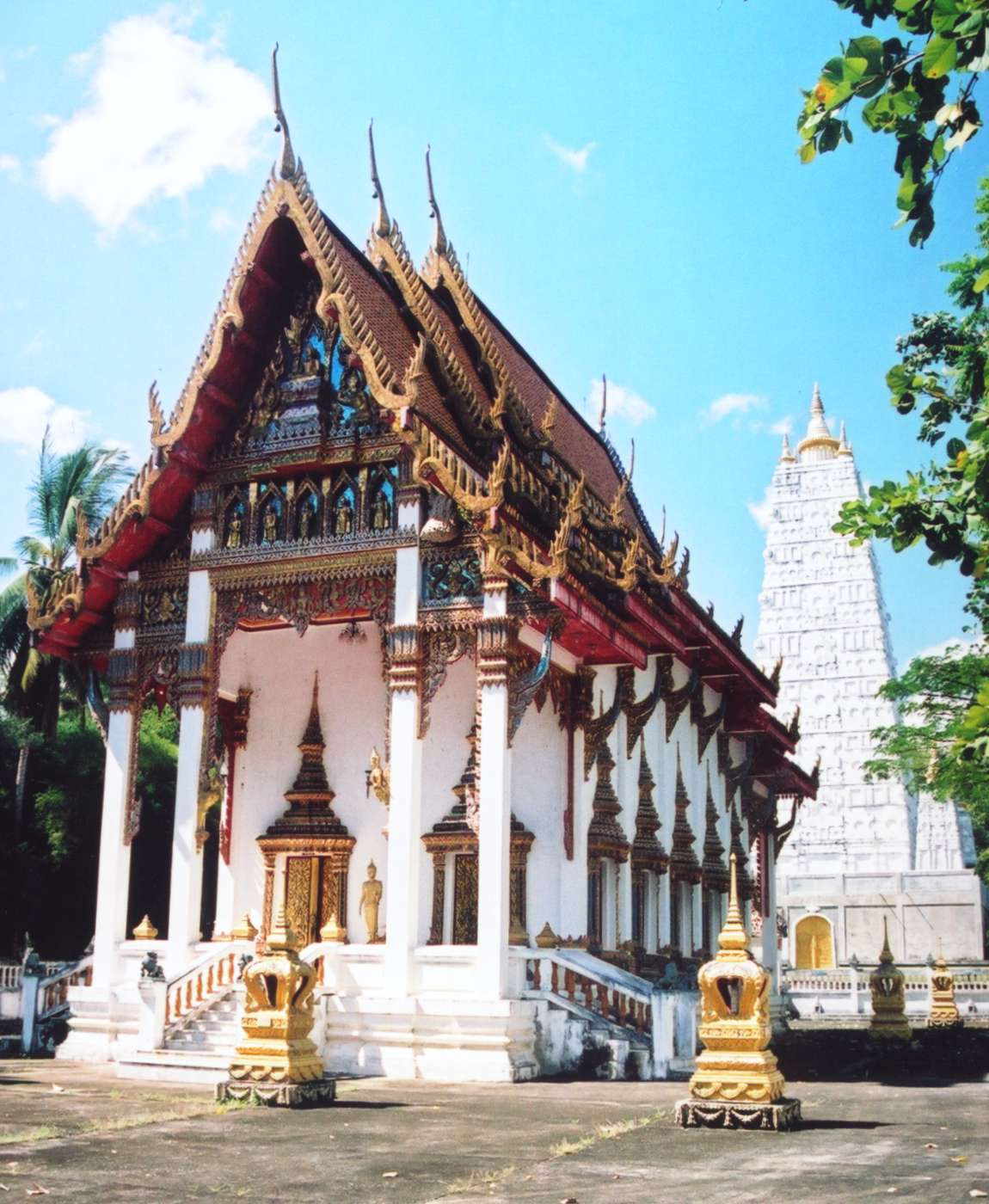
Wat Pha Na Tuayang

Kanchanadit district is divided into 13 sub-districts (tambons), which are further subdivided into 117 administrative villages (mubans).

No.	Name	Thai	Villages	Pop.
1.	Tha Thong Mai	ท่าทองใหม่	5	11,500
2.	Tha Thong	ท่าทอง	9	5,617
3.	Kadae	กะแดะ	9	9,492
4.	Thung Kong	ทุ่งกง	5	5,100
5.	Krut	กรูด	10	9,695
6.	Chang Sai	ช้างซ้าย	12	10,763
7.	Phlai Wat	พลายวาส	9	6,826
8.	Pa Ron	ป่าร่อน	9	7,647
9.	Takhian Thong	ตะเคียนทอง	7	6,373
10.	Chang Khwa	ช้างขวา	14	10,075
11.	Tha U-thae	ท่าอุแท	13	10,442
12.	Thung Rang	ทุ่งรัง	5	4,193
13.	Khlong Sa	คลองสระ	10	6,219

=== Local ===
There are five sub-district municipalities (thesaban tambons) in the district:

- Kanchanadit (Thai: เทศบาลตำบลกาญจนดิษฐ์) consisting of sub-district Kadae.
- Tha Thong Mai (Thai: เทศบาลตำบลท่าทองใหม่) consisting of parts of sub-district Tha Thong Mai.
- Chang Sai (Thai: เทศบาลตำบลช้างซ้าย) consisting of sub-district Chang Sai.
- Krut (Thai: เทศบาลตำบลกรูด) consisting of sub-district Krut.
- Chang Khwa (Thai: เทศบาลตำบลช้างขวา) consisting of sub-district Chang Khwa.

There are nine sub-district administrative organizations (SAO) in the district:

- Tha Thong Mai (Thai: องค์การบริหารส่วนตำบลท่าทองใหม่) consisting of parts of sub-district Tha Thong Mai.
- Tha Thong (Thai: องค์การบริหารส่วนตำบลท่าทอง) consisting of sub-district Tha Thong.
- Thung Kong (Thai: องค์การบริหารส่วนตำบลทุ่งกง) consisting of sub-district Thung Kong.
- Phlai Wat (Thai: องค์การบริหารส่วนตำบลพลายวาส) consisting of sub-district Phlai Wat.
- Pa Ron (Thai: องค์การบริหารส่วนตำบลป่าร่อน) consisting of sub-district Pa Ron.
- Takhian Thong (Thai: องค์การบริหารส่วนตำบลตะเคียนทอง) consisting of sub-district Takhian Thong.
- Tha U-thae (Thai: องค์การบริหารส่วนตำบลท่าอุแท) consisting of sub-district Tha U-thae.
- Thung Rang (Thai: องค์การบริหารส่วนตำบลทุ่งรัง) consisting of sub-district Thung Rang.
- Khlong Sa (Thai: องค์การบริหารส่วนตำบลคลองสระ) consisting of sub-district Khlong Sa.

== Notable people ==
- Banyat Bantadtan, politician
- Kroekrit Thaweekarn, footballer
