= Highway 44 (Thailand) =

Highway in Southern Thailand

National Highway 44
- ทางหลวงแผ่นดินหมายเลข 44
- ถนนเซาท์เทิร์นซีบอร์ด; Southern Seaboard Road

Route information
- Length: 133.172 km (82.749 mi)
- Existed: 1999–present

Major junctions
- Southwest end: Hwy 4 in Krabi Province; 8°18.11′N 98°47.03′E
- Hwy 41 / AH2 in Ban Na Doem, Surat Thani Province
- Northeast end: Hwy 401 in Surat Thani Province; 9°9.47′N 99°31.02′E

Location
- Country: Thailand
- Provinces: Krabi, Surat Thani

Highway system
- Highways in Thailand; Motorways; Asian Highways

Highway 44 as known Southern Seaboard Road; Ao Luek–Hin Ngok Highway is part of land bridge project running across the Kra Isthmus. It starts at intersection with Phetkasem highway (Highway 4) at kilometers 944+200 in Khlong Hin sub-district, Ao Luek district, Krabi province, running northeast, and ends at intersection with Highway 401 in Phlai Wat sub-district, Kanchanadit district, Surat Thani province. It roughly follows the route that a centuries-discussed Thai Canal might follow, if ever built.

Construction of Highway 44 began in 1999 by Japan International Cooperation Agency (JICA) and was completed in September 2003 at a cost of US$109.7 million or TH฿3.5 billion.

== Route details ==
Route 44 is part of land bridge project of Thailand's southern seaboard. However, the other parts of project have not yet built. Route 44 was slated to connect seaports on both the western and eastern coasts of Thailand. However, as the locations of seaports have not yet been finalized, only the central portion of Route 44 has been constructed. The roughly 50 km missing portions will be built when the location of the seaports has been finalized.

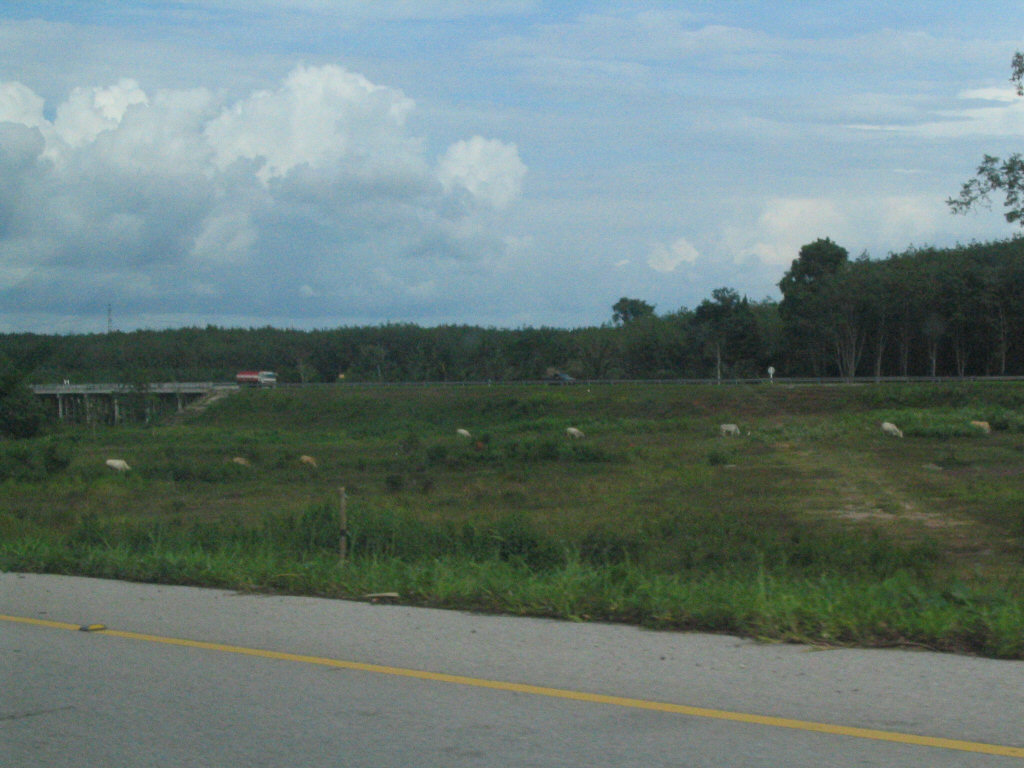
Wide ditch between directions

Route 44 is unique in that it was designed to accompany other forms of transportation. Both directions of the road were built 150 metres apart. The large centre median will be used for railroad tracks and a pipeline. However, the project is currently stalled and nothing has been built but the roadways, leaving the centre of the highway empty. There are also no crossing intersections, the only way to cross the highway is to use the U-turns or one of the few bridges.

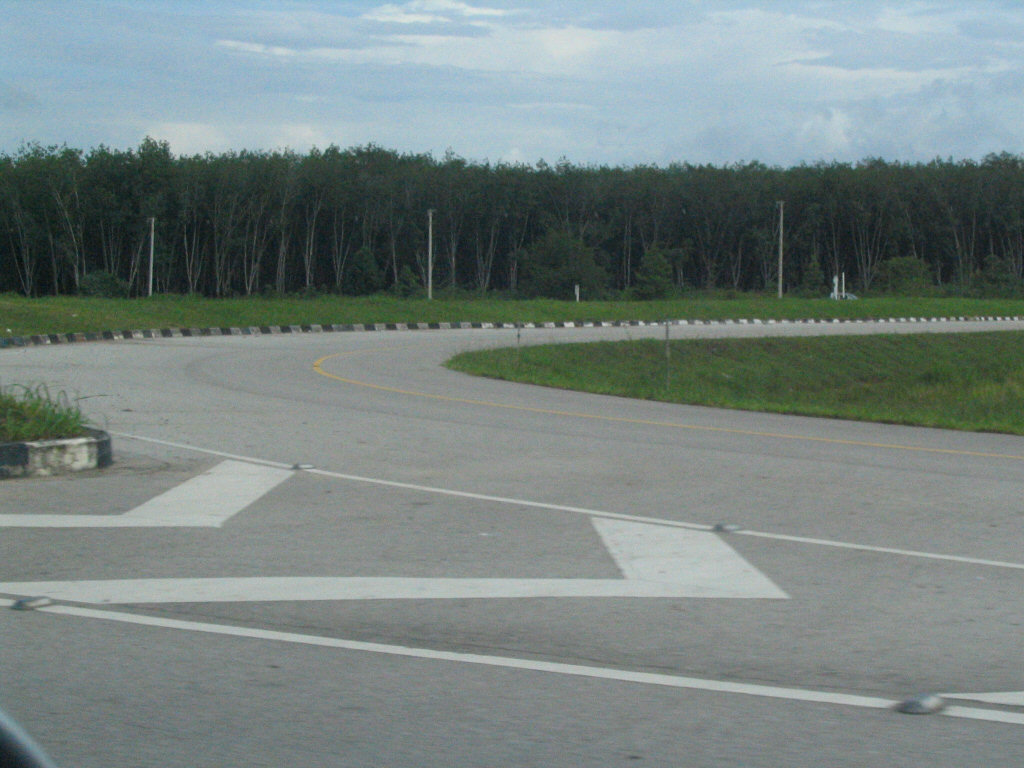
U-turn

In Krabi Province, it starts at Amphoe Ao Luek and passes through Plai Phraya. It enters Surat Thani Province at Amphoe Phrasaeng and passes through Amphoe Khian Sa, Amphoe Ban Na Doem, Amphoe Mueang Surat Thani and ends at Amphoe Kanchanadit.

Total length is about 190 (currently 133.1) km. About 40 km is in Krabi Province and 150 km in Surat Thani Province. Route 44 is asphalt for its entire length and has four lanes total, two lanes in each direction with a 150-metre-wide ditch to separate the roadways.

== List of intersections ==
Legend:

- I/C - Interchange, I/S - Intersection, RSA - Rest and service area, OBR - Overhead bridge restaurant, R/R - Restaurant and rest plaza, L/B - Layby, V/P - Vista point, TN - tunnel, T/P - Toll plaza, BR - Bridge
- C - Cloverleaf, S - Stack, T-A - Trumpet-A, T-B - Trumpet-B, DT - Directional-T/Y, SDT - Semi-Directional-T/Y, P-Y - Partial-Y, D - Diamond, P-C - Partial cloverleaf, D-D - Diverging diamond, D-R - Direct ramp

Province	District	Km	Exit	Name	Destinations	Notes
Krabi	Ao Luek	0+000		Ao Luek	Hwy 4 –Phang Nga, Phuket, Ranong, Chumphon	T-junctions
Surat Thani	Phrasaeng	45+663		Bang Sawan	Hwy 4009 (Former Highway 4035 section) – Plai Phraya, Phrasaeng	Junctions
Surat Thani	Khian Sa	79+100		Phlai Rik	Hwy 4133 – Khian Sa, Phrasaeng	Junctions
Surat Thani	Ban Na Doem	96+000	I/C	Tha Ruea	Hwy 41 / AH2 – Surat Thani, Chumphon, Bangkok, Nakhon Si Thammarat, Phatthalung, Songkhla	Junctions
Surat Thani	Mueang Surat Thani	111+500	I/C	Don Kliang	Hwy 4009 –Mueang Suratthani, Ban Nasan	Junctions
Surat Thani	Kanchanadit	133+229		Kanchanadit	Hwy 401 – Surat Thani, Chumphon, Nakhon Si Thammarat, Trang, Songkhla	T-junctions
