= Phunphin district =

Phunphin พุนพิน
- District
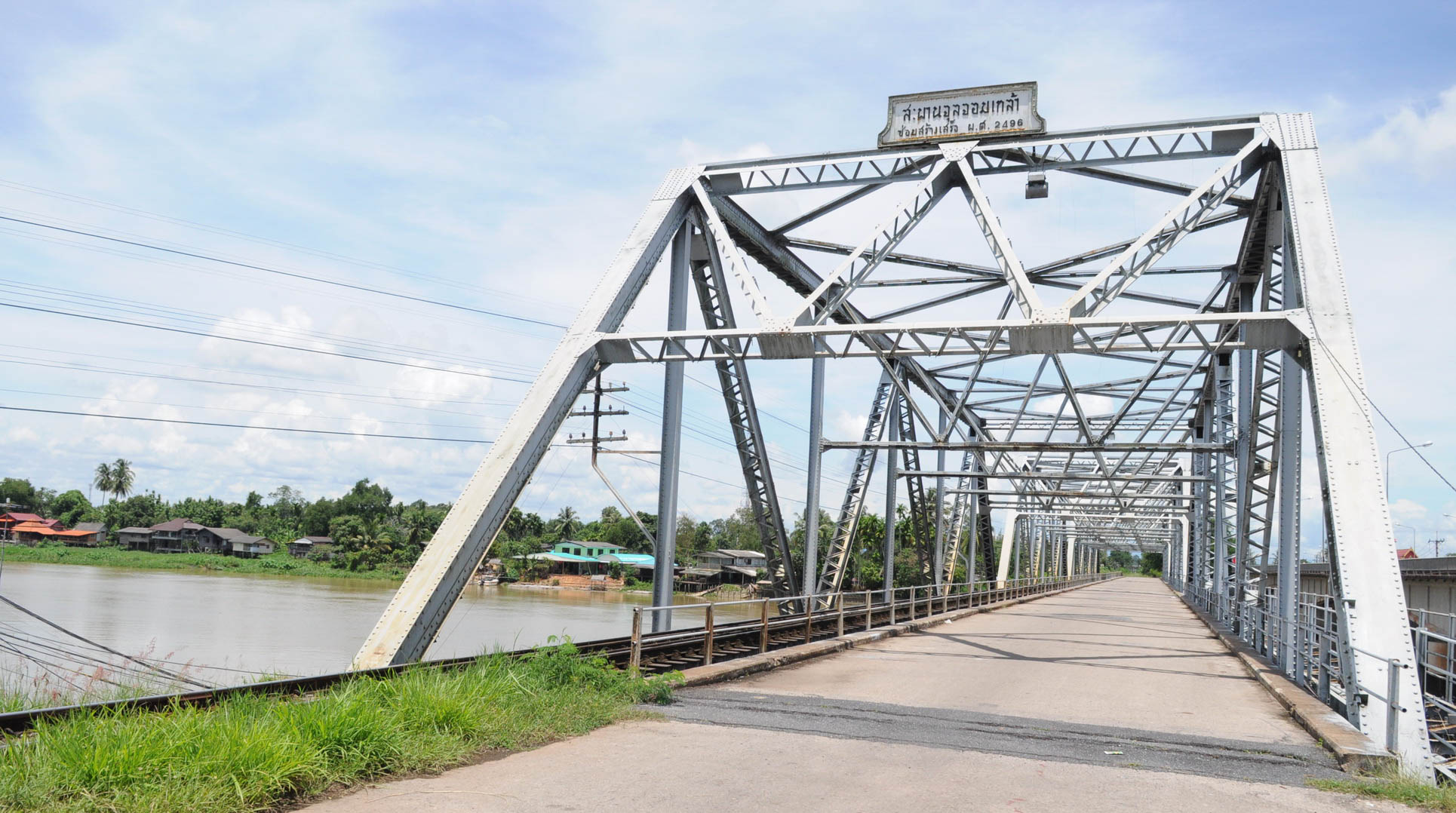
- Chulachomklao Bridge, a historic railway bridge over Tapi River near Surat Thani railway station

- District location in Surat Thani province
- Coordinates: 9°6′35″N 99°13′55″E
- Country: Thailand
- Province: Surat Thani
- Seat: Tha Kham

Area
  - Total: 1,208.7 km^{2} (466.7 sq mi)

Population (2014)
  - Total: 73,067
  - Density: 72.8/km^{2} (189/sq mi)
- Time zone: UTC+7 (ICT)
- Postal code: 84130
- Geocode: 8417

Phunphin (Thai: พุนพิน, pronounced [pʰūn.pʰīn]) is a district (amphoe) in Surat Thani province in the south of Thailand. Tha Kham is the principal town of the district. In 2014, the population was 73,067.

== Geography ==
Neighboring districts are (from north clockwise): Tha Chang, Bandon, Ban Na Doem, Khian Sa, Khiri Rat Nikhom, and Vibhavadi. It has a short coastline on Bandon Bay to the northeast.

The main rivers of the district are the Tapi and its tributary Phum Duang, which flows into the Tapi at the town of Tha Kham.

== History ==
The district's name was changed from Tha Kham to Phunphin in 1939.

== Administration ==
=== Central administration ===
Phunphin district is divided into 16 sub-districts (tambons), which are further subdivided into 98 administrative villages (mubans).

No.	Name	Thai	Villages	Pop.
1.	Tha Kham	ท่าข้าม	6	26,634
2.	Tha Sathon	ท่าสะท้อน	7	5,439
3.	Lilet	ลีเล็ด	8	4,045
4.	Bang Maduea	บางมะเดื่อ	7	4,709
5.	Bang Duean	บางเดือน	5	3,073
6.	Tha Rong Chang	ท่าโรงช้าง	5	5,483
7.	Krut	กรูด	6	5,378
8.	Phunphin	พุนพิน	3	2,322
9.	Bang Ngon	บางงอน	11	5,409
10.	Si Wichai	ศรีวิชัย	3	2,184
11.	Nam Rop	น้ำรอบ	7	2,370
12.	Maluan	มะลวน	9	7,624
13.	Hua Toei	หัวเตย	7	4,410
14.	Nong Sai	หนองไทร	5	4,320
15.	Khao Hua Khwai	เขาหัวควาย	4	4,094
16.	Tapan	ตะปาน	5	5,512

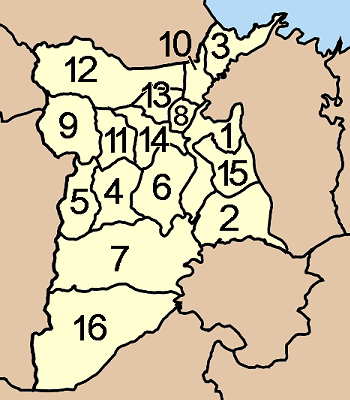

=== Local administration ===
There is one town (thesaban mueang) in the district:

- Tha Kham (Thai: เทศบาลเมืองท่าข้าม) consisting of parts of sub-district Tha Kham.

There are 16 sub-district administrative organizations (SAO) in the district:

- Tha Kham (Thai: องค์การบริหารส่วนตำบลท่าข้าม) consisting of parts of sub-district Tha Kham.
- Tha Sathon (Thai: องค์การบริหารส่วนตำบลท่าสะท้อน) consisting of sub-district Tha Sathon.
- Lilet (Thai: องค์การบริหารส่วนตำบลลีเล็ด) consisting of sub-district Lilet.
- Bang Maduea (Thai: องค์การบริหารส่วนตำบลบางมะเดื่อ) consisting of sub-district Bang Maduea.
- Bang Duean (Thai: องค์การบริหารส่วนตำบลบางเดือน) consisting of sub-district Bang Duean.
- Tha Rong Chang (Thai: องค์การบริหารส่วนตำบลท่าโรงช้าง) consisting of sub-district Tha Rong Chang.
- Krut (Thai: องค์การบริหารส่วนตำบลกรูด) consisting of sub-district Krut.
- Phunphin (Thai: องค์การบริหารส่วนตำบลพุนพิน) consisting of sub-district Phunphin.
- Bang Ngon (Thai: องค์การบริหารส่วนตำบลบางงอน) consisting of sub-district Bang Ngon.
- Si Wichai (Thai: องค์การบริหารส่วนตำบลศรีวิชัย) consisting of sub-district Si Wichai.
- Nam Rop (Thai: องค์การบริหารส่วนตำบลน้ำรอบ) consisting of sub-district Nam Rop.
- Maluan (Thai: องค์การบริหารส่วนตำบลมะลวน) consisting of sub-district Maluan.
- Hua Toei (Thai: องค์การบริหารส่วนตำบลหัวเตย) consisting of sub-district Hua Toei.
- Nong Sai (Thai: องค์การบริหารส่วนตำบลหนองไทร) consisting of sub-district Nong Sai.
- Khao Hua Khwai (Thai: องค์การบริหารส่วนตำบลเขาหัวควาย) consisting of sub-district Khao Hua Khwai.
- Tapan (Thai: องค์การบริหารส่วนตำบลตะปาน) consisting of sub-district Tapan.

== Transport ==
Phunphin is the transportation hub of Surat Thani Province. It has one railway intersection, three railway stations, and four rail stops. Surat Thani Railway Station in this district is the main passenger railway station of Surat Thani Province. At the Ban Thung Pho junction (km631) the southern railway branches to what was originally intended to connect the railway to Takua Thung district, Phang Nga, just north of Phuket province. After the completion of 31 km of the railroad to Khiri Ratthanikhom in 1956, construction was halted for budgetary reasons.

Also in Phunphin are the Surat Thani Airport, the Inland Container Depot (ICD), and the Asian highway AH2 (Thai Hwy 41), the main road connecting to other provinces. Thai Hwy 401 connects Phunphin with the town of Surat Thani.
