= Highway 403 (Thailand) =

Road in Thailand

Highway 403 is a road in Thailand that is divided into 3 sections. The first section starts at Amphoe Mueang Nakhon Si Thammarat. It goes south-westward and join Route 41 at Suan Pak junction. The 2nd section starts at Chong Khao junction. It goes westward to Amphoe Thung Song, then goes southward and join with Route 4 near Amphoe Huai Yot. The 3rd sections starts at Amphoe Mueang Trang. It goes south-westward and ends at Amphoe Kantang

== Route Details ==
Route 403 is main road that connect Nakhon Si Thammarat and Trang. The 1st section starts at Hua Thanon junction in Amphoe Mueang Nakhon Si Thammarat. The junction also the start of Route 408 and route 4013. All of first section is 4-land (2 lane per direction) asphalt with island as median between direction. It goes south-westward with almost level. It joins Route 41 at Suan Pak junction. Total length is about 35 km.

Second section starts at Chong Khao junction. It separate from Route 41 on the north. It goes westward parallel to Route 41. First few kilometer of this section is 2-lane asphalt and run along hill shoulder. Then, it is widen to 4-lane and goes into Amphoe Thung Song. It turns left to the south, pass Route 41 and goes into Trang Province. It finally ends by joining with Route 4 near Amphoe Huai Yot. Total length is about 44 km.

Third section start at Amphoe Mueang Trang. It goes south-westward and ends at Amphoe Kantang. Total length is about 20 km.

Originally, the first and second sections were connected. However, when Route 41 section Surat Thani - Thung Song - Phatthalung was constructed, Route 403 from Suan Pak junction to Chong Khao junction, which is the section that cross the mountain, was reassign as part of Route 41.

== List of Intersection ==
=== Nakhon Si Thammarat Province ===
- (Start 1st section) Ratchadamnuen Rd. (northward to Nakhon Si Thammarat), Route 408 (southward to Amphoe Chaloem Phra Kiat, Songkhla Province), Route 4013 (eastward to Amphoe Pak Phanang)
- Route 4103 (northward to Amphoe Tha Sala, south-eastward to Amphoe Chaloem Phra Kiat, Songkhla Province)
- Route 4238 (north-westward to Amphoe Lan Saka)
- Route 4018 (southward to Amphoe Chulabhorn)
- (End 1st section) Route 41 #1 (westward to Amphoe Thung Song, Surat Thani Province, eastward to Amphoe Chulabhorn, Phatthalung Province)
- (Start 2nd section) Route 41 #2 (westward to Amphoe Thung Song, Surat Thani Province, eastward to Amphoe Ron Phibun, Phatthalung Province)
- Route 41 #3 (westward to Surat Thani Province, eastward to Amphoe Ron Phibun, Phatthalung Province)
- Route 4151 (westward to Amphoe Bang Khan, eastward to Amphoe Chulabhorn)

=== Trang Province ===
- (End 2nd section) Route 4 (westward to Amphoe Wang Wiset, Krabi Province, eastward to Amphoe Huai Yot, Trang Province)
