= Banthat =

Banthat, Thai: บรรทัด, or Khao Banthat, บรรทัด, may refer to:

- The Cardamom Mountains, a mountain range in the south west of Cambodia and Eastern Thailand
- Nakhon Si Thammarat mountain range, a mountain range on the Malay peninsula in southern Thailand, a section of the Tenasserim Hills
- Khao Banthat (Thai: เขาบรรทัด), a 374 m high summit located at the western end of the Dangrek Mountains, Thailand
