= Bang Bai Mai =

Subdistrict in, Thailand

Coordinates: 9.151178°N 99.306061°E

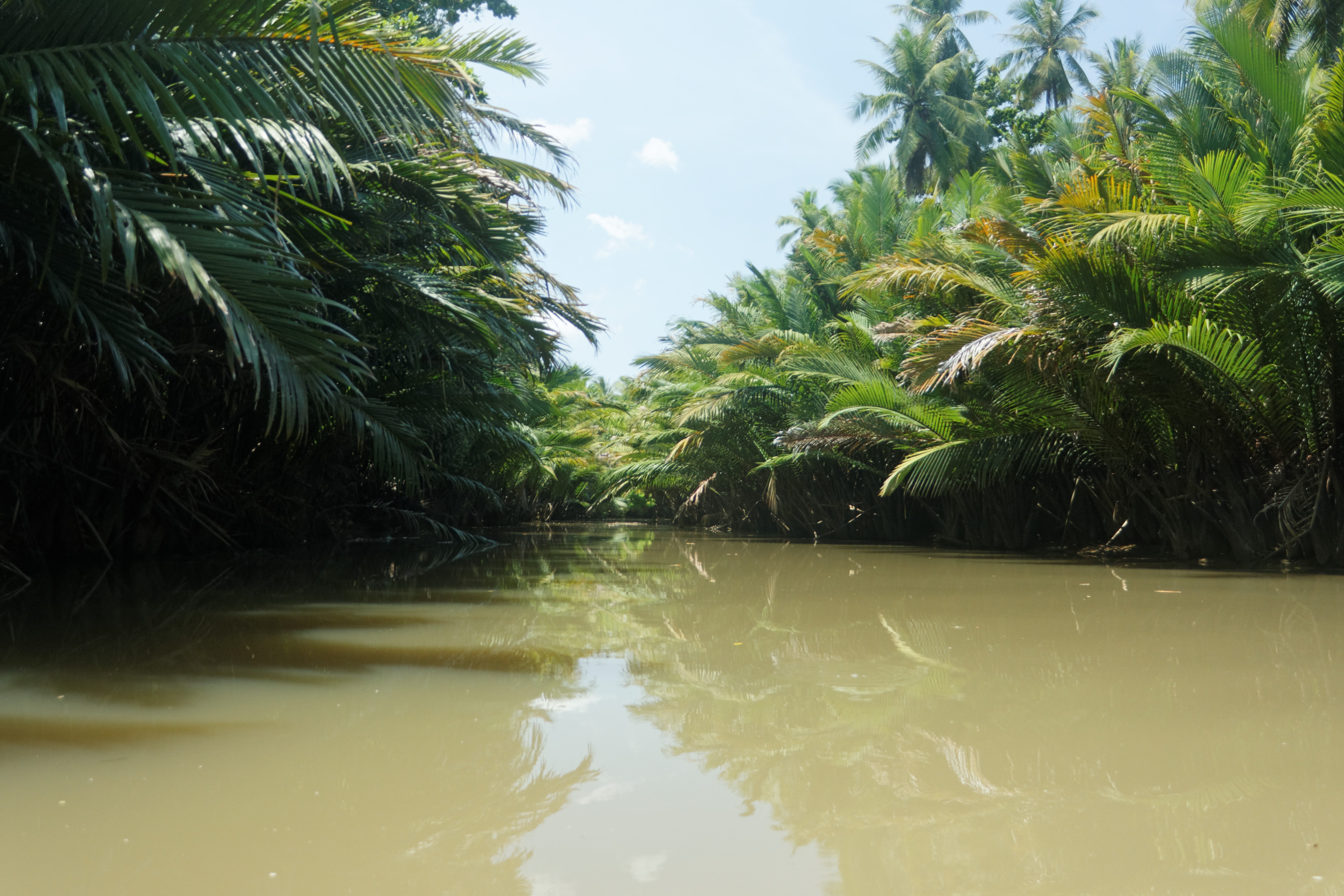
Khlong Bang Bai Mai, an eponymous

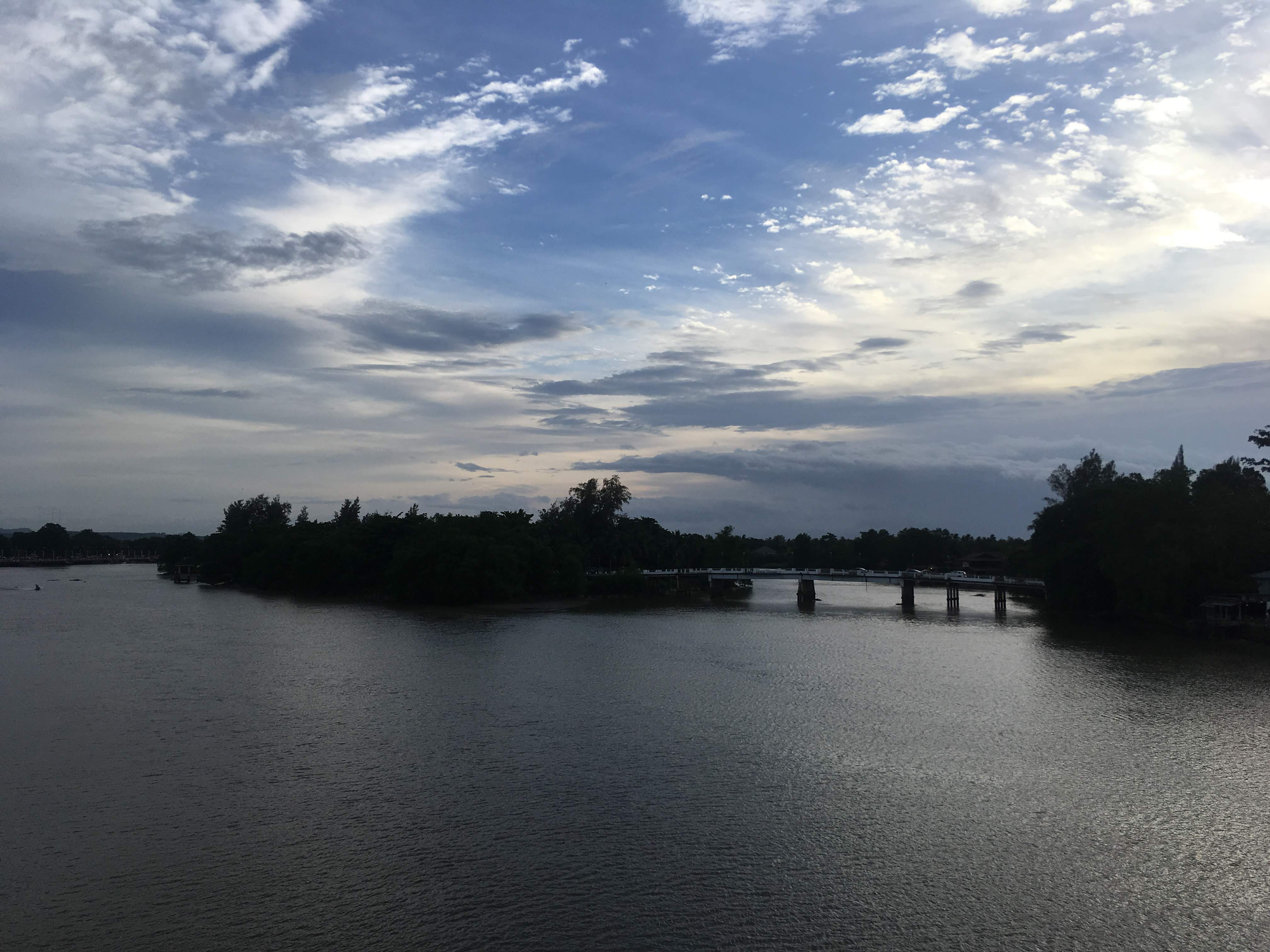
Ko Lamphu, Tapi river isle

Bang Bai Mai (Thai: บางใบไม้, pronounced [bāːŋ bāj máːj]) is a tambon (subdistrict) of Mueang Surat Thani District, Surat Thani Province, southern Thailand.

== History & toponymy ==
It is said that Bang Bai Mai in the past, there was a warlord who migrated his family from neighbouring Nakhon Si Thammarat to settle here, because it is a fertile area suitable for cultivation and he himself has had descendants inherited to the present.

Its name "Bang Bai Mai" means "place of leaves", owing to the large number of leaves piled up in the khlong (canal) that flows through the area.

== Geography ==
Most of the area is a lowland with a river running through it. Along both sides of the Khlong Bang Bai Mai is mixed deciduous forest. It is located 2 km (1.2 mi) from the district office.

Its adjacent places, clockwise from the north, are Bang Sai, Bang Chana, Tapi River, and Bang Sai again. All are within its district.

Bang Bai Mai earned the nickname "Khlong Roi Sai" (คลองร้อยสาย, pronounced [kʰlɔ̄ːŋ rɔ́ːj sǎːj], "a hundred canals") because there are hundreds of small waterways connected to each other. All of them flow to confluence the Tapi River, a main watercourse.

== Administration ==
Bang Bai Mai is governed by two local government bodies: Surat Thani City Municipality and Subdistrict Administrative Organization (SAO) Bang Bai Mai.

As for the SAO Bang Bai Mai, there are still five muban (village).

== Places ==
- Wat Bang Bai Mai
- Ko Lamphu
- Surat Thani City Pillar Shrine
