= Lamphun (disambiguation) =

Lamphun may refer to these places in Thailand:

- the town Lamphun
- Lamphun Province
- Mueang Lamphun district
- Lamphun district, the present-day Ban Na San district, Surat Thani Province
