= Wiang Sa district, Surat Thani =

Wiang Sa เวียงสระ
- District
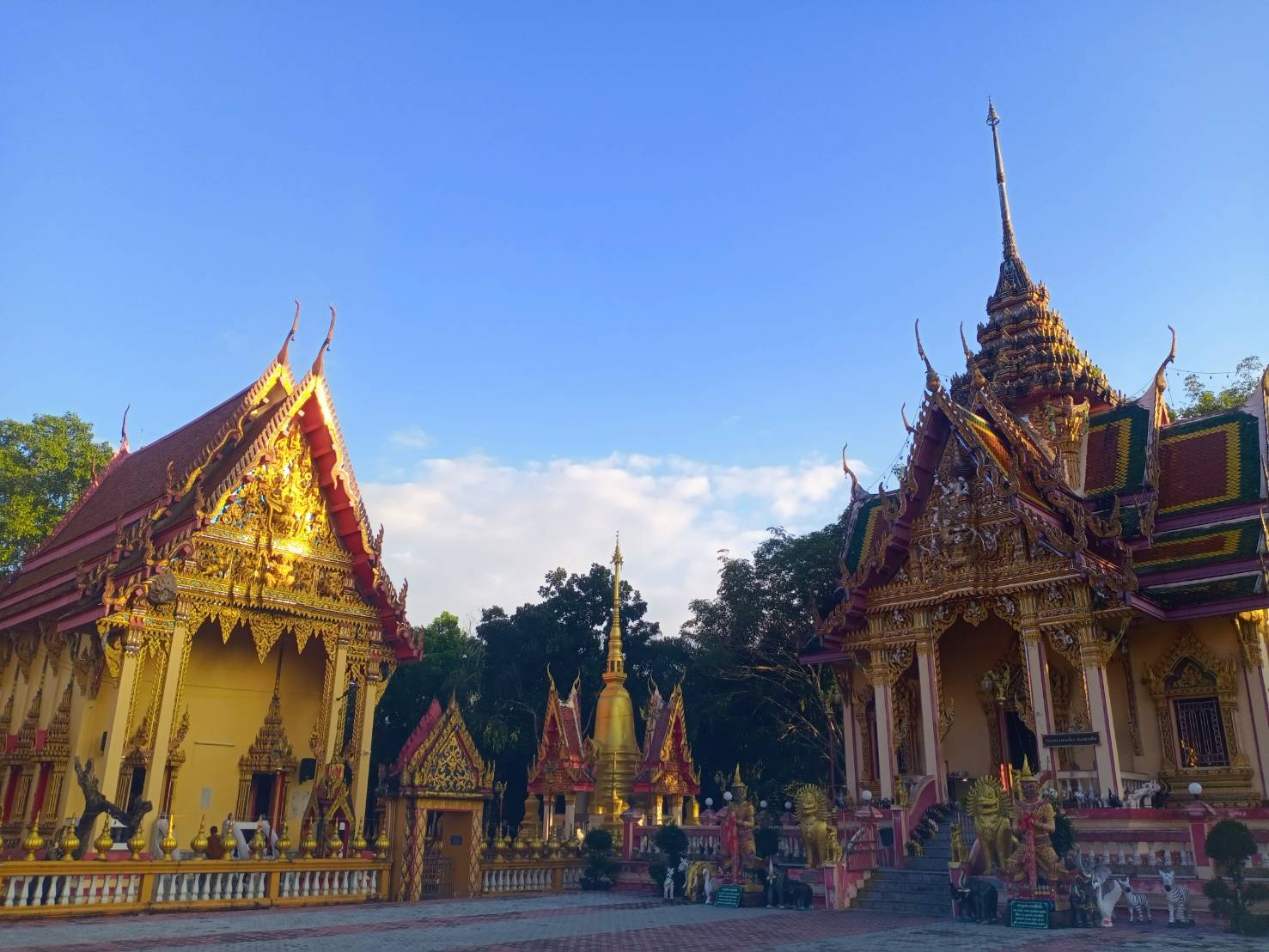
- Wat Thung Luang

- District location in Surat Thani province
- Coordinates: 8°37′47″N 99°20′35″E
- Country: Thailand
- Province: Surat Thani
- Seat: Wiang Sa

Area
  - Total: 427.6 km^{2} (165.1 sq mi)

Population (2005)
  - Total: 41,030
  - Density: 96/km^{2} (250/sq mi)
- Time zone: UTC+7 (ICT)
- Postal code: 84190
- Geocode: 8415

Wiang Sa (Thai: เวียงสระ, pronounced [wīa̯ŋ sàʔ]) is a district (amphoe) of Surat Thani province, Thailand.

== Geography ==
Wiang Sa is in the southeast Surat Thani Province. Neighboring districts are (from the west clockwise) Phrasaeng, Khian Sa, and Ban Na San of Surat Thani, and Phipun, Chawang, and Tham Phannara of Nakhon Si Thammarat province.

The Tapi River forms the western boundary of the district. Smaller rivers in the district are Khlong Nam Thao, Khlong Tan and Khlong Chanuan. To the west the terrain descends to the Tapi plain, to the east are the hills of the Nakhon Si Thammarat mountain range.

In the northeast of the district is Tai Romyen National Park.

== History ==
Wiang Sa originated as a minor city-state (mueang) under the control of Nakhon Si Thammarat after the Srivijaya times. It was converted into a district named Khlong Tan (คลองตาล) during the thetsaban reforms at the end of the 19th century. In 1896 Wiang Sa was reduced to a tambon within Lamphun District, the current Ban Na San district. On 10 March 1968 Wiang Sa became a minor district (king amphoe) by splitting off tambons Wiang Sa and Thung Luang from Ban Na San District. On 17 November 1971 it was upgraded to full district status.

== Administration ==
Wiang Sa is divided into five sub-districts (tambons), which are further subdivided into 64 villages (mubans). There are three townships (thesaban tambons): Wiang Sa covering parts of tambons Wiang Sa and Ban Song, Ban Song covering the remaining parts of tambon Ban Song, and Khao Niphan covering tambon Khao Nipham. The three tambons which are not completely covered by municipal area each have a tambon administrative organization (TAO).

| No. | Name | Thai name | Villages | Pop. |
|---|---|---|---|---|
| 1. | Wiang Sa | เวียงสระ | 10 | 9,696 |
| 2. | Ban Song | บ้านส้อง | 18 | 6,725 |
| 3. | Khlong Chanuan | คลองฉนวน | 12 | 8,382 |
| 4. | Thung Luang | ทุ่งหลวง | 16 | 10,374 |
| 5. | Khao Niphan | เขานิพันธ์ | 8 | 5,853 |

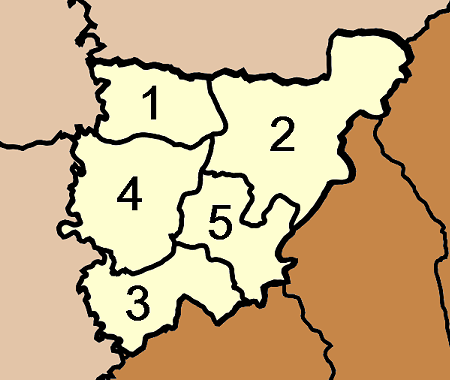
