= Nakhon Si Thammarat (disambiguation) =

Nakhon Si Thammarat is a municipality in Southern Thailand.

Nakhon Si Thammarat may also refer to:

- Nakhon Si Thammarat province, the province in which the municipality is located
- Mueang Nakhon Si Thammarat district, the capital district (amphoe mueang) of the province, in which the municality is located
- Nakhon Si Thammarat Kingdom, a historical kingdom
- Monthon Nakhon Si Thammarat, a historical administrative unit of the early 20th century and successor of the kingdom
- Nakhon Si Thammarat Range, a mountain range, also known as Banthat range
