= Nopphitam district =

Nopphitam นบพิตำ
- District
- Khao Chang Lon Sea Of Mist Viewpoint, Khao Lek Temple, Krung Ching Waterfall
- District location in Nakhon Si Thammarat province
- Coordinates: 8°43′10″N 99°45′6″E
- Country: Thailand
- Province: Nakhon Si Thammarat
- Seat: Nopphitam

Area
  - Total: 720.156 km^{2} (278.054 sq mi)

Population (2022)
  - Total: 33,770
  - Density: 46.74/km^{2} (121.1/sq mi)
- Time zone: UTC+7 (ICT)
- Postal code: 80160
- Geocode: 8021

Nopphitam (Thai: นบพิตำ, pronounced [nóp.pʰí(ʔ).tām]) is a district (amphoe) of Nakhon Si Thammarat province, southern Thailand.

== History ==
The district was founded on 1 April 1995 by splitting off the four western tambons from Tha Sala district.

On 15 May 2007, all 81 minor districts were upgraded to full districts. On 24 August, the upgrade became official.

== Geography ==
Neighboring districts are (from the northeast clockwise): Sichon, Tha Sala, Phrom Khiri and Phipun of Nakhon Si Thammarat Province and Ban Na San and Kanchanadit of Surat Thani province.

Nopphitam contains the northernmost part of the Khao Luang National Park, protecting a large part of the Nakhon Si Thammarat mountain range.

== Administration ==
The district is divided into four sub-districts (tambons), which are further subdivided into 38 villages (mubans).

No.	Name	Thai name	Villages	Pop.
1.	Nopphitam	นบพิตำ	9	7,539
2.	Krung Ching	กรุงชิง	11	8,185
3.	Karo	กะหรอ	9	7,039
4.	Na Reng	นาเหรง	9	6,907

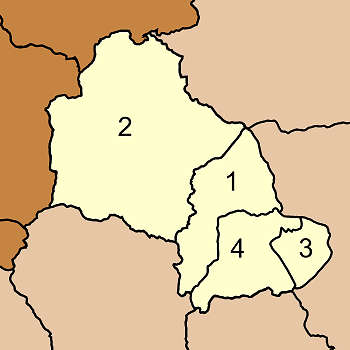

=== Local administration ===
There is one sub-district municipality (thesaban tambon) in the district:

- Na Reng (Thai: เทศบาลตำบลนาเหรง) consisting of sub-district Na Reng.

There are three tambon administrative organisations (TAO) in the district:

- Nopphitam (Thai: องค์การบริหารส่วนตำบลนบพิตำ) consisting of sub-district Nopphitam.
- Krung Ching (Thai: องค์การบริหารส่วนตำบลกรุงชิง) consisting of sub-district Krung Ching.
- Karo (Thai: องค์การบริหารส่วนตำบลกะหรอ) consisting of sub-district Karo.
