= Motorway 8 (Thailand) =

Highway in Thailand

Motorway Route 8
- ทางหลวงพิเศษหมายเลข 8
- Nakhon Pathom - Cha-Am Motorway ทางหลวงพิเศษสายนครปฐม−ชะอำ

Route information
- Maintained by Department of Highways

Major junctions
- North end: Phet Kasem Road / Borommaratchachonnani Road
- South end: Malaysia

Location
- Country: Thailand

Highway system
- Highways in Thailand; Motorways; Asian Highways

Intercity Motorway 8, or popularly known as the "Southern Motorway." is an intercity motorway project originating in Nakhon Chai Si District, Nakhon Pathom Province, extending southward to terminate in Su-ngai Kolok District, Narathiwat Province. It forms part of the route network outlined in the intercity motorway master plan approved by the 52nd Cabinet on April 22, 1997.
