= Khao Luang =

Mountain in southern Thailand

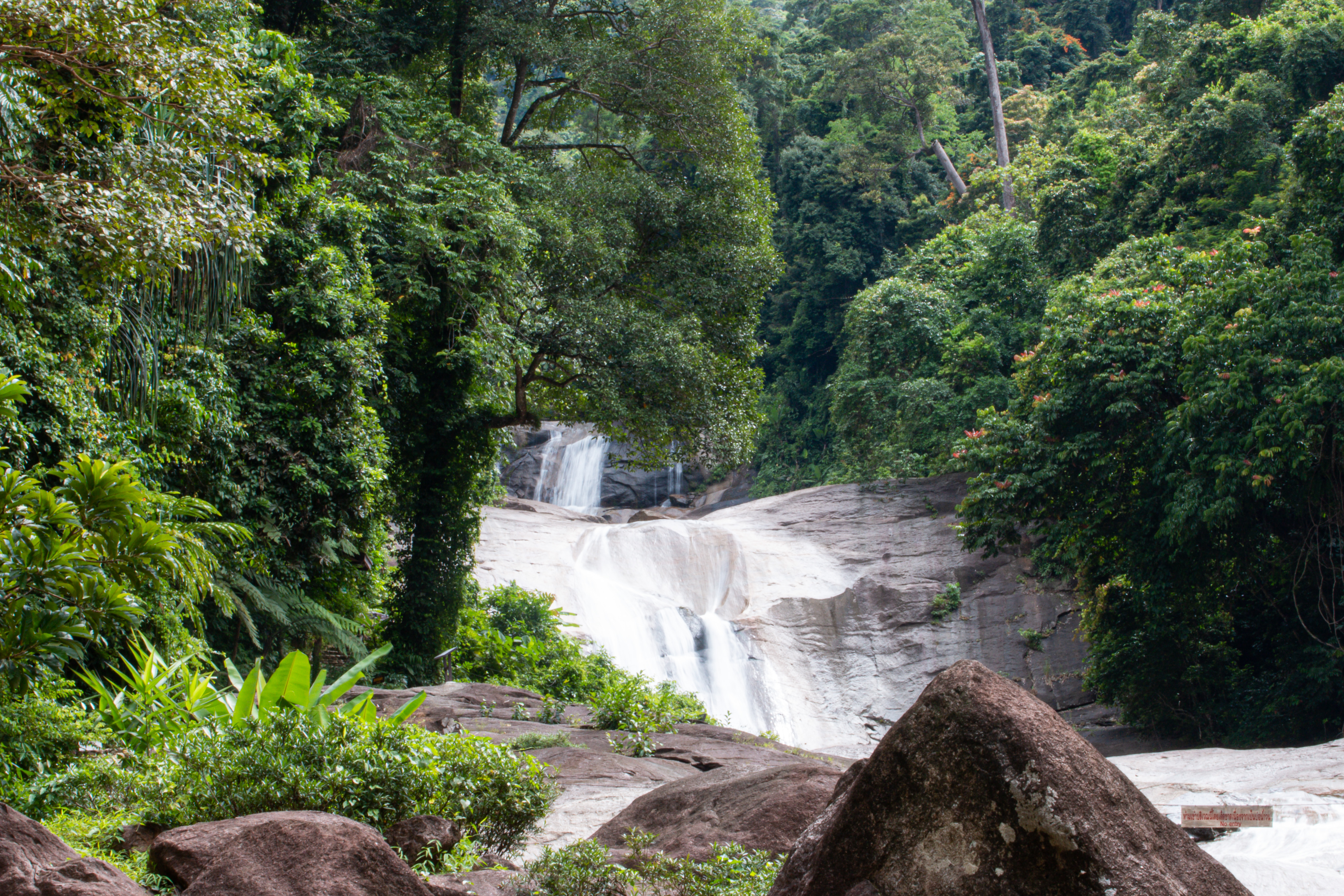

Highest point
- Elevation: 1,780 m (5,840 ft)
- Prominence: 1,715 m (5,627 ft)
- Listing: Ultra; Ribu; List of mountains in Thailand
- Coordinates: 8°30′N 99°44′E

Geography
- Location within Thailand
- Location: Nakhon Si Thammarat Province, Thailand
- Parent range: Nakhon Si Thammarat Range (Southern Tenasserim Hills)

Geology
- Mountain type: granite

Khao Luang (Thai: เขาหลวง, pronounced [kʰǎw lǔa̯ŋ]) is the tallest mountain in southern Thailand. It is in Nakhon Si Thammarat Province.

== Geography ==
The Khao Luang mountain is the highest summit of a massif of several hills with steep slopes. It is part of the Nakhon Si Thammarat Range, a subrange of the Tenasserim Hills.

Geologically this mountain formation consists of a granite core under loose soils. On steep slopes, the soil covering the mountains can cause landslides when saturated with water.

Some of the forests of the area were felled to make way for rubber plantations.

== Khao Luang National Park ==
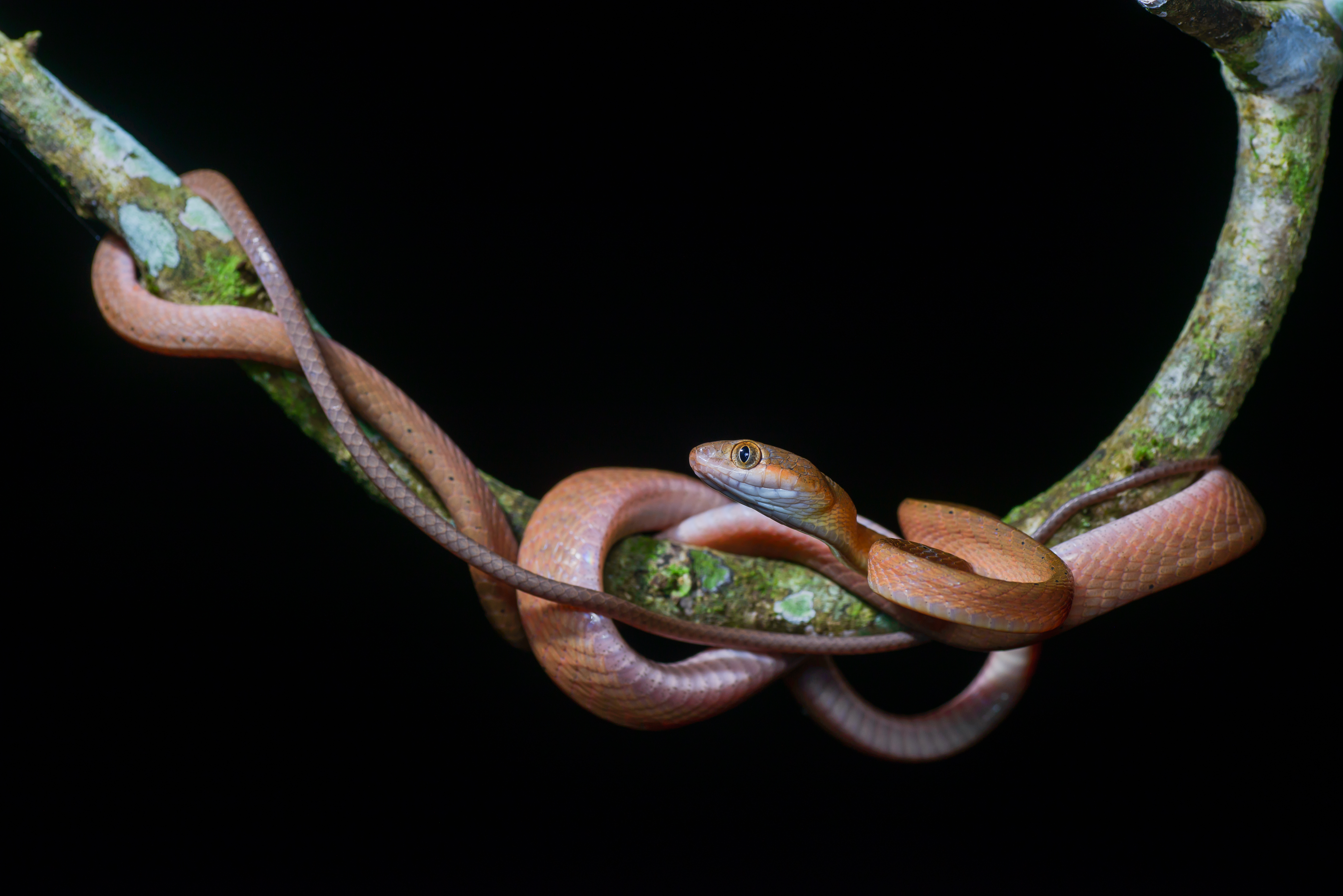
Boiga nigriceps photographed inside the park

Khao Luang National Park is named after Khao Luang mountain. The park is mountainous with many tall peaks along its range.

The park covers an area of 356,250 rai ~ 570 square kilometres (220 sq mi) with a large variety of wildlife and habitats, including mountains, forests, rivers and waterfalls. The park was designated a national park on 18 December 1974, becoming the ninth national park in Thailand. The headquarters of the park is 30 kilometres (19 mi) from the town of Nakhon Si Thammarat.

The mountainous park is a watershed for the Tapee River, Pakphanang River, Klai River and Pakpoon River, Nopphitam.

=== Climate ===
Due to the park's location on the peninsula, it receives monsoons from both the east and the west coasts and means that the park receives rain all year and also cold weather. There are two main seasons. Rainy season from May to January with the heaviest rainfall between October and December. Hot season is between February and April. Over the year the park receives approximately 3,500–4,500 millimetres (140–180 in) of rainfall. The highest temperatures range from 28 °C (82 °F) to 30 °C (86 °F) and the lowest from 15 °C (59 °F) to 15 °C (59 °F)in January and February.

=== Flora and fauna ===
Moist evergreen forest, which can be found in the valleys and in damp gullies and riversides. Hill evergreen forest and lower montaine forest. Over 300 species of orchids can be seen within the park. Khao Luang is the only place in the world where some of these can be found. There are no fewer than 327 species of animals living in Khao Luang, some of these include; Malayan tapir, Sumatran serow, pig-tailed macaque, Asiatic brush-tailed porcupine, clouded leopard, barking deer, sambar deer, binturong, panther, tiger, wild pig, banded langur and spectacled langur. Bird species include black eagle, red junglefowl, great argus pheasant, crested fireback pheasant, white-crowned hornbill, bushy-crested hornbill, great pied hornbill, helmeted hornbill, red-crowned barbet and sunbirds.

== Location ==
Khao Luang National Park in overview PARO 5 (Nakhon Si Thammarat)

7) Khao Luang National Park in overview PARO 5

	National park
3	Hat Khanom-Mu Ko Thale Tai
4	Hat Noppharat Thara-Mu Ko Phi Phi
7	Khao Luang
8	Khao Nan
9	Khao Phanom Bencha
14	Namtok Si Khit
15	Namtok Yong

	Wildlife sanctuary
21	Kathun
23	Khlong Phraya

	Non-hunting area
25	Bo Lo
30	Laem Talumpuk

== Similarly named locations ==
There are other mountains called "Khao Luang" at other locations in Thailand:

- Khao Luang, Hui Yang, Prachuap Khiri Khan Province, Namtok Huai Yang National Park.
- Khao Luang (92 m) and Khao Luang Cave, Hua Hin.
- Khao Luang Cave Temple near Phetchaburi.

== See also ==
- List of mountains in Thailand
- List of ultras of Southeast Asia
- Nakhon Si Thammarat Province
- List of national parks of Thailand
- DNP - Khao Luang National Park
- List of Protected Areas Regional Offices of Thailand
