= Khian Sa district =

Khian Sa เคียนซา
- District
- District location in Surat Thani province
- Coordinates: 8°50′27″N 99°11′39″E
- Country: Thailand
- Province: Surat Thani
- Seat: Khian Sa

Area
  - Total: 583.6 km^{2} (225.3 sq mi)

Population (2005)
  - Total: 42,619
  - Density: 73.03/km^{2} (189.1/sq mi)
- Time zone: UTC+7 (ICT)
- Postal code: 84260
- Geocode: 8414

Khian Sa (Thai: เคียนซา, pronounced [kʰīa̯n sāː]) is a district (amphoe) in Surat Thani province, Thailand.

Neighboring districts are (from the north clockwise) Khiri Rat Nikhom, Phunphin, Ban Na Doem, Ban Na San, Wiang Sa, Phrasaeng and Phanom. Khian Sa is about 60 kilometres from Surat Thani.

== Geography ==
The district is in the Khian Sa basin, which is crossed by the Tapi River, which also forms part of the eastern boundary of the district. The area of the district is mostly used for palm farming or rubber plantations, while along the river are wetlands like the Nong Thung Thong swamp.

The main road through the district is Thailand Route 44, which connects Krabi with Khanom.

== History ==
The district was formed as a minor district (king amphoe) on 15 December 1970, splitting the two tambons Khian Sa and Phuang Phromkhon from Ban Na San District. On 1 April 1974 it was elevated to full district status.

== Administration ==
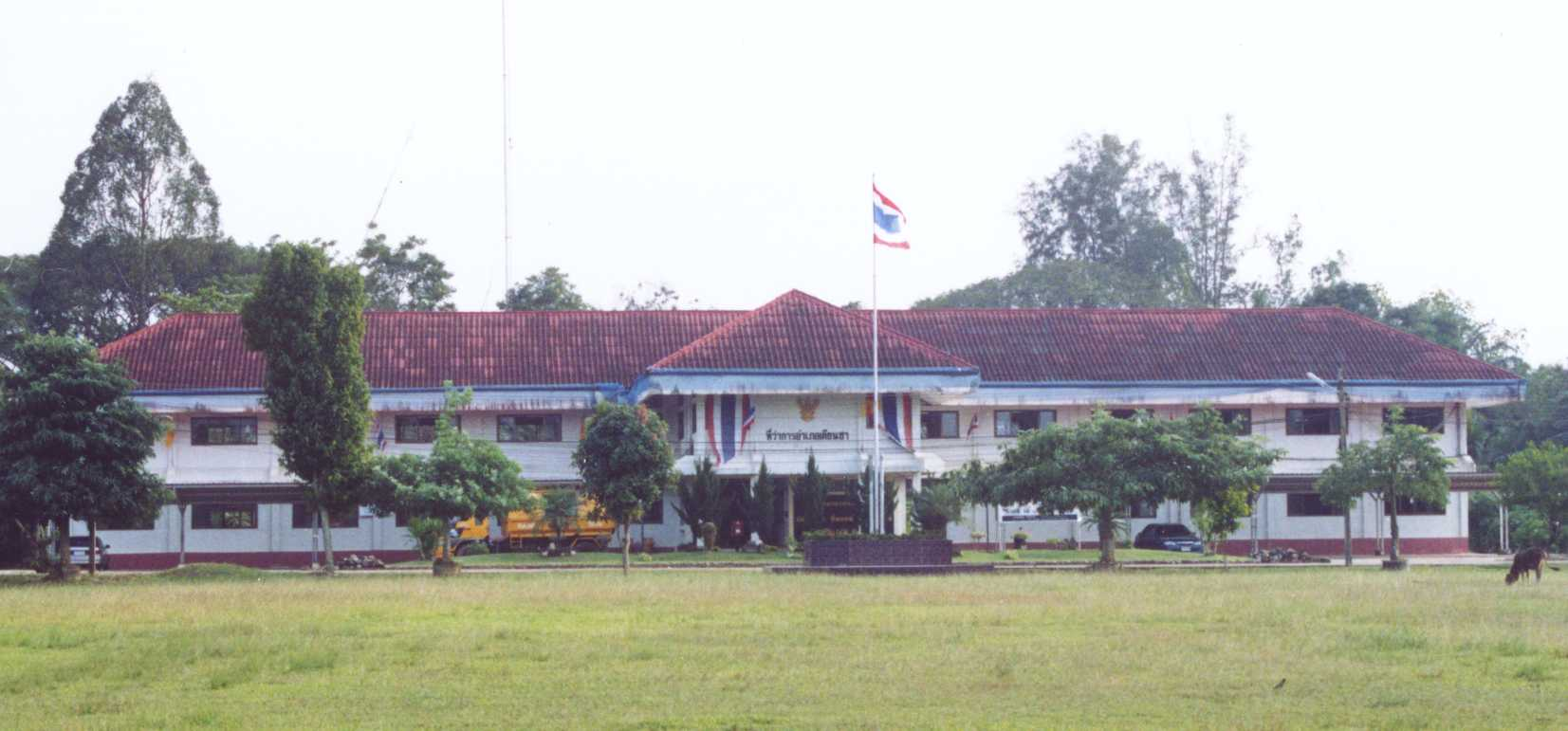
District office

The district is divided into five sub-districts (tambons), which in turn are further subdivided into 52 villages (mubans). Khian Sa has township status (thesaban tambon), covering parts of tambon Khian Sa. Each of the tambons is administered by a tambon administrative office (TAO).

No.	Name	Thai name	Villages	Pop.
1.	Khian Sa	เคียนซา	7	7,214
2.	Phuang Phromkhon	พ่วงพรมคร	13	10,496
3.	Khao Tok	เขาตอก	6	3,635
4.	Aranyakham Wari	อรัญคามวารี	6	4,392
5.	Ban Sadet	บ้านเสด็จ	20	16,882

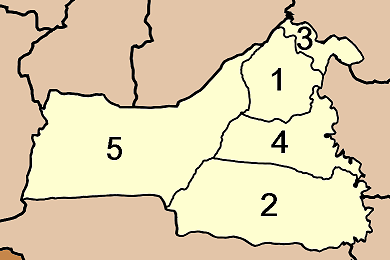
