= Phet Kasem Road =

Road in Thailand

ถนนเพชรเกษม Thanon Phetkasem
- ทางหลวงแผ่นดินหมายเลข 4
- ถนนเลียบชายฝั่งพม่า, ถนนกาญจนวณิชย์ Thanon Kanchanawanit, Burma Coast Road
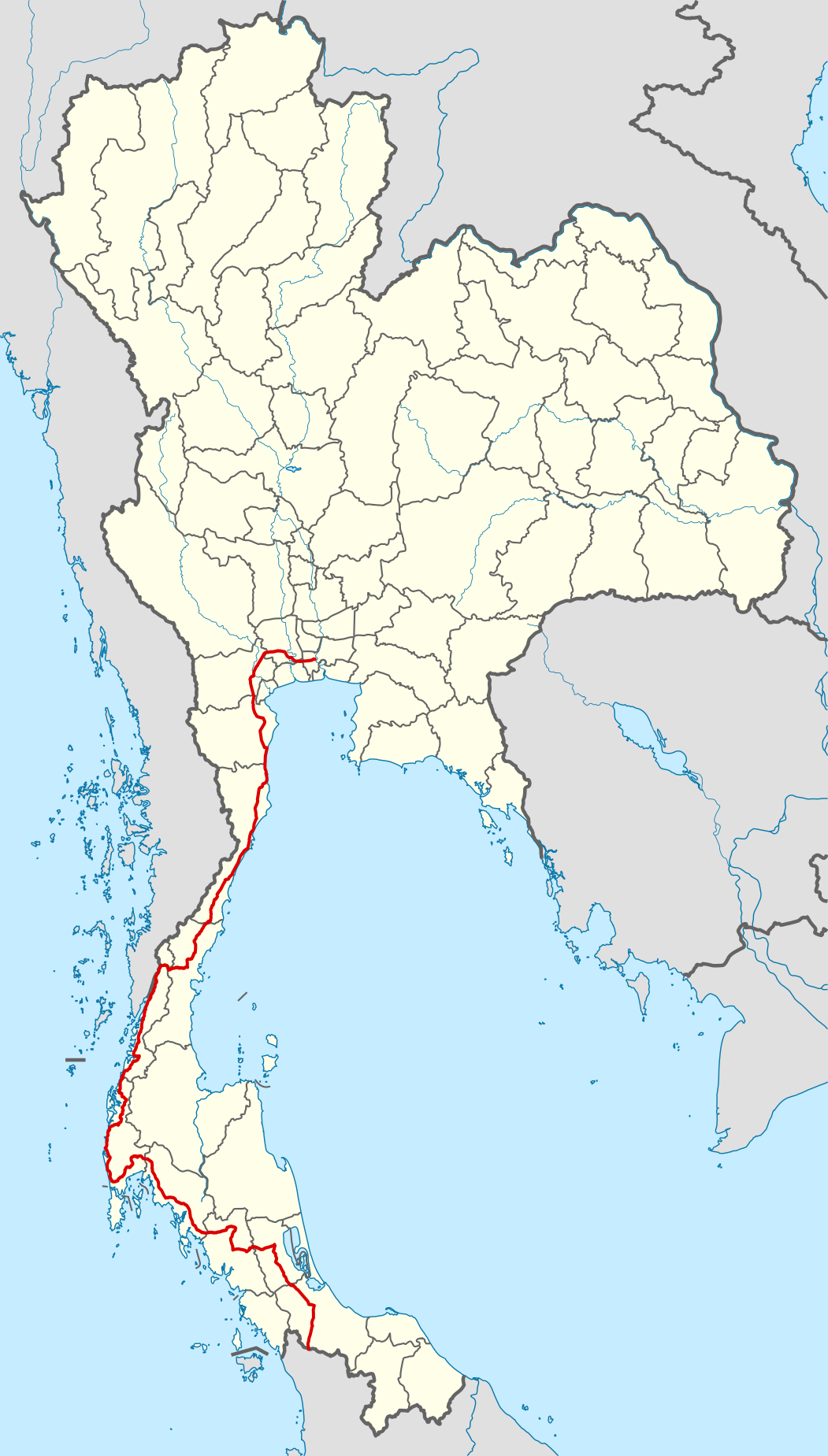

Route information
- Part of AH2 / AH123
- Existed: 1950–present

Major junctions
- North end: (Starting from Phetkasem Road) Naowa Chamnian Bridge in Bangkok Yai, Bangkok (Beginning of Highway 4) Phetkasem Road, km.26+420 in Om Yai, Sam Phran, Nakhon Pathom
- Motorway 9 / AH2; Motorway 91 (Planned); Hwy 338 / AH2 / AH123; Motorway 8 Hwy 375; Hwy 323 / AH123; Hwy 325 / Hwy 3090; Hwy 376 / AH2; Hwy 330 / Hwy 3238; Hwy 35; Hwy 37 / AH2; Hwy 326; Hwy 360; Hwy 41 / AH2; Hwy 327; Hwy 412; Hwy 401; Hwy 402; Hwy 415; Motorway 83 (Planned); Hwy 44; Hwy 403; Hwy 419; Hwy 4285; Hwy 406; Hwy 414; Hwy 43 / AH18; Hwy 407; Hwy 425 (Planned); Hwy 42; Motorway 84 (Planned); Hwy 4369
- South end: North–South Expressway Northern Route / FT 1 / AH2 in Sadao Checkpoint, Sadao, Songkhla

Location
- Country: Thailand
- Provinces: Bangkok, Samut Sakhon, Nakhon Pathom, Ratchaburi, Phetchaburi, Prachuap Khiri Khan, Chumphon, Ranong, Phang Nga, Krabi, Trang, Phatthalung, Songkhla
- Major cities: Bangkok, Nakhon Pathom, Prachuap Khiri Khan, Chumphon, Ranong, Phang Nga, Krabi, Trang, Phatthalung, Hat Yai, Sadao

Highway system
- Highways in Thailand; Motorways; Asian Highways

Phet Kasem Road (Thai: ถนนเพชรเกษม, RTGS: Thanon Phet Kasem, pronounced [tʰā.nǒn pʰét kā.sěːm]) or Highway 4 (Thai: ทางหลวงแผ่นดินหมายเลข 4, AH2) is one of the four primary highways in Thailand, along with Phahonyothin Road (Highway 1), Mittraphap Road (Highway 2), and Sukhumvit Road (Highway 3). At 1,310.554 km, route 4 is the longest highway in Thailand.

== History ==
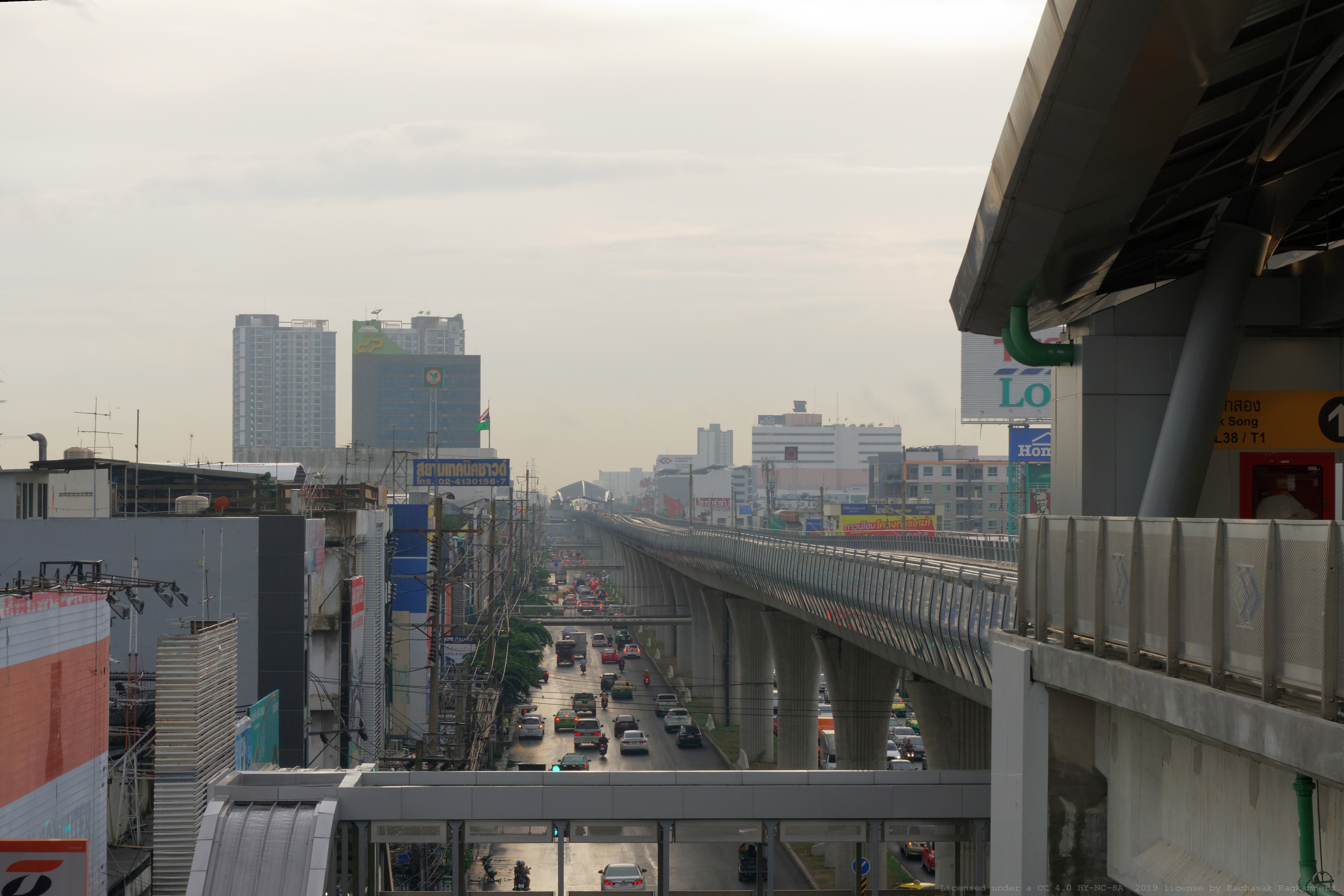
Bang Khae MRT station and Phet Kasem Road (outbound)

The construction of the road was finished in 1950 and was named "Phet Kasem" on December 10, 1950 in honour Luang Phet Kasemwithisawasdi (Tham Phetkasem), formerly the seventh director deputy general of the State Highways Department. Before that, it had been called "Bangkok–Khlong Phruan Road" (ถนนกรุงเทพ–คลองพรวน). Luang Phet Kasemwithisawasdi was the royal scholar of the State Railway Department (now State Railway of Thailand). He studied civil engineering in England and returned to work for the State Railway Department and then transferred to the State Highways Department. Phet Kasem Road was built during the period when Luang Phet Kasemwithisawasdi was the deputy director general of the State Highways Department. The road was named under the policy of the government of Major General Por Phibunsongkhram who named the road after the chief engineer who supervised the construction and gave the instructions.

== Route ==
Starts at Naowa Chamnian bridge, Bangkok Yai district and goes through the following districts of Bangkok : Phasi Charoen, Bang Khae and Nong Khaem.

The provinces along the road are Samut Sakhon, Nakhon Pathom, Ratchaburi, Phetchaburi, Prachuap Khiri Khan, Chumphon, Ranong, Phang Nga, Krabi, Trang, Phatthalung and Songkhla. It is linked to the North–South Expressway (NSE) of Malaysia at the Sadao-Bukit Kayu Hitam border.

Five sections of the highway are also the Asian Highway AH2 and a single section of highway are also the Asian Highway AH123.

- From Nakhon Chai Si to Ban Pong (Concurrent with AH123)
- From Ban Pong to Ratchaburi
- From Ratchaburi to Cha-am
- From Pranburi to Chumphon
- From Phatthalung to Malaysia border at Bukit Kayu Hitam, where it connects to the North–South Expressway (Malaysia) and Federal Route 1

== Rapid Transit ==
- The MRT Blue line runs on Phet Kasem Road between the lower platform of Tha Phra MRT station and Lak Song MRT station.

== Junction lists ==
Legend:

- I/C - Interchange, I/S - Intersection, RSA - Rest and service area, OBR - Overhead bridge restaurant, R/R - Restaurant and rest plaza, L/B - Layby, V/P - Vista point, TN - tunnel, T/P - Toll plaza, BR - Bridge
- C - Cloverleaf, S - Stack, T-A - Trumpet-A, T-B - Trumpet-B, DT - Directional-T/Y, SDT - Semi-Directional-T/Y, P-Y - Partial-Y, D - Diamond, P-C - Partial cloverleaf, D-D - Diverging diamond, D-R - Direct ramp

Province	District	km	Exit	Name	Destinations	Notes
Bangkok	Bangkok Yai		BR	Naowa Chamnian Bridge		Beginning of Phetkasem Road
Bangkok	Bang Khae				Motorway 9 / AH2	
Nakhon Pathom	Nakhon Chai Si				Motorway 91 (Planned)	
Nakhon Pathom	Nakhon Chai Si				Hwy 338 / AH2 / AH123	
Nakhon Pathom	Nakhon Chai Si				Motorway 8	
Nakhon Pathom	Mueang Nakhon Pathom				Hwy 375	
Ratchaburi	Ban Pong				Hwy 323 / AH123	
Ratchaburi	Bang Phae				Hwy 325 / Hwy 3090	
Ratchaburi	Mueang Ratchaburi				Hwy 376 / AH2	
Ratchaburi	Mueang Ratchaburi				Hwy 330 / Hwy 3238	
Ratchaburi	Mueang Ratchaburi				Hwy 376 / AH2	
Ratchaburi	Pak Tho				Hwy 35	
Phetchaburi	Thayang				Motorway 8	
Phetchaburi	Cha-am				Hwy 37 / AH2	
Prachuap Khiri Khan	Pranburi				Hwy 37 / AH2	
Prachuap Khiri Khan	Mueang Prachuap Khiri Khan				Hwy 326	
Chumphon	Thasae				Hwy 360	
Chumphon	Mueang Chumphon				Hwy 41 / AH2; Hwy 327	
Ranong	Mueang Ranong				Hwy 412	
Phang Nga	Takua Pa				Hwy 401	
Phang Nga	Takua Thung				Hwy 402	
Krabi	Ao Luek				Hwy 415	
Krabi	Ao Luek				Motorway 83 (Planned); Hwy 44	
Trang	Huai Yot				Hwy 403	
Trang	Mueang Trang				Hwy 419	
Trang	Mueang Trang				Hwy 403	
Trang	Mueang Trang				Hwy 419	
Phatthalung	Mueang Phatthalung				Hwy 41 / AH2; Hwy 4285	
Songkhla	Rattaphum				Hwy 406	
Songkhla	Bang Klam				Hwy 414	
Songkhla	Hat Yai				Motorway 8 (Planned); Hwy 43 / AH18; Hwy 407	
Songkhla	Hat Yai				Hwy 425 (Planned)	
Songkhla	Sadao				Hwy 42	
Songkhla	Sadao				Motorway 84 (Planned); Hwy 4369	
Songkhla	Sadao			Sadao Checkpoint		
Malaysia–Thailand border Through to North–South Expressway Northern Route / FT 1 / AH2

== See also ==
- Thai highway network
