= Mueang Surat Thani district =

Mueang Surat Thani เมืองสุราษฎร์ธานี
- District
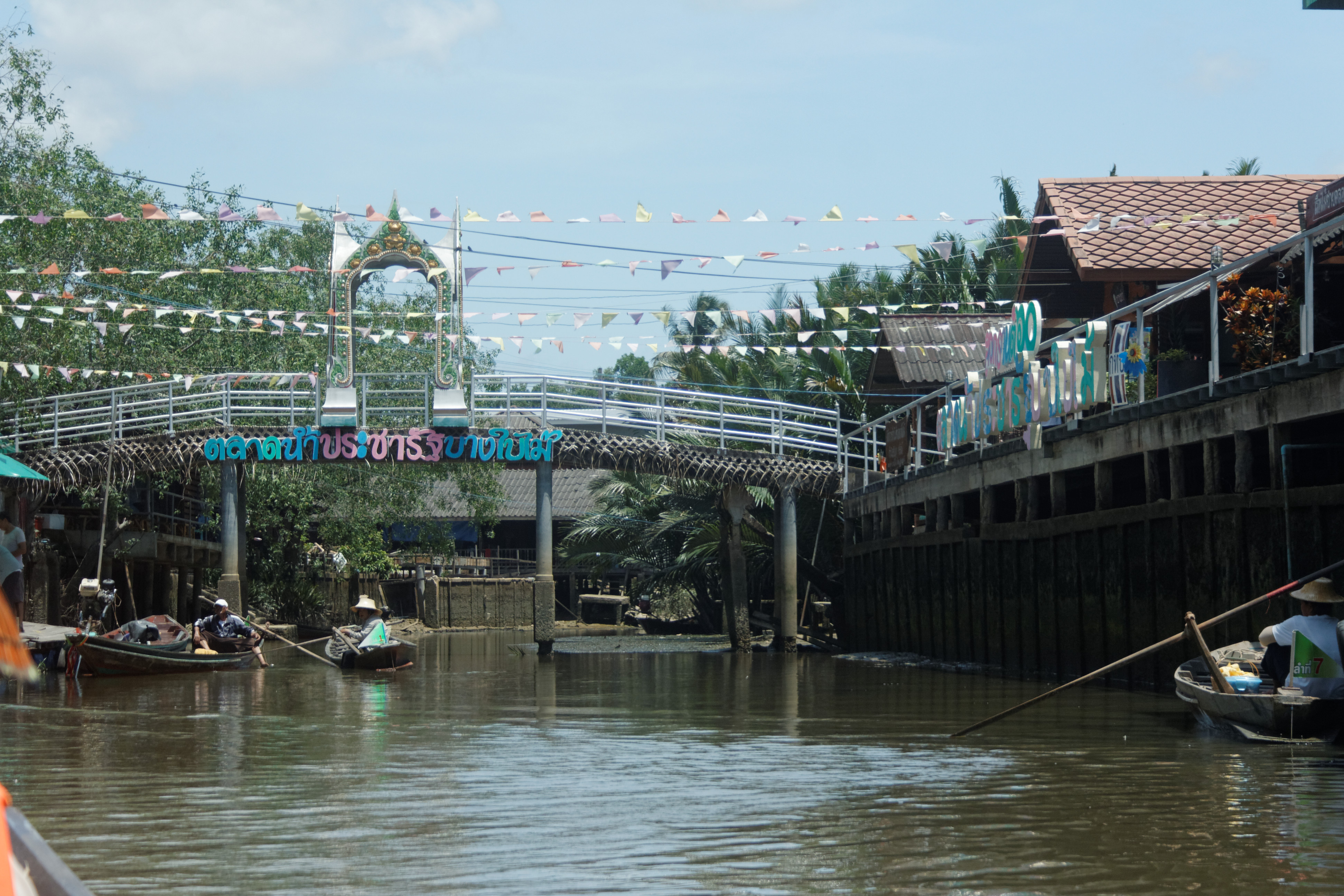
- Pracharat Bang Bai Mai Floating Market, Bang Bai Mai

- District location in Surat Thani province
- Coordinates: 9°8′11″N 99°19′13″E
- Country: Thailand
- Province: Surat Thani
- Seat: Talat

Area
  - Total: 233.8 km^{2} (90.3 sq mi)

Population (2012)
  - Total: 172,202
  - Density: 713.8/km^{2} (1,849/sq mi)
- Time zone: UTC+7 (ICT)
- Postal code: 84000, 84100
- TIS 1099: 8401

Mueang Surat Thani (Thai: เมืองสุราษฎร์ธานี, pronounced [mɯ̄a̯ŋ sù.râːt tʰāː.nīː]), or colloquially Ban Don District (Thai/Southern Thai: บ้านดอน), is the district of Surat Thani province in southern Thailand.

== Geography ==
The district is at the mouth of the Tapi River, where it flows into Bandon Bay of the Gulf of Thailand. Neighboring districts are (from the east clockwise): Kanchanadit, Ban Na San, Ban Na Doem, and Phunphin district.

To the east of the district, the Thathong River marks the natural boundary to Kanchanadit, while the western arm of the Tapi River partially marks the boundary to Phunphin. Khun Thale is a small lake in the center of the district. The Khao Tha Phet non-hunting area protects 4.65 km^{2} of a hill south of the city of Surat Thani.

The Khun Thale swamp to the south of the district is the source of two short minor rivers which meander through the city, Khlong Makham Tia and Khlong Tha Kup.

== History ==
The Ban Don district was formed when in 1897 Mueang Chaiya and Kanchanadit were merged into a single province named Chaiya, with its administrative center at Chaiya. Until 1912, administrative center was move to Bandon, then change named Mueang. In 1915 the province was renamed Surat Thani. In 1917 the district was renamed Ban Don (บ้านดอน). In 1938 the district was renamed Mueang Surat Thani, when all capital districts were named after their corresponding province.

Mueang Surat Thani or Ban Don before World War II period was the location of many businesses lined along the Tapi River, such as sawmills, trade offices, office of East Asiatic Company, including water bus services, which was often called Ruea Naris (เรือนริศ) and the residence of Prince Naris as well.

Before King Rama V's reign, Ban Don was also the centre of shipbuilding as well. There were skilled shipbuilders in both domestic and neighbouring districts, such as Thathong, Chaiya. They can build ships, both warships and royal barges.

Although the capital district (Amphoe mueang) of Surat Thani province is Bandon district, the local Surat Thani people generally refer to the capital district as Chaiya district and refer to Bandon district as little China of the province.

== Demographics ==
Though the primary language of Surat Thani Province is the Southern Thai, Bandon district is an ethnic enclave which is locally dominated by Hoklo from Penang and Teochews from Bangkok, who mostly migrated after the Anglo-Siamese Treaty of 1909, this include language purge in 1930s-80s. It is therefore the sole district in the province where the Bandon dialect (Central Thai) is the primary native language, rather than Southern Thai. Since vast amount of Southern Thais from capital district (Chaiya) migrate to Bandon in 1980s, most of the locals also use Southern Thai as a passive bilingual.

== Administration ==
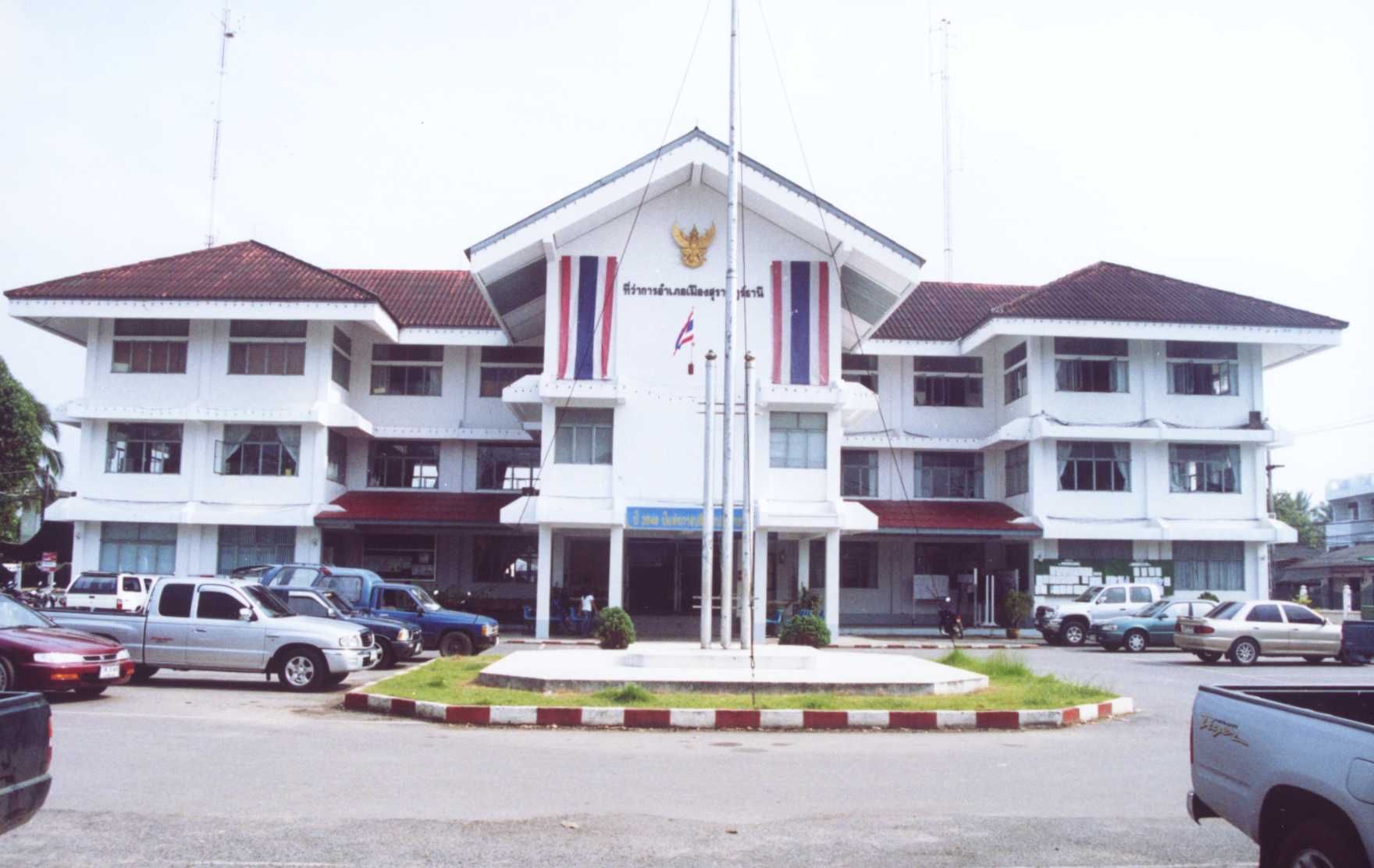
District office, Mueang Surat Thani

The district is divided into 11 sub-districts (tambons), which are further subdivided into 70 villages (mubans). Surat Thani itself is a city (thesaban nakhon) and covers tambons Talat and Bang Kung, and parts of the tambons Khlong Chanak, Bang Chana, Bang Bai Mai, and Makham Tia. Wat Pradu and Khun Thale have sub-district municipality (thesaban tambon) status, and cover the same-named sub-district. There are a further eight tambon administrative organizations (TAO), for each sub-district except the three completely covered by municipalities.

No.	Name	Thai	Villages	Pop.
1.	Talat	ตลาด	-	29,112
2.	Makham Tia	มะขามเตี้ย	8	70,974
3.	Wat Pradu	วัดประดู่	10	14,675
4.	Khun Thale	ขุนทะเล	10	12,634
5.	Bang Bai Mai	บางใบไม้	5	3,172
6.	Bang Chana	บางชนะ	6	3,128
7.	Khlong Noi	คลองน้อย	9	3,645
8.	Bang Sai	บางไทร	4	1,873
9.	Bang Pho	บางโพธิ์	5	1,837
10.	Bang Kung	บางกุ้ง	5	26,944
11.	Khlong Chanak	คลองฉนาก	8	4,208

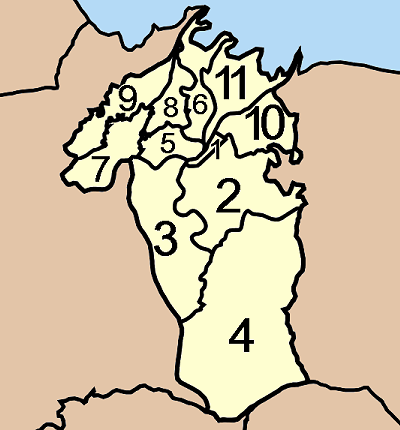
