= Ban Na San district =

Ban Na San บ้านนาสาร
- District
- District location in Surat Thani province
- Coordinates: 8°48′2″N 99°21′51″E
- Country: Thailand
- Province: Surat Thani
- Seat: Na San

Area
  - Total: 839.3 km^{2} (324.1 sq mi)

Population (2005)
  - Total: 68,345
  - Density: 81.4/km^{2} (211/sq mi)
- Time zone: UTC+7 (ICT)
- Postal code: 84120
- Geocode: 8412

Ban Na San (Thai: บ้านนาสาร, pronounced [bâːn nāː sǎːn]) is a district (amphoe) of Surat Thani province, Thailand.

== Geography ==
Neighboring districts are (from the east clockwise): Nopphitam and Phipun of Nakhon Si Thammarat province; Wiang Sa, Khian Sa, Ban Na Doem, Mueang Surat Thani, and Kanchanadit of Surat Thani.

The eastern portion of the district is within the Nakhon Si Thammarat mountain range and is part of Tai Rom Yen National Park.

== History ==
The district dates back to the Lamphun District, once responsible for all of the southeastern part of the present-day province. Originally the district was divided into seven tambons: Ban Na, Tha Ruea, Kobkaeb, Thung Tao, I-Pan, Prasaeng, and Phanom. In 1899 the southern part was split off as Prasaeng District and Phanom minor district.

Originally the district was administered from Nakhon Si Thammarat, and was transferred to Chaiya (now Surat Thani) in 1906.

On 29 April 1918 the district was renamed Ban Na, the site of the district office. On 1 July 1938 the district office was moved to Na San and the district was renamed Ban Na San on 20 April 1939. In the 1970s the district was reduced in size when the districts of Khian Sa, Wiang Sa, and Ban Na Doem were split off.

Thailand's first rambutan trees were planted in Ban Na San in 1926 by the Chinese Malay K. Vong. An annual rambutan fair is held during August's harvest time.

== Administration ==
Ban Na San is divided into 11 sub-districts (tambons), which are further subdivided into 65 villages (mubans). There is one town (thesaban mueang) Na San, which covers tambon Na San. Each tambon except Na San has a tambon administrative organization (TAO).

No.	Name	Thai name	Villages	Pop.
1.	Na San	นาสาร	-	19,752
2.	Phru Phi	พรุพี	7	5,470
3.	Thung Tao	ทุ่งเตา	5	4,080
4.	Lamphun	ลำพูน	7	5,879
5.	Tha Chi	ท่าชี	6	4,444
6.	Khuan Si	ควนศรี	8	4,810
7.	Khuan Suban	ควนสุบรรณ	7	5,206
8.	Khlong Prap	คลองปราบ	5	3,877
9.	Nam Phu	น้ำพุ	6	5,308
10.	Thung Tao Mai	ทุ่งเตาใหม่	8	5,974
11.	Phoem Phun Sap	เพิ่มพูนทรัพย์	6	3,545

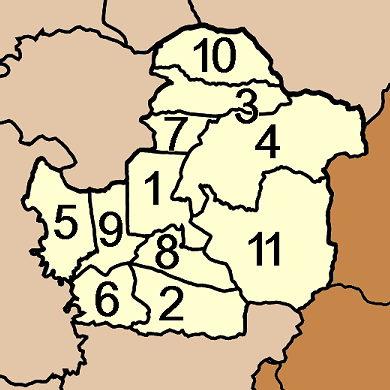
