= Tha Sala district =

District of Thailand

Tha Sala ท่าศาลา
- District
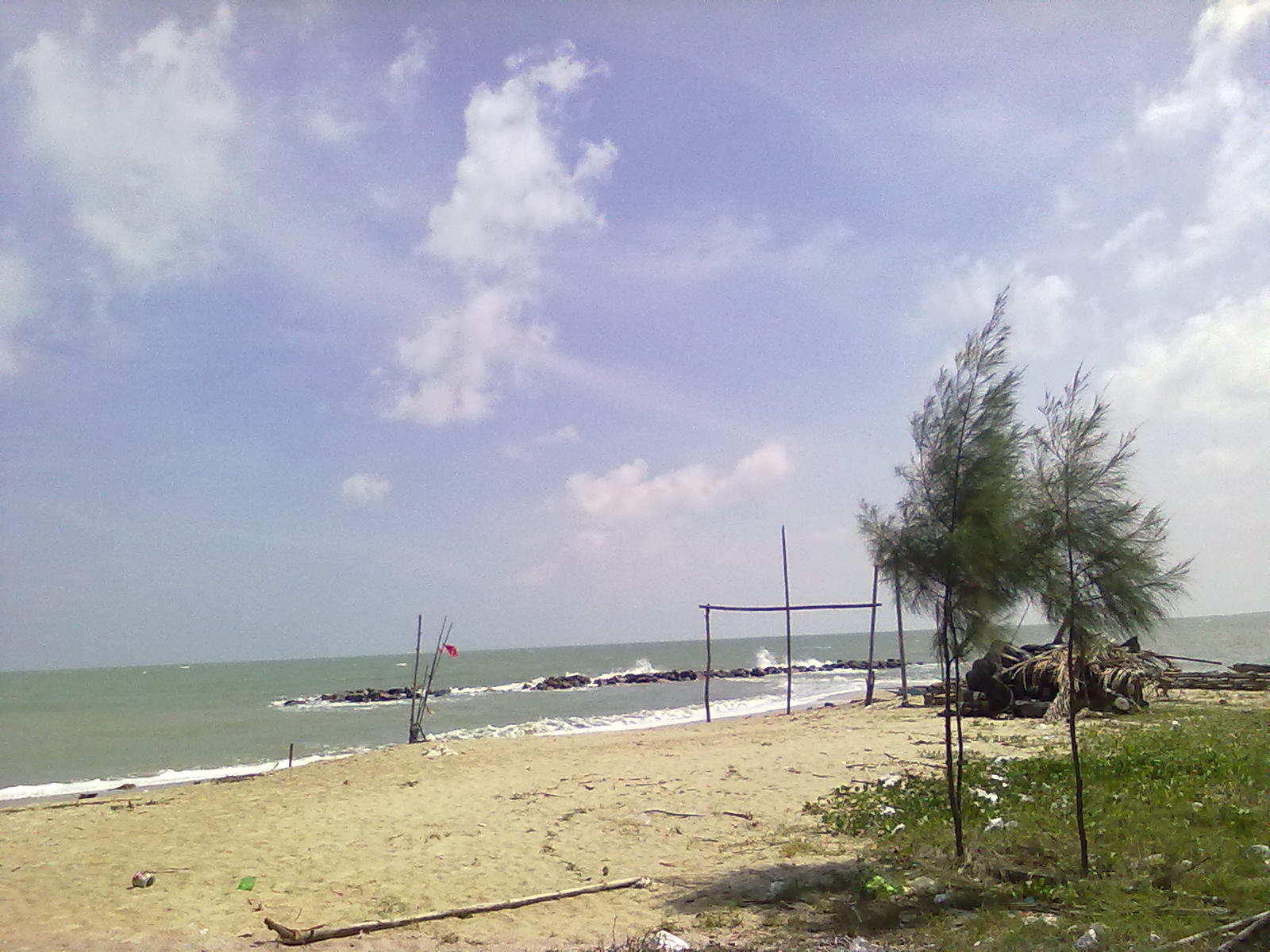
- Beach near Tha Sala town

- District location in Nakhon Si Thammarat province
- Coordinates: 8°40′0″N 99°55′54″E
- Country: Thailand
- Province: Nakhon Si Thammarat
- Seat: Tha Sala
- Subdistricts: 10
- Mubans: 110

Area
  - Total: 363.891 km^{2} (140.499 sq mi)

Population (2021)
  - Total: 117,851
  - Density: 293.9/km^{2} (761/sq mi)
- Time zone: UTC+7 (ICT)
- Postal code: 80160
- Geocode: 8008

Tha Sala (Thai: ท่าศาลา, pronounced [tʰâː sǎː.lāː]) is a district (amphoe) of Nakhon Si Thammarat province, southern Thailand.

== Geography ==
Neighboring districts are (from the south clockwise): Mueang Nakhon Si Thammarat, Phrom Khiri, Nopphitam, and Sichon. To the east is the Gulf of Thailand.

== History ==
During the thesaphiban administrative reforms five mueang of the Nakhon Si Thammarat Kingdom were put together to form Nakhon Si Thammarat Province. These mueang were Thai Buri, Ron Ka Ro, Klai, Mo Khlan, and Noppitham. At its establishment in 1897 the district was named Klai (กลาย) and divided into the 10 tambons Tha Sala, Tha Khuen, Sa Kaeo, Klai, Thaiburi, Karo, Nopphitam, Hua Taphan, Mokkhalan, and Don Tako. The first district officer was Charoen (Mai Sap Nam Sakun), the district office was at the coast in Ban Paknam Thasung. In 1916 the district office was moved to tambon Tha Sala and the district was renamed accordingly.

The western part of the district was split off to form the new minor district Nopphitam in 1995.

== Administration ==
=== Central administration ===
Tha Sala is divided into 10 sub-districts (tambons), which are further subdivided into 110 administrative villages (mubans).

| No. | Name | Thai | Villages | Pop. |
|---|---|---|---|---|
| 1. | Tha Sala | ท่าศาลา | 15 | 32,723 |
| 2. | Klai | กลาย | 12 | 8,647 |
| 3. | Tha Khuen | ท่าขึ้น | 15 | 13,670 |
| 4. | Hua Taphan | หัวตะพาน | 9 | 4,973 |
| 6. | Sa Kaeo | สระแก้ว | 11 | 9,007 |
| 7. | Mokkhalan | โมคลาน | 15 | 14,107 |
| 9. | Thai Buri | ไทยบุรี | 10 | 7,012 |
| 10. | Don Tako | ดอนตะโก | 6 | 5,037 |
| 11. | Taling Chan | ตลิ่งชัน | 9 | 8,541 |
| 13. | Pho Thong | โพธิ์ทอง | 8 | 8,848 |

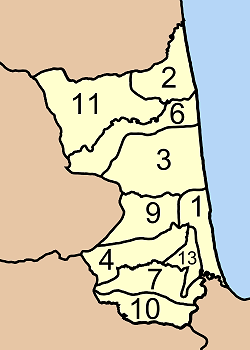

Missing numbers are now part of Nopphitam District.

=== Local administration ===
There are two town municipality (thesaban mueang) in the district:

- Tha Sala (Thai: เทศบาลเมืองท่าศาลา) consisting of parts of sub-district Tha Sala.
- Tha Khuen (Thai: เทศบาลเมืองท่าขึ้น) consisting of sub-district Tha Khuen.

There is one sub-district municipality (thesaban tambon) in the district:

- Tha Sala (Thai: เทศบาลตำบลท่าศาลา) consisting of parts of sub-district Tha Sala.

There are 8 sub-district administrative organizations (SAO) in the district:

- Klai (Thai: องค์การบริหารส่วนตำบลกลาย) consisting of sub-district Klai.
- Hua Taphan (Thai: องค์การบริหารส่วนตำบลหัวตะพาน) consisting of sub-district Hua Taphan.
- Sa Kaeo (Thai: องค์การบริหารส่วนตำบลสระแก้ว) consisting of sub-district Sa Kaeo.
- Mokkhalan (Thai: องค์การบริหารส่วนตำบลโมคลาน) consisting of sub-district Mokkhalan.
- Thai Buri (Thai: องค์การบริหารส่วนตำบลไทยบุรี) consisting of sub-district Thai Buri.
- Don Tako (Thai: องค์การบริหารส่วนตำบลดอนตะโก) consisting of sub-district Don Tako.
- Taling Chan (Thai: องค์การบริหารส่วนตำบลตลิ่งชัน) consisting of sub-district Taling Chan.
- Pho Thong (Thai: องค์การบริหารส่วนตำบลโพธิ์ทอง) consisting of sub-district Pho Thong.
