= Ban Na Doem district =

Ban Na Doem บ้านนาเดิม
- District
- District location in Surat Thani province
- Coordinates: 8°53′05″N 99°16′35″E
- Country: Thailand
- Province: Surat Thani
- Seat: Ban Na

Area
  - Total: 207.3 km^{2} (80.0 sq mi)

Population (2005)
  - Total: 21,797
  - Density: 105.1/km^{2} (272/sq mi)
- Time zone: UTC+7 (ICT)
- Postal code: 84240
- Geocode: 8413

Ban Na Doem (Thai: บ้านนาเดิม, pronounced [bâːn nāː dɤ̄ːm]) is a district (amphoe) of Surat Thani province, Thailand.

== Geography ==
Ban Na Doem is in the center of Surat Thani Province. Neighboring districts are (from the north clockwise): Mueang Surat Thani, Ban Na San, Khian Sa, and Phunphin.

The Tapi River forms part of the western boundary of the district. A smaller river in the district is the Khlong Lamphun.

== History ==
Lamphun District, one of the original districts of Surat Thani Province, was administered from the town of Ban Na, which is now the center of the Ban Na Doem District. On 1 July 1938, however, the district office was moved to Na San and the district was renamed Ban Na San one year later.

Effective 25 April 1976 the area around Ban Na was split off from Ban Na San District and formed a new minor district (king amphoe). The minor district was originally divided into two tambons, Ban Na and Tha Ruea. On 15 August 1982 the tambon Sap Thawi was split from off Tha Ruea, and on 1 July 1983, Na Tai from Ban Na.

On 21 May 1990 the minor district was elevated to full district status.

== Administration ==
Ban Na Doem is divided into four sub-districts (tambons), which are further subdivided into 30 villages (mubans). There is one township (thesaban tambon), Ban Na, covering parts of tambons Ban Na and Na Tai. Each tambon has a tambon administrative organization (TAO), responsible for areas not covered by the township.

No.	Name	Thai name	Villages	Pop.
1.	Ban Na	บ้านนา	10	9,258
2.	Tha Ruea	ท่าเรือ	6	3,253
3.	Sap Thawi	ทรัพย์ทวี	5	3,473
4.	Na Tai	นาใต้	9	5,813

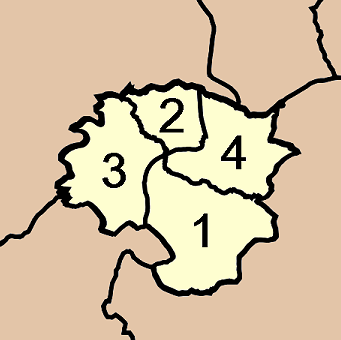
