= Bandon Bay =

Coordinates: 9°17′N 99°17′E

Gulf of Thailand with Bandon Bay in the west.

Bandon Bay (Thai: อ่าวบ้านดอน, RTGS: Ao Ban Don, Thai pronunciation: [ʔàːw bâːn dɔːn]) is a bay in the Gulf of Thailand in Surat Thani Province, extending from the Sui cape in Chaiya District in the northwest to Kanchanadit District to the east. The total coastline is about 100 km. The bay is dominated by the estuary of the rivers Tapi and Phum Duang. The islands of Ko Samui, Ko Pha Ngan and Ko Tao enclose the bay on its eastern side.

The bay is relatively shallow, with water depths ranging from one to five meters. Along the coast are mudflats owing to the high rate of sedimentation, which were naturally overgrown with mangroves (Sonneratia spp., Rhizophora spp.), but now mostly replaced by shrimp farms.
