= Nakhon Si Thammarat Range =

Mountain range on the Malay Peninsula in southern Thailand

- Banthat Range
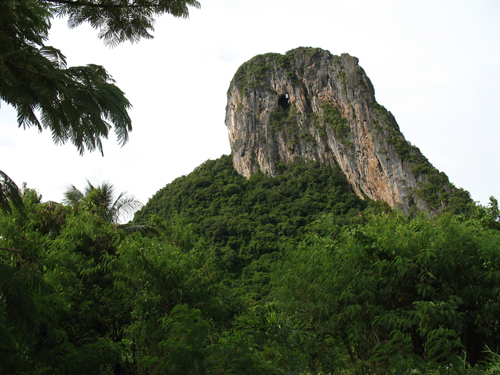
- Khao Ok Thalu, Phatthalung is part of the Nakhon Si Thammarat Range

Highest point
- Peak: Khao Luang
- Elevation: 1,835 m (6,020 ft)
- Coordinates: 8°30′N 99°34′E

Dimensions
- Length: 230 km (140 mi) N/S
- Width: 45 km (28 mi) E/W

Geography
- Country: Thailand
- Range coordinates: 8°25′20″N 99°43′52″E
- Parent range: Tenasserim Hills

Geology
- Rock age(s): Permian, Triassic
- Rock type(s): Limestone, granite

The Nakhon Si Thammarat Range (Thai: ทิวเขานครศรีธรรมราช, RTGS: Thio Khao Nakhon Si Thammarat, [tʰīw kʰǎw ná(ʔ).kʰɔ̄ːn sǐː tʰām.mā.râːt]) is a mountain range on the Malay Peninsula in southern Thailand, running in a north–south direction. This mountain chain is also sometimes named Banthat Range (ทิวเขาบรรทัด), a name which is however also used to refer to the Chanthaburi Mountains.

== Location ==
The main range of the peninsula begins along the east coast at about 10° 05′ north latitude on Ko Tao. It continues through Ko Pha-ngan and Ko Samui to the east coast mainland, east of Bandon Bay, and parallels the coast all the way into Malayan territory.

== Description ==
The mountains are named after the town Nakhon Si Thammarat, located east of the range. The highest elevation is the 1835 m high Khao Luang. This mountain range is a part of the Tenasserim Hills system. It begins to the east of the Phuket Range, which runs in the same direction about 60 km further west. Between the ranges there are isolated peaks, the highest of which is 1,350 m high Khao Phanom Bencha. To the south it is continued by the Sankalakhiri Range.

Several smaller rivers originate in the mountain range, the Tapi River is the largest by far. Another relatively large river is the Trang River.

The range is in the Tenasserim–South Thailand semi-evergreen rain forests ecoregion.

== Protected areas ==
Several national parks are located in the mountain range.

- Tai Romyen National Park
- Khao Luang National Park
- Khao Nan National Park
- Namtok Yong National Park
- Khao Pu–Khao Ya National_Park
