= Tapi River (Thailand) =

Coordinates: 9°11′50″N 99°22′57″E

Tapi Tapee
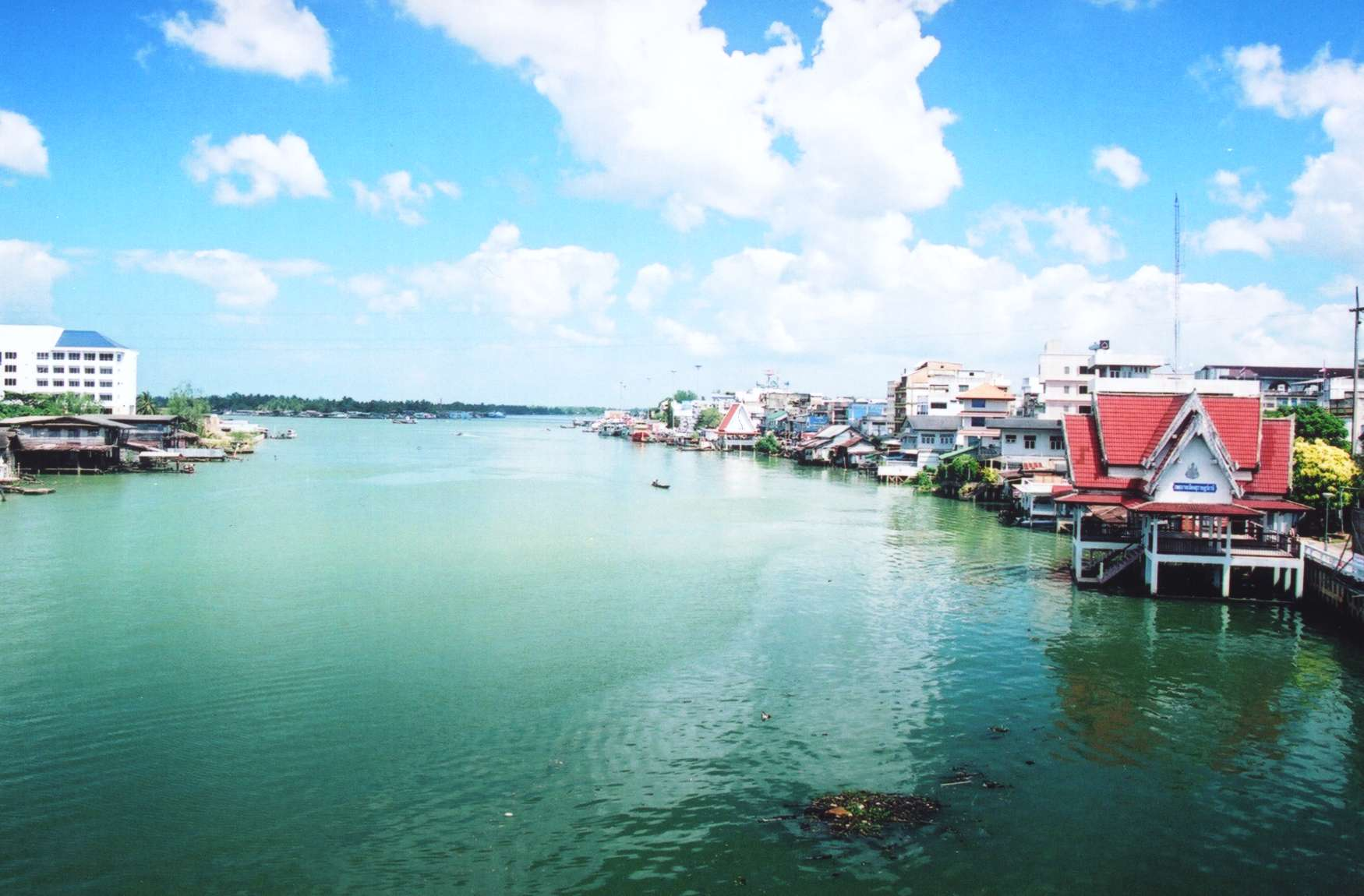
- Native name: แม่น้ำตาปี (Thai)

Location
- Country: Thailand
- Province: Surat Thani

Physical characteristics
- Source: Khao Luang, Nakhon Si Thammarat
- Mouth: Bandon Bay, Bandon, Surat Thani

The Tapi (or Tapee) river (Thai: แม่น้ำตาปี, RTGS: Maenam Tapi, Thai pronunciation: [mɛ̂ːnáːm tāːpīː]) is the longest river in southern Thailand. The river originates at Khao Luang mountain in Nakhon Si Thammarat Province, and empties into the Gulf of Thailand at Bandon Bay near the town of Bandon. It has a length of 230 kilometres (140 mi).

The river drains an area of 5,460 square kilometres (2,110 mi^{2}) and in 1997 had a yearly discharge of 135.4 cubic metres per second (4,780 cu ft/s) or 4.3 cubic kilometres (3,500,000 acre⋅ft) per year. The Phum Duang River (or Khiri Rat River), which drains another 6,125 square kilometres (2,365 mi^{2}) west of the Tapi watershed, joins the estuary 15 kilometres (9 mi) west of Surat Thani in the Phunphin district.

The river was named on 29 July 1915, after the river Tapi in Surat, India, shortly after the town of Surat Thani was named after the town of Surat in Gujarat, India.

The island of Ko Lamphu (เกาะลำพู) is in the Tapi River, about 9 kilometres (6 mi) from its mouth, near Surat Thani town center.

In 1975, an area of 29.6 square kilometres (11.4 mi^{2}) of swamp land on the east bank of the river in the Khian Sa District was declared the Nong Thung Thong non-hunting area.
