= Mu Ko Lanta National Park =

Marine protected area in the southern part of Krabi Province, Thailand

- อุทยานแห่งชาติหมู่เกาะลันตา
- IUCN category II (national park)
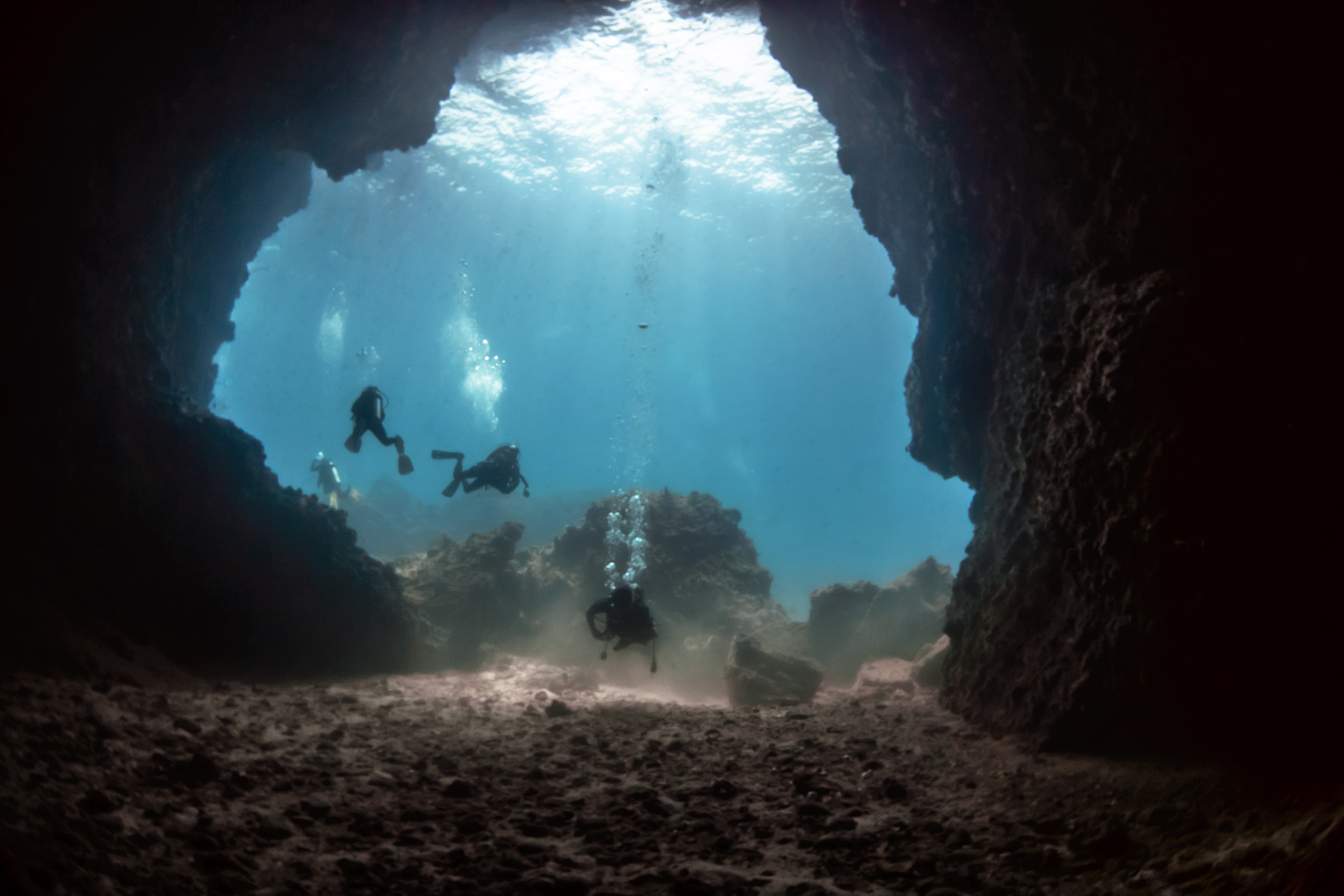
- Underwater cave in the park
- Interactive map of Mu Ko Lanta National Park
- Location: Krabi Province, Thailand
- Nearest city: Krabi
- Coordinates: 7°29′02″N 99°05′56″E
- Area: 134 km^{2} (52 sq mi)
- Established: 15 August 1990
- Visitors: 217,431 (in 2019)
- Governing body: Department of National Park, Wildlife and Plant Conservation (DNP)

Mu Ko Lanta National Park (Thai: อุทยานแห่งชาติหมู่เกาะลันตา) is a national park in the southern part of Krabi Province, Thailand, consisting of several islands. The two largest islands are Ko Lanta Noi and Ko Lanta Yai. Although both are inhabited, Ko Lanta Yai is the primary tourist destination. The park was established on 15 August 1990

A clan of Chao Ley, or "sea gypsies" lives on Ko Lanta Yai. The clan still practices many of their ancient customs and ceremonies, such as the setting of ceremonial boats adrift to bring good luck and prosperity on the full moon nights of the sixth and eleventh months.

== Toponymy ==
Ko Lanta was once known by its Malay name, "Pulao Satak", which means "Long Beach Island". Later, many Thais, both Buddhist and Muslim, moved to the island making the island known as the island of "a million eyes" ("lan ta" in Thai). The name may also be derived from the Javanese "lan-tas", or fish grill (built of wood with a square grill on top where the fish are placed in a circle).

== Topography ==
The area of Mu Ko Lanta National Park is 83,750 rai ~ 134 square kilometres (52 sq mi). It includes Mu Ko Rok, Ko Mai Ngam, Ko Talabeng, parts of Ko Lanta Yai, Ko Ngai, Mu Ko Rokk, Ko Rok Nai, Mu Ko Maa, Ko Hin Dang and the nearby islands of Ko Klang, Ko Lanta Noi, and Ko Lanta Yai sub-district, Amphoe Ko Lanta, Krabi Province.

The terrain is mountainous, especially near the southern tip. Plains are found only in beach areas in the southern portion of the park. Most areas have more than a 35 degree slope, except only the middle part of island where the slope is more than 50 degrees. Elevations range from sea level to 488 meters at the tallest peak.

== Climate ==
Highest rainfall is in September, 391.4 mm, and lowest in January at 6.5 mm. September has the most rainy days with 21.6 days and February the fewest, about 1.6 days. During the rainy season, 16 May-31 October, some smaller islands are closed to visitors.

== Fauna ==
The animals that live on the islands are divided into six categories.

1. Mammals: bats (deer, tigers and barking deer used to live on the islands).

2. Birds: brahminy kite, bridled tern, and emerald dove.

3. Reptiles: asian water monitor, reticulated python, and cobras.

4. Amphibians: giant mountain frogs, ornate froglets, and common tree frog.

5. Freshwater fish and marine fish: blue danio fish, coral reef fish, and lizard fish.

6. Coral reef animals: staghorn coral, Fungia fungites, and anemone coral.

== Flora ==
The plants in Mu Ko Lanta National Park can be categorized into three groups.

1. Rainforest: The total area of rainforest at Mu Ko Lanta Yai is about 19.42 km^{2}. The average height of trees is 15–25 meters. The important plants are Hopea ferrea, Dipterocarpus turbinatus and Lagerstroemia floribunda.

2. Mangrove forest: On Ko Ngu, Ko Mai Ngam, and Ko Mai Ngam Tai. The average height of trees is five meters. There are many plants in the mangrove forest, such as Avicennia alba, Rhizophora apiculata, and Rhizophora mucronata.

3. Beach forest: Found on Ko Ngai between the beach and rainforest. Significant plants are bengal almond, Millettia pinnata, and beach morning glory.

== Gallery ==
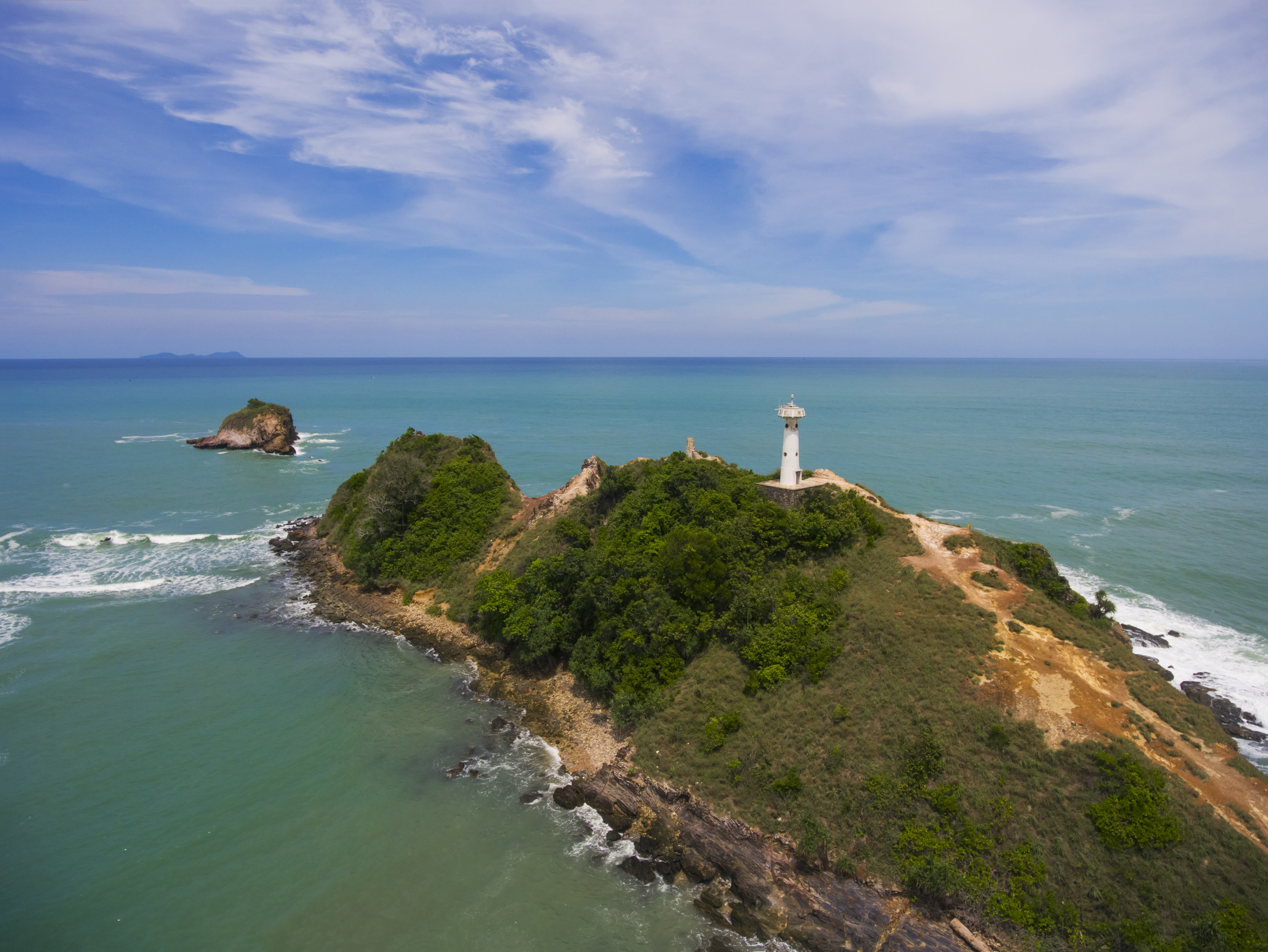
Southern cape of Ko Lanta Yai

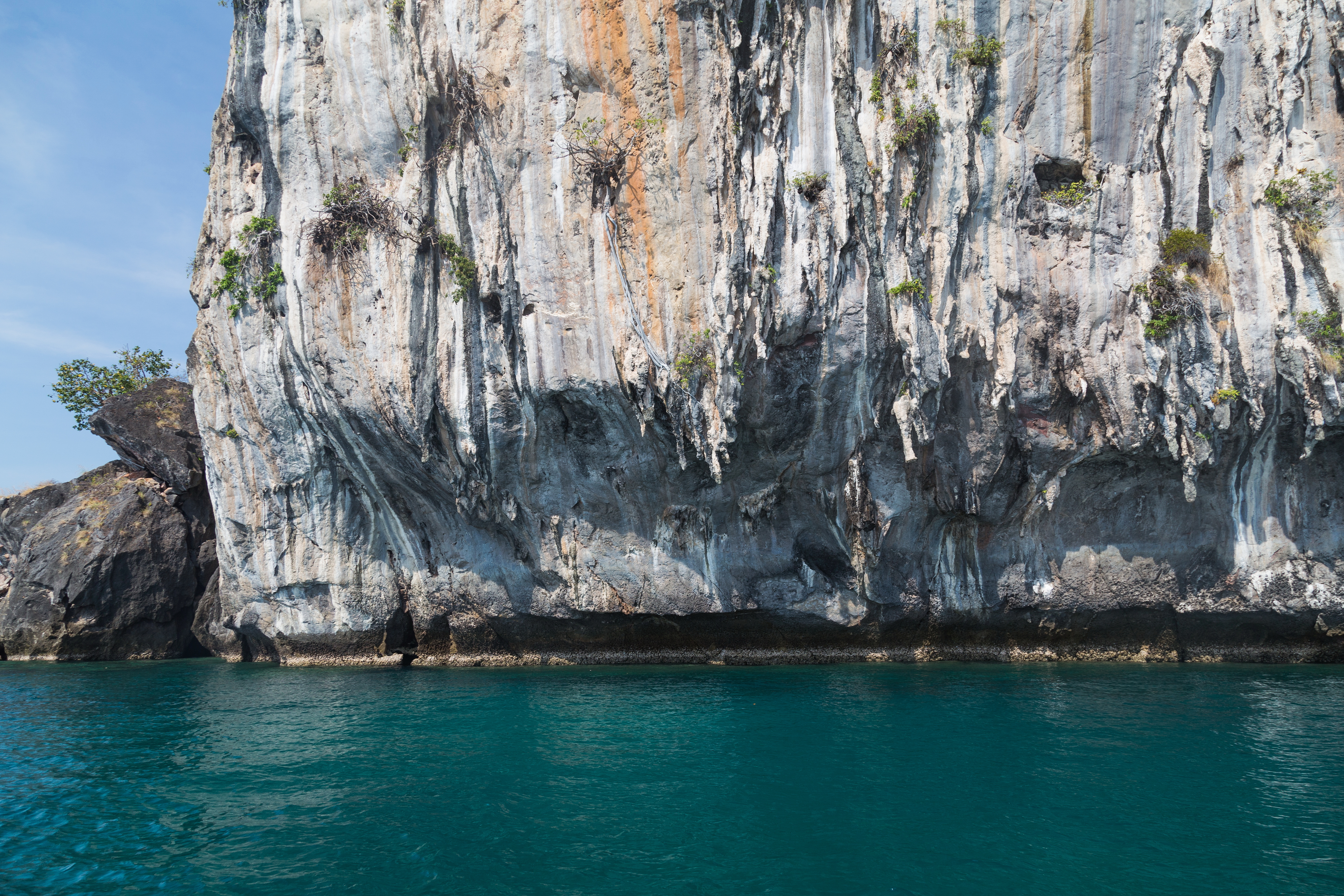
Ko Ma

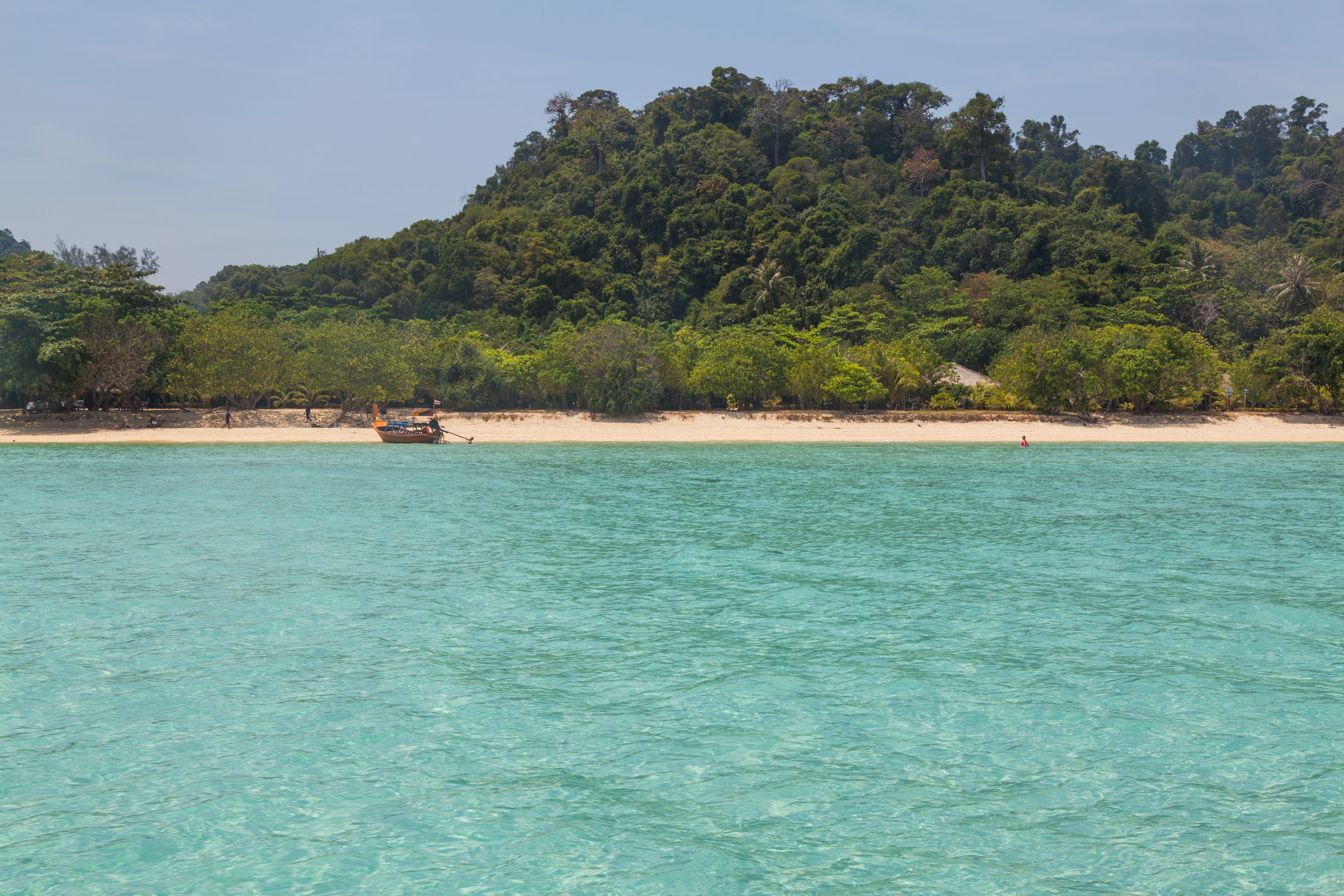
Ko Ngai

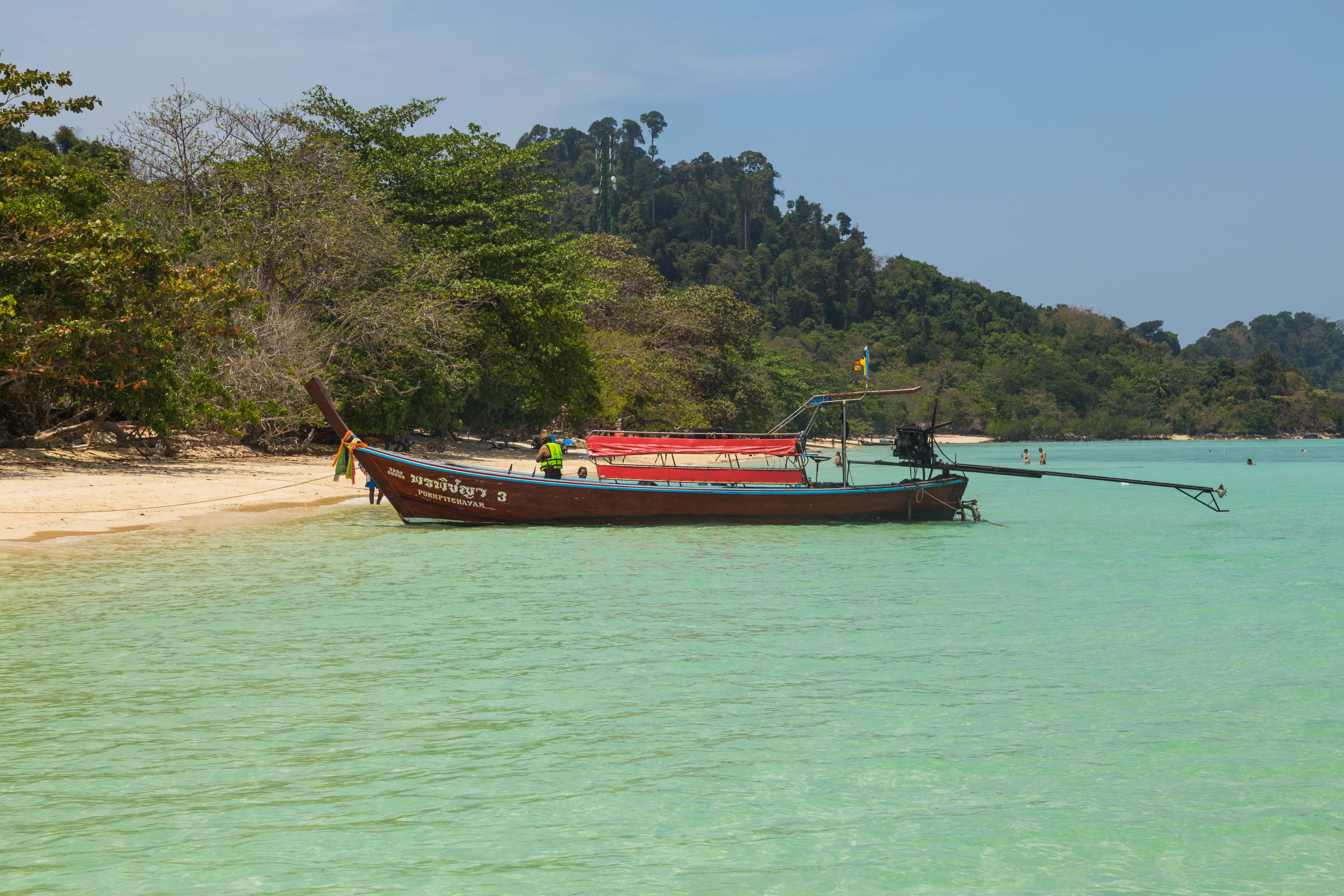
Long-tail boat at Ko Ngai

== Location ==
Mu Ko Lanta National Park in overview PARO 5 (Nakhon Si Thammarat)

10) Mu Ko Lanta National Park in overview PARO 5

	National park
1	Ao Phang Nga
2	Hat Chao Mai
3	Hat Khanom-Mu Ko Thale Tai
4	Hat Noppharat Thara– Mu Ko Phi Phi
5	Khao Lak-Lam Ru
6	Khao Lampi-Hat Thai Mueang
7	Khao Luang
8	Khao Nan
9	Khao Phanom Bencha
10	Mu Ko Lanta
11	Mu Ko Phetra
12	Mu Ko Similan
13	Mu Ko Surin
14	Namtok Si Khit
15	Namtok Yong
16	Si Phang Nga
17	Sirinat
18	Tarutao
19	Thale Ban
20	Than Bok Khorani

	Wildlife sanctuary
21	Kathun
22	Khao Pra–Bang Khram
23	Khlong Phraya
24	Namtok Song Phraek

	Non-hunting area
25	Bo Lo
26	Khao Nam Phrai
27	Khao Phra Thaeo
28	Khao Pra–Bang Khram
29	Khlong Lam Chan
30	Laem Talumpuk
31	Ko Libong
32	Nong Plak Phraya– Khao Raya Bangsa
33	Thung Thale
	Forest park
34	Bo Namrong Kantang
35	Namtok Phan
36	Namtok Raman
37	Namtok Thara Sawan
38	Sa Nang Manora

== See also ==
- List of national parks of Thailand
- DNP - Mu Ko Lanta National Park
- List of Protected Areas Regional Offices of Thailand
