= Khao Lampi–Hat Thai Mueang National Park =

National Park in Thailand

- อุทยานแห่งชาติเขาลำปี–หาดท้ายเหมือง
- IUCN category II (national park)
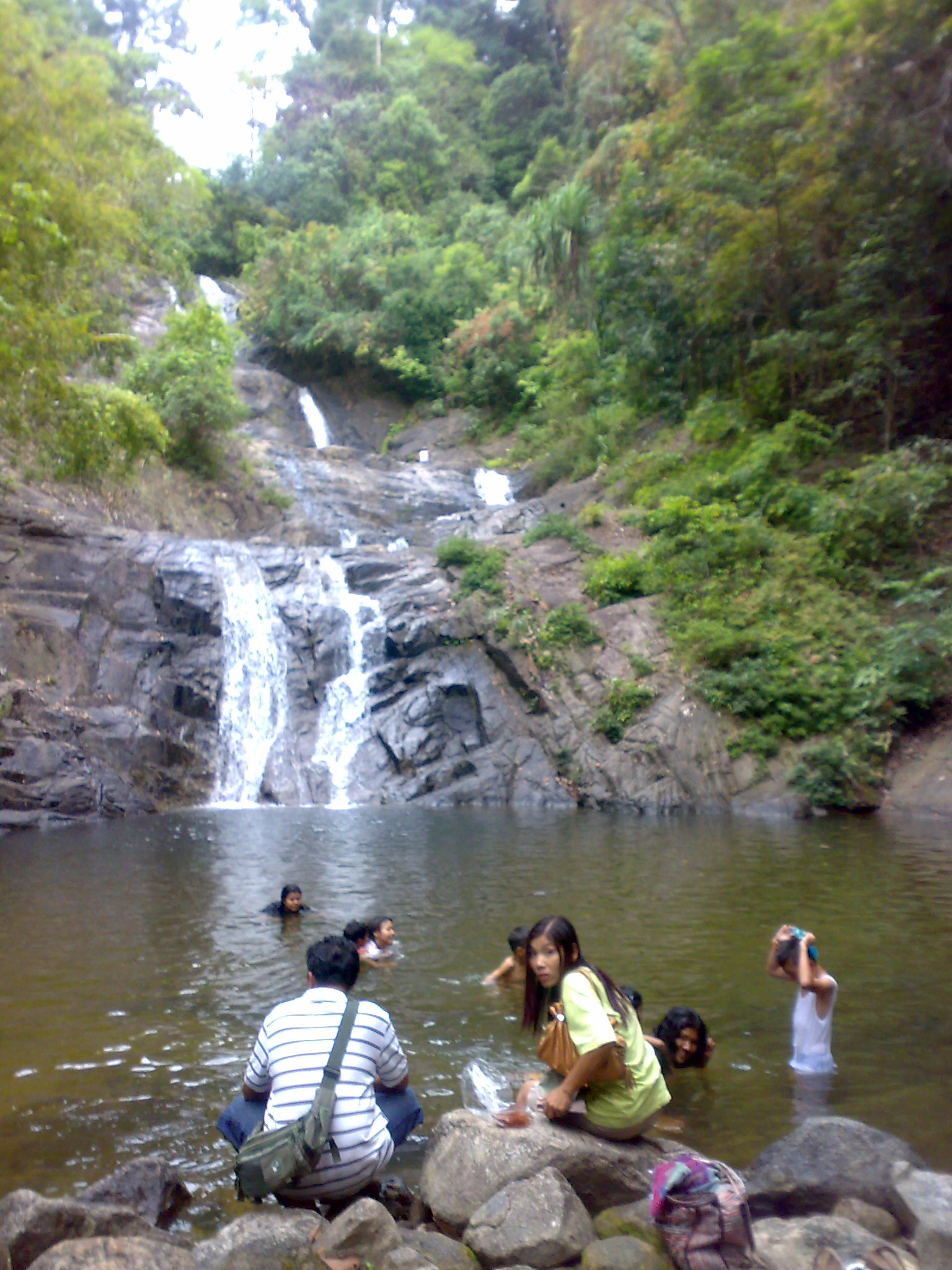
- Lampi Waterfall

- Location within Thailand
- Location: Thailand
- Nearest city: Phang Nga
- Coordinates: 8°25′22″N 98°14′29″E
- Area: 72 km^{2} (28 sq mi)
- Established: April 1986
- Visitors: 50,496 (in 2019)
- Governing body: Department of National Parks, Wildlife and Plant Conservation

Khao Lampi–Hat Thai Mueang National Park (Thai: อุทยานแห่งชาติเขาลำปี-หาดท้ายเหมือง) is a national park in Phang Nga Province, Thailand. The park is named for its two separate sections: Khao Lampi named for the park section containing Lampi mountain range and Hat Thai Mueang, the beach section of the park.

== Geography ==
Khao Lampi–Hat Thai Mueang National Park is located in Thai Mueang district, 75 kilometres (47 mi) north of Phuket city and about 60 kilometres (37 mi) west of Phang Nga town. The park lies just off Route 4 (Phetkasem Road). The park's total area is 44,950 rai ~ 72 square kilometres (28 sq mi) and its highest peak is Yot Khao Kanim mountain, in the northern part of the eastern section at 622 metres (2,040 ft).

== History ==
Previously known as Lampi Waterfall and Lampi Forest Park, Khao Lampi–Hat Thai Mueang became Thailand's 52nd national park on 14 April 1986.

== Attractions ==
The park is best known for its large waterfalls located in the mountainous eastern section. The largest of these is Ton Phrai Waterfall, 40 metres (130 ft) high and best seen during the rainy season. The park's namesake waterfall, Lampi, is of similar height but lesser volume and falls in numerous tiers.

The Hat Thai Mueang section consists of a pristine 13 kilometres (10 mi) white sand Andaman Sea beach backed by a mangrove forest. A distinguishing feature of the beach (and a prime reason for its protected status) is that it is a sea turtle nesting area. Between November and February sea turtles come to this stretch of beach to lay eggs. In March, a local festival marks when many of the newly hatched baby turtles make their way to the sea.

== Flora and fauna ==
The park's eastern section is covered in tropical rainforest, including such tree species as Dipterocarpus, Anisoptera costata, Hopea odorata and bullet wood. Bamboo and rattan are found at lower levels.

In the park's beach section, mangrove forests are found along brackish canals which feed from higher ground into the sea. The mangroves play a protective ecological role in numerous respects including filtration of water from higher ground and providing a sea life nursery. Additionally, the wave energy of the 2004 tsunami was dissipated somewhat by the mangroves in this area.

Further back from the seafront, beach forest is found including such species as Casuarina equisetifolia, Terminalia catappa, Derris indica and Barringtonia. Swamp forest is also present in this area and is one of the few areas on the Andaman sea coast featuring such an ecosystem.

Mammals in the park include Sumatran serow, Malayan tapir, lar gibbon and Malayan sun bear. Turtle species include leatherback, green and hawksbill. Pythons and Malayan pit vipers are also present.

Leatherback sea turtles swim seasonally to lay eggs on Thai Mueang Beach in the park. Thailand was once a sanctuary for leatherback turtles. Monitoring between 2003–2013 at Thai Mueang Beach found turtles laid 2,678 eggs there and 1,574, or 58.7 percent survived. The species is disappearing. Irresponsible trawler fishing is one of the factors to blame. Property development on the beach has kept the turtles away. Another factor is the traditional belief that consuming turtle eggs boost one's sexual prowess. There have been reports of villagers selling leatherback eggs for up to 150 baht each.

Freshwater fish include rare species such as non-local Nile tilapia, saltwater eel and Hemibagrus wyckii species of catfish. Less rare species such as Nieuhof's walking catfish and blue panchax are also found here.

Khao Lampi–Hat Thai Mueang is home to at least 188 bird species, including black-thighed falconet, oriental honey-buzzard, red junglefowl and thick-billed pigeon.

== Location ==
Khao Lampi-Hat Thai Mueang National Park in overview PARO 5 (Nakhon Si Thammarat)

6) Khao Lampi-Hat Thai Mueang National Park in overview PARO 5

	National park
1	Ao Phang Nga
2	Hat Chao Mai
3	Hat Khanom-Mu Ko Thale Tai
4	Hat Noppharat Thara– Mu Ko Phi Phi
5	Khao Lak-Lam Ru
6	Khao Lampi–Hat Thai Mueang
7	Khao Luang
8	Khao Nan
9	Khao Phanom Bencha
10	Mu Ko Lanta
11	Mu Ko Phetra
12	Mu Ko Similan
13	Mu Ko Surin
14	Namtok Si Khit
15	Namtok Yong
16	Si Phang Nga
17	Sirinat
18	Tarutao
19	Thale Ban
20	Than Bok Khorani

	Wildlife sanctuary
21	Kathun
22	Khao Pra–Bang Khram
23	Khlong Phraya
24	Namtok Song Phraek

	Non-hunting area
25	Bo Lo
26	Khao Nam Phrai
27	Khao Phra Thaeo
28	Khao Pra–Bang Khram
29	Khlong Lam Chan
30	Laem Talumpuk
31	Ko Libong
32	Nong Plak Phraya– Khao Raya Bangsa
33	Thung Thale
	Forest park
34	Bo Namrong Kantang
35	Namtok Phan
36	Namtok Raman
37	Namtok Thara Sawan
38	Sa Nang Manora

== See also ==
- List of national parks of Thailand
- DNP - Khao Lampi-Hat Thai Mueang National Park
- List of Protected Areas Regional Offices of Thailand
