= Si Phang Nga National Park =

National park in Thailand

- IUCN category II (national park)
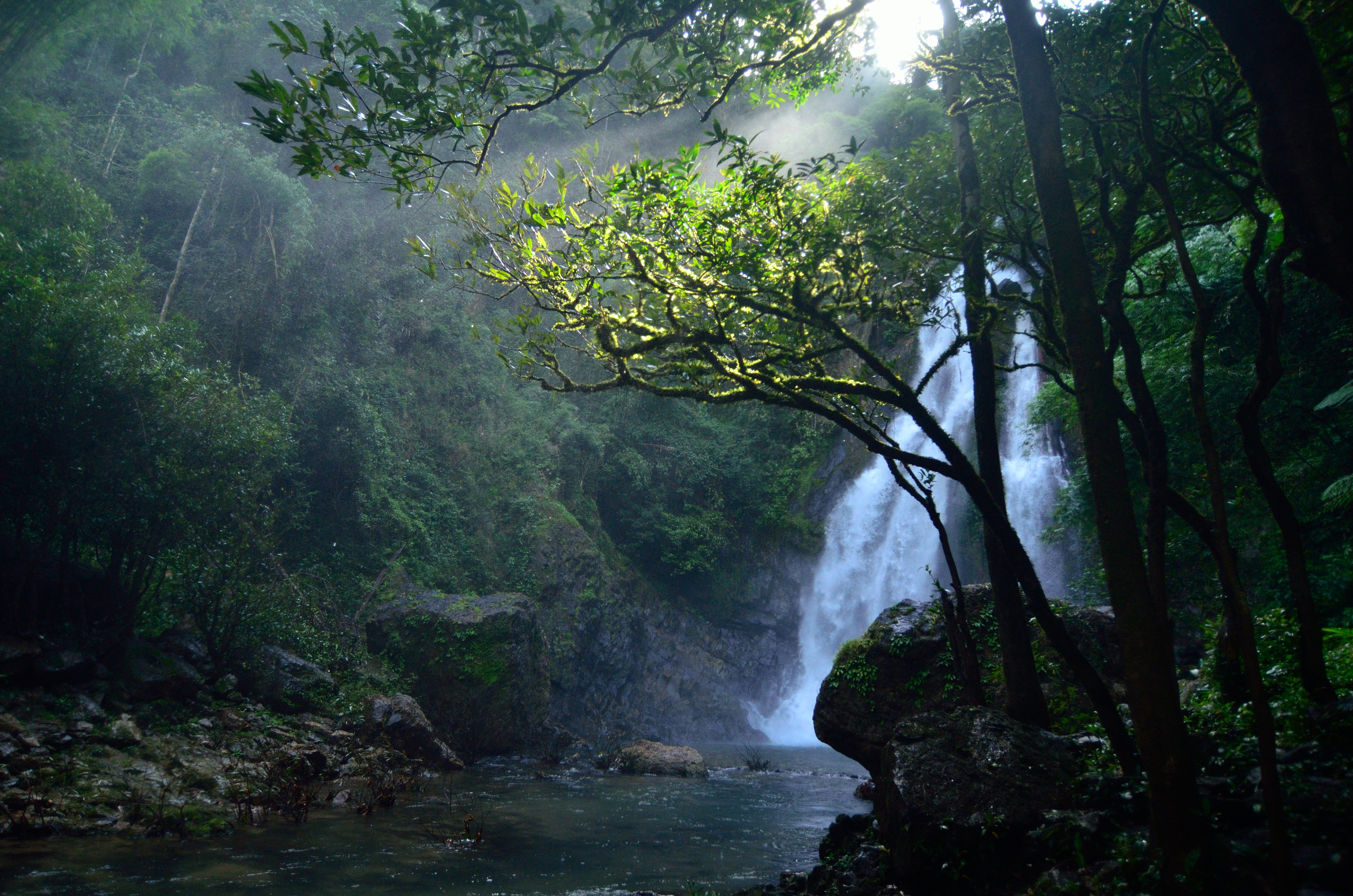

- Location within Thailand
- Location: Phang Nga Province, Thailand
- Nearest city: Takua Pa
- Coordinates: 9°08′53″N 98°28′19″E
- Area: 246 km^{2} (95 sq mi)
- Established: 16 Apr 1988
- Visitors: 21,251 (in 2019)
- Governing body: Department of National Parks, Wildlife and Plant Conservation
- Website: Department of National Parks

Si Phang Nga National Park (Thai: ศรีพังงา) is in Phang Nga Province in southern Thailand, covering the eastern parts of the districts Khura Buri and Takua Pa.

The landscape of the park is dominated by rugged mountains covered with dipterocarp forests, similar to the Khao Sok adjoining it to the east.

The establishment of the park was announced in the Royal Gazette, Issue 105, Chapter 60 of 16 April 1988.

The park occupies an area of 153,800 rai ~ 246 square kilometres (95 sq mi).

== Location ==
Si Phang Nga National Park in overview PARO 5 (Nakhon Si Thammarat)

16) Si Phang Nga National Park in overview PARO 5

	National park
1	Ao Phang Nga
2	Hat Chao Mai
3	Hat Khanom-Mu Ko Thale Tai
4	Hat Noppharat Thara– Mu Ko Phi Phi
5	Khao Lak-Lam Ru
6	Khao Lampi-Hat Thai Mueang
7	Khao Luang
8	Khao Nan
9	Khao Phanom Bencha
10	Mu Ko Lanta
11	Mu Ko Phetra
12	Mu Ko Similan
13	Mu Ko Surin
14	Namtok Si Khit
15	Namtok Yong
16	Si Phang Nga
17	Sirinat
18	Tarutao
19	Thale Ban
20	Than Bok Khorani

	Wildlife sanctuary
21	Kathun
22	Khao Pra–Bang Khram
23	Khlong Phraya
24	Namtok Song Phraek

	Non-hunting area
25	Bo Lo
26	Khao Nam Phrai
27	Khao Phra Thaeo
28	Khao Pra–Bang Khram
29	Khlong Lam Chan
30	Laem Talumpuk
31	Ko Libong
32	Nong Plak Phraya– Khao Raya Bangsa
33	Thung Thale
	Forest park
34	Bo Namrong Kantang
35	Namtok Phan
36	Namtok Raman
37	Namtok Thara Sawan
38	Sa Nang Manora

== See also ==
- List of national parks of Thailand
- DNP - Si Phang Nga National Park
- List of Protected Areas Regional Offices of Thailand
