= Ko Phra Thong =

Ko Phra Thong เกาะพระทอง
- Island
- Location within Thailand
- Coordinates: 9°6′0″N 98°17′0″E
- Country: Thailand
- Province: Phang Nga Province
- Seat: Thapayoi

Area
  - Total: 88 km^{2} (34 sq mi)

Population (2012)
  - Total: 300
- Time zone: UTC+7 (ICT)

Ramsar Wetland
- Official name: Ko Ra-Ko Phra Thong Archipelago
- Designated: 12 August 2013
- Reference no.: 2153

Ko Phra Thong (Thai: เกาะพระทอง, pronounced [kɔ̀ʔ pʰráʔ tʰɔːŋ]) is an island in Khura Buri District, Phang Nga Province, southern Thailand on the Andaman Sea. It has an area of 88 square kilometres (34 sq mi) and is separated from the mainland by a seven-metre-deep (23 ft) canal. The nearest town is Khura Buri, on the mainland about 10 km (6.2 mi) east.

Ko Phra Thong is the middle link in a chain of three islands. It is largely flat with expanses of inland savanna. It has long uninhabited beaches, fringed by coconut palms. There have always been a number of special natural features of Ko Phra Thong Island. It fronts onto over eight kilometres of beach on the Andaman Sea and, in addition, over 6 km (3.7 mi) of beach on a bay containing small islands. It is 60 km (37 mi) from the Surin Islands, Richelieu Rock, and only slightly further to the Similan Islands. All are renowned diving locations.

On the east side is a small fisher village, Thapayoi, and on the southeast end is another small village, Thung Dap. These villages total fewer than 300 inhabitants consisting of Moken, a tribe of sea gypsies, and Thais. The larger village, Thapayoi, has a school and a community health centre.

To the north is Ko Ra. It is long, mountainous, and covered in rain forest. The island is home to a number of animal species.

To the south is Ko Kho Khao which is similar to Ko Phra Tong.

The island is part of the Mu Ko Ra–Ko Phra Thong National Park, established in 2001.
