= Hat Khanom–Mu Ko Thale Tai National Park =

National park in Thailand

- หาดขนอม-หมู่เกาะทะเลใต้
- IUCN category II (national park)
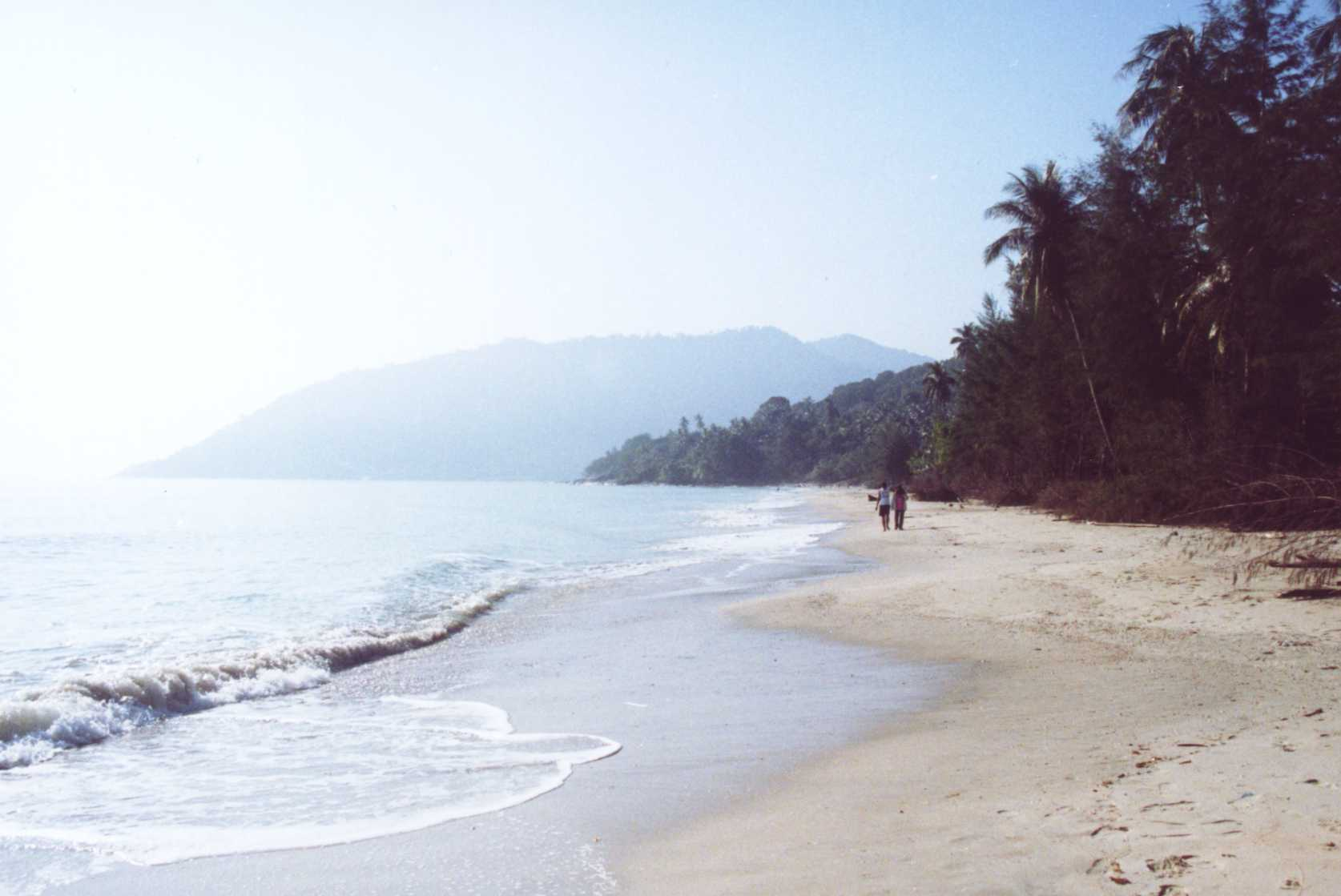

- Location within Thailand
- Location: Nakhon Si Thammarat Province, Surat Thani Province
- Nearest city: Nakhon Si Thammarat
- Coordinates: 9°13′0″N 99°51′0″E
- Area: 312 km^{2} (120 sq mi)
- Established: Preparation
- Visitors: 24,456 (in 2019)
- Governing body: Department of National Parks, Wildlife and Plant Conservation

Hat Khanom–Mu Ko Thale Tai (Thai: หาดขนอม-หมู่เกาะทะเลใต้) is a national park in the process of being established as of 2015. It is in southern Thailand, covering territory of the districts Khanom and Sichon of Nakhon Si Thammarat Province and Don Sak and Ko Samui of Surat Thani Province.

The name of the park refers to the two major parts of the park. Hat Khanom refers to the beaches of Khanom District, and the Thale Tai archipelago consists of eight islands in the Gulf of Thailand (Ko Mut Tang, Ko Mut Kong, Ko Rap, Ko Hua Ta Khe, Ko Wang Nai, Ko Wang Nak, Ko Noi, and Ko Ta Rai, all in the Sichon and Khanom District, Nakhon Si Thammarat Province, and Ko Samui District, Surat Thani) between Khanom and Ko Samui.

== Geography ==
The area of the park is 194,797 rai ~ 312 square kilometres (120 sq mi). Most of the area is covered with primary forest which is the provenance of many creeks. The park contains limestone mountains and mangrove forests.

== Climate ==
Southwesterly and northeasterly winds result in rainfall almost all year round. There are two seasons, summer (February–April) and rainy season (May–January).

== Flora and fauna ==
Primary forests consist of plants such as Intsia palembanica, Dipterocarpus species, Ironwood, Sandoricum koetjape and Indian oak. Mangrove forests with valuable plants such as mangroves, taboon and Thespesia populneoides. Limestone mountain contain plants such as chanpah and Opuntia elatior.

Mammals – Sus scrofa (wild pig), monkey, semno, squirrel, Menetes berdmorei (Indochinese ground squirrel), Naemorhedus sumatraensis, Muntiacus muntjak, Ursus malayanus, tiger, sambar, gibbon, and Malayan sun bear. Birds – Spilornis cheela (crested), Treron curvirostra (thick-billed pigeon), Copsychus saularis (Oriental), shama, dove, cormorant, Nicobar pigeon, seagull, Egretta sacra (Pacific reef egret) and Ducula aenea (green imperial) Reptiles – tortoise, snakes and chameleon. Amphibians – different kinds of frogs, Bufo asper. Other aquatic life – Channa striatus (serpenthead), crab, shrimp, saltwater fish, soro brook carp, and snakeheads.

== Location ==
Hat Khanom-Mu Ko Thale Tai National Park in overview PARO 5 (Nakhon Si Thammarat)

3) Hat Khanom-Mu Ko Thale Tai National Park in overview PARO 5

	National park
1	Ao Phang Nga
2	Hat Chao Mai
3	Hat Khanom–Mu Ko Thale Tai
4	Hat Noppharat Thara– Mu Ko Phi Phi
5	Khao Lak–Lam Ru
6	Khao Lampi–Hat Thai Mueang
7	Khao Luang
8	Khao Nan
9	Khao Phanom Bencha
10	Mu Ko Lanta
11	Mu Ko Phetra
12	Mu Ko Similan
13	Mu Ko Surin
14	Namtok Si Khit
15	Namtok Yong
16	Si Phang Nga
17	Sirinat
18	Tarutao
19	Thale Ban
20	Than Bok Khorani

	Wildlife sanctuary
21	Kathun
22	Khao Pra–Bang Khram
23	Khlong Phraya
24	Namtok Song Phraek

	Non-hunting area
25	Bo Lo
26	Khao Nam Phrai
27	Khao Phra Thaeo
28	Khao Pra–Bang Khram
29	Khlong Lam Chan
30	Laem Talumpuk
31	Ko Libong
32	Nong Plak Phraya– Khao Raya Bangsa
33	Thung Thale
	Forest park
34	Bo Namrong Kantang
35	Namtok Phan
36	Namtok Raman
37	Namtok Thara Sawan
38	Sa Nang Manora

== See also ==
- List of national parks of Thailand
- DNP - Hat Khanom-Mu Ko Thale Tai National Park
- List of Protected Areas Regional Offices of Thailand
