= Hat Noppharat Thara–Mu Ko Phi Phi National Park =

Marine protected area in Krabi Province, Thailand

Hat Noppharat Thara-Mu Ko Phi Phi National Park
- IUCN category II (national park)
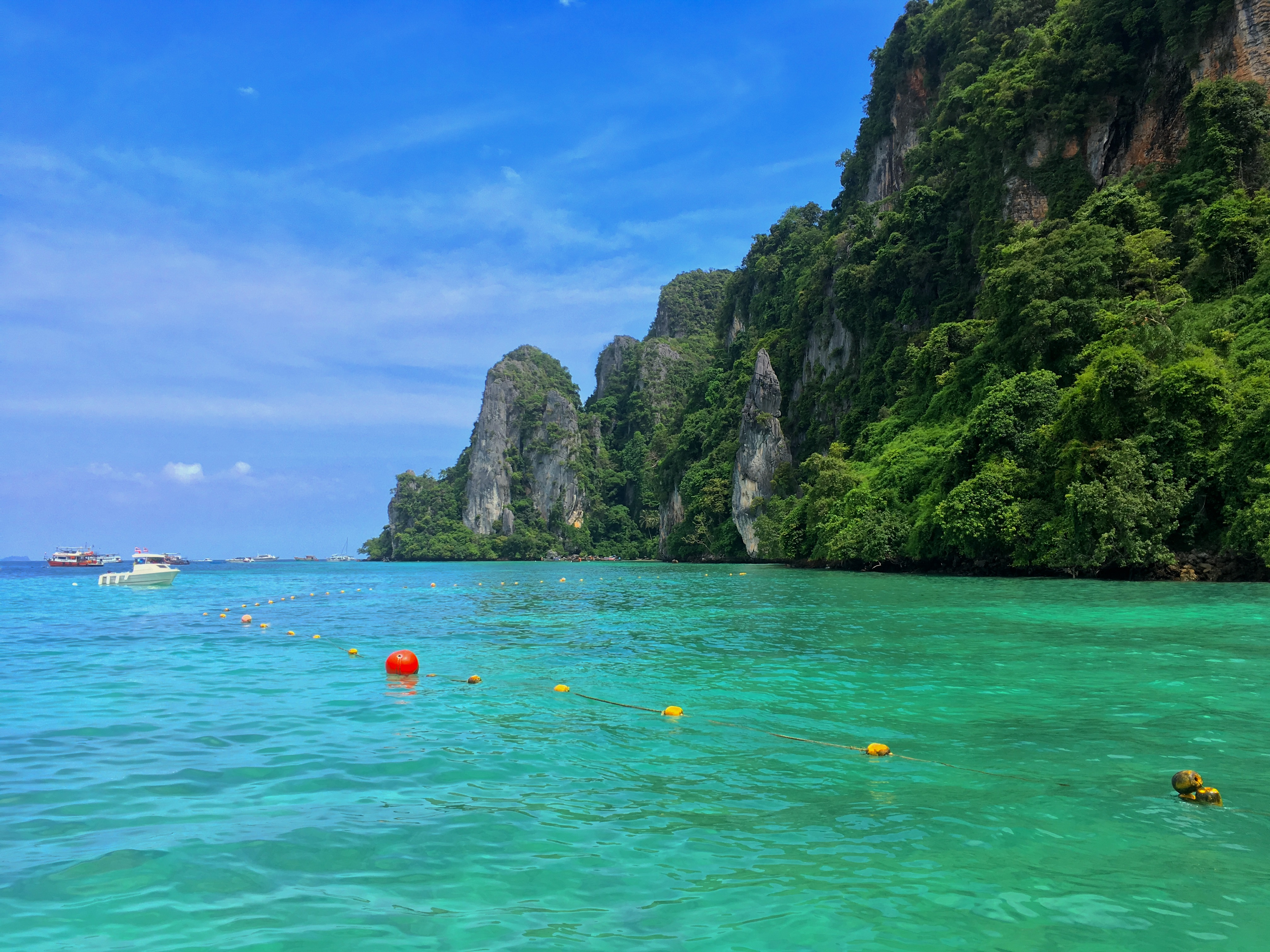
- View from a beach in Ko Phi Phi Don
- Interactive map of Hat Noppharat Thara-Mu Ko Phi Phi National Park
- Location: Krabi Province, Thailand
- Nearest city: Krabi
- Coordinates: 7.7333°N 98.7667°E
- Area: 388 km^{2} (150 sq mi)
- Established: 1983
- Visitors: 1,142,113 (in 2019)
- Governing body: Department of National Park, Wildlife and Plant Conservation (DNP)

Hat Noppharat Thara–Mu Ko Phi Phi National Park lies in the Ao Nang, Sai Thai, and Pak Nam Sub-districts of Amphoe Mueang Krabi, Krabi Province, Thailand. It is a marine national park. Established in 1983, it is an IUCN Category II protected area with coral reefs, and an area measuring 242,437 rai ~ 388 square kilometres (150 sq mi).

== Environment ==
=== Climate ===
The park is influenced by tropical monsoon winds resulting in two seasons: the first is a rainy season from May–December and a hot season from January–April. Average temperature ranges from 17-37 degrees Celsius. Average rainfall per year is about 2,231 millimeters, highest in July and lowest in February.

=== Wildlife ===
The park has been designated an Important Bird Area (IBA) by BirdLife International because it supports significant populations of pale-capped pigeons and Christmas Island frigatebirds.

=== Fossil Shell Beach ===
Susan Hoi Chet-sib Ha Lan Pee "The 75-Million-Year-Old Shell Cemetery" is located at Ban Laem Pho, which is part of the national park area. The fossil site stretches along the seashore for about 2 kilometers from west to east. The formation consists of layers of limestone slabs with a thickness ranging from 0.5 to 1 meter. Each limestone slab contains a large number of fossilized gastropods, mainly freshwater snails of the genus Viviparus, dating back to the Tertiary period more than 70 million years ago. These shells accumulated in enormous quantities and were later cemented together by calcium carbonate, forming solid rock layers. The slabs are stacked on top of one another in successive layers, resembling a broad concrete pavement. The fossil shells are clearly visible on both the upper surfaces and the sides of the limestone slabs. The limestone layers slope gently from the shoreline toward the land at an angle of about 10 degrees, creating a wide exposed rocky platform. As a result, the coastline here appears as a rocky terrace beach rather than a sandy beach. This site is considered one of the very few shell fossil cemeteries of its kind in the world.

== Visitors ==
From October 2015 to May 2016, 1.168 million tourists visited Hat Noppharat Thara-Mu Ko Phi Phi Marine National Park. Seventy-seven percent, or 900,466, were foreigners. Resulting revenues were 361.91 million baht, according to the Department of National Parks, Wildlife and Plant Conservation.

== Gallery ==
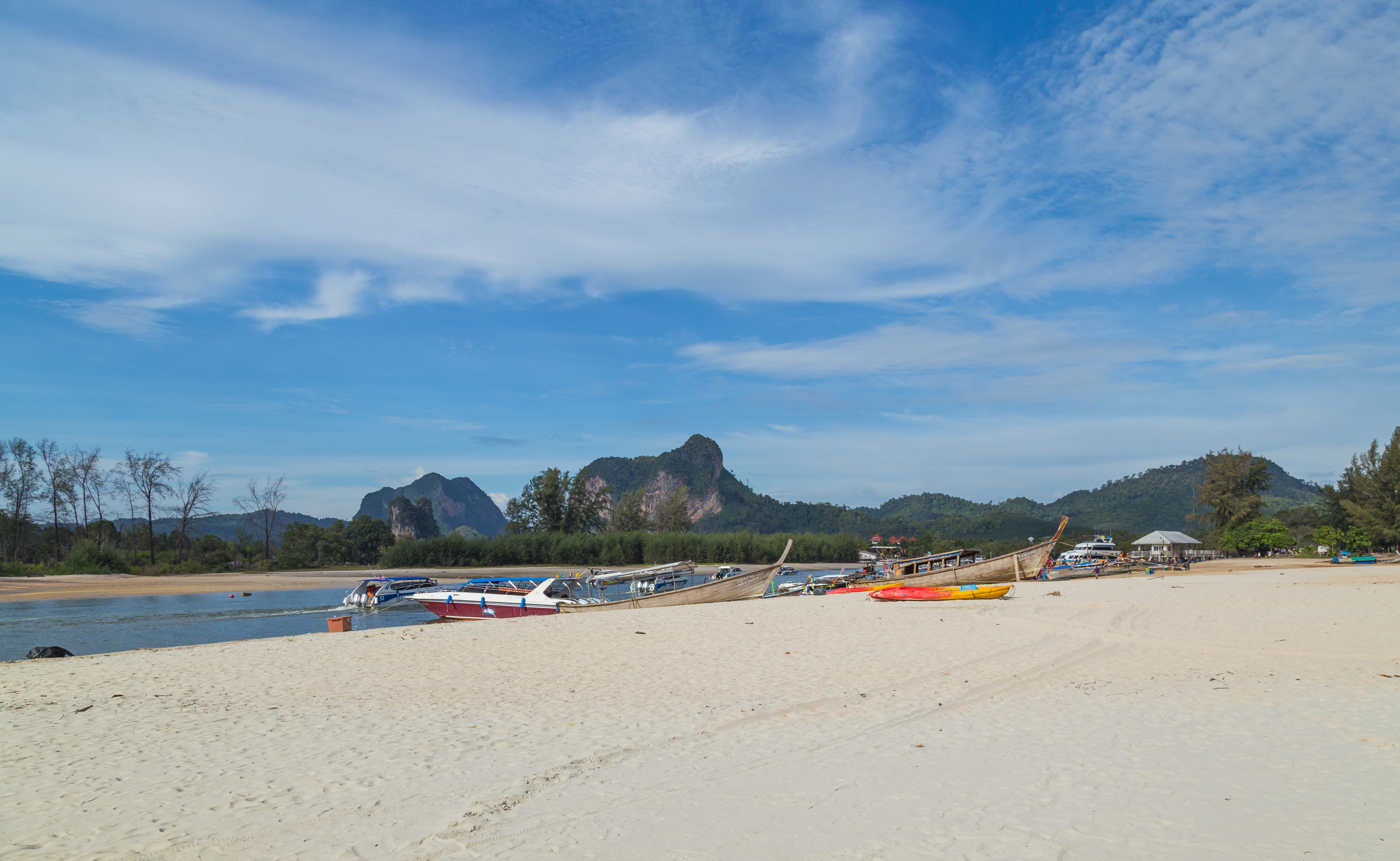
Boats at Noppharat Thara Pier

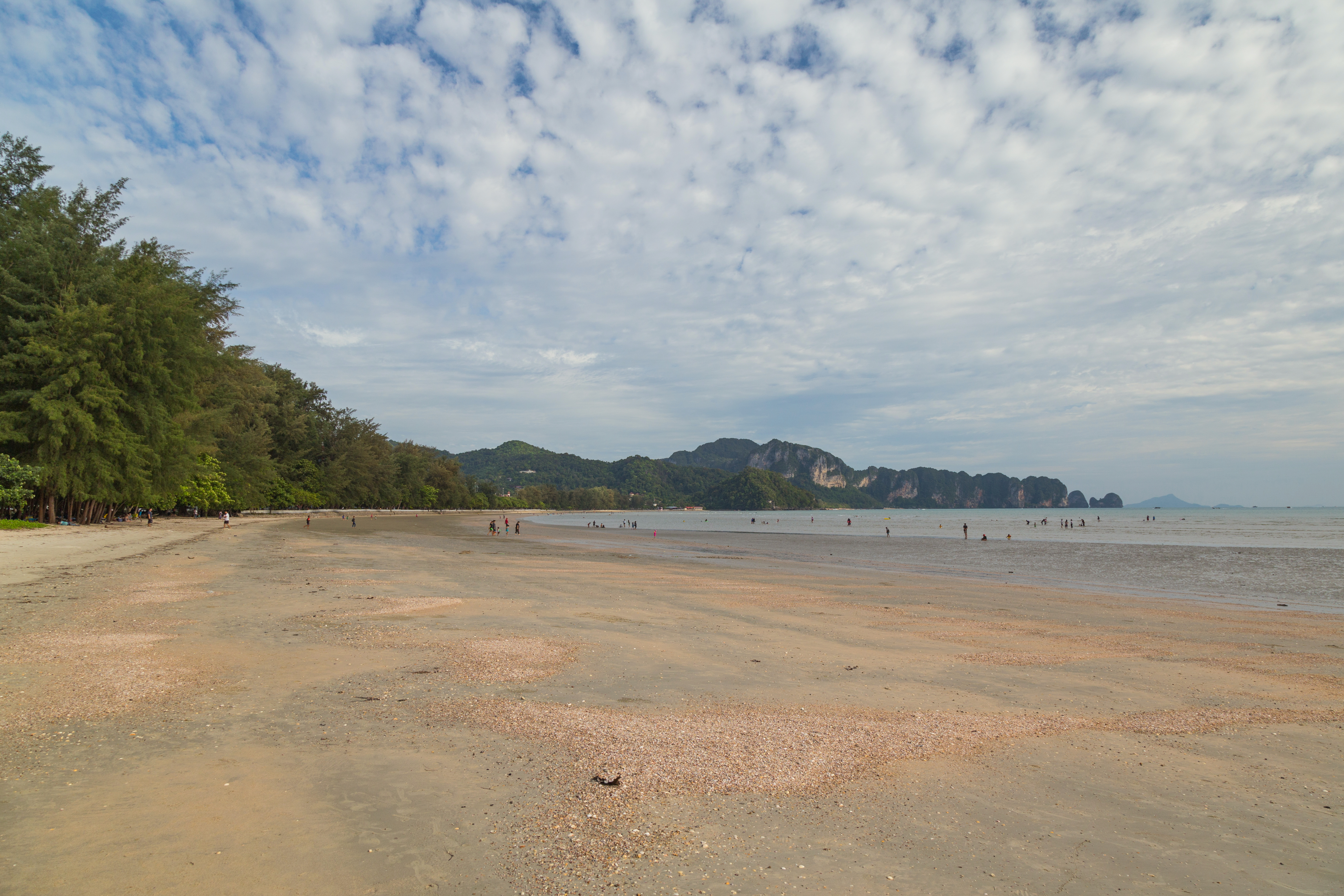
Noppharat Thara Beach

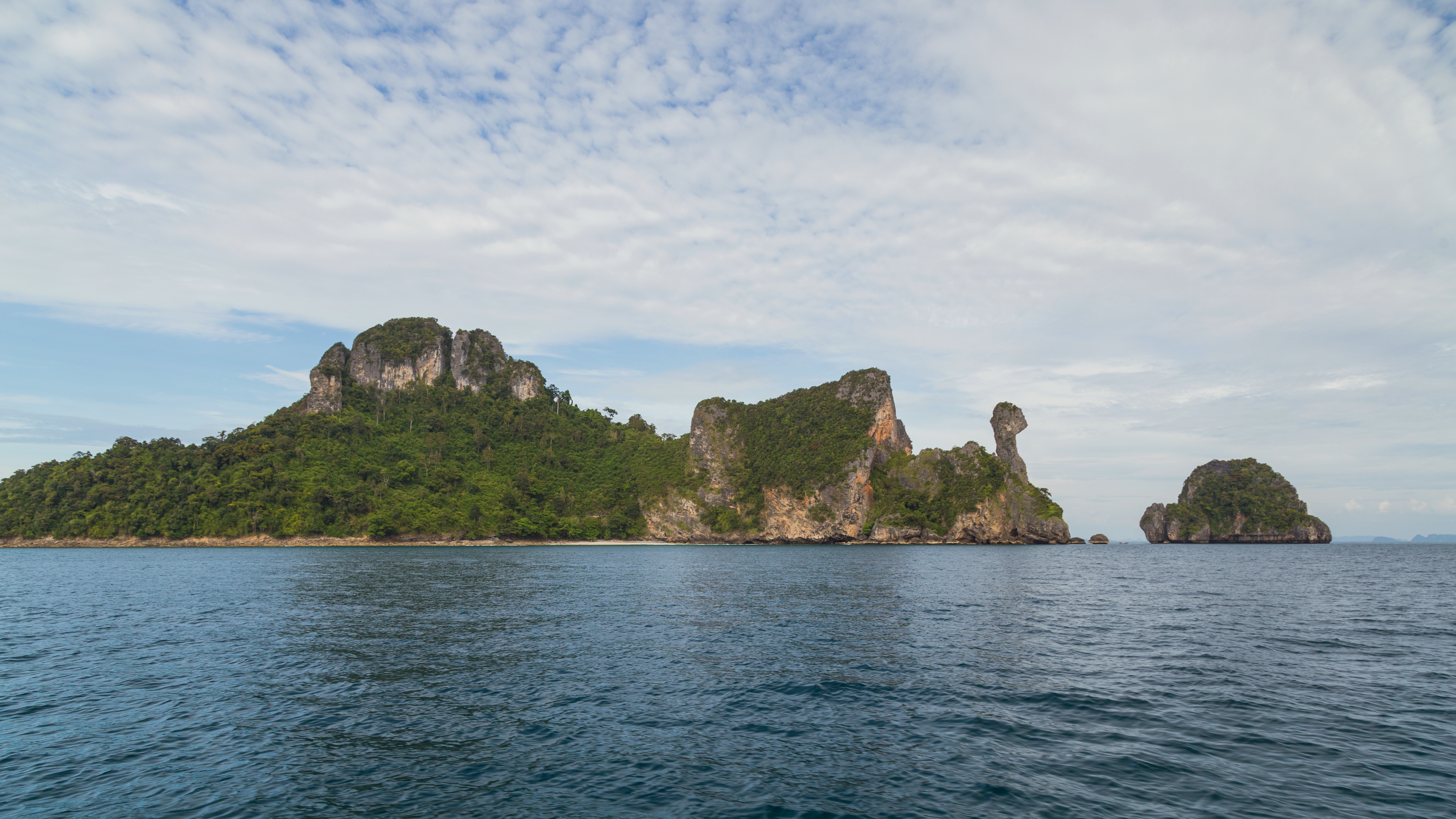
Ko Po Da Nok

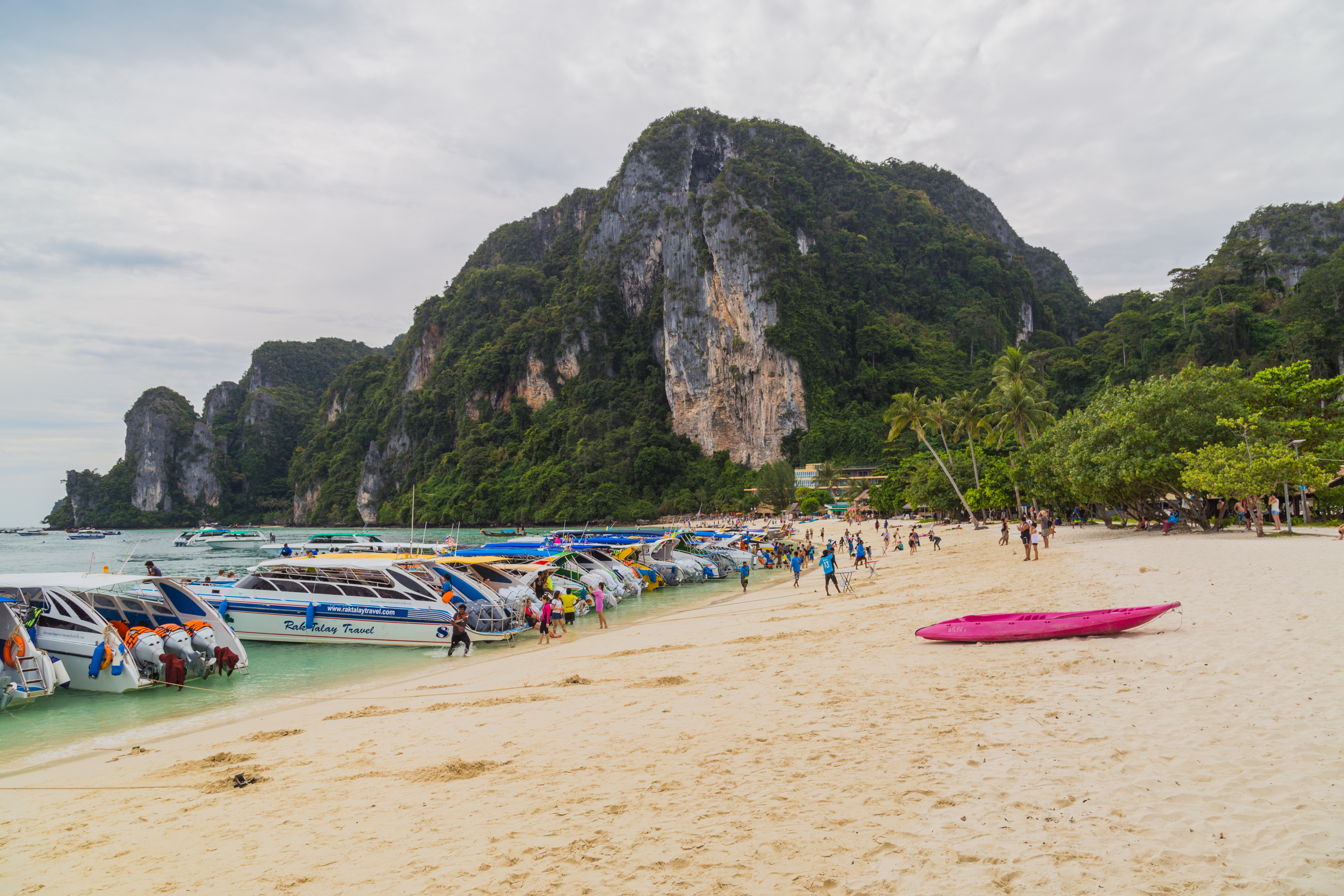
Ton Sai Beach, Ko Phi Phi Don

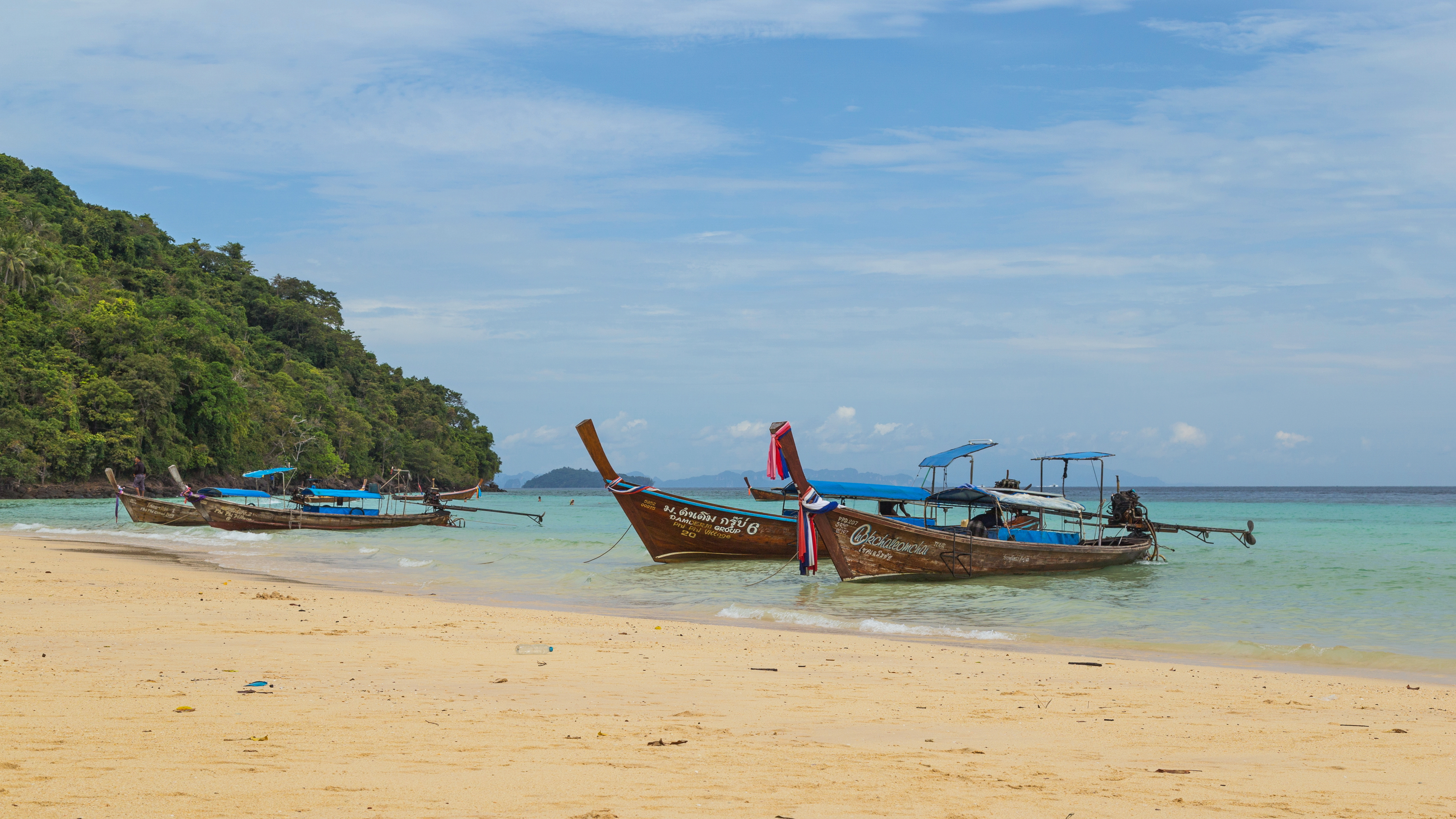
Long-tail boats. Loh Moo Dee Beach, Ko Phi Phi Don

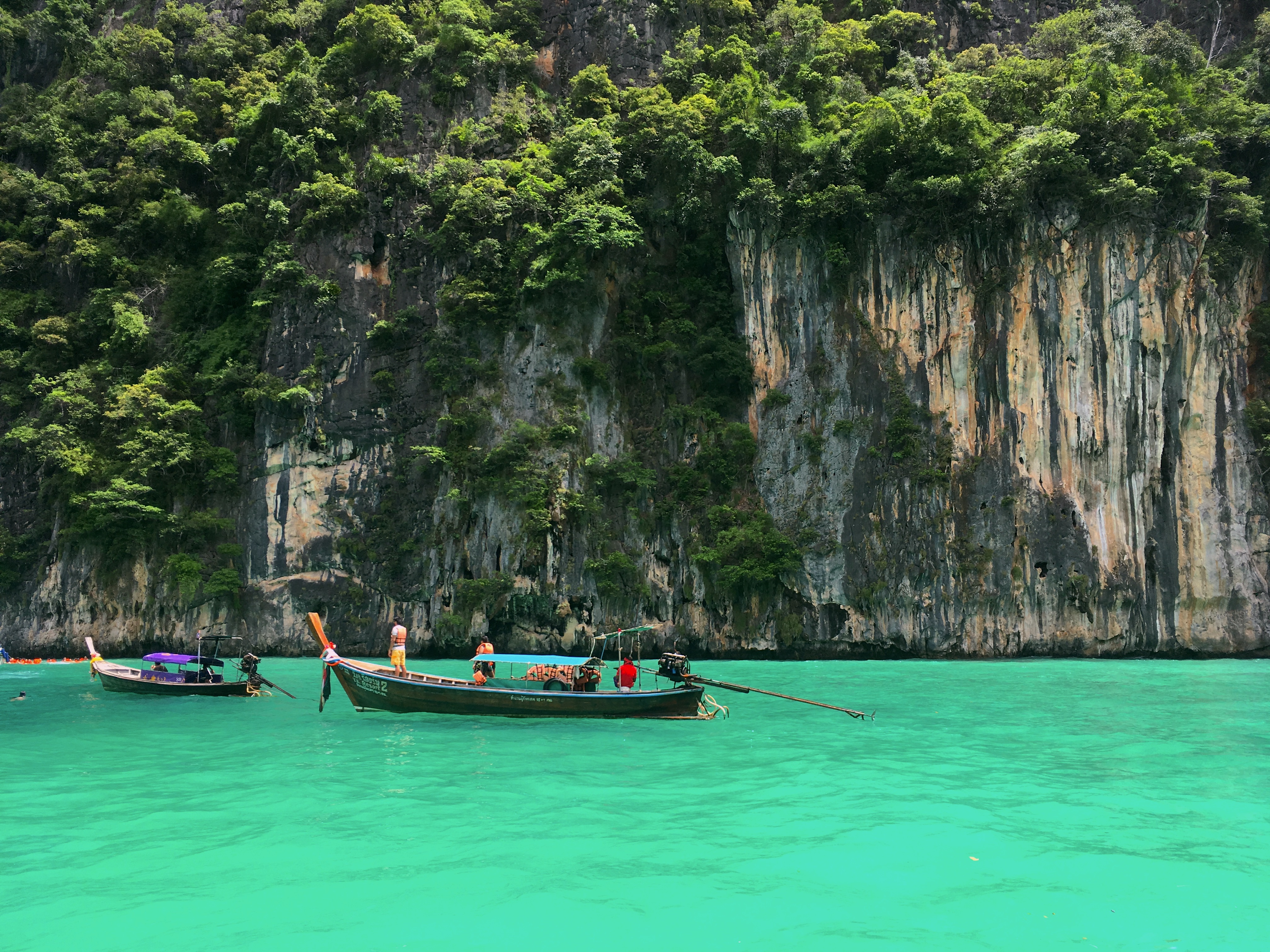
A Long-tail boat in Pileh Lagoon, Ko Phi Phi Le

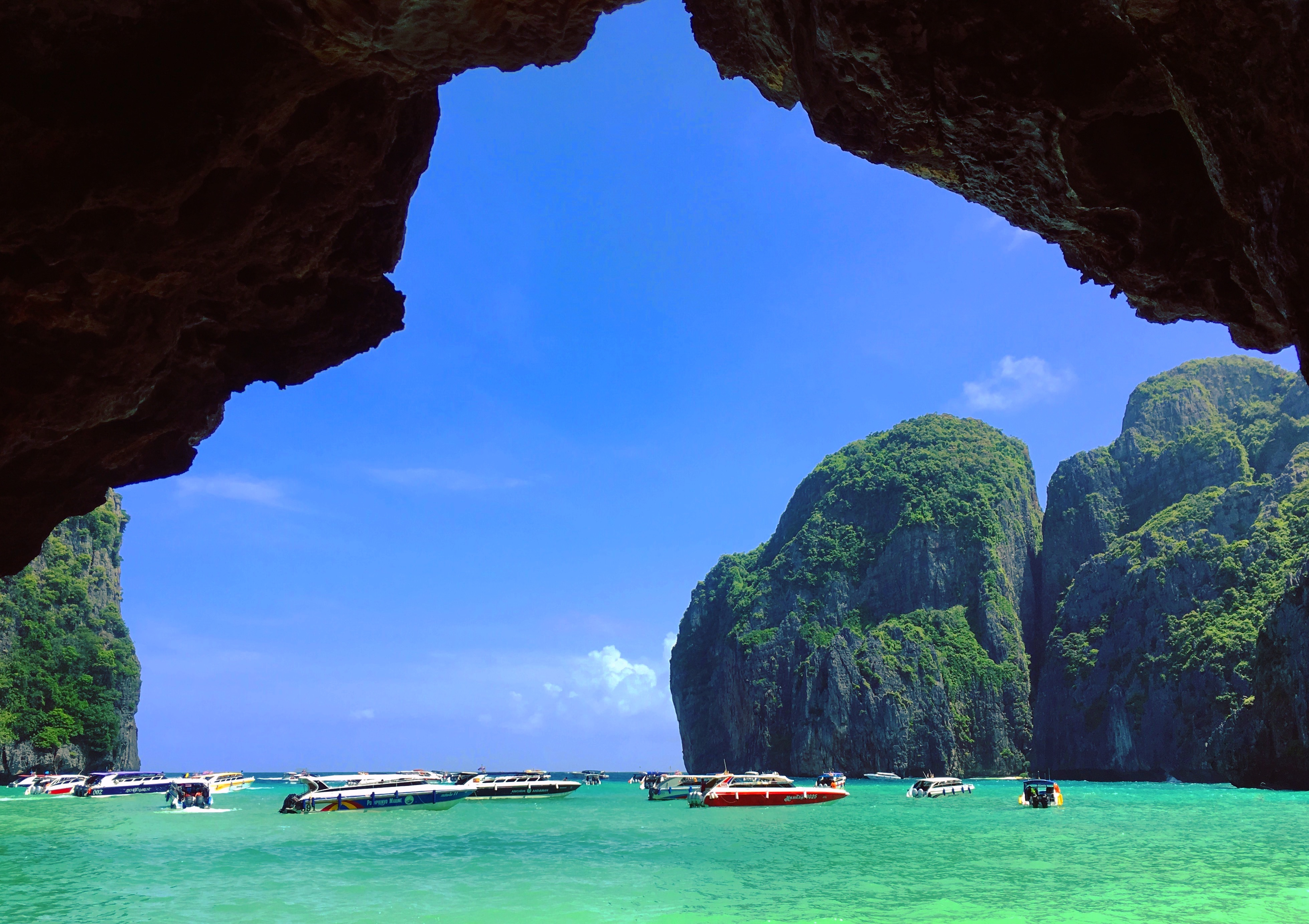
A view from Maya Bay, Ko Phi Phi Le

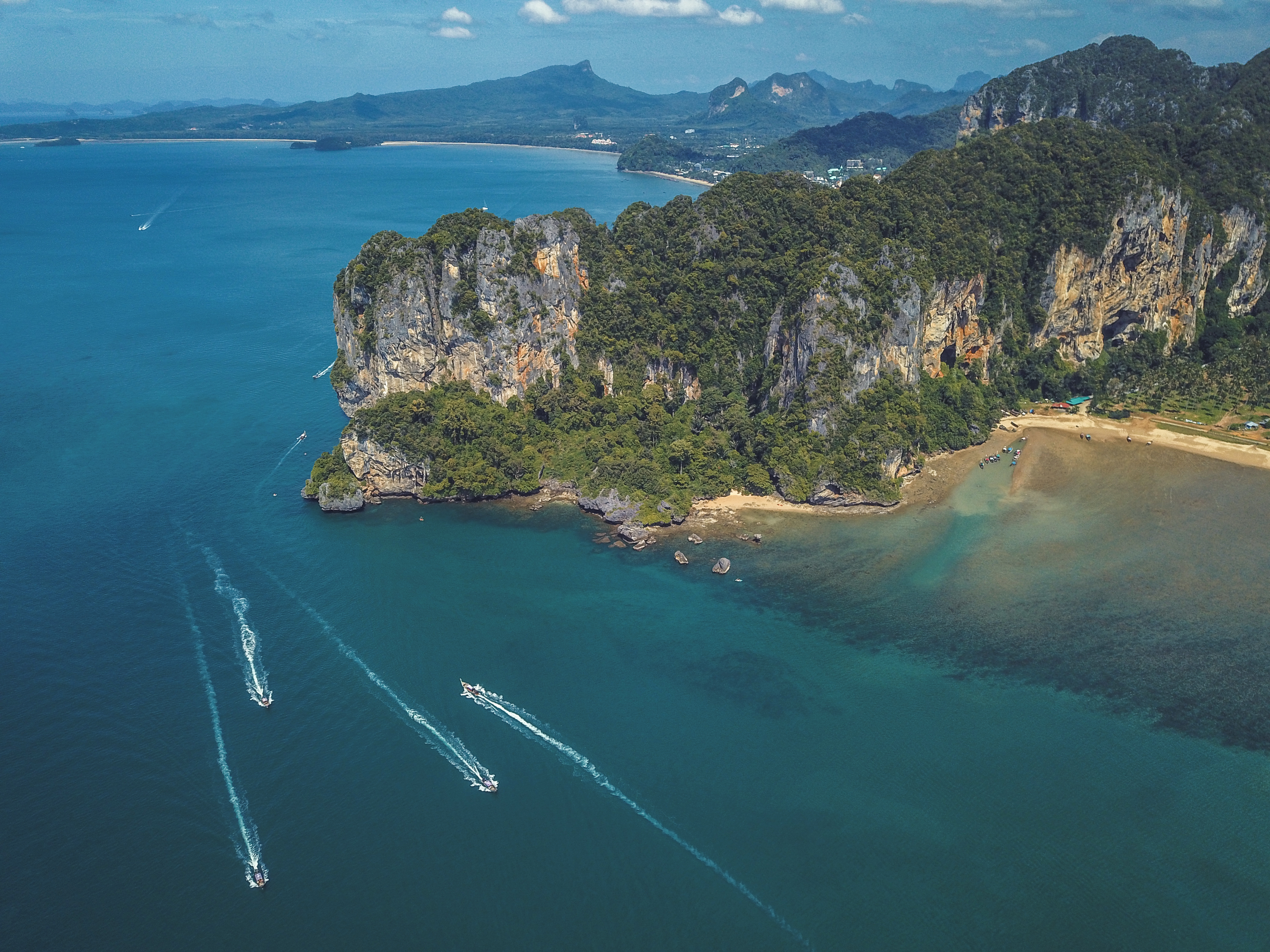

== Location ==
Hat Noppharat Thara-Mu Ko Phi Phi National Park in overview PARO 5 (Nakhon Si Thammarat)

4) Hat Noppharat Thara-Mu Ko Phi Phi National Park in overview PARO 5

	National park
1	Ao Phang Nga
2	Hat Chao Mai
3	Hat Khanom-Mu Ko Thale Tai
4	Hat Noppharat Thara–Mu Ko Phi Phi
5	Khao Lak-Lam Ru
6	Khao Lampi-Hat Thai Mueang
7	Khao Luang
8	Khao Nan
9	Khao Phanom Bencha
10	Mu Ko Lanta
11	Mu Ko Phetra
12	Mu Ko Similan
13	Mu Ko Surin
14	Namtok Si Khit
15	Namtok Yong
16	Si Phang Nga
17	Sirinat
18	Tarutao
19	Thale Ban
20	Than Bok Khorani

	Wildlife sanctuary
21	Kathun
22	Khao Pra–Bang Khram
23	Khlong Phraya
24	Namtok Song Phraek

	Non-hunting area
25	Bo Lo
26	Khao Nam Phrai
27	Khao Phra Thaeo
28	Khao Pra–Bang Khram
29	Khlong Lam Chan
30	Laem Talumpuk
31	Ko Libong
32	Nong Plak Phraya– Khao Raya Bangsa
33	Thung Thale
	Forest park
34	Bo Namrong Kantang
35	Namtok Phan
36	Namtok Raman
37	Namtok Thara Sawan
38	Sa Nang Manora

== See also ==
- List of national parks of Thailand
- DNP - Hat Noppharat Thara-Mu Ko Phi Phi National Park
- List of Protected Areas Regional Offices of Thailand
