= Khao Phanom Bencha National Park =

National park in Thailand

- อุทยานแห่งชาติเขาพนมเบญจา
- IUCN category II (national park)
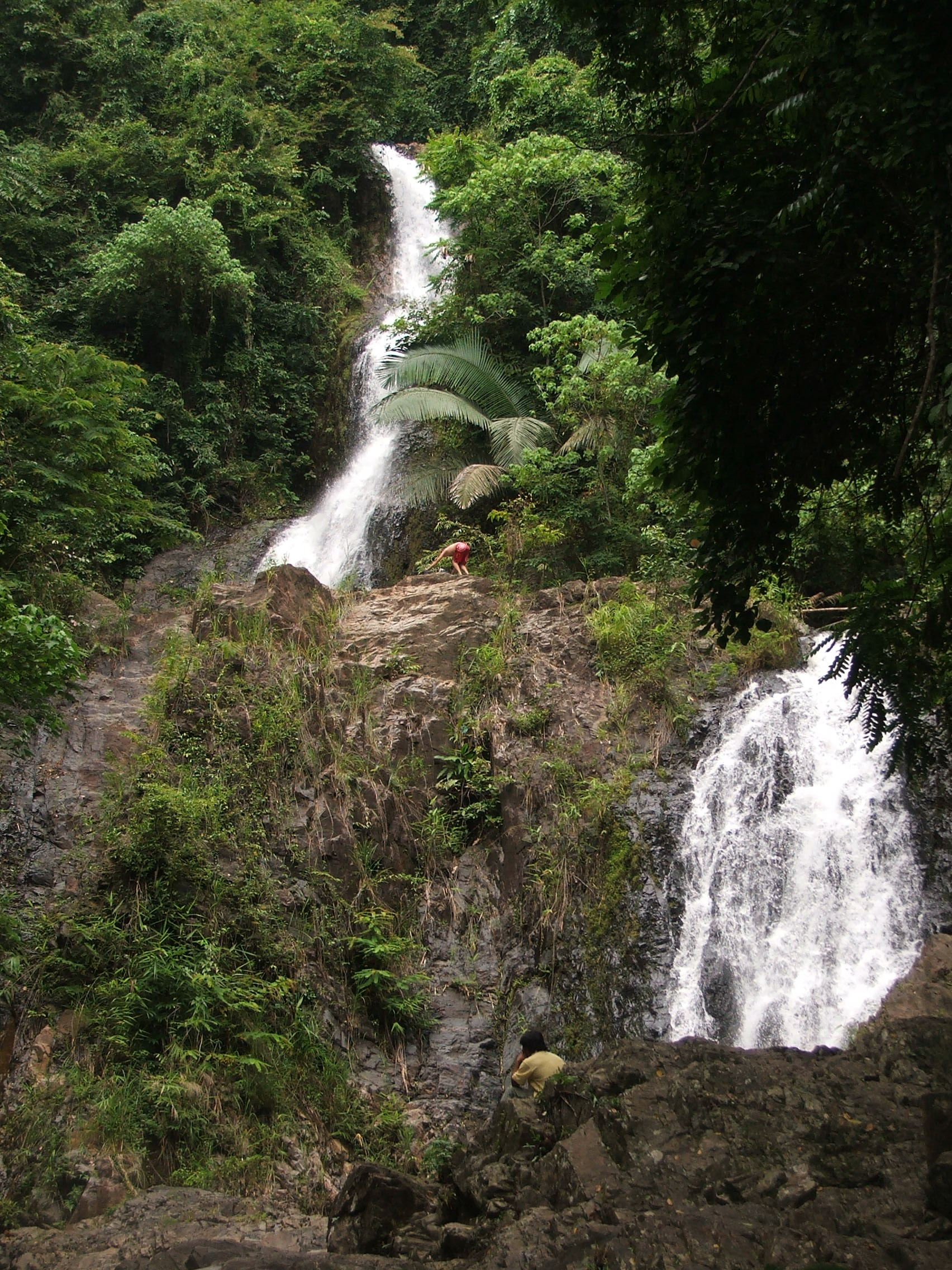
- Huai To Waterfall

- Location within Thailand
- Location: Krabi Province, Thailand
- Nearest city: Krabi
- Coordinates: 8°14′31″N 98°54′55″E
- Area: 50 km^{2} (19 sq mi)
- Established: 1981
- Visitors: 17,307 (in 2019)
- Governing body: Department of National Parks, Wildlife and Plant Conservation

Khao Phanom Bencha National Park (Thai: อุทยานแห่งชาติเขาพนมเบญจา) is a national park in Krabi Province, Thailand. The park is named for Khao Phanom Bencha mountain and protects an area of virgin rainforest and rare wildlife.

== Geography ==
Khao Phanom Bencha is 20 kilometres (12 mi) north of Krabi town and encompasses parts of Krabi, Khao Phanom and Ao Luek districts. The park's area is 31,325 rai ~ 50 square kilometres (19 sq mi) and reaches its highest point at the 1,397 metres (4,580 ft) peak of Khao Phanom Bencha, part of a mountain range running north to south.

== Attractions ==
The park has numerous large waterfalls, including Huai To Falls, a waterfall of five cascades and a height of 80 metres (260 ft). Nearby Huai Sakhe Falls is a waterfall of three cascades.

Khao Pheung is a cave featuring stalactites and stalagmites. The Khao Phanom Bencha mountain peak is thickly forested and climbable on a multi-day trek.

== Flora and fauna ==
The park's forest includes such tree species as teak, takian, Dipterocarpus alatus, Lagerstroemia, Magnolia champaca and Parkia speciosa. At lower elevations Calamus palms and bamboo are found.

Animal species include clouded leopard, Sumatran serow, tapir, black bear and mouse deer. Numerous monkey species reside within the park such as langur, lar gibbon and stump-tailed macaque.

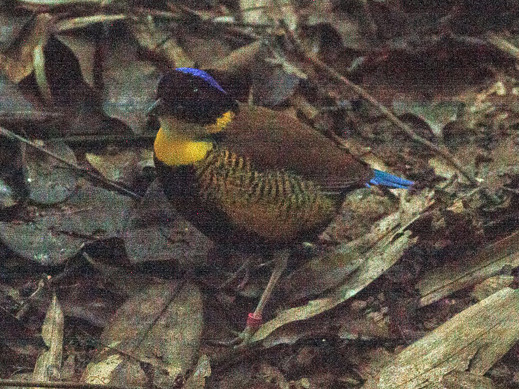
Male Gurney's Pitta

Khao Phanom Bencha is home to over 200 bird species and is a significant bird-spotting area. Species include white-crowned and helmeted hornbill, white-rumped shama and argus pheasant. An extremely rare bird here is the endangered Gurney's pitta.

== Location ==
Khao Phanom Bencha National Park in overview PARO 5 (Nakhon Si Thammarat)

9) Khao Phanom Bencha National Park in overview PARO 5

	National park
1	Ao Phang Nga
2	Hat Chao Mai
3	Hat Khanom-Mu Ko Thale Tai
4	Hat Noppharat Thara– Mu Ko Phi Phi
5	Khao Lak-Lam Ru
6	Khao Lampi-Hat Thai Mueang
7	Khao Luang
8	Khao Nan
9	Khao Phanom Bencha
10	Mu Ko Lanta
11	Mu Ko Phetra
12	Mu Ko Similan
13	Mu Ko Surin
14	Namtok Si Khit
15	Namtok Yong
16	Si Phang Nga
17	Sirinat
18	Tarutao
19	Thale Ban
20	Than Bok Khorani

	Wildlife sanctuary
21	Kathun
22	Khao Pra–Bang Khram
23	Khlong Phraya
24	Namtok Song Phraek

	Non-hunting area
25	Bo Lo
26	Khao Nam Phrai
27	Khao Phra Thaeo
28	Khao Pra–Bang Khram
29	Khlong Lam Chan
30	Laem Talumpuk
31	Ko Libong
32	Nong Plak Phraya– Khao Raya Bangsa
33	Thung Thale
	Forest park
34	Bo Namrong Kantang
35	Namtok Phan
36	Namtok Raman
37	Namtok Thara Sawan
38	Sa Nang Manora

== See also ==
- List of national parks of Thailand
- DNP - Khao Phanom Bencha National Park
- List of Protected Areas Regional Offices of Thailand
