= Surin Islands =

Marine protected archipelago in Andaman Sea, Thailand

Native name: หมู่เกาะสุรินทร์
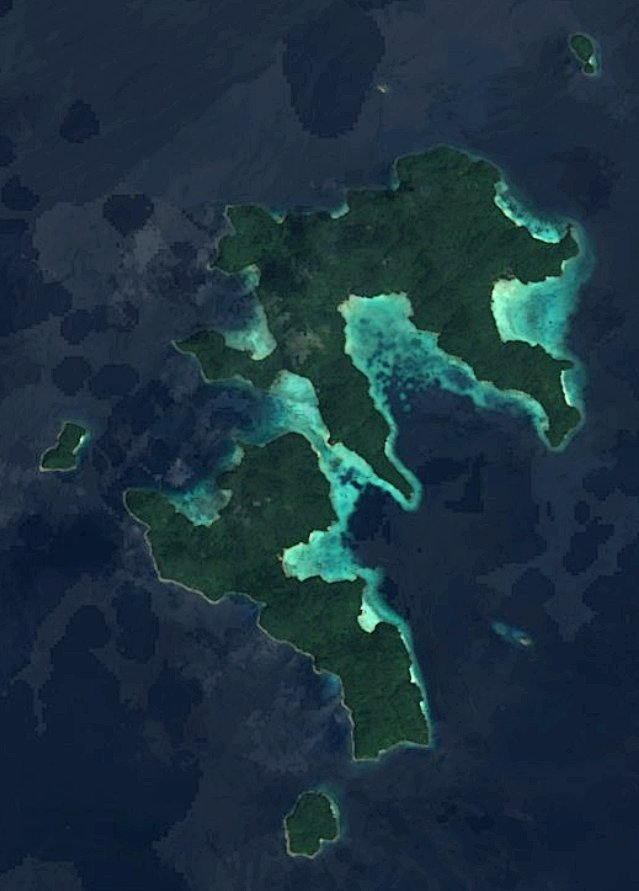
1	Ko Surin Nuea
2	Ko Surin Tai
3	Ko Khai
4	Ko Glang
5	Ko Chi
6	Hin Kong
7	Hin Rap
8	Chong Kaad Bay
9	Mai Ngam beach
Satellite Photo in 2017
- Interactive map of Surin Islands

Geography
- Location: Andaman Sea
- Coordinates: 9°25′N 97°52′E
- Total islands: 5
- Major islands: Ko Surin Nuea, Ko Surin Tai
- Area: 33 km^{2} (13 sq mi)
- Length: 12.6 km (7.83 mi)
- Width: 8.3 km (5.16 mi)
- Highest elevation: 255 m (837 ft)

Administration
- Thailand
- Province: Phang Nga
- District: Khura Buri
- Tambon: Ko Phra Thong

Demographics
- Population: 150–330
- Ethnic groups: Moken, Thai

Additional information
- Time zone: ICT (UTC+7)
- Postal code: 82150
- National park

The Surin Islands (Thai: หมู่เกาะสุริน, romanized: muu gaw soo rin, Thai pronunciation: [mùː kɔ̀ʔ sùrin]) is a continental archipelago of five islands in the Andaman Sea, 55 kilometres (34 mi) from the Thai mainland. Administratively, the islands are part of Tambon Ko Phra Thong, Khura Buri district, in Phang Nga province, Thailand.

== Geography ==
=== Location ===
The Surin Islands consist primarily of two larger islands, Ko Surin Nuea and Ko Surin Tai, which are separated by a channel approximately 200 m (660 ft) wide that becomes dry at low tide. In addition to these, the archipelago includes three smaller islands: Ko Khai (also known as Ko Torinla), Ko Glang (or Ko Pachumba), and Ko Chi (also referred to as Ko Satok). There are also two small rocky islets within the group, named Hin Kong and Hin Rap. Additionally, the limestone pinnacle known as Richelieu Rock (Hin Plo Naam), located about 18 km (11 mi) east of Ko Khai and 45 kilometres (28 mi) from the mainland, is named in honor of admiral Andreas Richelieu, who was the first and only foreign commander-in-chief of the Thai Navy.

Geographically, the Thai-Burmese oceanic border lies a few kilometers north of Ko Chi. Christie Island, which marks Myanmar's southernmost point, is situated 18 km (11 mi) north of Ko Surin Nuea. To the south, approximately 100 km (62 mi) away, lies the Mu Ko Similan National Park.

=== Formation ===
Geological theories suggest that a subduction event during the Mesozoic era, involving the Burma and Sunda Plates, led to the formation of the numerous granite islands and undersea pinnacles along the west coast of Thailand. This process entailed the descending plate moving forward and being uplifted by the underlying plate. As a result, various geological structures, including pinnacles and outcroppings, were dislodged and amalgamated onto the ascending plate, eventually giving rise to small island chains and underwater seamounts. The predominant composition of these islands and seamounts is intrusive granitoids, a type of igneous rock. Over time, these base rocks have become encrusted with a thick layer of limestone, primarily composed of coral skeletons, with living corals continuing to grow on the outer surfaces.

== Climate ==
Statistics
	2012	2013	2014	2015	2016
Low	15.2 °C, 59.4 °F	12.0 °C, 53.6 °F	22.1 °C, 71.8 °F	12.8 °C, 55.0 °F	8.0 °C, 46.4 °F
Average	27.8 °C, 82.0 °F	27.5 °C, 81.5 °F	27.5 °C, 81.5 °F	28.0 °C, 82.4 °F	28.2 °C, 82.8 °F
High	39.3 °C, 103 °F	40.0 °C, 104 °F	30.2 °C, 86.4 °F	41.3 °C, 106 °F	42.0 °C, 108 °F
In a 30 day month	82.7 mm, 3.26 in	132.2 mm, 5.20 in	114.1 mm, 4.49 in	105.7 mm, 4.16 in	115.3 mm, 4.54 in

A hot season runs from mid-February to May. The rainy season is from mid-May to October, the rainiest month. The annual average rainfall is 1,350 millimetres (53 in) with average humidity of 71 percent and 104 rain days. Highest average wind speeds are observed in December with 3.73 knots (6.9 km/h).

== Moken people ==
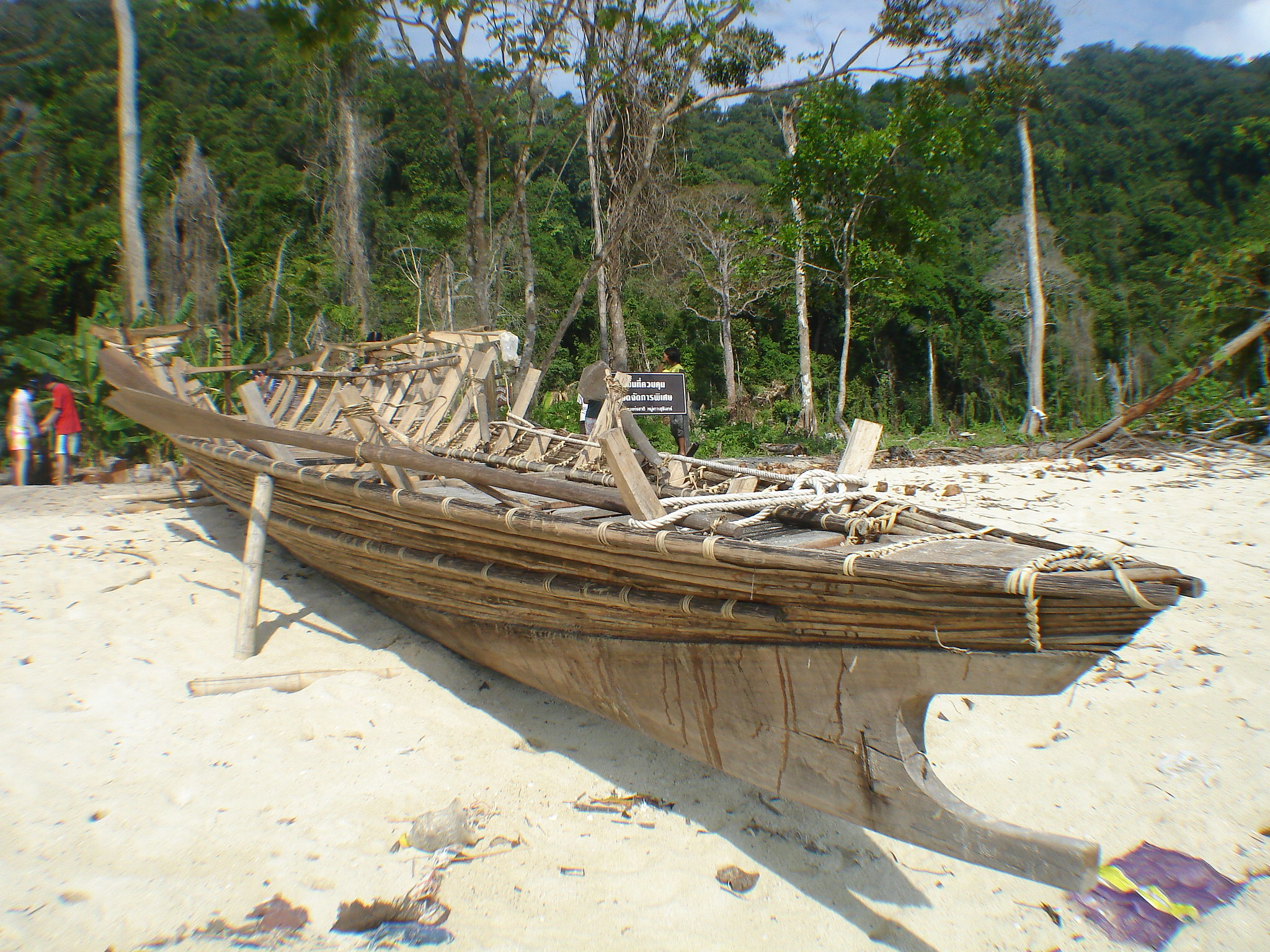
A Moken boat. Note the bifurcated bow, in contrast to traditional Thai fishing boats.

The Surin Islands are home to a small community of the Moken or Morgan people (Thai: ชาวเล, romanized: chaao laeh, lit. 'sea people', 'sea gypsies'). The Moken population on the Surin Islands is estimated to be between 150 and 330 individuals.

The Moken belong to one of three distinct tribes living along the Andaman Coast of Myanmar and Thailand. These include the Moken of the Mergui Archipelago, the Moklen of Phang Nga Province, and the Urak Lawoi, who reside from Phuket Province down to Satun Province. These groups, having Austronesian origins, are known for their distinct languages (Moken, Moklen, Urak Lawoi'), culture, and lifestyle. They have a history of peaceful coexistence with their mainland neighbors. Traditionally, the Moken, particularly those in the Mergui Archipelago and along Thailand's North Andaman coast, led a nomadic life, spending much of their time on traditional houseboats known as kabang. This way of life allowed them to move from bay to bay, following the wind and weather patterns. The last kabang was reportedly built in 2006, with efforts to revive this traditional practice emerging around 2018.

The Moken community, which does not have a written language, relies on oral tradition to preserve and pass down their cultural heritage and knowledge.

Within the Moken community, familial bonds are notably strong and reliable. Linguistically, the Moken language lacks terms for individual possession, which is reflective of their cultural emphasis on sharing and communal living.

The Moken traditionally do not adhere to any formalized religion. Their practices include ancestor worship, which is evident in their funeral customs. In accordance with their traditions, deceased family members are buried beneath the family's house, accompanied by sea shells and other offerings as part of their ritualistic practices. The Moken possess a profound understanding of and respect for their natural environment and resources. Historically, they engaged in a subsistence lifestyle as hunter-gatherers, relying on the trade of shells, sea cucumbers, and fish in exchange for rice and other essentials. They have demonstrated extensive knowledge of local flora, utilizing 83 plant species for food, 33 for medicinal purposes, 53 for the construction of huts, boats, and tools, and 54 species for various other uses.

== National Park ==
Year	Visitors
2012	16,711
2013	17,086
2014	11,055
2015	15,563
2016	52,517

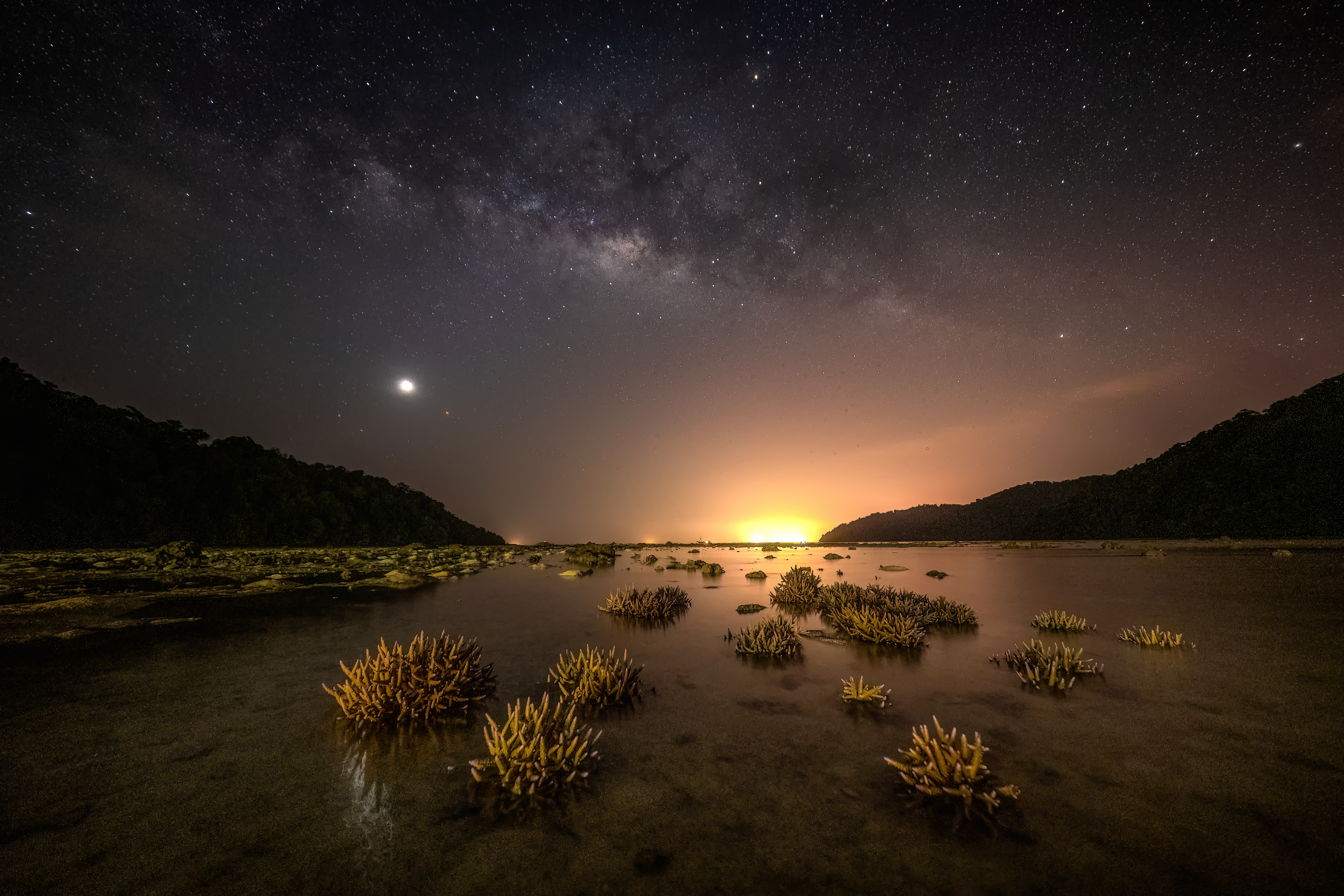
A coral reef visible at low tide

Mu Ko Surin National Park (Thai: อุทยานแห่งชาติหมู่เกาะสุรินทร์, romanized: oot yaan haeng chaa dti muu gaw soo ri noht), officially designated as Thailand's 30th national park of Thailand on 9 July 1981 and later expanded on 6 July 2007, encompasses a group of islands along with their surrounding waters. Covering an area of approximately 88,282 rais ~141.25 square kilometres (54.54 mi^{2}), of which 108 km^{2} (42 sq mi) or 76 percent is ocean.

Access to the park is typically through day trips using speedboats from Khao Lak and Khura Buri Pier, or via multi-day cruises. Visitors can pay the entrance fee at several locations, including the Surin Islands Visitor Center in Khura Buri, the park's headquarters at Chong Kaad Bay on Ko Surin Nuea, or directly to staff at Richelieu Rock. Accommodation options on Ko Surin Nuea include camping at Mai Ngam beach and a limited number of lodgings at Chong Kaad Bay. Besides the Moken village and park facilities, there are no other buildings on the islands, and most of the land areas, except for the Moken village and designated campsite, are restricted to visitors. During the high season, the park receives approximately 450 to 800 visitors daily. Mu Ko Surin National Park is typically open from 15 October to 15 May annually, although it may close earlier depending on weather conditions.

== Location ==
Mu Ko Surin National Park in overview PARO 5 (Nakhon Si Thammarat)

13) Mu Ko Surin National Park in overview PARO 5

	National park
1	Ao Phang Nga
2	Hat Chao Mai
3	Hat Khanom-Mu Ko Thale Tai
4	Hat Noppharat Thara– Mu Ko Phi Phi
5	Khao Lak-Lam Ru
6	Khao Lampi-Hat Thai Mueang
7	Khao Luang
8	Khao Nan
9	Khao Phanom Bencha
10	Mu Ko Lanta
11	Mu Ko Phetra
12	Mu Ko Similan
13	Mu Ko Surin
14	Namtok Si Khit
15	Namtok Yong
16	Si Phang Nga
17	Sirinat
18	Tarutao
19	Thale Ban
20	Than Bok Khorani

	Wildlife sanctuary
21	Kathun
22	Khao Pra–Bang Khram
23	Khlong Phraya
24	Namtok Song Phraek

	Non-hunting area
25	Bo Lo
26	Khao Nam Phrai
27	Khao Phra Thaeo
28	Khao Pra–Bang Khram
29	Khlong Lam Chan
30	Laem Talumpuk
31	Ko Libong
32	Nong Plak Phraya– Khao Raya Bangsa
33	Thung Thale
	Forest park
34	Bo Namrong Kantang
35	Namtok Phan
36	Namtok Raman
37	Namtok Thara Sawan
38	Sa Nang Manora

== Flora and fauna ==
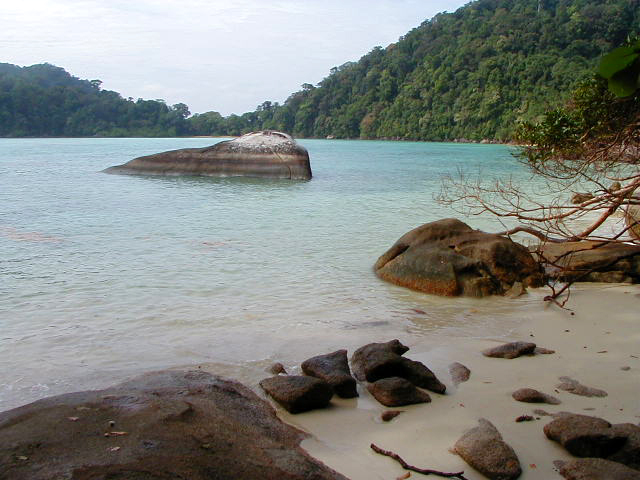
Bay of Ko Surin Nuea

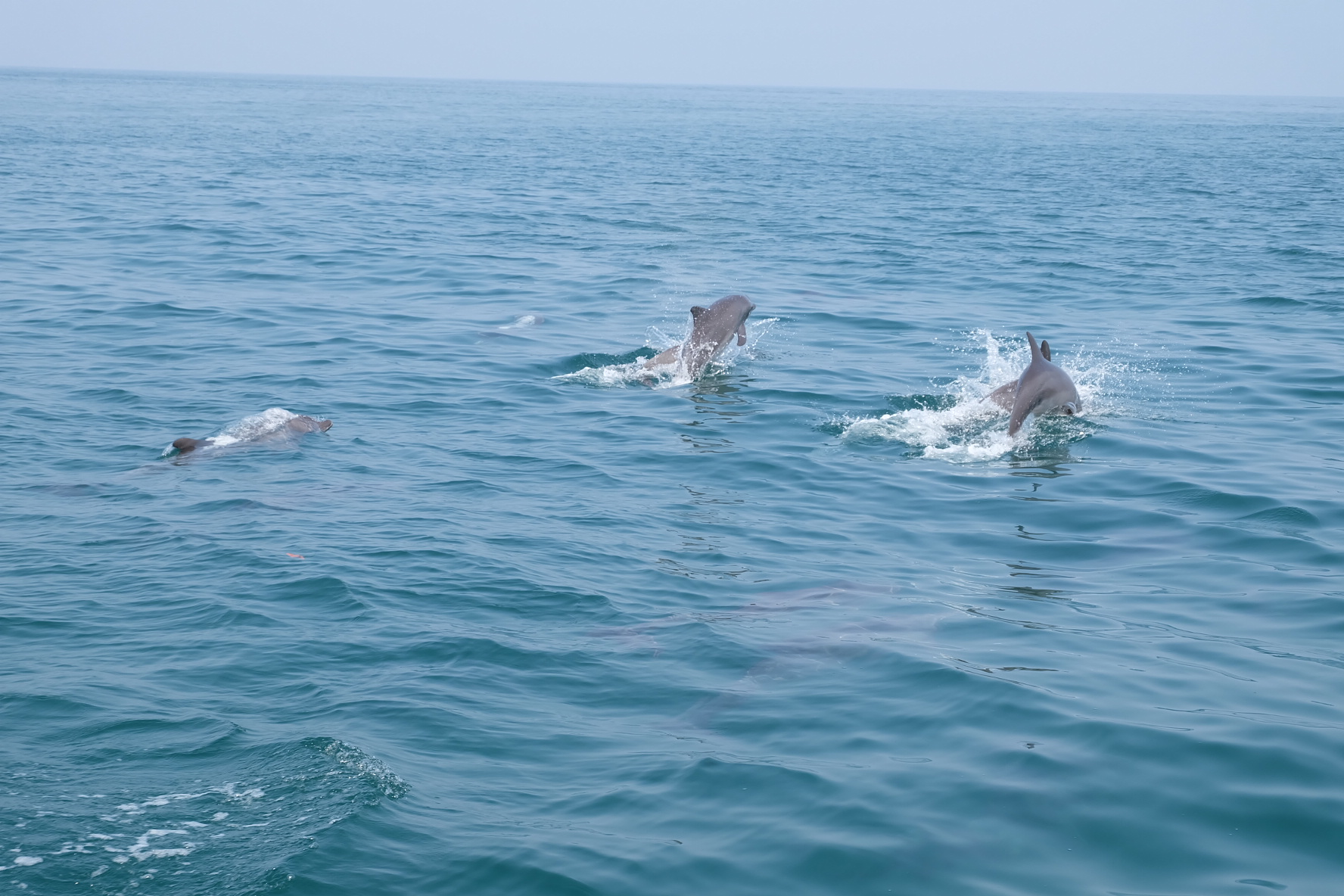
Dolphins off the islands

Mu Ko Surin National Park features a diverse range of ecosystems, with primary rainforests forming the majority of its terrestrial landscape. The park's beach areas are characterized by beach forests, where species such as Barringtonia and Cerbera odollam are prevalent. Additionally, mangrove forests are found in the park's mudflats and brackish waters, particularly in Mae Yai Bay.

Ecological surveys of the park have identified a rich biodiversity:

- The park is home to 91 types of birds, comprising 57 local species and numerous migrating species.
- Mammalian life includes 22 species, with 12 types of bats noted.
- Marine mammals such as Bryde's whales have been observed within the park's waters.
- Reptilian fauna includes seven species, among them Asian water monitors, Clouded monitors, skinks, reticulated pythons, and the Surin bent-toed gecko, a species endemic to the area.
- Sea turtles still nest on the Surin islands, with two species coming ashore to lay their eggs, critically endangered hawksbill and green turtles. In the early-1990s some rare olive ridley turtles were spotted.

BirdLife International has designated Mu Ko Surin National Park as an Important Bird Area (IBA). This designation is due to the park's support of several bird species of conservation concern. These include the near-threatened Nicobar pigeon and Beach stone-curlew, the vulnerable Large green pigeon, and various nationally threatened or near-threatened species in Thailand, such as the Green imperial pigeon, Pied imperial pigeon, and Orange-breasted green pigeon.

== Recreational diving ==
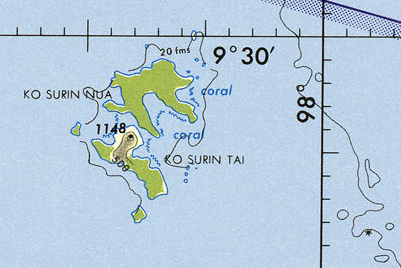
✱ Richelieu Rock in the lower right corner of the map

More than 260 species of reef fish, 68 species of coral, 48 species of nudibranch, and 31 species of shrimp were recorded in the national park.

The best time for diving is from December to April with dry conditions, minimum wind and an average water temperature at around 29 °C (84 °F). All dive sites are only accessible by boat. While sightings of large pelagic species like manta ray and whale shark are rare, February to April is the best time to spot them. Due to marine conservation initiatives, diving is not allowed in certain areas of the national park.

Popular dive sites
Name	Type	Coordinate	Average depth
Richelieu Rock	reef	9°21′48″N 98°1′19″E	20 m (66 ft)
Ko Khai	slope	9°22′16″N 97°52′13″E	15 m (49 ft)
Pak Kaad	night	9°22′47″N 97°52′40″E	10 m (33 ft)
Turtle Ridge	slope	9°23′21″N 97°52′55″E	15 m (49 ft)
Prebens Platon	reef	9°23′22″N 97°49′22″E	20 m (66 ft)
Suthep Bay	slope	9°24′55″N 97°50′56″E	15 m (49 ft)
Ko Glang	slope	9°25′5″N 97°49′44″E	15 m (49 ft)
Hin Kong	rocky islet	9°25′40″N 97°53′15″E	10 m (33 ft)
Ko Chi	slope	9°28′23″N 97°54′16″E	15 m (49 ft)

Richelieu Rock is a solitary limestone pinnacle standing from around 30 to 35 m (98 to 115 ft) depth with its peak right below the sea surface at low tide and home to some of the largest marine life species in Thailand.

== 2004 tsunami ==
=== Tourists ===
The tsunami caught tourists unaware at the Surin Islands and dragged them out towards the sea.

=== Moken ===
Oral tradition played a crucial role in their survival during the 2004 tsunami that affected the villages in Ko Surin Nuea and Ko Surin Tai. According to these oral traditions, when the villagers observed the sea receding unusually from the beaches, they recognized it as a precursor to a tsunami, a phenomenon encoded in their lore through the legend of the laboon or giant wave. This legend passed down through generations, teaches that a tsunami typically arrives as a series of waves and that an abnormally rapid retreat of the sea, followed by an incoming white breaker, is indicative of an imminent laboon, even in the absence of other warning signs like wind changes or shifts in the sky.

Forewarned by this knowledge, the entire Moken population on these islands was able to move to higher ground for safety. Those who were conducting snorkeling tours with tourists took immediate action to steer their boats away from the shore, thus avoiding the impact of the waves. Despite these precautionary measures, the tsunami resulted in the destruction of their homes and other belongings. Only about half of their boats survived the disaster. In the aftermath, the community rebuilt and consolidated into a single village named Ao Bon Yai in Ko Surin Tai.

== See also ==
- List of islands of Thailand
- List of national parks of Thailand
- DNP - Mu Ko Surin National Park
- List of Protected Areas Regional Offices of Thailand
