= Khura Buri district =

Khura Buri คุระบุรี
- District
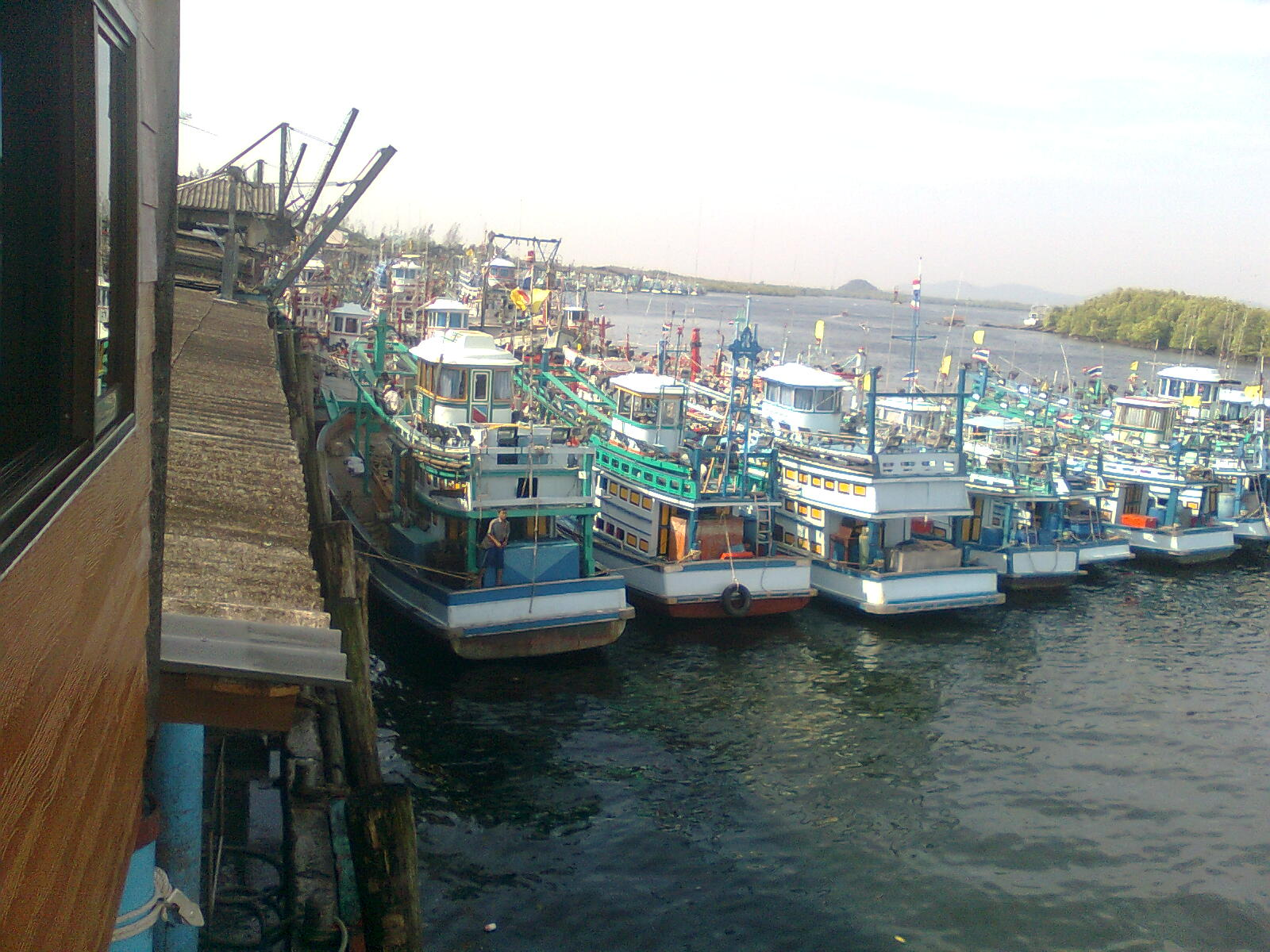
- Boats at Khura

- District location in Phang Nga province
- Coordinates: 9°11′38″N 98°24′54″E
- Country: Thailand
- Province: Phang Nga
- Seat: Khura

Area
  - Total: 797.1 km^{2} (307.8 sq mi)

Population (2005)
  - Total: 23,308
  - Density: 29.2/km^{2} (76/sq mi)
- Time zone: UTC+7 (ICT)
- Postal code: 82150
- Geocode: 8206

Khura Buri (Thai: คุระบุรี) is a district (amphoe) in Phang Nga province in the south of Thailand.

== Geography ==
The district is located along the coast of the Andaman Sea and represents the northernmost district of Phang Nga Province. It shares borders with several neighboring districts, which include Suk Samran of Ranong Province to the north and Ban Ta Khun and Phanom of Surat Thani Province. To its south lies the district of Takua Pa.

Adjacent to the south of the district is Si Phang-nga National Park. Notable offshore areas within proximity include the Similan Islands and the Surin Islands. Additionally, the district encompasses the Mu Ko Ra-Ko Phra Thong National Park, which includes the Ra and Phra Thong Islands.

== History ==
The district, initially known as Mueang Takua Pa District, was once the capital district of Takua Pa province. In 1913, following the relocation of the provincial hall to the current town of Takua Pa, the district was renamed Ko Kho Khao, aligning with the name of its central tambon. However, this change was short-lived, as the district was renamed Pak Nam in the following year, a designation that lasted until 1917. Subsequently, the district was downgraded to a minor district (king amphoe) on 1 September 1938. A significant administrative change occurred in 1964 when the district office moved to tambon Khura, leading to the renaming of the district to Khura Buri in 1968. Khura Buri was then elevated back to full district (amphoe) status on 8 August 1975.

Further administrative restructuring took place on 28 December 1988 when Tambon Ko Kho Khao was transferred to Takua Pa District.

Khura Buri District, and in particular the area of Ko Phra Thong, has been referenced in reports as a critical entry point into Thailand for trafficked individuals from various backgrounds, including Rohingya, Uighur, and Syrian refugees.

== Administration ==
Khura Buri district is divided into four sub-districts (tambons), which are further subdivided into 33 villages (mubans). Khura Buri itself has township (thesaban tambon) status and covers parts of tambons Khura and Mae Nang Khao. Each of the tambons is administered by a tambon administrative organization (TAO).

No.	Name	Thai name	Villages	Pop.
1.	Khura	คุระ	12	11,572
2.	Bang Wan	บางวัน	9	6,717
3.	Ko Phra Thong	เกาะพระทอง	4	998
5.	Mae Nang Khao	แม่นางขาว	8	4,021

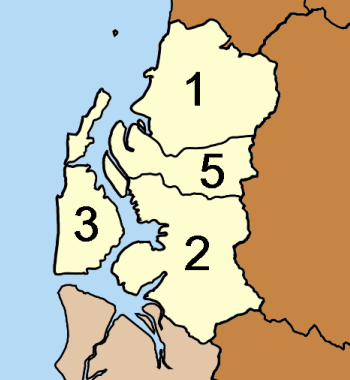

The missing number 4 was assigned to tambon Ko Kho Khao, which was transferred to Takua Pa District.
