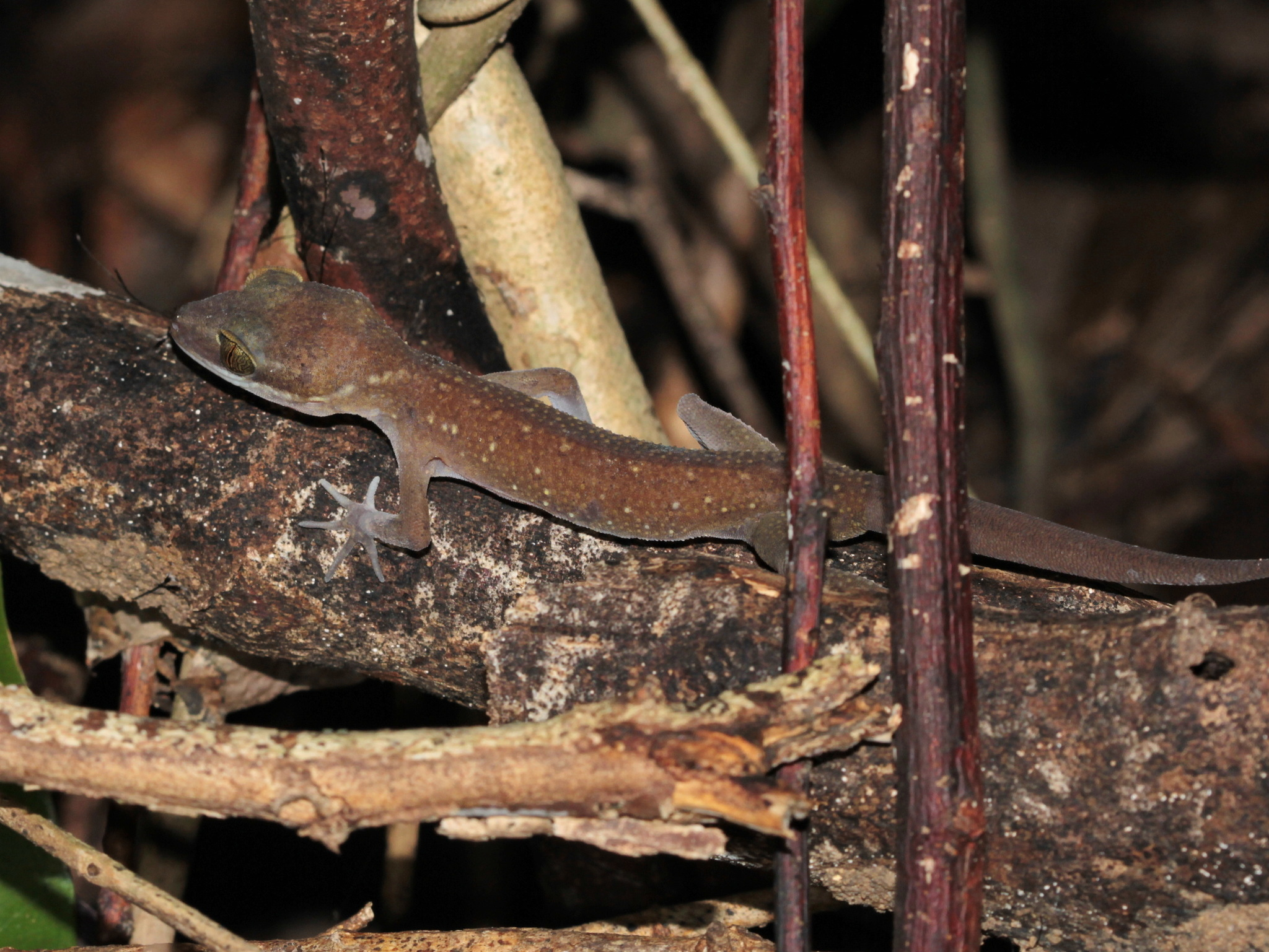

Scientific classification
- Domain: Eukaryota
- Kingdom: Animalia
- Phylum: Chordata
- Class: Reptilia
- Order: Squamata
- Infraorder: Gekkota
- Family: Gekkonidae
- Genus: Cyrtodactylus
- Species: C. surin

Binomial name
- Cyrtodactylus surin Chan-ard & Makchai, 2011

= Cyrtodactylus surin =

Species of lizard

Cyrtodactylus surin is a species of gecko that is endemic to the Surin Islands in Thailand.
