= Richelieu Rock =

Dive site in Thailand in the Andaman Sea

Coordinates: 9°21′48″N 98°1′19″E

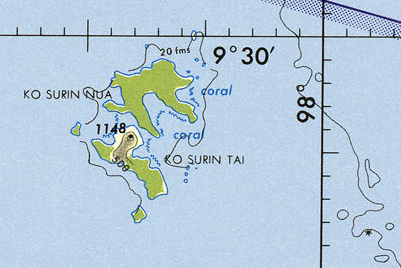
✱ Richelieu Rock in the lower right corner

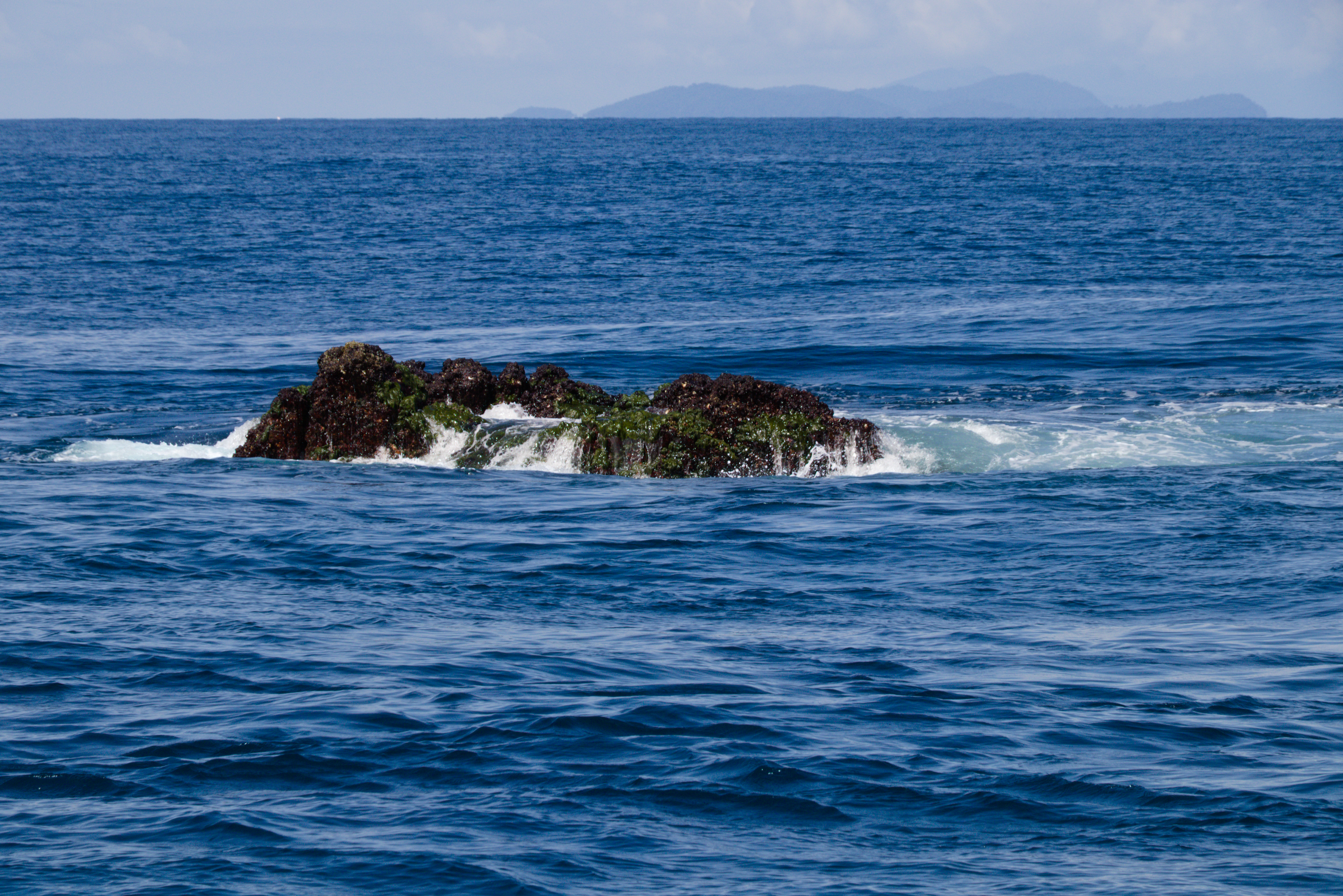
The top of Richelieu Rock at low tide

Richelieu Rock (called Hin Plo Naam in Thai) is a dive site in Thailand in the Andaman Sea about 45 kilometres (28 mi) from the mainland. It is part of the Mu Ko Surin National Park although being about 18 km (11 mi) east of Ko Surin Tai. There are no islands in the immediate vicinity of the reef.

The limestone pinnacle rises from the sea floor of about 30 to 35 m (98 to 115 ft) above the surface at low tide. The horseshoe-shaped reef is known for its purple corals as well as diverse marine life ranging from small fish and harlequin shrimp to large pelagics like whale shark and manta ray.

== Discovery and name ==
It was named after Admiral Richelieu, a commander in the Royal Thai Navy, supported by the existence of official Navy maps mentioning Richelieu Rock from the early 1900s. Richelieu was the first person to complete a hydrographic survey of the Andaman Sea including the area in question. Some – falsely – state that Richelieu Rock was discovered as a recreational diving site by diving pioneer, Jacques-Yves Cousteau, with the help of local fishermen and was named by him after the red colour of Cardinal Richelieu's robe due to the red to purple colours of the soft corals on the reef. However, on his Andaman expedition in 1989 he came only as far north as Koh Bon in the Similan Islands whilst waiting a permit for Myanmar (which was never granted).

== Marine life ==
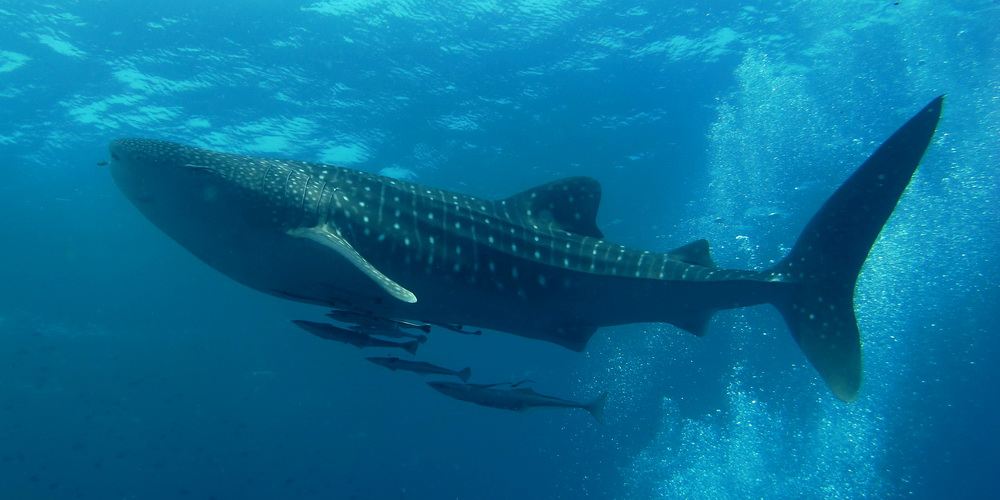
Whale shark

Partly due to its unique geology as a solitary pinnacle standing out from around 30 to 35 m (98 to 115 ft) depth to just under the surface at high tide it attracts a variety of different pelagic species of all different sizes. Reports claim regular appearance of Malabar groupers, bigeye snappers, Bannerfish, lionfish, triggerfishes and shovelnose rays.

While sightings are rare, February to April is the best time to spot large pelagic species like manta rays and whale sharks.

Richelieu Rock is also well known for its large variety of small and rare marine critters, such as sea horses, frogfish, harlequin shrimp, pineapplefish, orang utang crab and several other species of crabs and shrimp.

== Dive site ==
Richelieu Rock is considered to be one of Thailand's most iconic dive sites. It is usually accessed by live-aboard diving boats during cruises, as it is too far off the coast to be reached by usual dive boats, though there are speedboats that can go to Richelieu Rock as a daytrip.

Richelieu Rock is part of the Mu Ko Surin National Park, which is open 15 October to 15 May and may close earlier depending on weather conditions.
