= Khlong Phraya Wildlife Sanctuary =

Wildlife sanctuary in southern Thailand

- IUCN category Ia (strict nature reserve)
- Location within Thailand
- Location: Thailand
- Nearest city: Surat Thani
- Coordinates: 8°25′N 98°58′E
- Area: 153.6 km^{2} (59.3 sq mi)
- Established: 1980
- Governing body: Wildlife Conservation Office

Khlong Phraya (Thai: คลองพระยา) is a wildlife sanctuary in southern Thailand, at the boundary of Surat Thani and Krabi Provinces.

== History ==
The wildlife preserve was established on 31 October 1980, originally covering 95 km² (59,375 rai) of Krabi Province. On 7 May 1993 it was enlarged by 58.6 km² (36,613 rai) to include parts of Surat Thani Province as well.

== Geography ==
It covers an area of 153.6 km² (95,988 rai) of the districts Plai Phraya, Phrasaeng, and Chai Buri. The terrain is mostly mountainous and covered with dense forests, but also some grassland.

== Fauna ==
Animals in the area are langurs, muntjac, tapirs and hornbills.

== Location ==
Khlong Phraya Wildlife Sanctuary in overview PARO 5 (Nakhon Si Thammarat)

23) Khlong Phraya Wildlife Sanctuary in overview PARO 5

	National park
3	Hat Khanom-Mu Ko Thale Tai
4	Hat Noppharat Thara-Mu Ko Phi Phi
7	Khao Luang
8	Khao Nan
9	Khao Phanom Bencha
14	Namtok Si Khit
15	Namtok Yong

	Wildlife sanctuary
21	Kathun
23	Khlong Phraya

	Non-hunting area
25	Bo Lo
30	Laem Talumpuk

== See also ==
- DNP - Khlong Phraya Wildlife Sanctuary
- PARO 5 (Nakhon Si Thammarat)
