= Namtok Yong National Park =

National park in Thailand

- IUCN category II (national park)
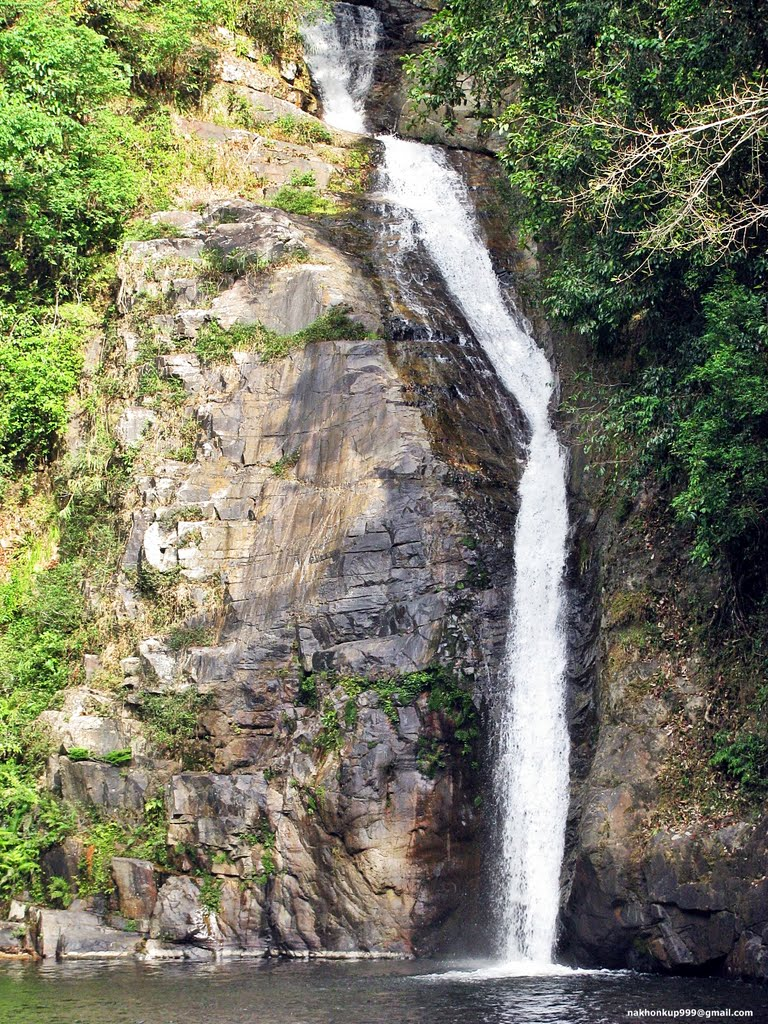
- Namtok Yong

- Park location in Thailand
- Location: Thailand
- Nearest city: Nakhon Si Thammarat
- Coordinates: 8.1725°N 99.7424°E
- Area: 210 km^{2} (81 sq mi)
- Established: 1991
- Governing body: Department of National Parks, Wildlife and Plant Conservation

Namtok Yong National Park is a national park in Nakhon Si Thammarat province, Thailand. The park is home to waterfalls and tropical forests.

== Geography ==
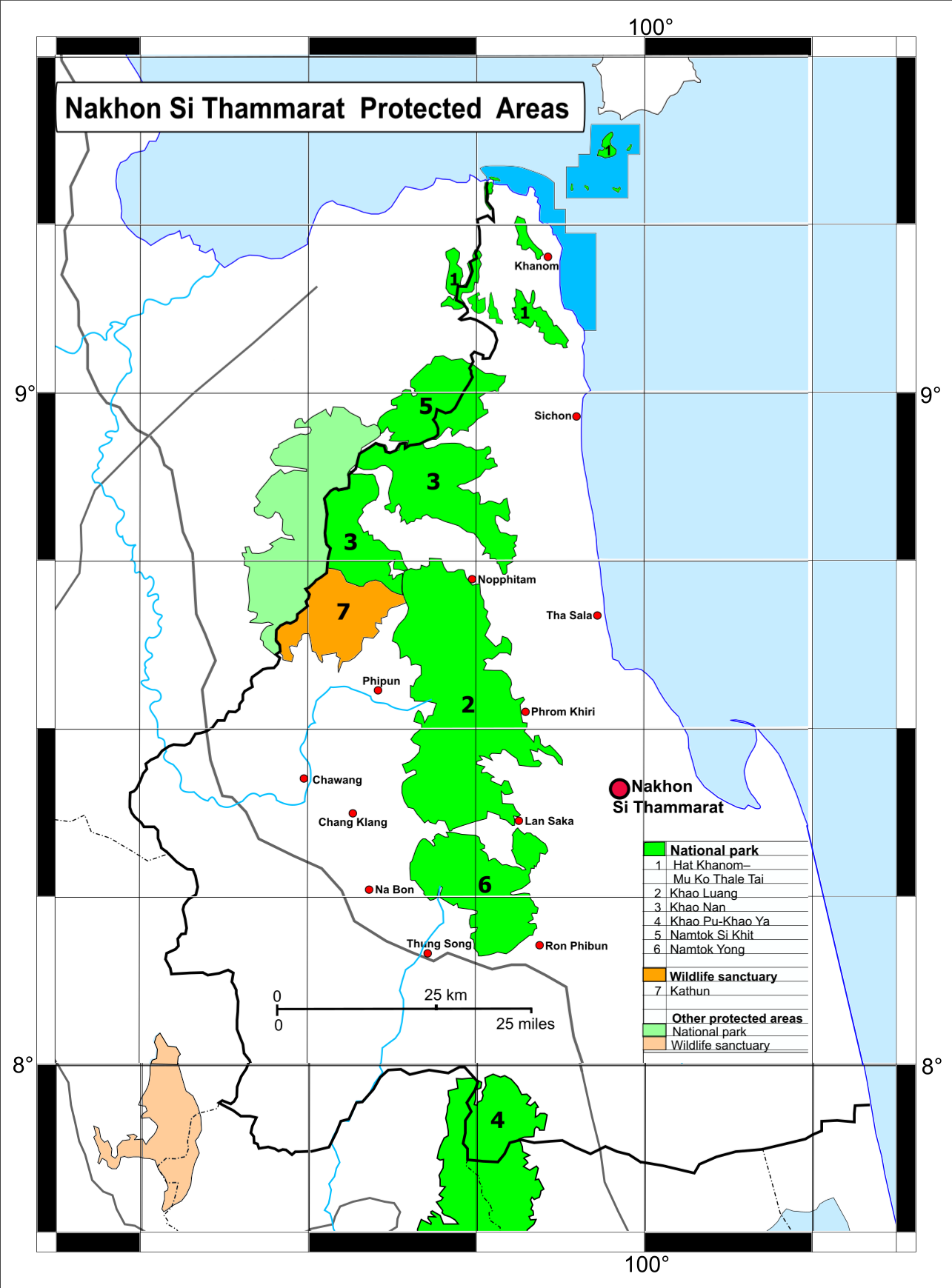
Protected areas of Nakhon Si Thammarat province

Namtok Yong National Park is in the Lan Saka, Thung Song, Ron Phibun, Chang Klang and Na Bon districts of Nakhon Si Thammarat province. It is about 55 km (30 mi) from Nakhon Si Thammarat. The park's area is 210 km^{2} (81 sq mi).

The park's average elevation is 600 m (2,000 ft), the highest mountain is Khao Men at 1,307 m (4,288 ft). Other mountains include Khao Thong; Khao Wang Hip; Khao Phra and Khao Luang.

== Attractions ==
The park's highest waterfall is Plio Waterfall with seven tiers up to 25 m (80 ft) high and 18 m (60 ft) wide. Other park waterfalls include Nan Plio Waterfall, with three tiers each up to 20 m (66 ft) high. The park namesake Yong Waterfall is 15 m (50 ft) high.

== Flora and fauna ==
Plant species in the park include Dipterocarpus alatus, Hopea odorata, Cinnamomum porrectum, Artocarpus rigidus, Payena acuminata, Sandoricum koetjape, Parkia timoriana, Intsia palembanica and the endangered Anisoptera costata.

The park hosts animals including serow, muntjac, mouse deer, gibbon, palm civet and the endangered otter civet. Birds in the park include great argus, red-whiskered bulbul, white-rumped shama, red junglefowl, dark-throated oriole and green pigeon. The park's waters are home to species such as fire eel, giant snakehead and waterfall crab.
