= Thale Ban National Park =

National park in Thailand

- IUCN category II (national park)
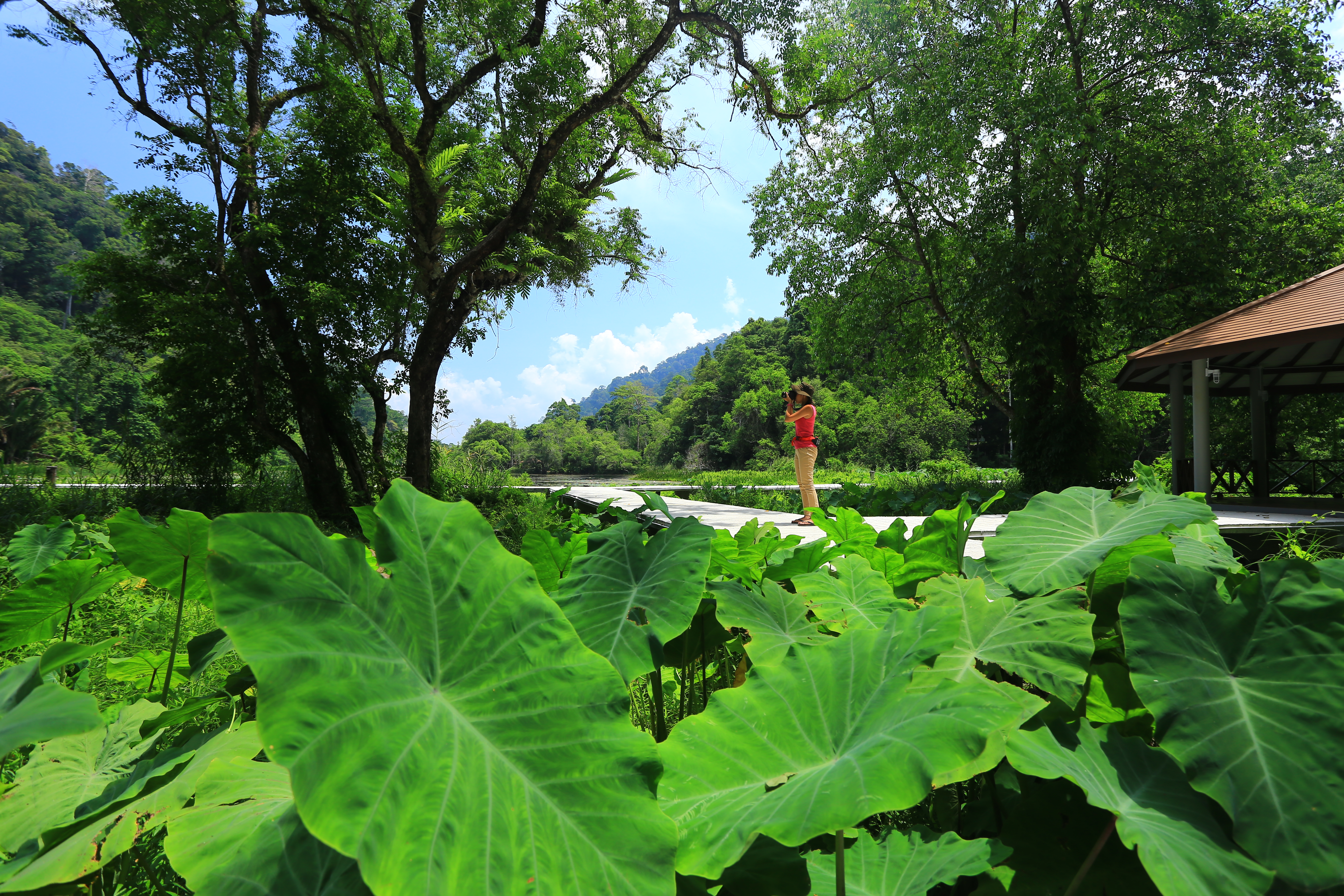

- Location within Thailand
- Location: Satun Province, Thailand
- Nearest city: Satun
- Coordinates: 6°28′22″N 100°8′2″E
- Area: 196 km^{2} (76 sq mi)
- Established: 27 October 1980
- Visitors: 11,996 (in 2019)
- Governing body: Department of National Parks, Wildlife and Plant Conservation

Thale Ban National Park (Thai: ทะเลบัน) is a forested area south of the Banthat Mountains in southern Thailand, in the south of Satun Province bordering Malaysia; it borders Taman Negeri Perlis park. The park was established on 27 October 1980. It covers an area of 122,500 rai ~ 196 square kilometres (76 sq mi) of Khuan Don and Mueang Satun districts.

The nearest town to the park is Satun, west of the park and approximately 30 km (20 mi) southwest of park headquarters.

== Geography ==
The park is located around a valley which formed the historic link between Thailand and Malaysia. According to local lore, 300 years ago an earthquake formed the lake in the valley, probably due to a landslide which created a natural dam. Submerged trees found in the lake seem to confirm this story.

The limestone hills contain several caves. Tham Ton Din is a river cave near park headquarters. The highest elevation within the park is Chin Mountain with an elevation of 756 metres (2,480 feet).

== Flora and fauna ==
The park features forest types including tropical rain forest, mixed deciduous forest and coastal mangrove forests. The rain forest is home to species of Dipterocarpus, Hopea, Shorea, Parashorea, Alstonia, Caryota and Calamus. The deciduous forest, unusual in southern Thailand, has species of Caryota, Lagerstroemia, Pterocymbium, Vitex, Schima and Dillenia. The coastal forest is home to mangrove species such as Rhizophora mucronata, R. apiculata, Bruguiera cylindrica and species of Avicennia.

The park is known to contain 64 mammal species, 282 bird species (including 8 hornbill species), 40 reptile species and 20 amphibian species.

Mammals include the endangered Malayan tapir, threatened Sumatran serow and protected marbled cat. Other mammals include tiger, leopard cat and sun bear. Birds in the park include chestnut-bellied malkoha, orange-breasted trogon, Gould's frogmouth, blue-winged pitta, blue-crowned hanging parrot, white-crowned hornbill, oriental pied hornbill, brown boobook, black-and-red broadbill, Asian green broadbill, banded broadbill and hill myna. Reptiles include the common house gecko, large forest gecko, reticulated python, king cobra, soft-shelled turtle and the endangered sunburst turtle.

== Location ==
Thale Ban National Park in overview PARO 5 (Nakhon Si Thammarat)

19) Thale Ban National Park in overview PARO 5

	National park
1	Ao Phang Nga
2	Hat Chao Mai
3	Hat Khanom– Mu Ko Thale Tai
4	Hat Noppharat Thara– Mu Ko Phi Phi
5	Khao Lak–Lam Ru
6	Khao Lampi– Hat Thai Mueang
7	Khao Luang
8	Khao Nan
9	Khao Phanom Bencha
10	Mu Ko Lanta
11	Mu Ko Phetra
12	Mu Ko Similan
13	Mu Ko Surin
14	Namtok Si Khit
15	Namtok Yong
16	Si Phang Nga
17	Sirinat
18	Tarutao
19	Thale Ban
20	Than Bok Khorani

	Wildlife sanctuary
21	Kathun
22	Khao Pra–Bang Khram
23	Khlong Phraya
24	Namtok Song Phraek

	Non-hunting area
25	Bo Lo
26	Khao Nam Phrai
27	Khao Phra Thaeo
28	Khao Pra–Bang Khram
29	Khlong Lam Chan
30	Laem Talumpuk
31	Mu Ko Libong
32	Nong Plak Phraya– Khao Raya Bangsa
33	Thung Thale
	Forest park
34	Bo Namrong Kantang
35	Namtok Phan
36	Namtok Raman
37	Namtok Thara Sawan
38	Sa Nang Manora

== See also ==
- List of national parks of Thailand
- DNP - Thale Ban National Park
- List of Protected Areas Regional Offices of Thailand
