= Ko Libong =

Island belonging to Thailand

Native name: เกาะลิบง
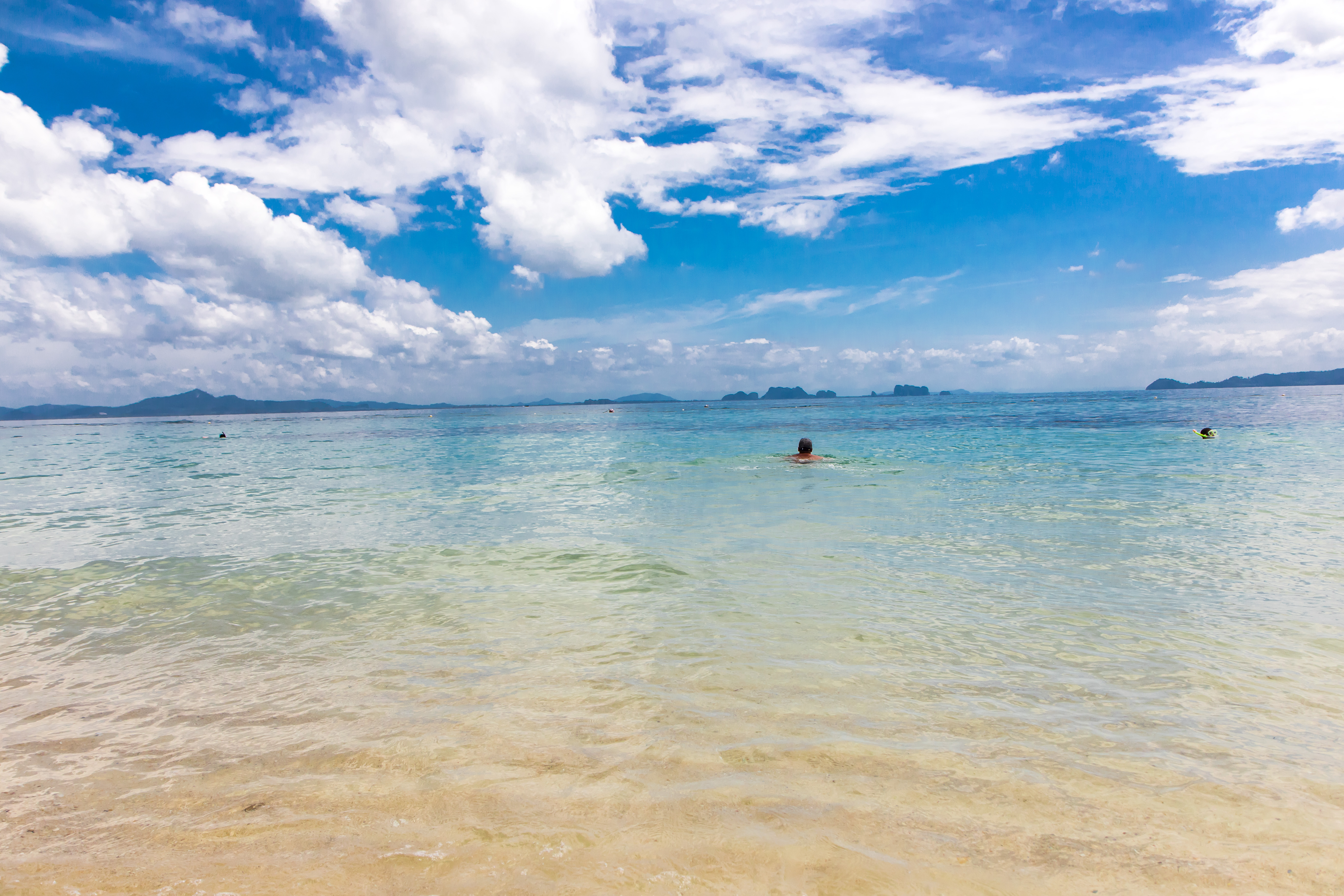
- Shallow sea, Ko Libong
- Interactive map of Ko Libong

Geography
- Location: Strait of Malacca
- Coordinates: 7°14′50″N 99°23′32″E
- Archipelago: Libong Islands
- Area: 33.50 km^{2} (12.93 sq mi)

Administration
- Thailand
- Province: Trang
- District: Kantang
- Tambon: Ko Libong

Demographics
- Population: 3500 (2012)
- Languages: Thai, Southern Thai

Additional information
- Time zone: ICT (UTC+7)
- Postal code: 92110

Ko Libong (เกาะลิบง) is one of 550 islands in the Andaman Sea. Lying off the coast of Thailand, it is a part of an eponymous sub-district of Kantang District, Trang Province, which also includes several other islands of the Libong Archipelago and a small section of the shoreline near Kantang.

== Geography ==
Ko Libong, Trang's largest island, is 30 minutes by long-tail boat from Hat Yao Ban Chao Mai Pier. Less visited than neighbouring isles, Ko Libong is known for its flora and fauna as much as for its beaches. The island is home to a small Muslim fishing community and has a few resorts on its west coast beaches.
In 1979, Mu Ko Libong Non-hunting Area was established, with a land/water area of 447 square kilometres (173 sq mi).

=== Environment ===
On the east coast of Ko Libong at Laem Ju Hoi is a large area of mangroves protected by the Botanical Department as the Libong Islands Wildlife Reserve.

==== Dugongs ====
Ko Libong's sea channels have sea grass, a favorite food of the rare dugong, making the Libong Wildlife Sanctuary one of the last habitats of the species. Around 180 of the creatures survive there.

Two hundred dugongs are believed to still exist in Thai waters as of 2019, 180 of them off Ko Libong. Dugongs are listed in Thailand's Wild Animal Reservation and Protection Act as one of 19 protected wild species in Thailand. Their presence is due to the more than 12,000 rai of seagrass meadows surrounding Libong. Seagrass is the dugong's favourite food and 11 of the 13 species of seagrasses in Thailand are found at Ko Libong.

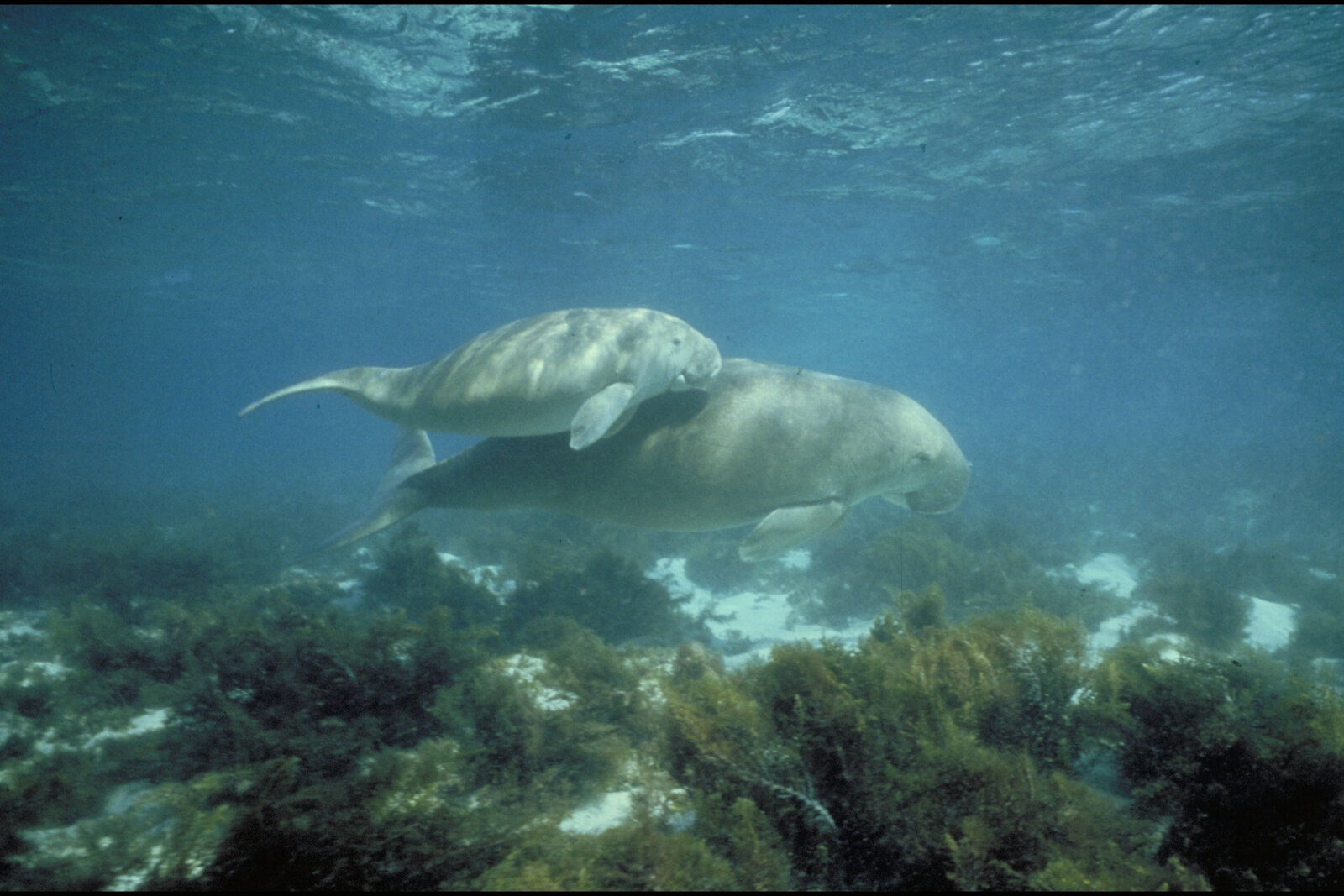
Dugong mother and calf

The leading causes of dugong deaths are fishing equipment and boat collisions. In the first nine months of 2019, 21 dugongs have died. Among them was an infant dugong that died from eating plastic waste, which led to severe gastritis and blood infection. The dugong losses are exacerbated by their low birth rate; they cannot be bred in captivity.

Ko Libong inhabitants have united to create a preservation zone for dugongs where fishing and navigation are limited. Residents monitor compliance from a watchtower on the island. They also scour the seagrass meadows for plastic debris. Ko Libong's program will later be expanded to 11 other dugong habitats, including Ko Phra Thong, areas in the Prasae River delta, and Bandon Bay. Ko Libong was named an ASEAN Heritage Park at the 15th ASEAN Ministerial Meeting on the Environment in October 2019.

==== Birds ====
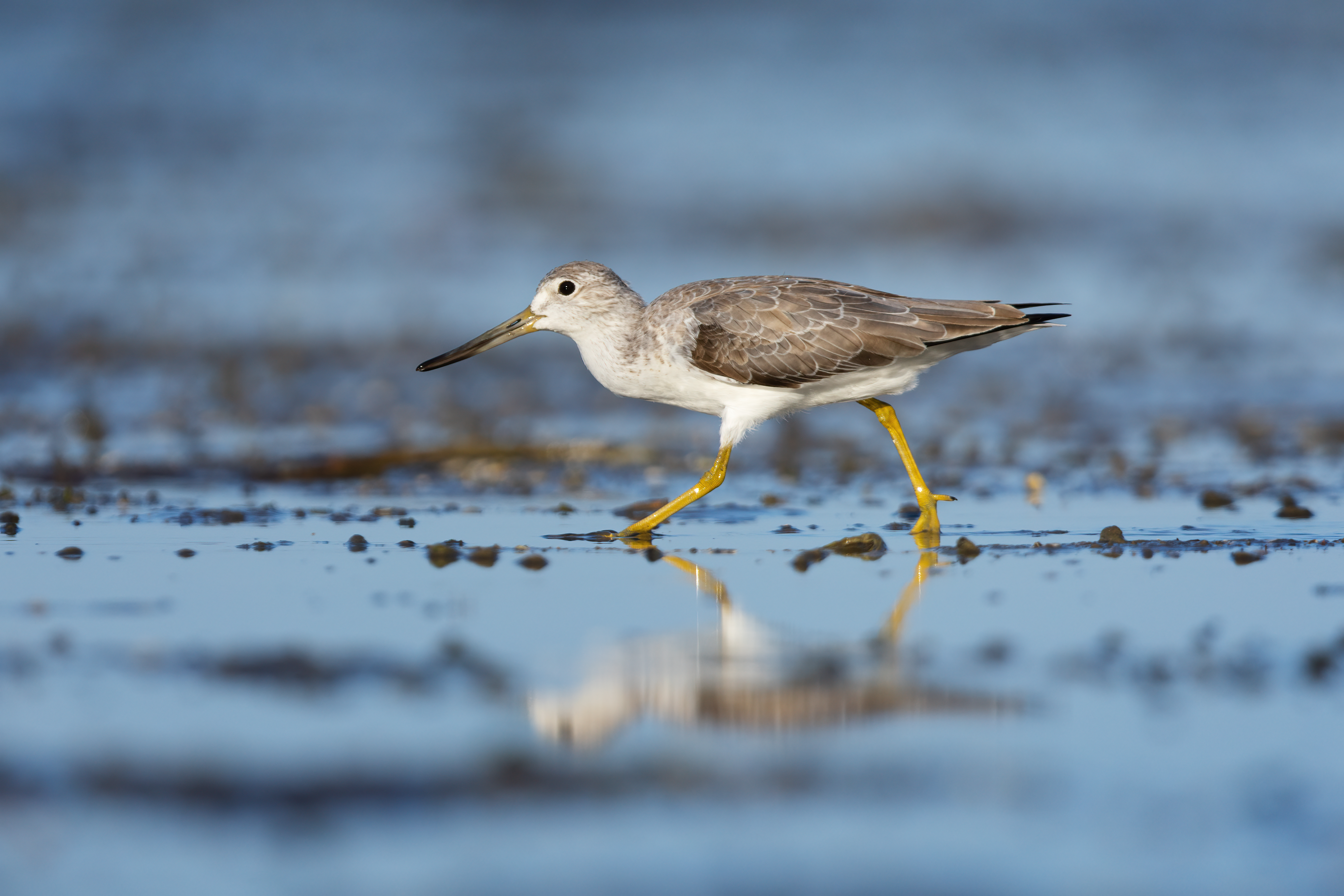
Spotted greenshank

The island has been designated an Important Bird Area (IBA) by BirdLife International because it supports a significant wintering population of spotted greenshanks.

Harvesting the nests of swiftlets has been a money-making activity for Ko Libong residents for hundreds of years. Ko Libong no longer has swiftlet nests, but collectors seek them on other islands in the Trang Sea, on Ko Muk, Ko Petra, and Ko Laolieng or in neighbouring provinces like Phatthalung, Krabi, and Phang Nga. The nests are harvested three times a year, in February, April, and July–August. Each job takes about seven to eight days. When harvesting nests for the third time, harvesters wait until the chicks have flown away.

== Libong Islands ==
There are a total of 6 islands in the Libong archipelago including the main island Ko Libong.

Nr	Island	Area (km^{2})	Population (Note: The island's area and population data retrieved from the 2012 census)
1	Ko Libong	33.500	3500 (Note: Population data)
2	Ko Muk	7.633	2000
3	Ko Rok Noi	2.146	0
4	Ko Rok Yai	1.846	0
5	Ko Kradan	1.668	400
6	Ko Waen	0.159	0
Total		46.952	5900

== Location ==
Mu Ko Libong Non-hunting Area in overview PARO 5 (Nakhon Si Thammarat)

31) Mu Ko Libong Non-hunting Area in overview PARO 5

	National park
1	Ao Phang Nga
2	Hat Chao Mai
3	Hat Khanom– Mu Ko Thale Tai
4	Hat Noppharat Thara– Mu Ko Phi Phi
5	Khao Lak–Lam Ru
6	Khao Lampi– Hat Thai Mueang
7	Khao Luang
8	Khao Nan
9	Khao Phanom Bencha
10	Mu Ko Lanta
11	Mu Ko Phetra
12	Mu Ko Similan
13	Mu Ko Surin
14	Namtok Si Khit
15	Namtok Yong
16	Si Phang Nga
17	Sirinat
18	Tarutao
19	Thale Ban
20	Than Bok Khorani

	Wildlife sanctuary
21	Kathun
22	Khao Pra–Bang Khram
23	Khlong Phraya
24	Namtok Song Phraek

	Non-hunting area
25	Bo Lo
26	Khao Nam Phrai
27	Khao Phra Thaeo
28	Khao Pra–Bang Khram
29	Khlong Lam Chan
30	Laem Talumpuk
31	Mu Ko Libong
32	Nong Plak Phraya– Khao Raya Bangsa
33	Thung Thale
	Forest park
34	Bo Namrong Kantang
35	Namtok Phan
36	Namtok Raman
37	Namtok Thara Sawan
38	Sa Nang Manora

== See also ==
- Indian Ocean
- Trang Province
- Outline of Thailand
- List of islands of Thailand
