= Khao Lak–Lam Ru National Park =

National park in Thailand

- อุทยานแห่งชาติเขาหลัก–ลำรู่
- IUCN category II (national park)
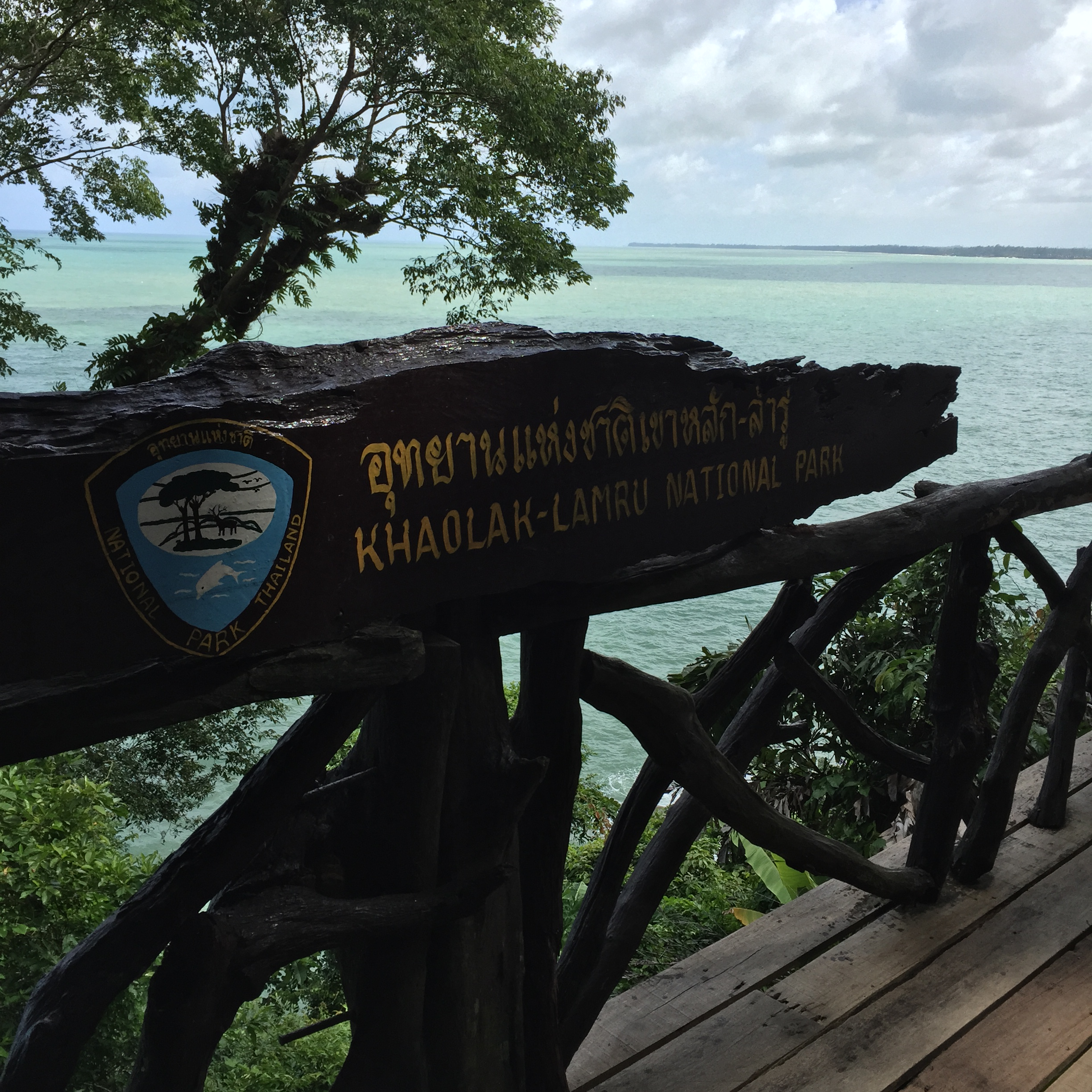

- Location within Thailand
- Location: Phang Nga Province, Thailand
- Nearest city: Takua Pa
- Coordinates: 8°41′54″N 98°16′49″E
- Area: 125 km^{2} (48 sq mi)
- Established: Aug 1991
- Visitors: 72,162 (in 2019)
- Governing body: Department of National Parks, Wildlife and Plant Conservation

Khao Lak–Lam Ru National Park (Thai: อุทยานแห่งชาติเขาหลัก–ลำรู่) is a national park in Phang Nga Province, Thailand. The park is named for two of its mountain peaks, Khao Lak and Lam Ru. It also encompasses beaches and forests.

== Geography ==
Khao Lak–Lam Ru National Park is 115 kilometres (71 mi) north of Phuket city and 30 km (19 mi) south of Takua Pa. The coastal area here is typically referred to as "Khao Lak". The park is just off Route 4 (Phetkasem Road).

Khao Lak–Lam Ru park covers parts of four districts: Kapong, Mueang Phang Nga, Takua Pa, and Thai Mueang. The park's area is 78,125 rai ~ 125 square kilometres (48 sq mi) and its highest peak is 1,077 metres (3,530 ft).

== History ==
Originally the park was a seashore park, but in 1984 it was extended to encompass the forested and mountainous area inland and for protection of the province's main drainage basin. On 30 August 1991, Khao Lak–Lam Ru became Thailand's 66th national park.

The December 2004 Indian Ocean tsunami caused high casualties in Khao Lak. Due to its location and shoreline terrain, the area suffered the worst of any area in Thailand, with over 4,000 deaths.

== Attractions ==
The park has numerous large waterfalls, the largest of which is Lam Ru Waterfall, a waterfall of 5 levels and year-round water flow. Other waterfalls include Lam Phrao, Hin Lat, and Ton Chong Fa. The coastal park section at Khao Lak sea shore offers very clear waters and clean, quiet stretches of beach.

== Flora and fauna ==
The park's forest is tropical evergreen forest, including such tree species as takian, Dipterocarpus, Alstonia scholaris, Magnolia champaca, and Anisoptera costata. Palms, bamboo, and epiphytes such as orchids and ferns grow widely throughout.

Nearer the seashore, species such as cashew trees, Barringtonia asiatica, and Pandanus fascicularis (screw pine) flourish.

Smaller mammal species include colugo, binturong, and Malayan weasel. Other animals include banded surili, tiger, Asian tapir, serow, sambar, Asiatic black bear, black giant squirrel, southern red muntjac, common treeshrew, chevrotain, gibbon and wild boar. The park is home to various reptile species including Bengal monitor and Malayan pit viper.

Bird species in the park include crested serpent eagle, white-bellied sea eagle, emerald dove, scarlet minivet, bushy-crested hornbill, and oriental pied hornbill. Other birds include great argus, streaked bulbul, maroon woodpecker, red junglefowl, ashy drongo, common myna, and barbet.

== Gallery ==
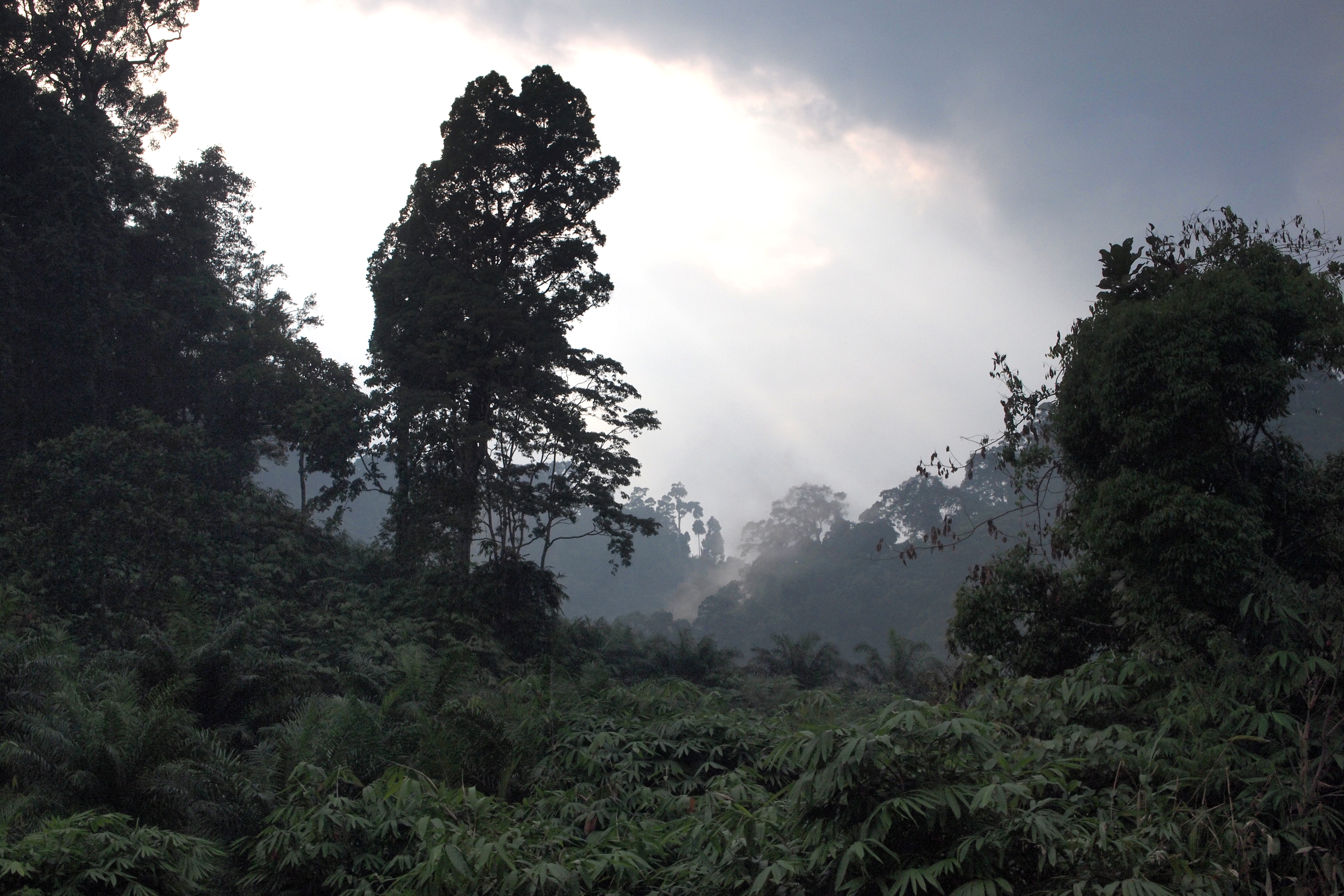
Wilderness of Khao Lak-Lam Ru forest

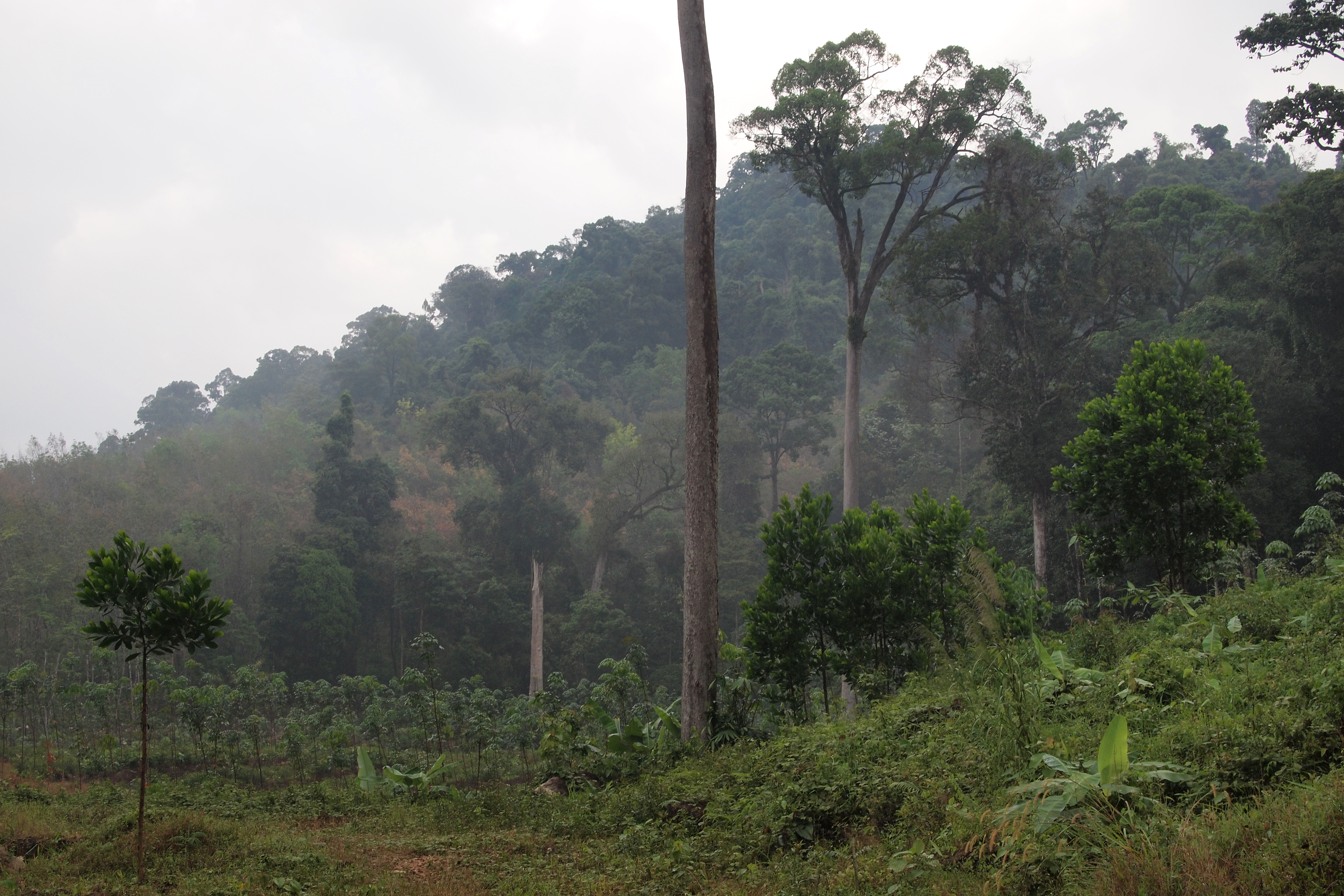
Jungle

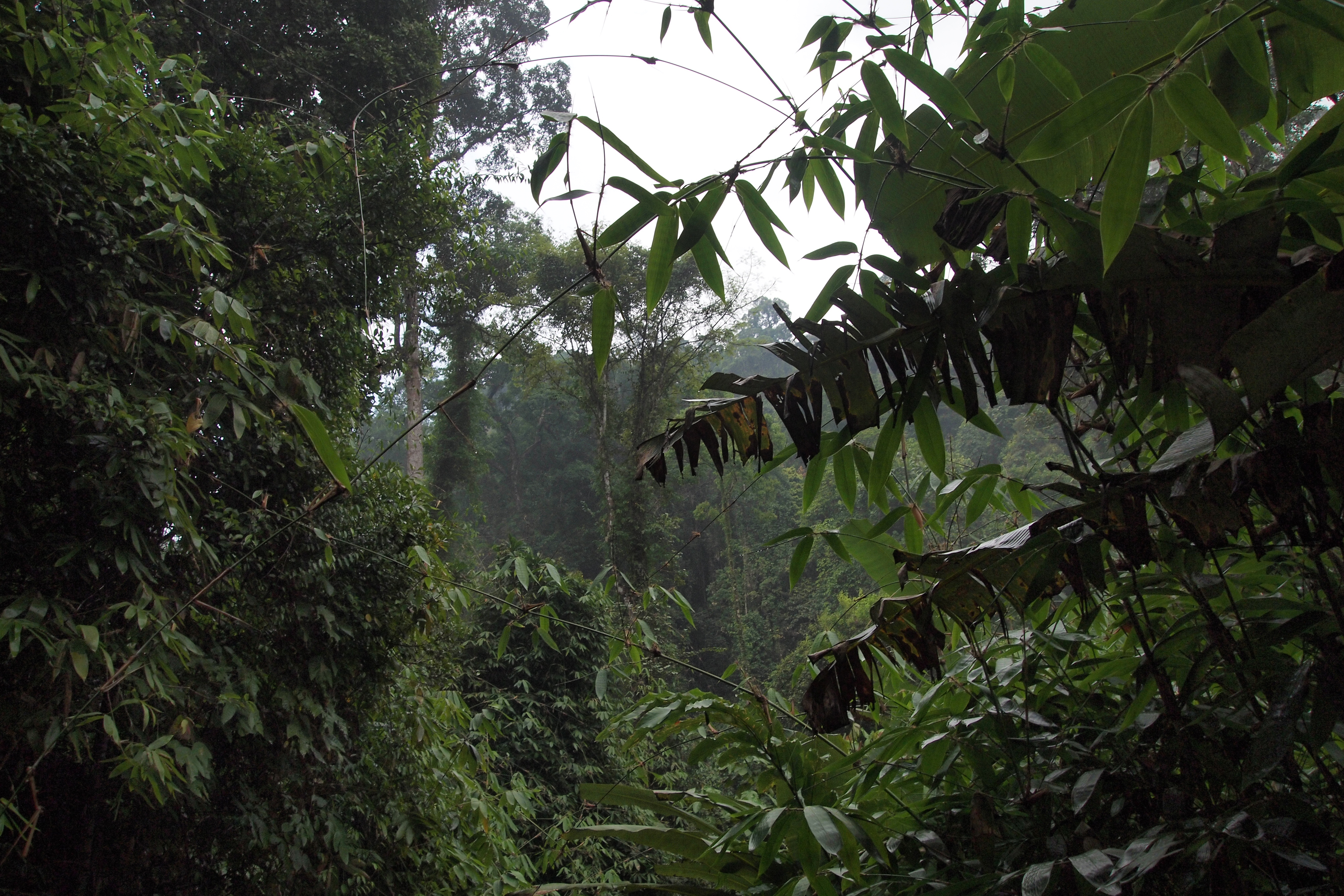
Evergreen rainforest

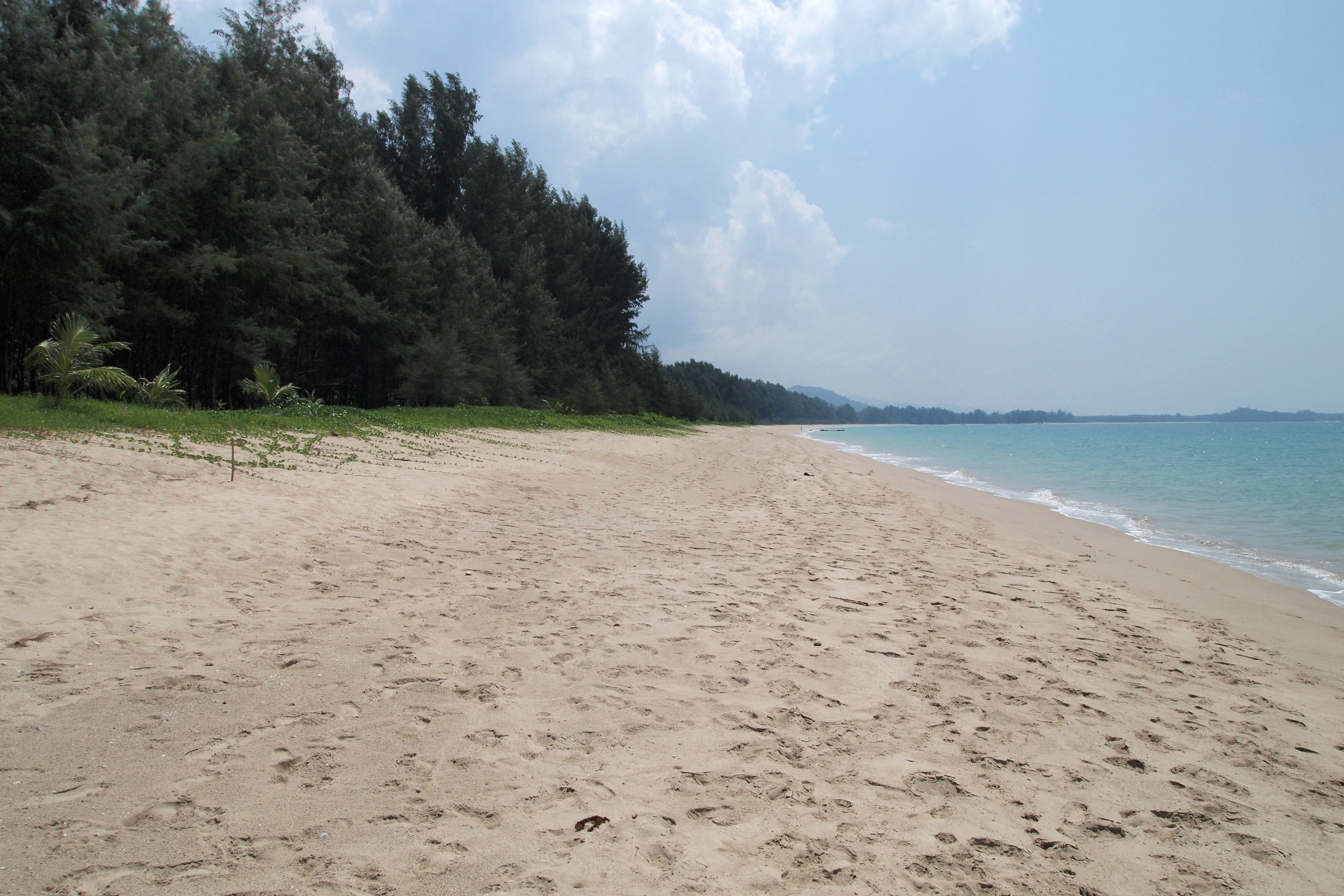
Khao Lak Beach

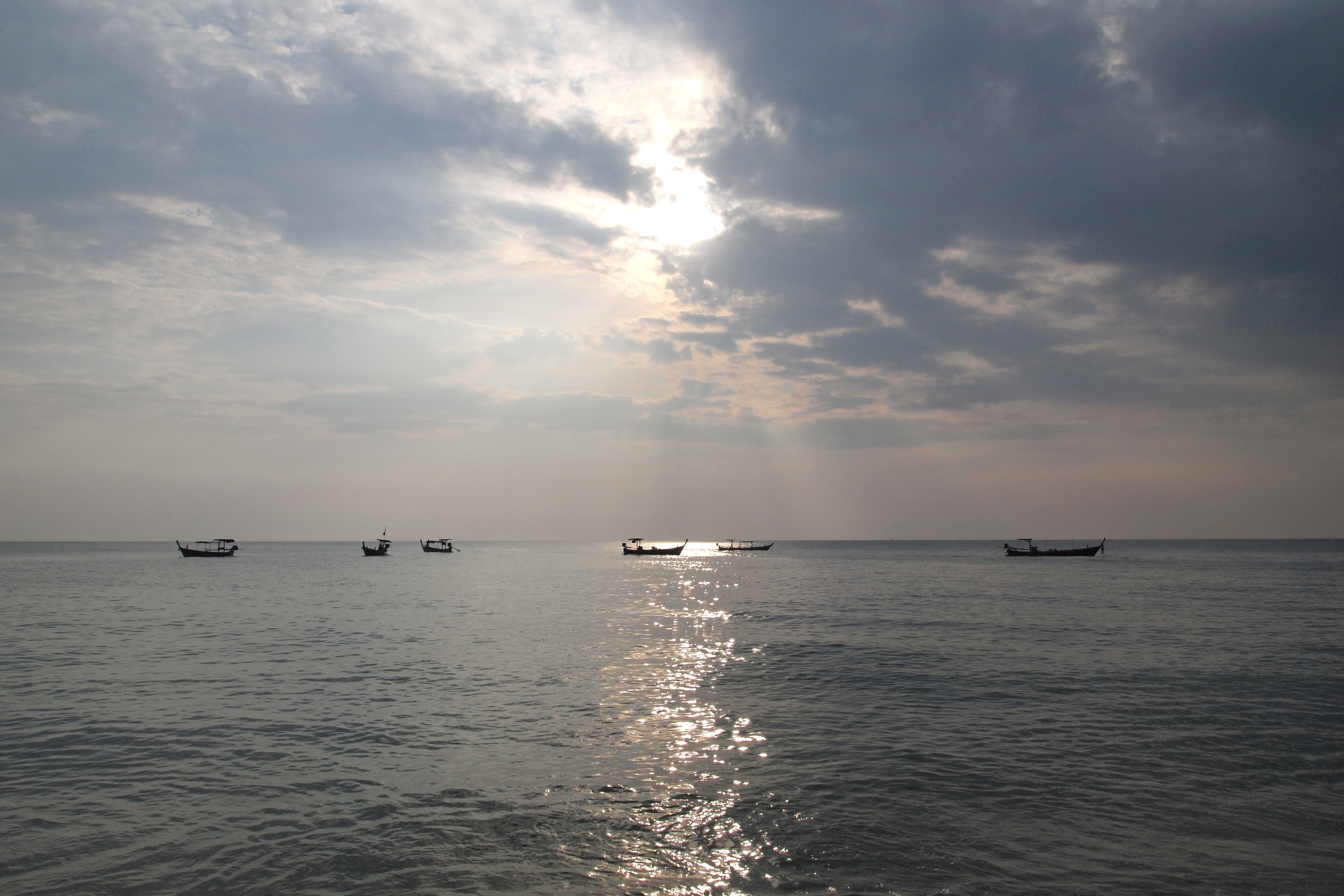
Andaman Sea, Khao Lak

== Location ==
Khao Lak-Lam Ru National Park in overview PARO 5 (Nakhon Si Thammarat)

5) Khao Lak-Lam Ru National Park in overview PARO 5

	National park
1	Ao Phang Nga
2	Hat Chao Mai
3	Hat Khanom-Mu Ko Thale Tai
4	Hat Noppharat Thara– Mu Ko Phi Phi
5	Khao Lak–Lam Ru
6	Khao Lampi–Hat Thai Mueang
7	Khao Luang
8	Khao Nan
9	Khao Phanom Bencha
10	Mu Ko Lanta
11	Mu Ko Phetra
12	Mu Ko Similan
13	Mu Ko Surin
14	Namtok Si Khit
15	Namtok Yong
16	Si Phang Nga
17	Sirinat
18	Tarutao
19	Thale Ban
20	Than Bok Khorani

	Wildlife sanctuary
21	Kathun
22	Khao Pra–Bang Khram
23	Khlong Phraya
24	Namtok Song Phraek

	Non-hunting area
25	Bo Lo
26	Khao Nam Phrai
27	Khao Phra Thaeo
28	Khao Pra–Bang Khram
29	Khlong Lam Chan
30	Laem Talumpuk
31	Ko Libong
32	Nong Plak Phraya– Khao Raya Bangsa
33	Thung Thale
	Forest park
34	Bo Namrong Kantang
35	Namtok Phan
36	Namtok Raman
37	Namtok Thara Sawan
38	Sa Nang Manora

== See also ==
- List of national parks of Thailand
- DNP - Khao Lak-Lam Ru Mueang National Park
- List of Protected Areas Regional Offices of Thailand
