= Hat Chao Mai National Park =

Marine protected area in Trang Province, Thailand

- IUCN category II (national park)
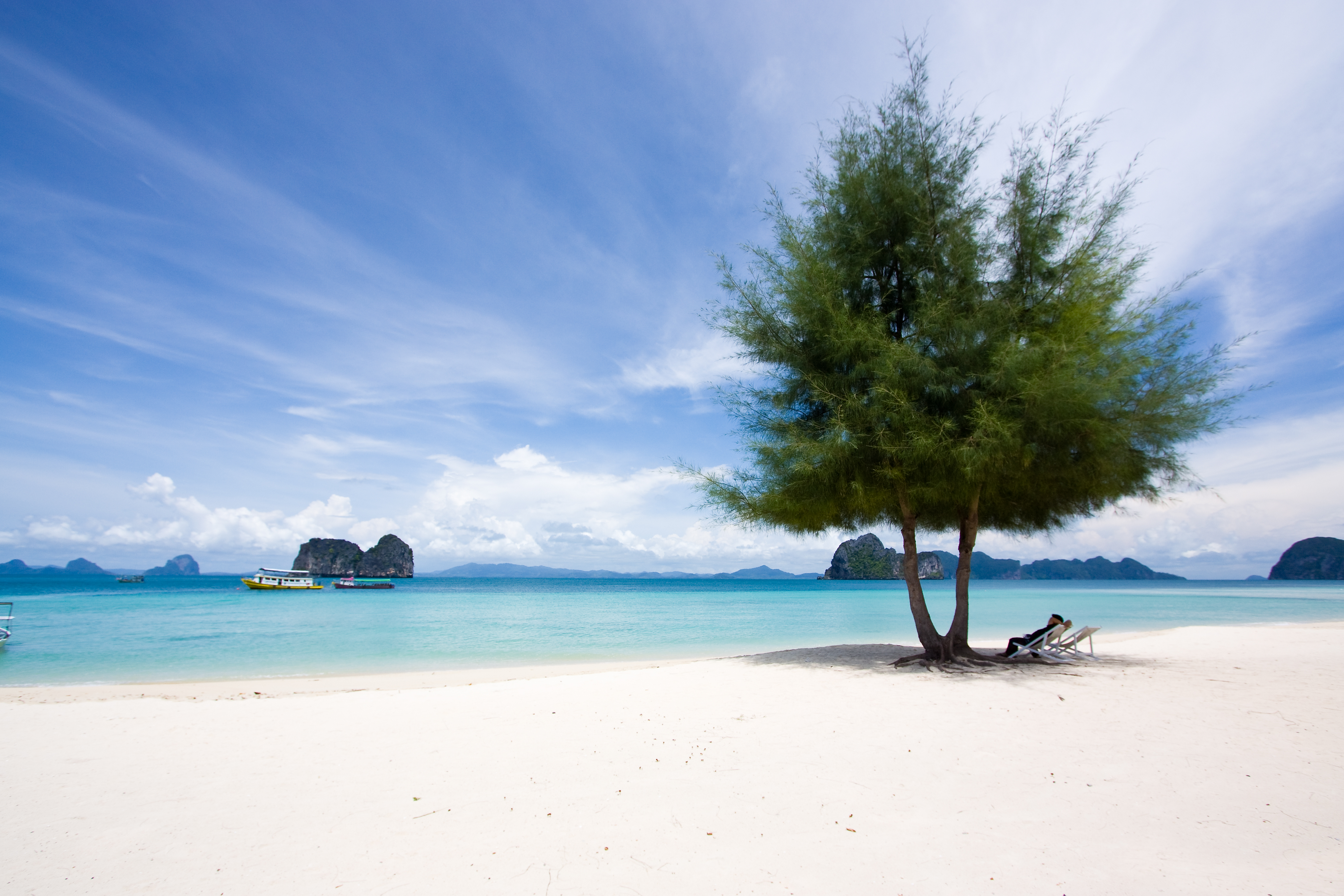

- Location within Thailand
- Location: Sikao and Kantang Districts, Trang Province, Thailand
- Coordinates: 7.397°N 99.33°E
- Area: 231 km^{2} (89 sq mi)
- Established: 1981
- Visitors: 83,023 (in 2019)
- Governing body: Department of National Parks, Wildlife and Plant Conservation

Ramsar Wetland
- Official name: Had Chao Mai Marine National Park - Ta Libong Island Non-Hunting Area - Trang River Estuaries
- Designated: 14 August 2002
- Reference no.: 1182

Hat Chao Mai National Park is a protected area located in the Sikao and Kantang Districts of Trang Province, Thailand. It is a marine national park. Established in 1981, it is an IUCN Category II protected area with coral reefs, and an area measuring 144,292 rai ~ 231 square kilometres (89 sq mi). The park has been designated as a Ramsar site since 2002. It has also been designated an Important Bird Area (IBA) by BirdLife International because it supports a significant population of large green-pigeons.

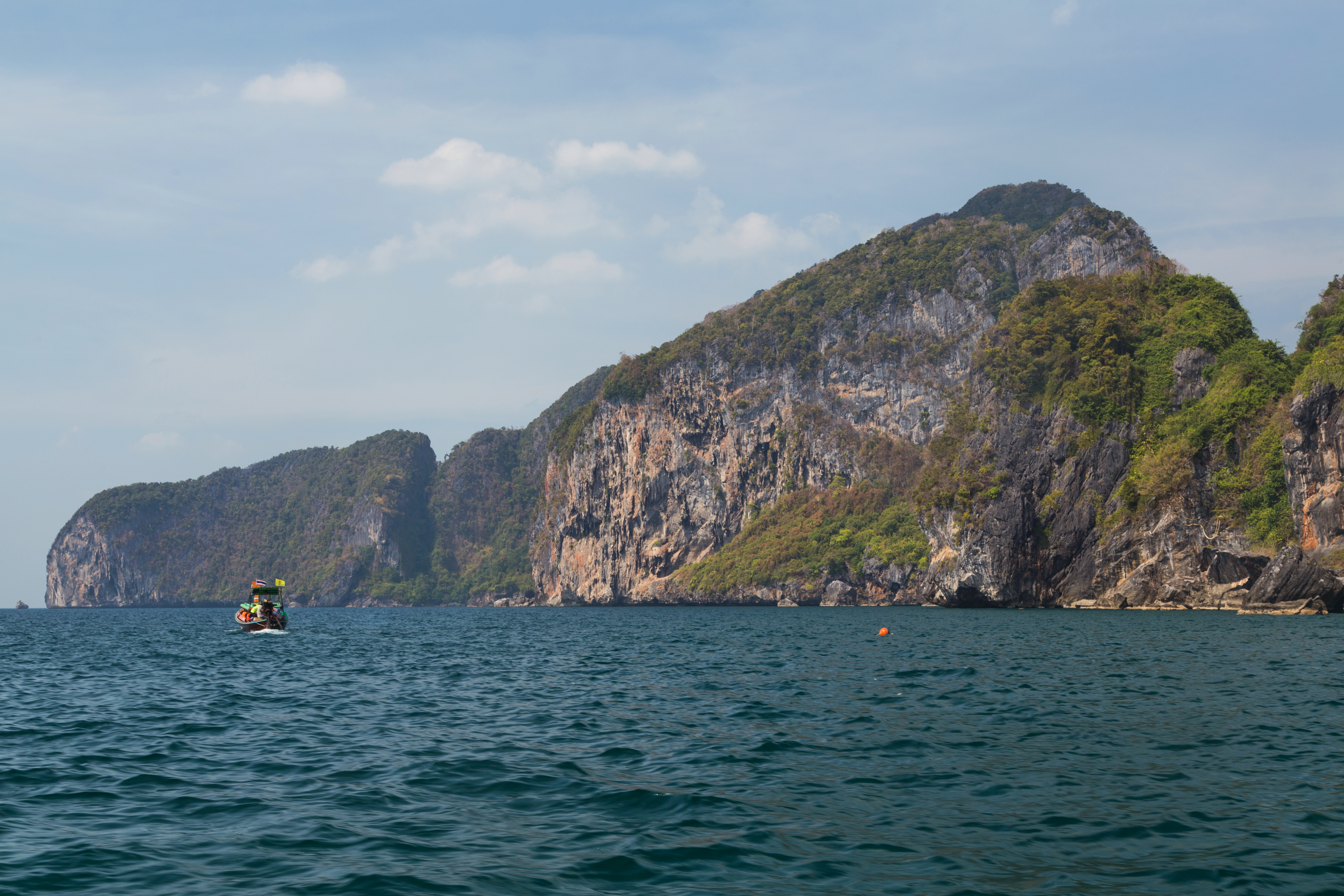
Ko Muk

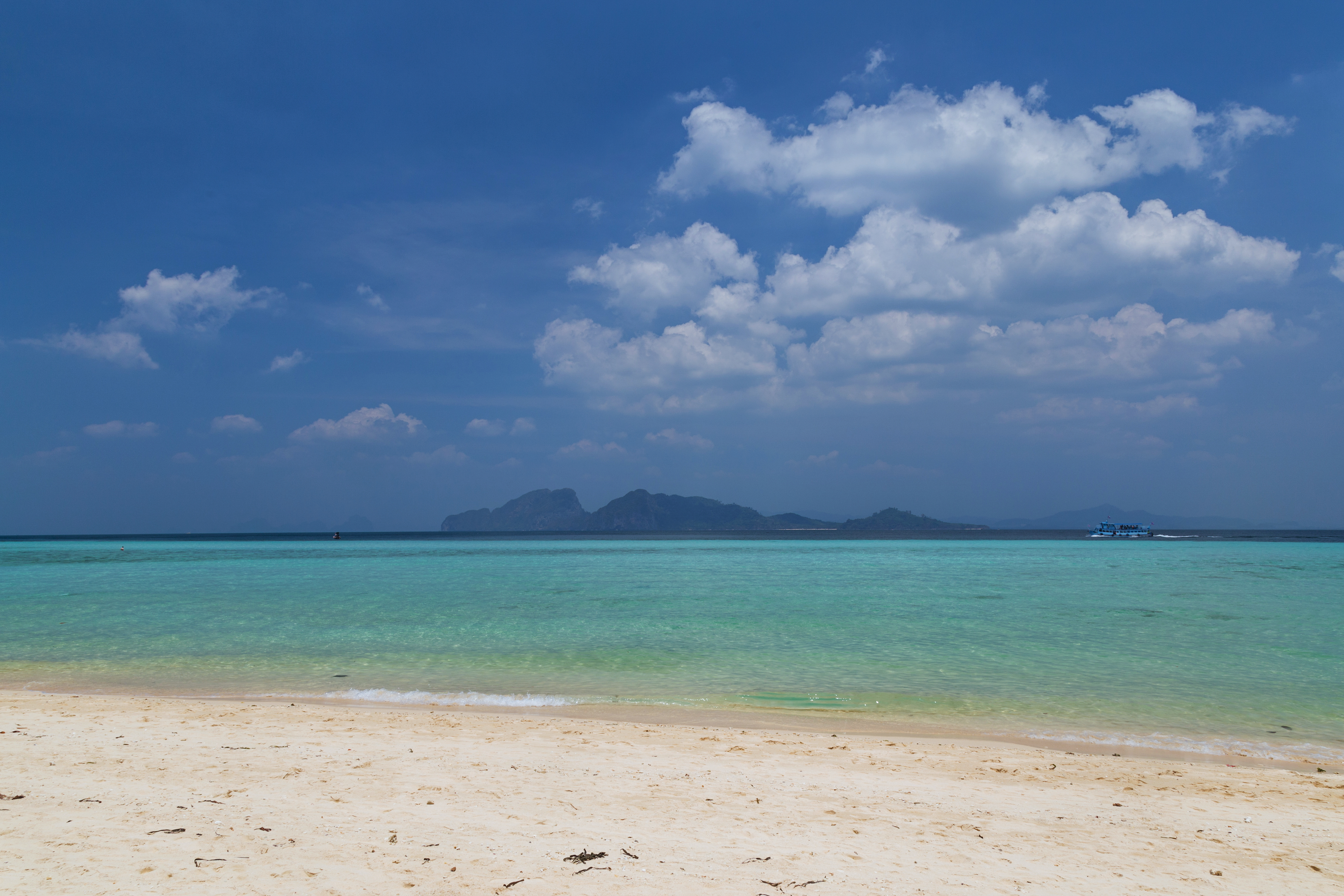
Beach at Ko Kradan

== Location ==
Hat Chao Mai National Park in overview PARO 5 (Nakhon Si Thammarat)

2) Hat Chao Mai National Park in overview PARO 5

	National park
1	Ao Phang Nga
2	Hat Chao Mai
3	Hat Khanom–Mu Ko Thale Tai
4	Hat Noppharat Thara– Mu Ko Phi Phi
5	Khao Lak–Lam Ru
6	Khao Lampi–Hat Thai Mueang
7	Khao Luang
8	Khao Nan
9	Khao Phanom Bencha
10	Mu Ko Lanta
11	Mu Ko Phetra
12	Mu Ko Similan
13	Mu Ko Surin
14	Namtok Si Khit
15	Namtok Yong
16	Si Phang Nga
17	Sirinat
18	Tarutao
19	Thale Ban
20	Than Bok Khorani

	Wildlife sanctuary
21	Kathun
22	Khao Pra–Bang Khram
23	Khlong Phraya
24	Namtok Song Phraek

	Non-hunting area
25	Bo Lo
26	Khao Nam Phrai
27	Khao Phra Thaeo
28	Khao Pra–Bang Khram
29	Khlong Lam Chan
30	Laem Talumpuk
31	Ko Libong
32	Nong Plak Phraya– Khao Raya Bangsa
33	Thung Thale
	Forest park
34	Bo Namrong Kantang
35	Namtok Phan
36	Namtok Raman
37	Namtok Thara Sawan
38	Sa Nang Manora

== See also ==
- List of national parks of Thailand
- DNP - Hat Chao Mai National Park
- List of Protected Areas Regional Offices of Thailand
