= Sirinat National Park =

National park in Phuket Province, Thailand

- อุทยานแห่งชาติสิรินาถ
- IUCN category II (national park)
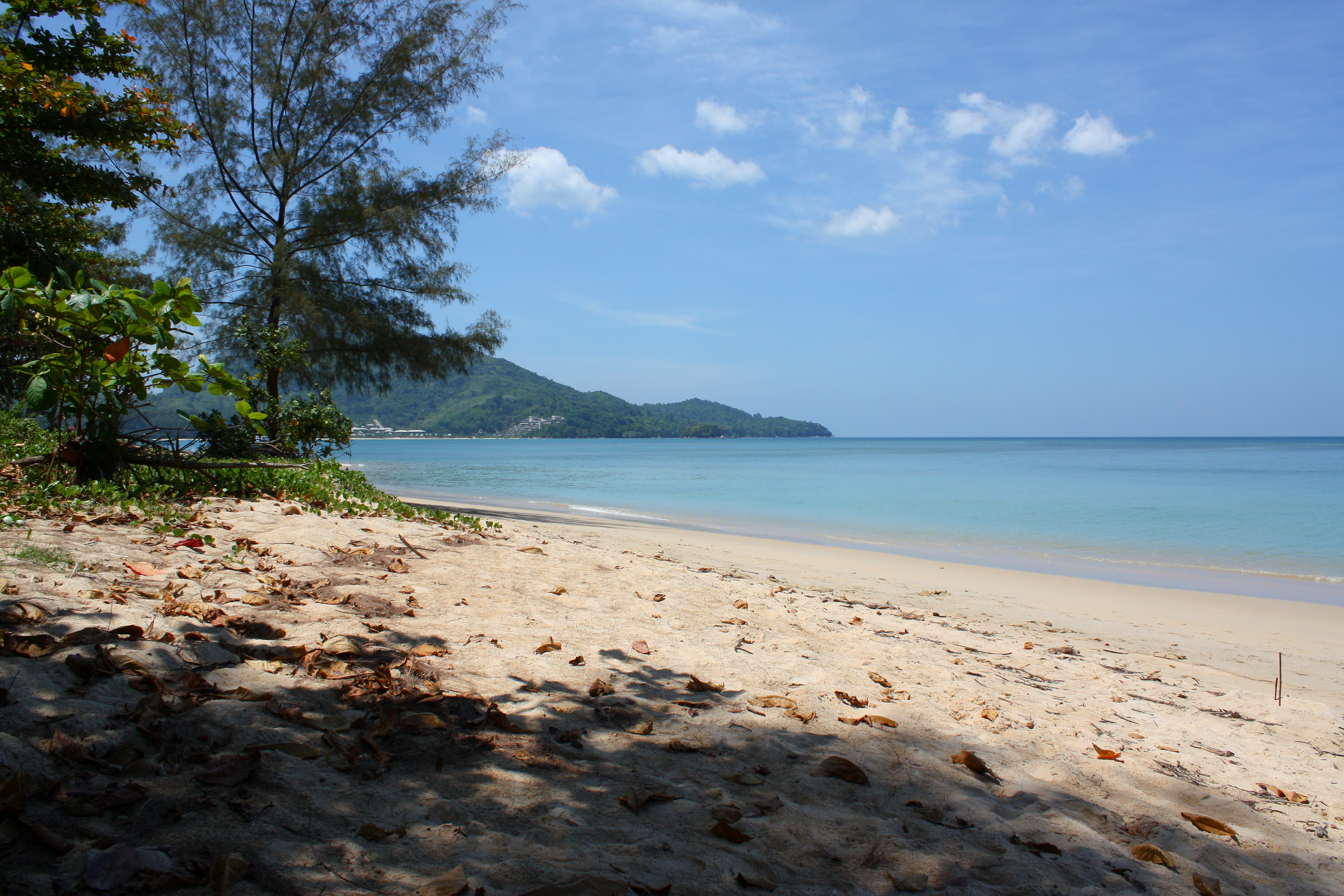
- Hat Nai Yang

- Location within Thailand
- Location: Phuket Province, Thailand
- Nearest city: Phuket
- Coordinates: 8°5′17″N 98°17′46″E
- Area: 90 km^{2} (35 sq mi)
- Established: July 1981
- Visitors: 51,200 (in 2019)
- Governing body: Department of National Parks, Wildlife and Plant Conservation

Sirinat National Park (Thai: อุทยานแห่งชาติสิรินาถ) is a national park in Phuket Province, Thailand. This park, with sections on land and sea, is in the northwest of the island of Phuket.

== Geography ==
Sirinat National Park is in Thalang District, about 30 kilometres (19 mi) north of Phuket town on the coastal section surrounding Phuket International Airport.

The park's total area is 56,250 rai ~ 90 square kilometres (35 sq mi), with 68 square kilometres (26 sq mi) of marine area and 22 square kilometres (8.5 sq mi) land-based. The park includes four main beaches: Hat Nai Thon, Hat Nai Yang, Hat Mai Khao, and Hat Sai Kaeo. Hat Mai Khao is Phuket's longest beach.

== History ==
The park was originally known as Nai Yang National Park and became Thailand's 32nd national park on 13 July 1981. It was renamed Sirinat National Park in 1992.

A 2014 Bangkok Post editorial said that, "The latest questionable development in the sad saga of Sirinat National Park in Phuket province raises serious and vexing issues. Among the most pertinent is the old paradox of "Who will watch the watchers?" The Royal Thai Navy has moved into the precious park on the pretext of providing security. But the threats to this little jewel of national land are not physical, and heavily armed military men provide no solution at all".

In January 2016, it was reported that about 1,200 rai of Sirinat Park land was "detached" from the park by unscrupulous officials and sold to property developers, completed with illegal deeds, for 40 million baht per rai or approximately 50 billion baht in total. "The land had been detached from the national park so investers [sic] could build resorts and several well-known hotels,...", according to Mr Damrong Phidet, a former director-general of the National Parks, Wildlife and Plants Conservation Department.

== Attractions ==
Sirinat National Park is best known for its well-preserved white sand beaches. Also, Hat Mai Khao and Hat Nai Yang are both sea turtle nesting areas. Between November and February sea turtles come to lay eggs on these beaches.

== Flora and fauna ==
The park's beach forests, approximately 2 square kilometres (0.77 sq mi) in area, consist of numerous tree species with the effect of providing a windbreak during tropical storms and stabilising the beach sands. Tree species include common ironwood, tulip tree, tropical almond, white barringtonia, cajeput tree, Alexandrian laurel, screwpine, ashoka tree, black plum, elephant apple and morning glory.

Beach forest birds include magpie-robin, common myna, spotted dove, Asian fairy-bluebird, oriole, greater racket-tailed drongo and some bulbul species.

Sirinat National Park also hosts a small area (1 square kilometre) of mangrove forest, located where freshwater and seawater mix in estuarine areas. Tree species here include red mangrove, white mangrove, black mangrove, cannonball mangrove, looking-glass mangrove and Ceriops. Other plant species include Rhizophora apiculata and Derris trifoliata.

Mangrove forest birds include collared kingfisher, Terek sandpiper, bar-tailed godwit, white-breasted waterhen, slaty-breasted rail, white-bellied sea eagle, brahminy kite and large-billed crow.

The mangrove forest hosts some reptiles such as monitor lizard, mangrove snake and turtle.

Mangrove marine life includes shrimp, mudskipper, mullet, grouper and garfish.

Coral reefs are located in the marine section of the park at a distance of 700 metres (2,300 ft) to 1,000 metres (3,300 ft) offshore. Reef species include plate coral, soft coral, sea fan and sea anemone.

Formerly, leatherback sea turtles laid eggs on a stretch of beach in Sirinat National Park. At the park, 166 eggs were laid between 1999–2013, but the survival rate was small given the intensive property development along the beach. Since 2013 no further eggs have been observed there. Thailand was once a sanctuary for leatherback turtles.

== Location ==
Sirinat National Park in overview PARO 5 (Nakhon Si Thammarat)

17) Sirinat National Park in overview PARO 5 (Nakhon Si Thammarat)

	National park
1	Ao Phang Nga
2	Hat Chao Mai
3	Hat Khanom–Mu Ko Thale Tai
4	Hat Noppharat Thara– Mu Ko Phi Phi
5	Khao Lak–Lam Ru
6	Khao Lampi–Hat Thai Mueang
7	Khao Luang
8	Khao Nan
9	Khao Phanom Bencha
10	Mu Ko Lanta
11	Mu Ko Phetra
12	Mu Ko Similan
13	Mu Ko Surin
14	Namtok Si Khit
15	Namtok Yong
16	Si Phang Nga
17	Sirinat
18	Tarutao
19	Thale Ban
20	Than Bok Khorani

	Wildlife sanctuary
21	Kathun
22	Khao Pra–Bang Khram
23	Khlong Phraya
24	Namtok Song Phraek

	Non-hunting area
25	Bo Lo
26	Khao Nam Phrai
27	Khao Phra Thaeo
28	Khao Pra–Bang Khram
29	Khlong Lam Chan
30	Laem Talumpuk
31	Ko Libong
32	Nong Plak Phraya– Khao Raya Bangsa
33	Thung Thale
	Forest park
34	Bo Namrong Kantang
35	Namtok Phan
36	Namtok Raman
37	Namtok Thara Sawan
38	Sa Nang Manora

== See also ==
- List of national parks of Thailand
- DNP - Sirinat National Park
- List of Protected Areas Regional Offices of Thailand
