= Mu Ko Phetra National Park =

Marine protected area in the Strait of Malacca off Thailand

- IUCN category II (national park)
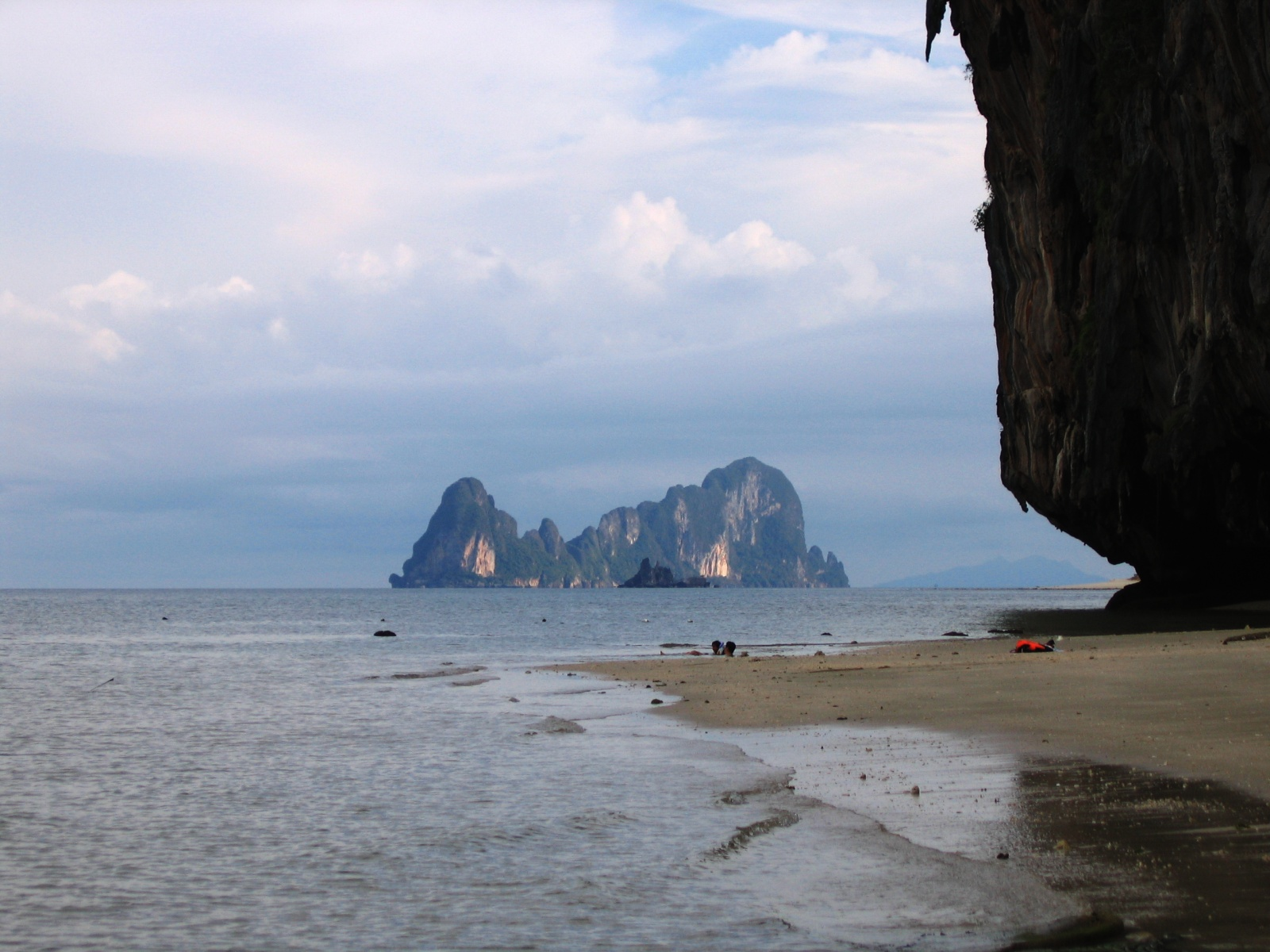
- Ko Phetra from Ko Lao Liang Nuea

- Location within Thailand
- Location: Trang Province and Satun Province, Thailand
- Coordinates: 6°51′0″N 99°32′0″E
- Area: 494 km^{2} (191 sq mi)
- Established: 1984
- Visitors: 129,851 (in 2019)
- Governing body: Department of National Parks, Wildlife and Plant Conservation

Mu Ko Phetra is a marine national park in the Strait of Malacca off Thailand, covering mostly intact coastal line, open water, and about 30 islands of the southern part of Trang Province and the northern part of Satun Province. Established on 31 December 1984, it is the 49th national park and 14th marine national park of Thailand.

The majority of the park, about 94.74% or 468 square kilometres (181 sq mi) out of 494 square kilometres (191 sq mi) is open water. The two largest islands of the park are Ko Phetra (Thai: เกาะเภตรา) and Ko Khao Yai (Thai: เกาะเขาใหญ่). Several islands are marine turtle egg laying sites. Rich coral reefs are present around islands. Many of the islands consist of steep limestone rocks and little beaches. They are used as temporary refuges by fishermen during fishing season.

In the caves of the cliffs high above the ground on some of the islands are where swiftlets build their nest and breed. Several islands were placed under concession for decades to collect bird nests. They are highly valuable and closely guarded with firearms. Traveling to those islands should be done with local tour companies as their boats are recognized and ignored by guards.

The Thai name Phetra comes from Malay Pulau Petra (the island of Petra).

The continued existence of the park is threatened by the proposed Pak Bara deepwater seaport.

== Trang islands ==
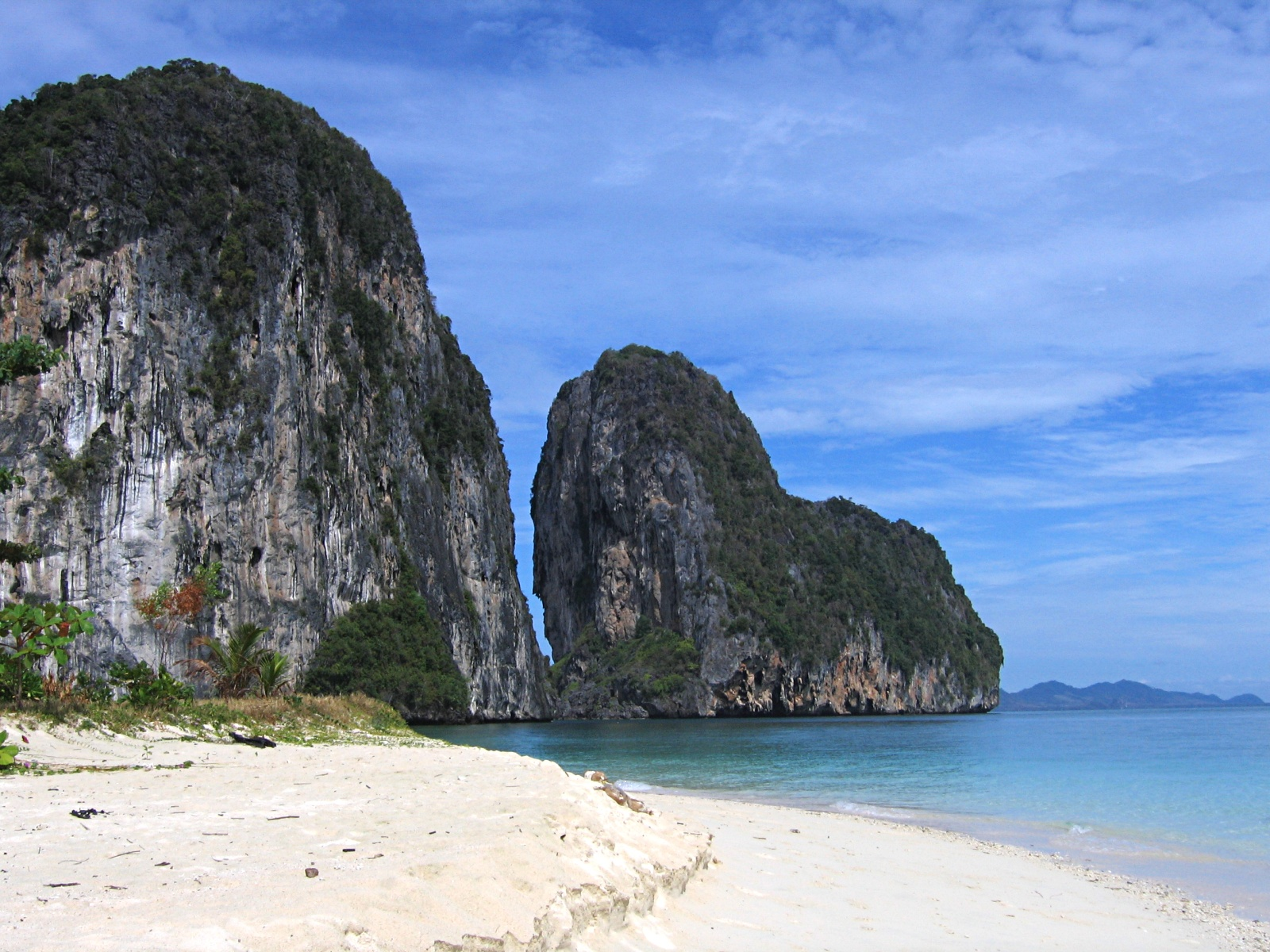
Ko Lao Liang Tai

- Ko Lao Liang consists of two similar islands separated by just 300 m. The smaller, northernmost island, Ko Lao Liang Nuea (Thai: เกาะเหลาเหลียงเหนือ) (also known as Ko Lao Liang Nong; Thai: เกาะเหลาเหลียงน้อง), and the larger island to the south, Ko Lao Liang Tai (Thai: เกาะเหลาเหลียงใต้) (also known as Ko Lao Liang Phi; Thai: เกาะเหลาเหลียงพี่). Both have rather small beaches and are bird nest gathering concessions. Around the islands are shallow reefs.

== Satun islands ==
- Ko Phetra (Thai: เกาะเภตรา / Malay: Pulau Petra) is an island with odd-shaped cliffs. A bird nest concession island, the surrounding sea is available for diving.
- Ko Lidi (Thai: เกาะลิดี / Malay: Pulau Lidi) is a large island with beach.
- Ko Khao Yai (Thai: เกาะเขาใหญ่), the biggest island with castle-like limestone rocks. Part of the island is the Ao Kam Poo (Thai: อ่าวก้ามปู), a 700 m wide bay with waterfall and stream. The shores of the bay are a turtle egg-laying sites.
- Ko Bulon (Thai: เกาะบุโหลน / Malay: Pulau Bulan), a popular tourist island with clear water and coral reef.

== Satun beaches ==
- Rawai Beach (Thai: หาดราไว), not to be confused with a beach of the same name in Phuket Province, is a 3.5 km long beach on the mainland. It is popular camping spot.

== Location ==
Mu Ko Phetra National Park in overview PARO 5 (Nakhon Si Thammarat)

11) Mu Ko Phetra National Park in overview PARO 5

	National park
1	Ao Phang Nga
2	Hat Chao mai
3	Hat Khanom–Mu Ko Thale Tai
4	Hat Noppharat Thara– Mu Ko Phi Phi
5	Khao Lak–Lam Ru
6	Khao Lampi–Hat Thai Mueang
7	Khao Luang
8	Khao Nan
9	Khao Phanom Bencha
10	Mu Ko Lanta
11	Mu Ko Phetra
12	Mu Ko Similan
13	Mu Ko Surin
14	Namtok Si Khit
15	Namtok Yong
16	Si Phang Nga
17	Sirinat
18	Tarutao
19	Thale Ban
20	Than Bok Khorani

	Wildlife sanctuary
21	Kathun
22	Khao Pra–Bang Khram
23	Khlong Phraya
24	Namtok Song Phraek

	Non-hunting area
25	Bo Lo
26	Khao Nam Phrai
27	Khao Phra Thaeo
28	Khao Pra–Bang Khram
29	Khlong Lam Chan
30	Laem Talumpuk
31	Ko Libong
32	Nong Plak Phraya– Khao Raya Bangsa
33	Thung Thale
	Forest park
34	Bo Namrong Kantang
35	Namtok Phan
36	Namtok Raman
37	Namtok Thara Sawan
38	Sa Nang Manora

== See also ==
- List of national parks of Thailand
- DNP - Mu Ko Phetra National Park
- List of Protected Areas Regional Offices of Thailand
