= Ko Kradan =

Island in Ko Libong, Thailand

Native name: เกาะกระดาน
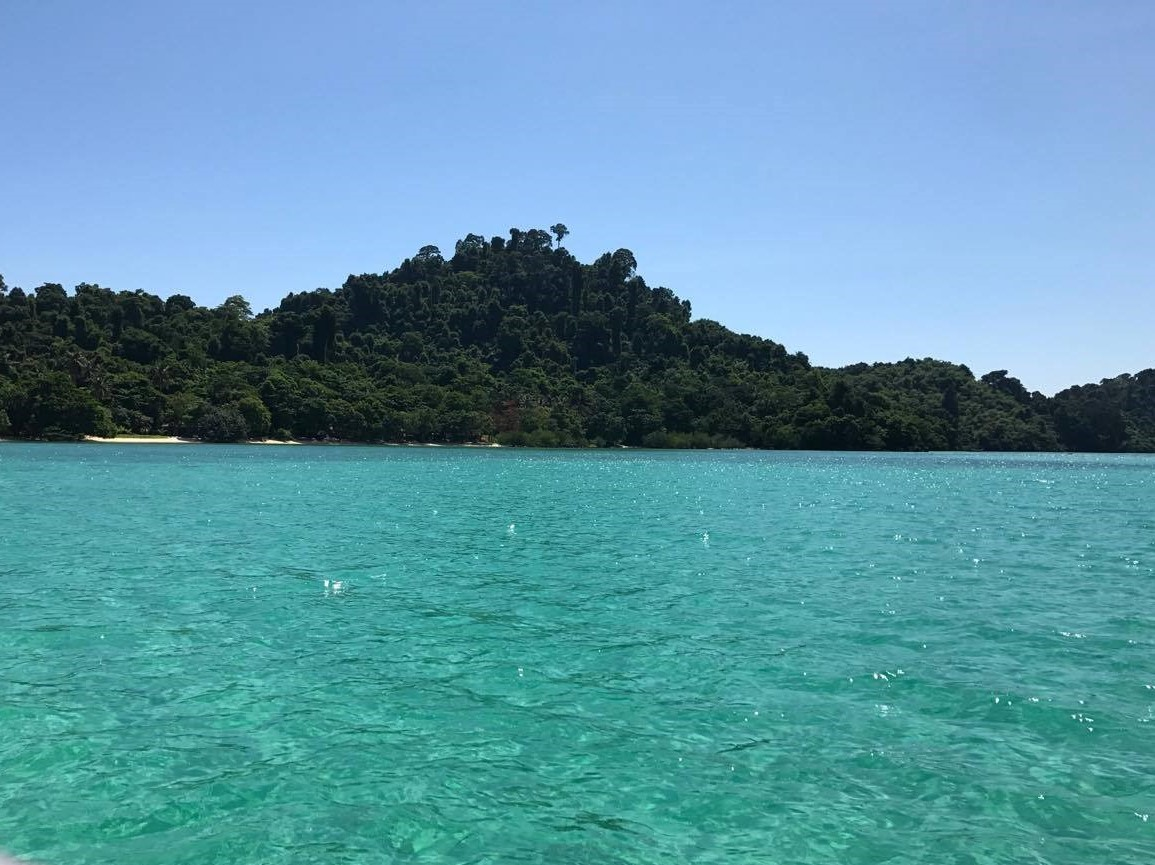
- Interactive map of Ko Kradan

Geography
- Location: Strait of Malacca
- Coordinates: 7°18′36″N 99°15′11.3″E
- Archipelago: Libong Islands
- Area: 1.67 km^{2} (0.64 sq mi)

Administration
- Thailand
- Province: Trang
- District: Kantang
- Tambon: Ko Libong

Additional information
- Time zone: ICT (UTC+7)
- Postal code: 92110

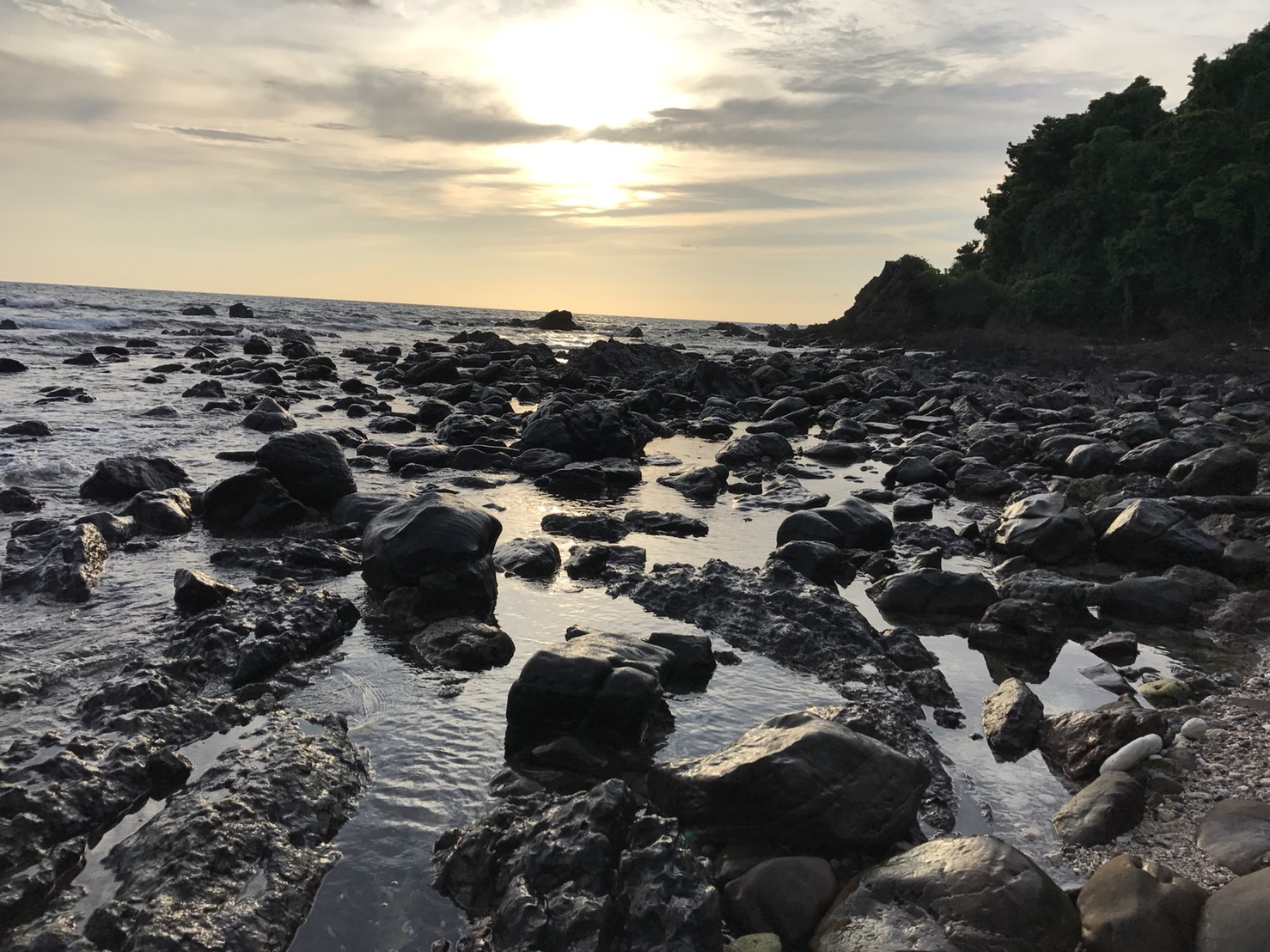
Sunset beach

Ko Kradan (Also known as: Paradise beach) (Alternately transliterated as Koh Kradan, Ko Kadan or Koh Kadan) (Thai: เกาะกระดาน) is an island in Trang province, Southern Thailand. Ko Kradan is described by Tourism Thailand as one of the most beautiful islands in Trang. Ko Kradan has white sandy beaches and transparent water which allow the coral reef to be seen clearly. Most of Ko Kradan is controlled by Hat Chao Mai National Park. The rest is privately owned.

== Ranking awards ==
In 2023, it was ranked as the best beach in the world.

== Geography ==
Ko Kradan is named from its oblong shape. Ko Kradan has an area approximately 600 acres or 2.4 square kilometers. It is located about 10 kilometers from the west coast of Southern Thailand.

== Beach division ==
- Ko Kradan Beach is located on the east of the island. The beach is about 2 kilometers long. From the beach, you can see Ko Libong, Ko Whan, Ko Mook, and Ko Cherg.
- Ao Niang Beach is located on the south of the island. The beach is about 800 meters long. From the beach, you can see Ko Libong.
- Ao Pai Beach is located on the north of the island. The beach is about 200 meters long but has no coral reef. From the beach, you can see Ko Cherg, Ko Whan, and Ko Mook.
- Ao Chong Lom Beach is located on the west of the island. The beach is about 100 meters long, and is called "Sunset Beach" for its exceptional sunset.
