= Streptomyces andamanensis =

Scientific classification
- Domain: Bacteria
- Kingdom: Bacillati
- Phylum: Actinomycetota
- Class: Actinomycetia
- Order: Streptomycetales
- Family: Streptomycetaceae
- Genus: Streptomyces
- Species: S. andamanensis

Binomial name
- Streptomyces andamanensis Sripreechasak et al. 2016

Type strain
- KCTC 29502, NBRC 110085, PCU 347, KC-112

Species of bacterium

Streptomyces andamanensis is a bacterium species from the genus Streptomyces which has been isolated from soil from the Similan Islands in Thailand.

== See also ==
- List of Streptomyces species
