= Similan Islands =

Marine protected area in Phang Nga Province, southern Thailand

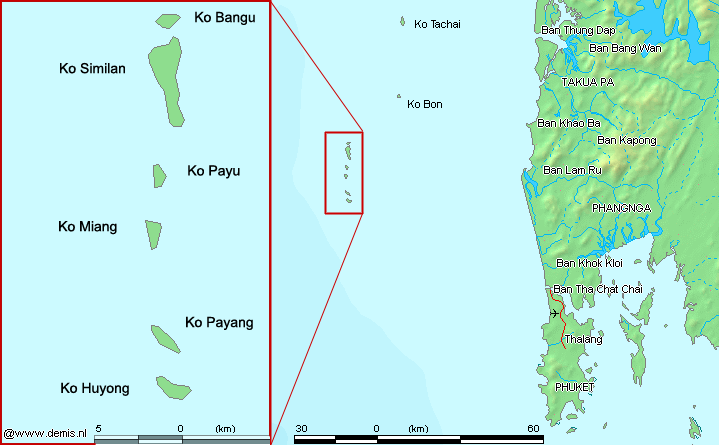
Similan Islands

The Similan Islands (Thai: หมู่เกาะสิมิลัน, RTGS: Mu Ko Similan, Thai pronunciation: [mùː kɔ̀ʔ si.mi.lan], Malay: Kepulauan Sembilan) is a continental archipelago in the Andaman Sea off the coast of, and part of, Phang Nga Province in southern Thailand. It is the maritime border between India and Thailand. It was established as Mu Ko Similan National Park in 1982 after a one-year assessment by the forestry department.

== Access and tourism ==
Access to the Similan Islands is primarily through Tab Lamu Port, located just south of Khao Lak in Phang Nga Province. The park headquarters is situated in Tab Lamu, a small fishing village approximately 13 kilometres (8.1 mi) from Bang La On in Khao Lak. Regular boat services to the islands operate from the middle of October to the middle of May, with trips taking around three hours on standard boats and approximately 70 minutes by speedboat.

During the diving season, liveaboard dive boats frequent the Similan Islands. These boats, departing from Tab Lamu, Ko Lanta, Phuket, and Ranong, offer multi-day stays in the Similan National Marine Park.

The Similan Islands Park has experienced significant visitor traffic, making it one of Thailand's most overcrowded national parks. Data reported by the Department of National Parks (DNP) indicates that since October 2017, the park has received 883,438 visitors. The peak season, from mid-October to mid-May, typically sees five to six thousand visitors per day. The high visitor numbers have led to environmental degradation, prompting increased regulatory measures.

Annually, the park is closed during the rainy season, from 16 May to 15 October. Specifically, the island of Ko Tachai has been indefinitely closed to tourists since 15 October 2016 to facilitate environmental recovery. Following its re-opening on 15 October 2018, the park implemented a daily visitor limit of 3,850 to mitigate environmental impact. This measure represents a reduction from the previous average of about 7,000 visitors per day. In 2017, the park attracted approximately 912,000 tourists. The introduction of these restrictions has elicited responses from tour operators, who express concerns over potential job losses. Additionally, as part of the rehabilitation efforts, all overnight accommodations on the islands have been removed.

== Geography ==
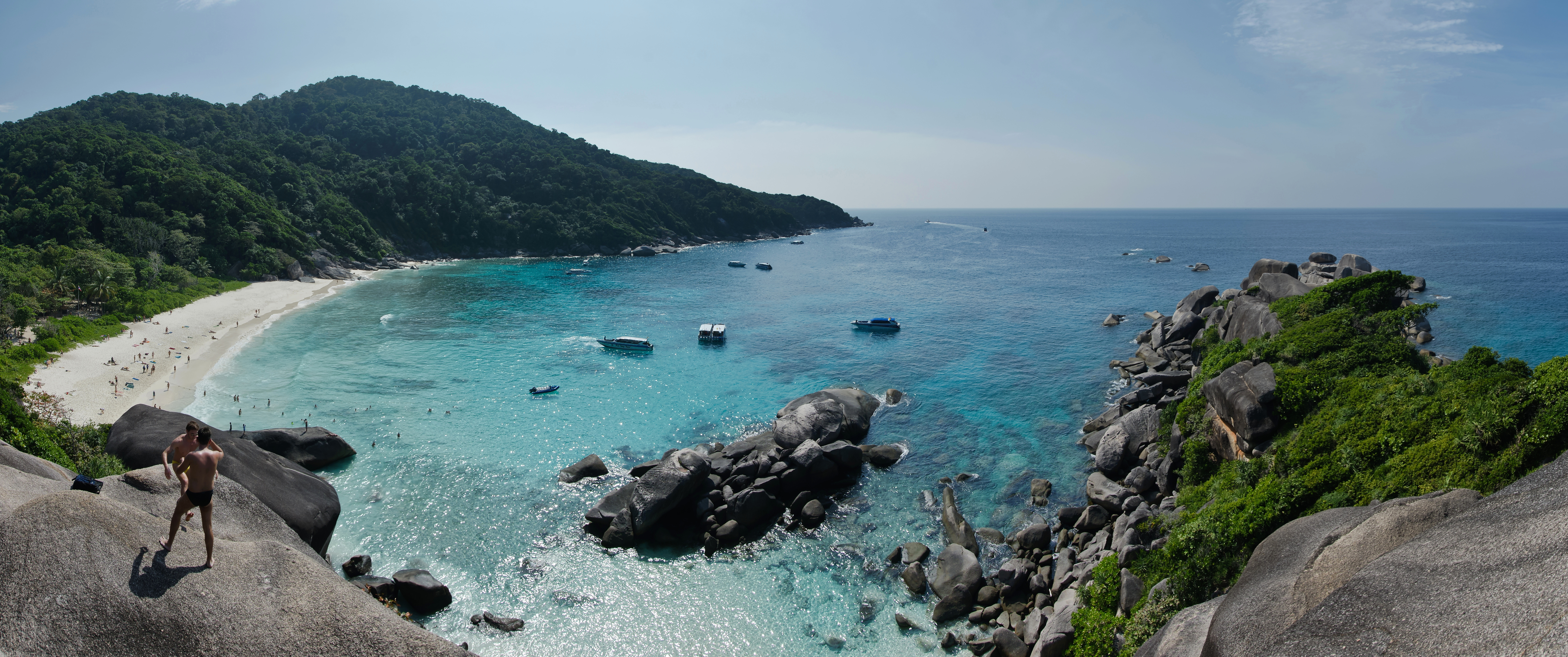
Ko Similan over Ao (bay) Kuerk

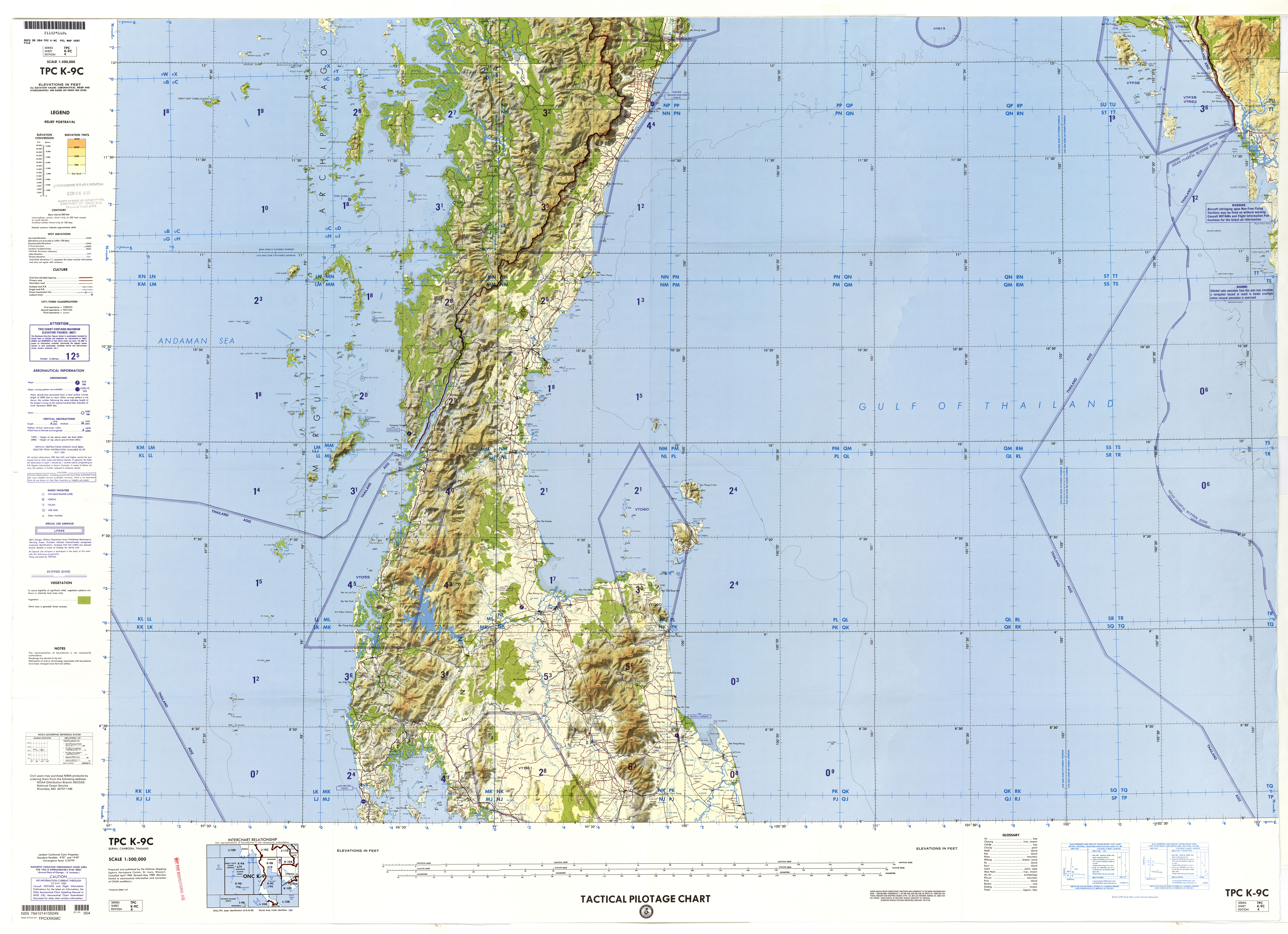
Map including the Similan Islands (DMA, 1989)

The islands are at 8°39′09″N 97°38′27″E

The park is an archipelago consisting of 11 islands, occupying an area of 87,500 rai ~ 140 square kilometres (54 sq mi) with a land area of about 26 square kilometres (10 sq mi). For convenience, the Thai Department of National Parks (DNP) has assigned numbers to the islands. From north to south, they are:

- Island 11: Ko Tachai
- Island 10: Ko Bon, also known as Ko Talu
- Island 9: Ko Ba-ngu, also known as Ko Bayu
- Island 8: Ko Similan
- Island 7: Ko Hin Pousar
- Island 6: Ko Payu, also known as Ko Pa Yu
- Island 5: Ko Ha
- Island 4: Ko Miang, also known as Ko Meang. Park HQ is here.
- Island 3: Ko Payan, also known as Ko Pa Yan
- Island 2: Ko Payang, also known as Ko Pa Yang
- Island 1: Ko Huyong, also known as Ko Hu Yong

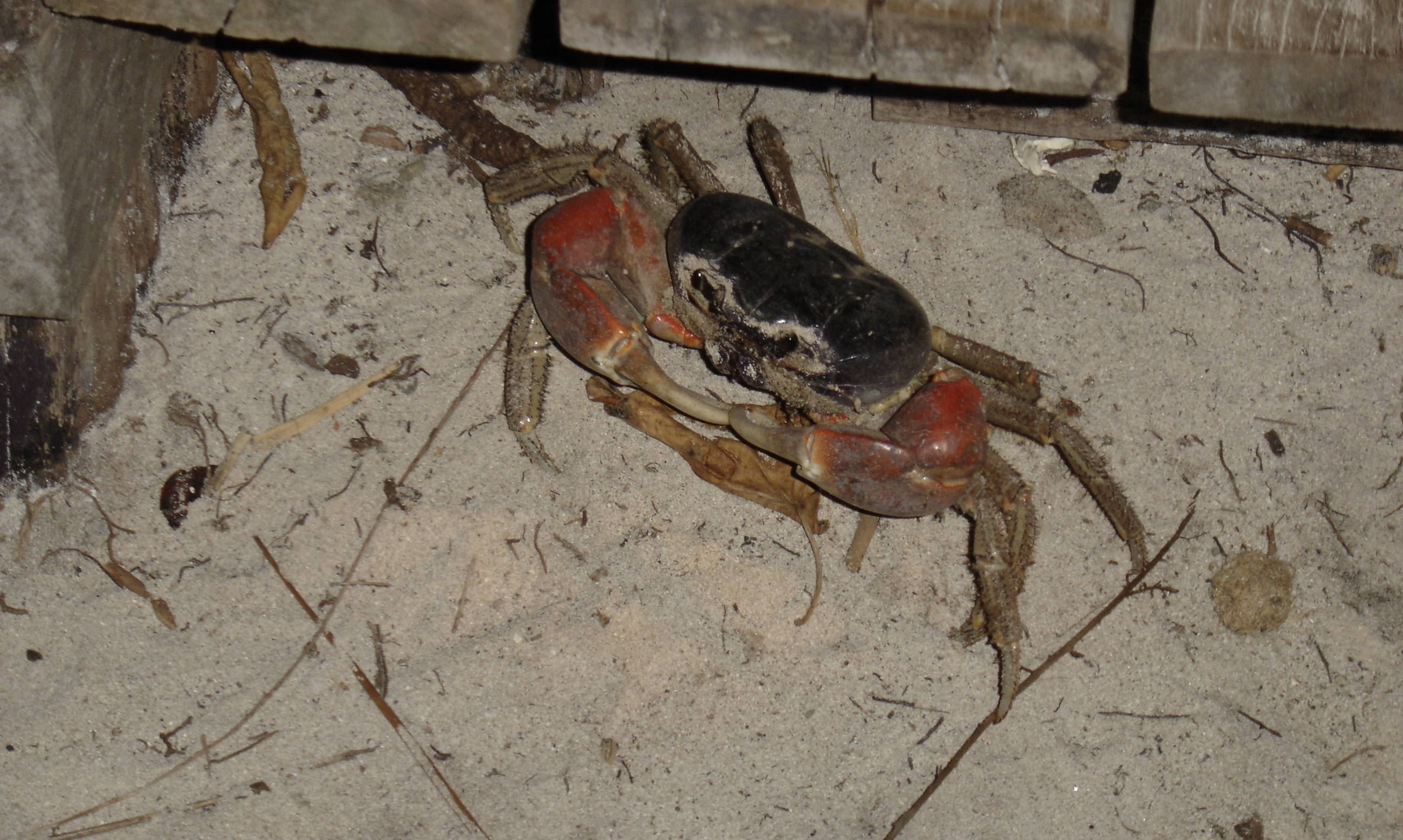
A hairy-legged mountain crab, Ko Miang

The Similans lie 70 kilometres off the coast of Phang Nga Province. "Similan" is a Yawi word meaning 'nine'. Ko Bon and Tachai were added to the national park in 1998.

Ko Similan: Ko Similan is the largest island. The sea in the area has an average depth of 60 feet. Underwater it is full of rock formations and coral reefs in several shapes and forms, resembling such things as deer, leaves, brains, and mushrooms. Above the water are found many diverse species such as the Nicobar pigeon, mangrove monitor lizards, flying fox and more.

Ko Huyong: Ko Huyong has the longest and widest beach in the park. However, the park prohibits any tourists from landing on the island as the beach is a place where turtles come to lay their eggs.

== Wildlife protection ==
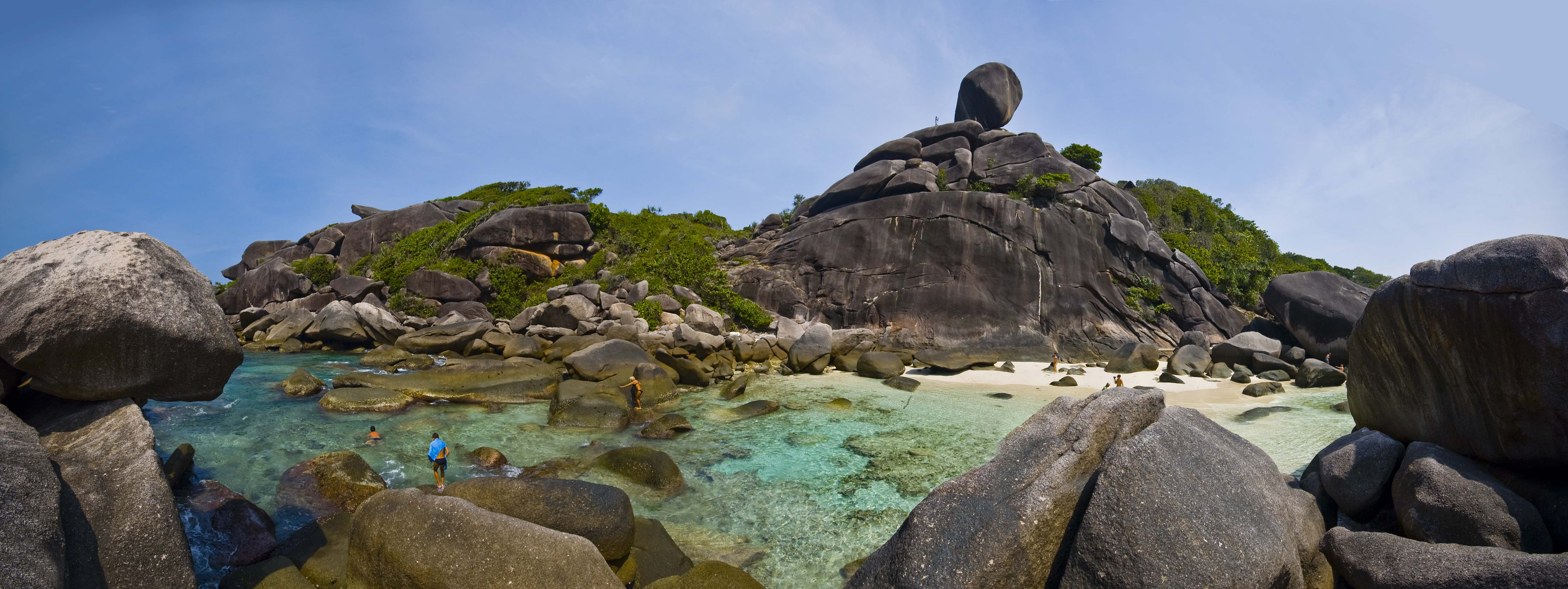
Ko Similan

Within the Similan and Surin National Parks, specific islands, namely Islands 1, 2, and 3, are restricted from public access. This measure is in place to support a turtle hatching protection program and to aid in reef conservation efforts. Notably, Island number 3 is privately owned by a member of the Thai royal family.

Although fishing activities are officially prohibited in both Similan and Surin National Parks to protect marine life and habitats, observations suggest that fishing boats frequently operate in and around these parks. Divers in the area often report encountering fishing nets entangled in the reefs and illegal fishing traps. Recent years have seen an increase in the discovery of such illegal fishing equipment, particularly in areas outside the most frequented dive sites. These traps have been found to contain a variety of marine life, including trevallies, batfish, barracuda, golden pilot jacks, and triggerfish. Notably, the regions around Ko Bon and Ko Tachai have been identified as having a higher prevalence of these fishing traps.

=== Important Bird Area ===
The archipelago has been designated an Important Bird Area (IBA) by BirdLife International because it supports a population of Vulnerable pale-capped pigeons.

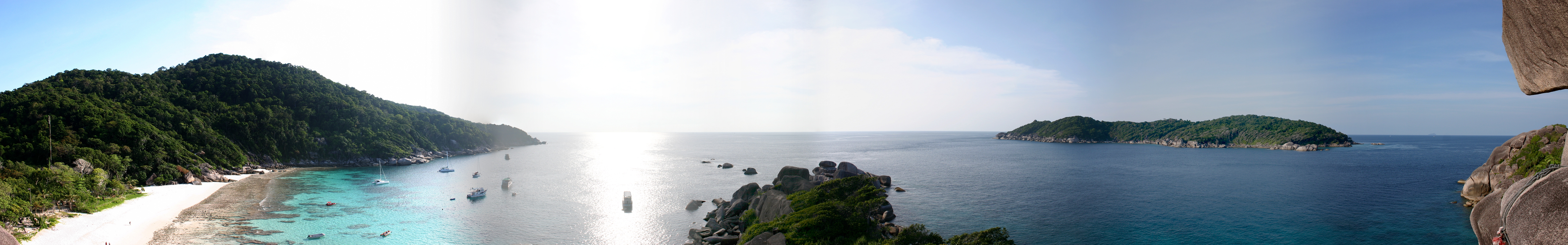
Panorama from Similan Islands in the Andaman Sea
Ocean Animals at Mu Ko Similan National Park
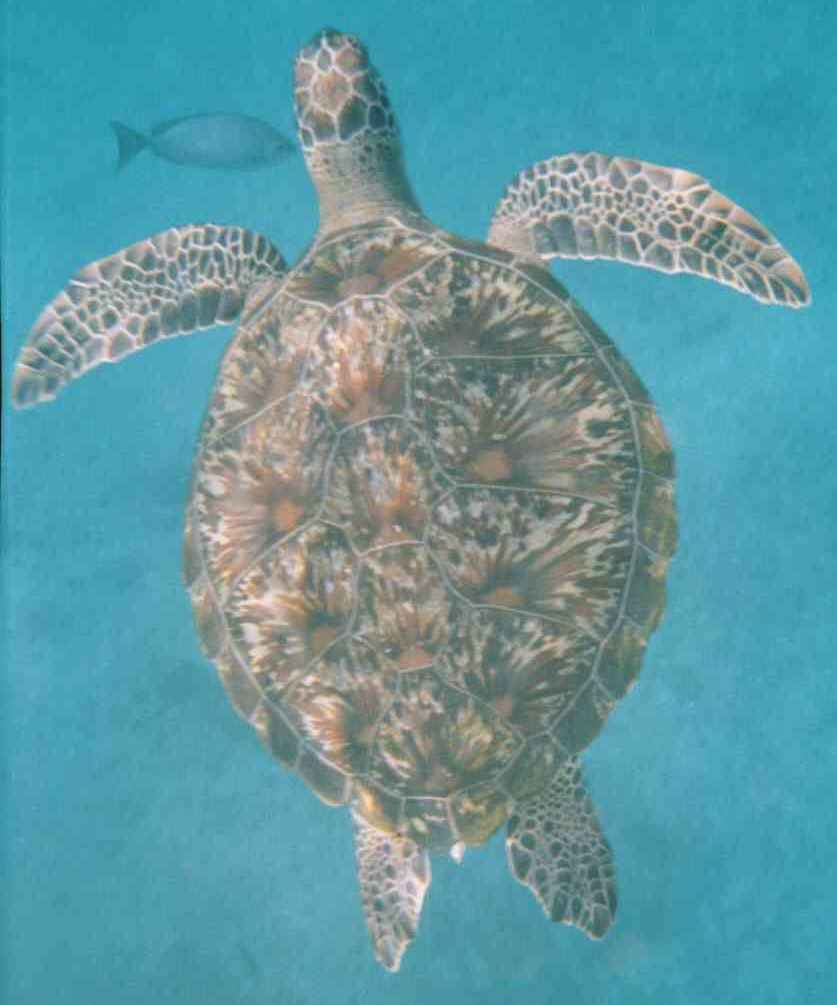
Turtle at Similan

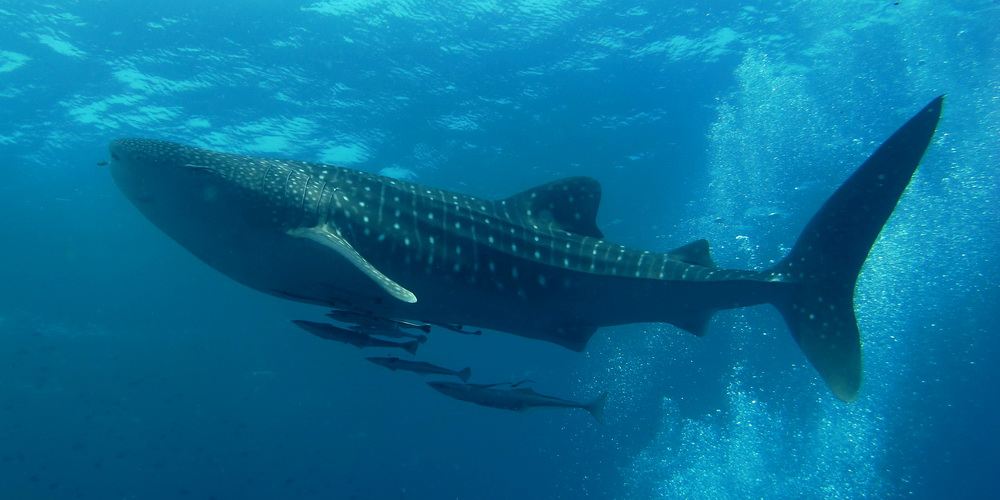
Whale shark at Similan

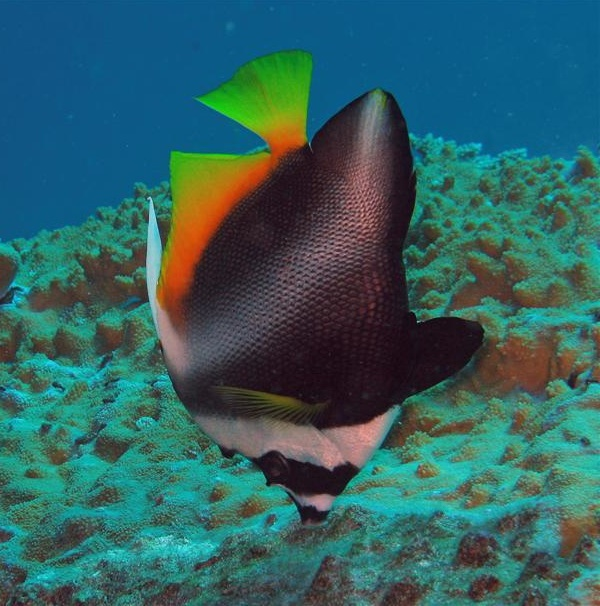
Phantom Bannerfish at Similan

== 2004 tsunami ==
The Similan Islands were severely damaged by the 2004 Indian Ocean tsunami. Scuba divers there reported being caught in a violent, swirling current suddenly while underwater. Local camcorder footage showed the tsunami surging inland and flooding camping equipment.

== Location ==
Mu Ko Similan National Park in overview PARO 5 (Nakhon Si Thammarat)

12) Mu Ko Similan National Park in overview PARO 5

	National park
1	Ao Phang Nga
2	Hat Chao Mai
3	Hat Khanom-Mu Ko Thale Tai
4	Hat Noppharat Thara– Mu Ko Phi Phi
5	Khao Lak-Lam Ru
6	Khao Lampi-Hat Thai Mueang
7	Khao Luang
8	Khao Nan
9	Khao Phanom Bencha
10	Mu Ko Lanta
11	Mu Ko Phetra
12	Mu Ko Similan
13	Mu Ko Surin
14	Namtok Si Khit
15	Namtok Yong
16	Si Phang Nga
17	Sirinat
18	Tarutao
19	Thale Ban
20	Than Bok Khorani

	Wildlife sanctuary
21	Kathun
22	Khao Pra–Bang Khram
23	Khlong Phraya
24	Namtok Song Phraek

	Non-hunting area
25	Bo Lo
26	Khao Nam Phrai
27	Khao Phra Thaeo
28	Khao Pra–Bang Khram
29	Khlong Lam Chan
30	Laem Talumpuk
31	Ko Libong
32	Nong Plak Phraya– Khao Raya Bangsa
33	Thung Thale
	Forest park
34	Bo Namrong Kantang
35	Namtok Phan
36	Namtok Raman
37	Namtok Thara Sawan
38	Sa Nang Manora

== See also ==
- List of islands of Thailand
- List of national parks of Thailand
- DNP - Mu Ko Similan National Park
- List of Protected Areas Regional Offices of Thailand
