= Kantang Hot Spring Forest Park =

Forest park in Thailand

Kantang Hot Spring Forest Park (Thai: วนอุทยานบ่อน้ำร้อนกันตัง) is a forest park in Thailand which is opened as a health care for tourist attraction.

== Description ==
Kantang Hot Spring Forest Park, also known as Khuan Kaeng Hot Spring, is located in Kantang District of Trang Province, the South of Thailand, on the area of Khuan Kaeng National Forest. The Royal Forest Department established it to be the Forest Park on June 9, 2006. It is well known for local people and tourists; therefore, it became a destination for visitors to Trang Province and for people who care about their health.

== Geology ==
There is around 80,000 square meters in a plain area on foothills which include Kao Wang National Forest, Khuan Kaeng Forest and Nam Rab Forest. They are mostly tropical rain forests. Some area is the peat swamp forest that makes flooding happens all the year. In some parts, there is hot water always springing in the surface, which is called Hot Spring. The ground contains several kinds of rocks and stones which are red scree, brown sandstone and shale.

== Flora ==
There have been plenty of nature in the forest, which are rubber, takian, wha, wild rose apple, tung fah, kor, daeng khuan, kradoan, tuanghon, waii, lumpi, palm and orchid.

== Fauna ==
- Mammals: civet, dusky leaf monkey, mouse deer
- Aves: wild chicken and various kind of birds
- Amphibians: frogs
- Reptiles: snakes
- Marines: raninidaes

== Tourist Attraction ==
=== Khuan Kaeng Hot Spring ===
Hot Spring area has been developed to be 3 ponds with different constant temperature: 70, 40 and 20 Degree Celsius. The visitor tend to come for their health, since it has minerals in hot water to improve the circulatory system.
There is also a public pond for dipping feet, another public pond for shower, and 9 private bathrooms.

=== Study Route ===
There are 3 routes in the peat swamp forest and tropical rain forest area which are 500, 750 and 2,000 meters for studying plants and animals for Biological Diversity Research and support tourism in Thailand.

=== Service and Product ===
There also be foot massage and Thai massage service, and selling spa products which contain mostly ingredients from the hot spring water.
