= Large forest gecko =

There are two species of gecko named large forest gecko:

- Gekko smithii, native to mainland Southeast Asia and Indonesia
- Gekko albomaculatus, found in Thailand and Malaysia
