= Kantang district =

Kantang กันตัง
- District
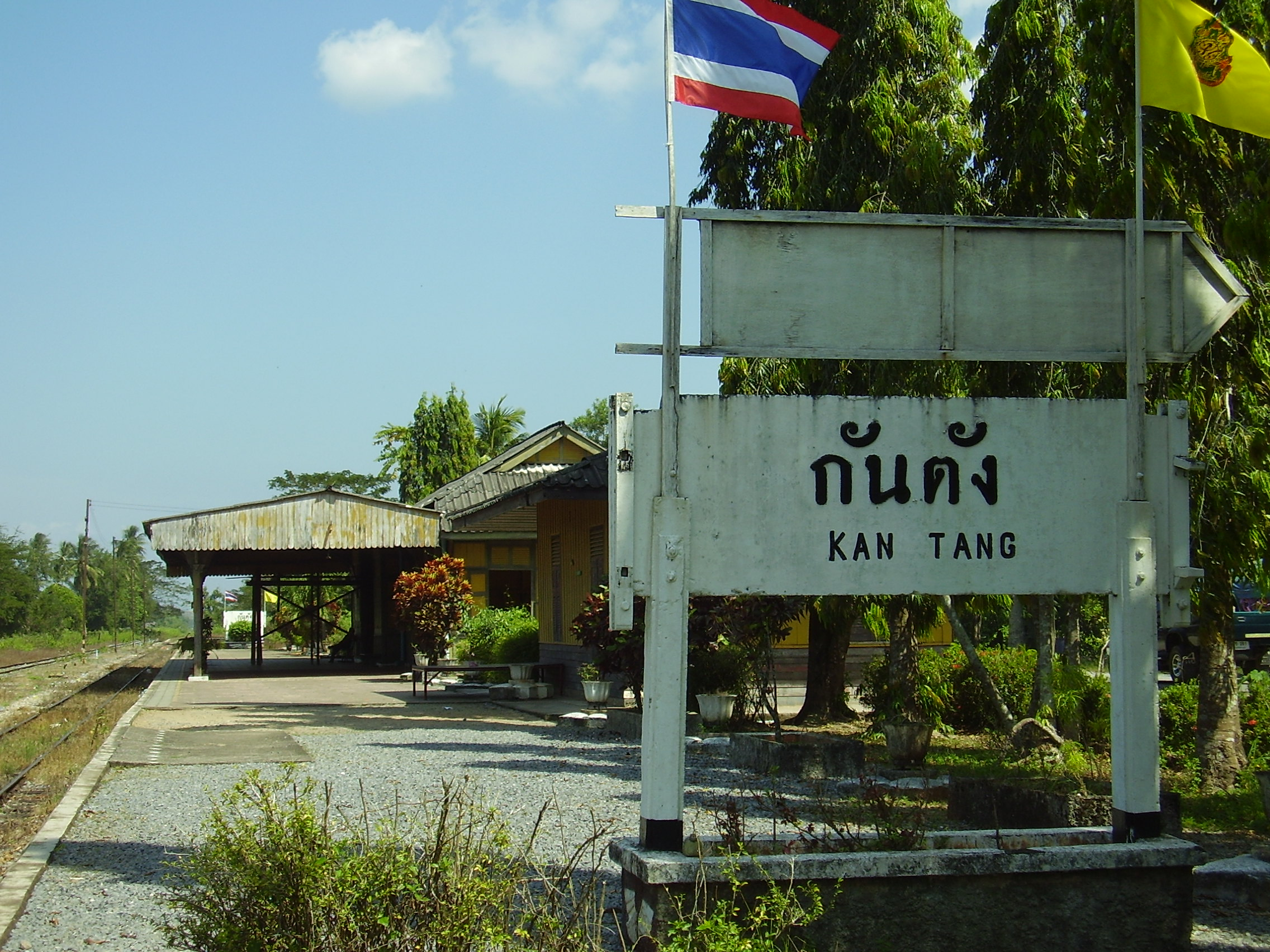
- Kantang railway station, last stop of the Andaman Railway Line

- District location in Trang province
- Coordinates: 7°24′20″N 99°30′55″E
- Country: Thailand
- Province: Trang
- Seat: Kantang

Area
  - Total: 612.7 km^{2} (236.6 sq mi)

Population (2012)
  - Total: 86,325
  - Density: 135.5/km^{2} (351/sq mi)
- Time zone: UTC+7 (ICT)
- Postal code: 92110
- Geocode: 9202

Kantang (Thai: กันตัง, pronounced [kān.tāŋ]) is a district (amphoe) in the western part of Trang province, Thailand.

== History ==
Kantang was the original capital of Trang Province, at first in Khuan Thani, and then from 1893 to 1916 in Kantang itself. As the area was prone to flooding, the capital was moved inland to its present location. The city pillar shrine (lak mueang) of Trang is still at its original location at Khuan Thani.

== Geography ==
Neighboring districts are (from the north clockwise): Sikao, Mueang Trang, and Yan Ta Khao of Trang Province. To the southwest is the Andaman Sea. The district is at the mouth of the Trang River.

== Administration ==
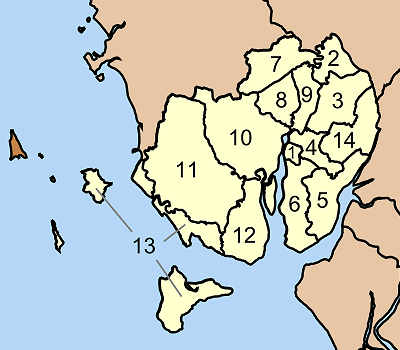
Map of districts

The district is divided into 14 sub-districts (tambons), which are further subdivided into 83 villages (mubans). The town (thesaban mueang) Kantang covers the entire tambon Kantang. There are 13 tambon administrative organizations (TAO) in the district.

No.	Name	Thai	Villages	Pop.
1.	Kantang	กันตัง	-	13,225
2.	Khuan Thani	ควนธานี	6	4,630
3.	Bang Mak	บางหมาก	6	5,395
4.	Bang Pao	บางเป้า	7	9,402
5.	Wang Won	วังวน	5	3,991
6.	Kantang Tai	กันตังใต้	6	6,972
7.	Khok Yang	โคกยาง	8	4,293
8.	Khlong Lu	คลองลุ	7	4,069
9.	Yan Sue	ย่านซื่อ	4	2,143
10.	Bo Nam Ron	บ่อน้ำร้อน	9	9,039
11.	Bang Sak	บางสัก	6	5,698
12.	Na Kluea	นาเกลือ	6	4,299
13.	Ko Libong	เกาะลิบง	8	6,843
14.	Khlong Chi Lom	คลองชีล้อม	5	4,286

== Economy ==
The Kantang District's chief industry is fishing. The industry is concentrated in few hands and has recently come under fire by international organisations for human trafficking, over-fishing, abuse of human rights, and outright murder. An Environmental Justice Foundation video went so far as to name Kanatang's Boonlarp Fishing Partnership, Ltd., as a particularly egregious bad actor.
