= Namtok Si Khit National Park =

National park in Thailand

- IUCN category II (national park)
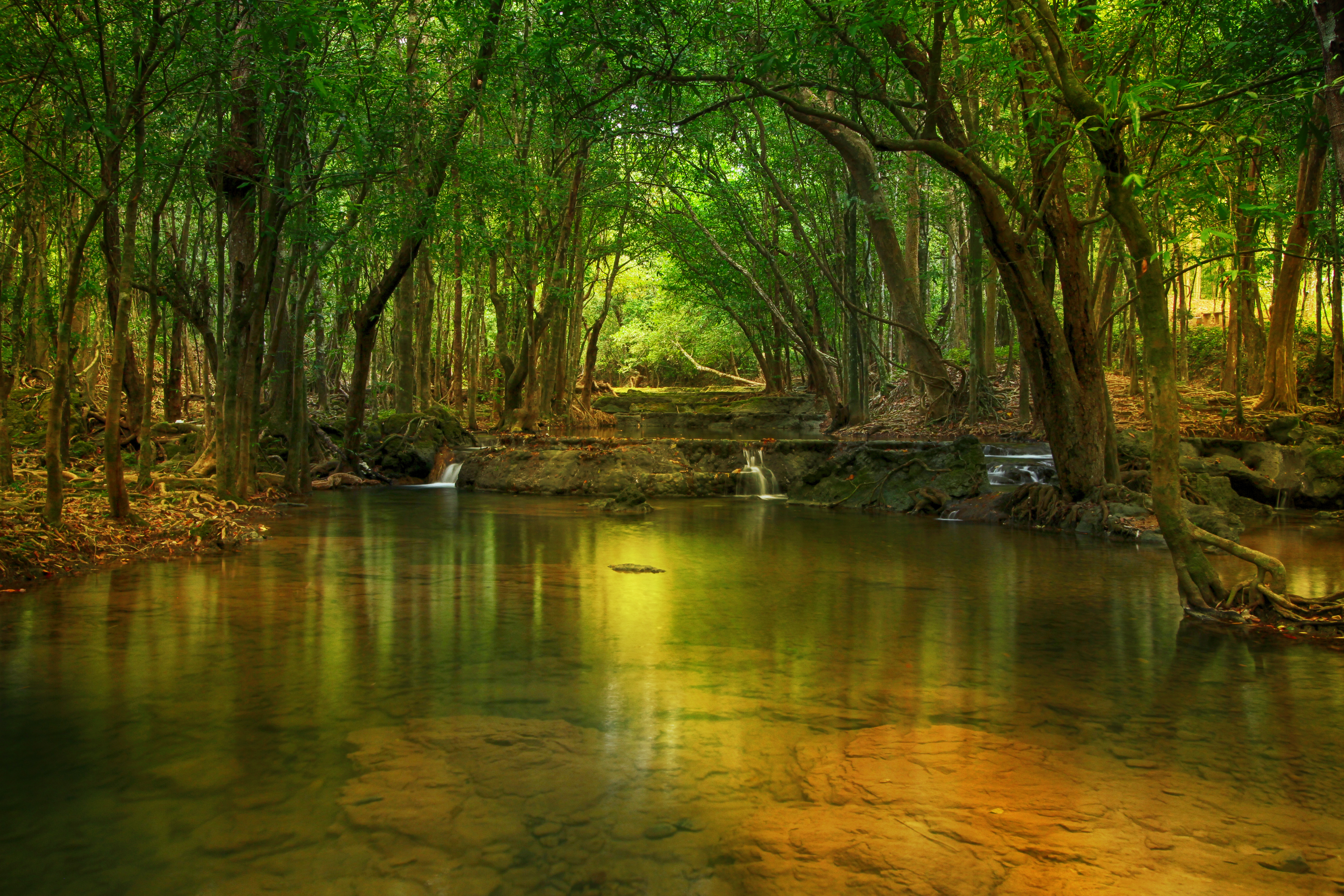

- Park location in Thailand
- Location: Thailand
- Nearest city: Surat Thani
- Coordinates: 9.0148°N 99.7730°E
- Area: 142 km^{2} (55 sq mi)
- Established: 1999
- Governing body: Department of National Parks, Wildlife and Plant Conservation

Namtok Si Khit National Park is a national park in Surat Thani and Nakhon Si Thammarat provinces in Thailand. The park is home to waterfalls, tropical forests and caves.

== Geography ==
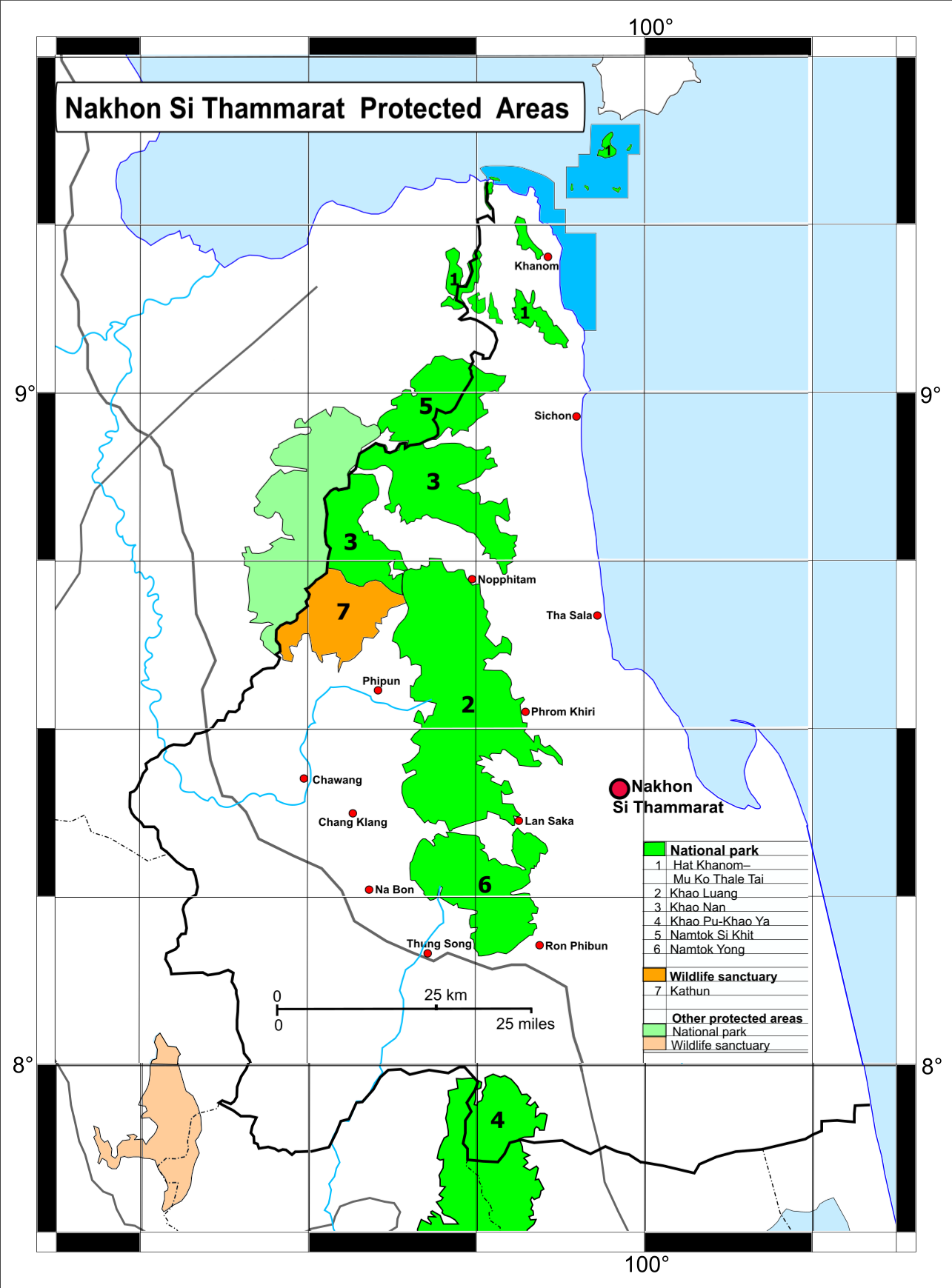
Protected areas of Nakhon Si Thammarat province

Namtok Si Khit National Park is in Kanchanadit district of Surat Thani province and Sichon district of Nakhon Si Thammarat province. It is about 60 km (37 mi) from Surat Thani. The park's area is 142 km^{2} (55 sq mi).

The park's average elevation is 700 m (2,300 ft) and the highest point is Khimot peak at 1,303 m (4,275 ft), in the Nakhon Si Thammarat Range.

== Attractions ==
The park's highest waterfall is the namesake Si Khit Waterfall at 60 m (200 ft) high, with a resultant stream 12 km (7 mi) long. Other park waterfalls include Samnak Khian and Phu Rin waterfalls. There are a number of caves in the park, including Suan Prang, about 300 m (1,000 ft) long and Khao Phap Pha, about 50 m (160 ft) long, and home to the Asian giant toad.

== Flora and fauna ==
Park forest types include tropical rainforest and secondary forest at lower elevations and evergreen forest higher up.

The park hosts animals including tiger, tapir, serow, muntjac and sambar deer. Birds in the park include kingfisher, bulbul and barbet.
