= Than Bok Khorani National Park =

National park in Thailand

- IUCN category II (national park)
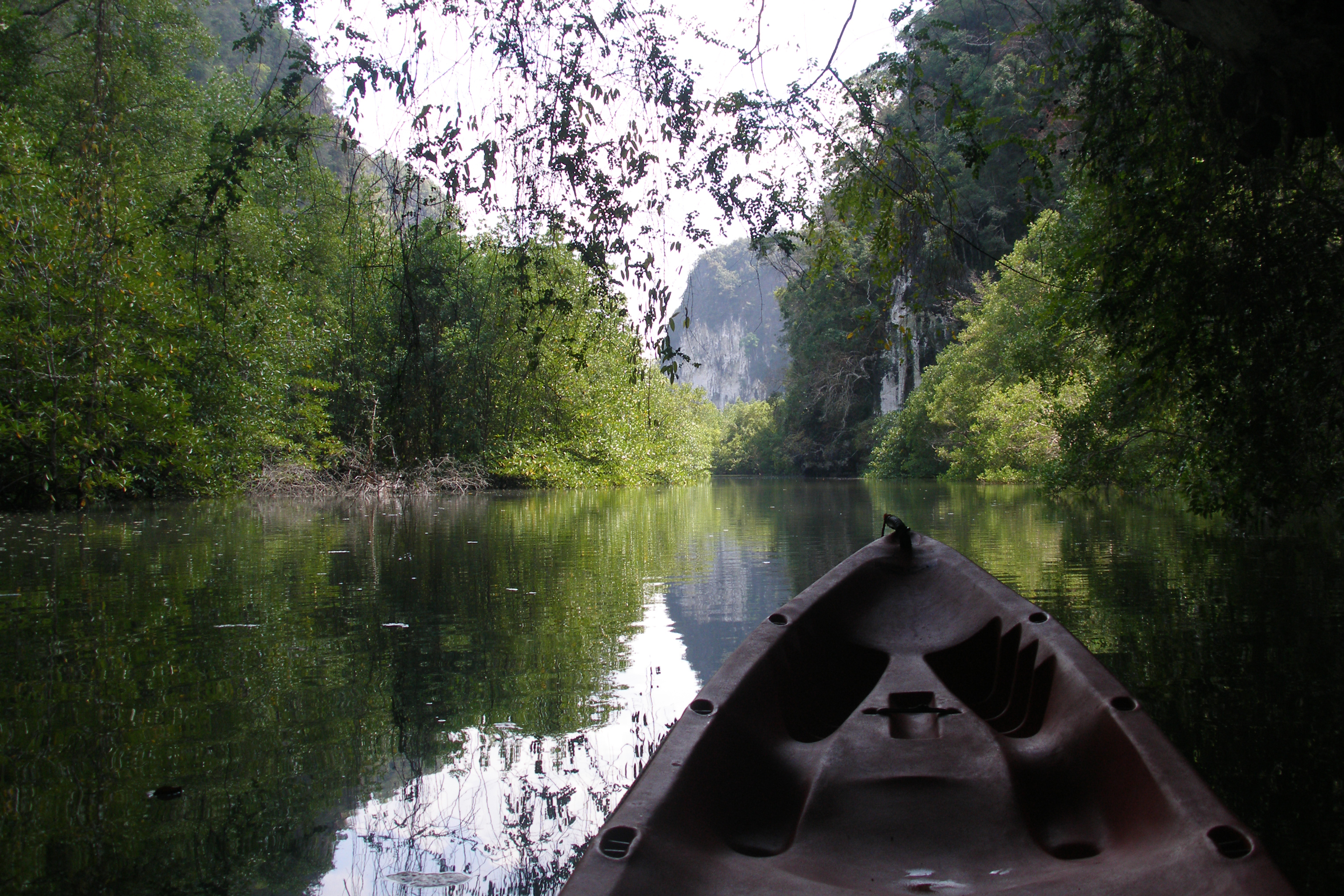

- Park location in Thailand
- Location: Thailand
- Nearest city: Krabi
- Coordinates: 8.39°N 98.74°E
- Area: 103 km^{2} (40 sq mi)
- Established: 1998
- Governing body: Department of National Parks, Wildlife and Plant Conservation

Than Bok Khorani National Park is a marine national park in Krabi province, Thailand. The park is home to islands, caves, rock formations and tropical forests.

== Geography ==
Than Bok Khorani National Park is in Ao Luek and Mueang districts of Krabi province. The park headquarters is about 48 km (30 mi) north of the provincial capital Krabi. The park's total area is 103 km^{2} (40 sq mi), comprising a number of land sections and islands in the Andaman Sea. The park's karst topography features high cliffs as well as caves. Islands include Ko Hong, Ko Lao Ka and Ko Lao Riam.

== Attractions ==
Prehistoric cave art is present in a number of the park's caves, including in Tham Phi Hua To and at Laem Fai Mai. A subterranean river issues from a park cave and features pools of turquoise-coloured waters.

== Flora and fauna ==
The park is home to forest types including tropical rainforest, hosting plant species such as Intsia palembanica, Lagerstroemia calyculata, Saraca indica, Salacca wallichiana and Ternstroemia wallichiana. Mangrove forest occurs at Khao Tham Lot Tai and is home to species such as Avicennia alba, Bruguiera cylindrica, Bruguiera parviflora, Rhizophora mucronata, Rhizophora apiculata, Xylocarpus granatum and Xylocarpus moluccensis.

The park hosts animals including fishing cat, crab-eating macaque, flying lemur, mouse deer, Malayan porcupine, mongoose, the critcally endangered pangolin and the endangered white handed gibbon and dusky langur. Birds in the park include white-rumped shama, grey wagtail, bulbul, koel and spotted dove. Freshwater fish life includes climbing perch and barb. Marine life includes parrotfish, damselfish and butterflyfish.
