= List of railway stations in Surat Thani province =

Railway stations in Surat Thani Province (From North to South)

No.	Code	Station	Thai Name	K.M.	Class	Passenger (2007)	District	Note
1.	4212	Khanthuli Railway Station	สถานีคันธุลี	566+374	4	2,595	Tha Chana	
2.	4213	Don Thup Railway Station	สถานีดอนธูป	570+057	4	1,405	Tha Chana	
3.	4215	Tha Chana Railway Station	สถานีท่าชนะ	577+780	2	32,895	Tha Chana	
4.	4217	Ban Kho Muk Halt	ป้ายหยุดรถบ้านเกาะมุกข์	584+063	*	78	Tha Chana	
5.	4218	Khao Phanom Baek Railway Station	สถานีเขาพนมแบก	588+401	4	2,127	Chaiya	
6.	4221	Chaiya Railway Station	สถานีไชยา	597+750	2	60,171	Chaiya	
7.	4224	Tha Chang Railway Station	สถานีท่าฉาง	610+538	2	4,729	Tha Chang	
8.	4225	Khlong Khud Halt	ป้ายหยุดรถคลองขุด	614+000	2	0	Tha Chang	
9.	4226	Klong Sai Railway Station	สถานีคลองไทร	618+877	4	1,374	Tha Chang	
10.	4227	Maluan Station	สถานีมะลวน	623+929	4	2,063	Phunphin	
11.	4229	Ban Thung Pho Junction Station	สถานีชุมทางบ้านทุ่งโพธิ์	631+000	3	2,339	Phunphin	Container Yard, Junction to Khiri Rat Nikhom Line.
12.	4230	Ban Donrak Halt	ป้ายหยุดรถบ้านดอนรัก	634+350	*	0	Phunphin	Kirirat Nikhom Line.
13.	4232	Ban Thungluang Halt	ป้ายหยุดรถบ้านทุ่งหลวง	640+750	*	72	Phunphin	Kirirat Nikhom Line.
14.	4233	Ban Khanai Halt	ป้ายหยุดรถบ้านขนาย	644+550	*	24	Phunphin	Kirirat Nikhom Line.
15.	4234	Ban Donriab Halt	ป้ายหยุดรถบ้านดอนเรียบ	649+350	*	0	Phunphin	Kirirat Nikhom Line.
16.	4235	Klong Yan Halt	ป้ายหยุดรถคลองยัน	652+600	*	0	Kirirat Nikhom	Kirirat Nikhom Line.
17.	4236	Khao Lung Halt	ป้ายหยุดรถเขาหลุง	655+580	*	0	Kirirat Nikhom	Kirirat Nikhom Line.
18.	4237	Ban Yang Halt	ป้ายหยุดรถบ้านยาง	658+000	*	0	Kirirat Nikhom	Kirirat Nikhom Line.
19.	4238	Khiri Rat Nikhom Railway Station	สถานีคีรีรัฐนิคม	662+000	*	4,450	Kirirat Nikhom	Kirirat Nikhom Line.
20.	4239	Surat Thani Railway Station	สถานีสุราษฎร์ธานี	635+106	1	343,803	Phunphin	Main Station
21.	4241	Khao Hua Khwai Railway Station	สถานีเขาหัวควาย	641+518	4	1,438	Phunphin	
22.	4243	Bokrang Halt	ป้ายหยุดรถบ่อกรัง	647+235	*	1	Phunphin	
23.	4245	Khao Phloo Railway Station	สถานีเขาพลู	652+467	4	1,776	Phunphin	
24.	4246	Khlong Ya Halt	ป้ายหยุดรถคลองยา	657+769	*	0	Ban Na Doem	
25.	4247	Banna Railway Station	สถานีบ้านนา	662+347	2	17,133	Ban Na Doem	
26.	4247	Huai Mud Railway Station	สถานีห้วยมุด	662+347	2	4,989	Ban Na San	
27.	4250	Nasan Railway Station	สถานีนาสาร	673+705	2	52,545	Ban Na San	
28.	4246	Khlong Prab Halt	ป้ายหยุดรถคลองปราบ	679+900	*	0	Ban Na San	
29.	4247	Phru Phi Railway Station	สถานีพรุพี	684+036	4	7,136	Ban Na San	
30.	4246	Khlong Soon Halt	ป้ายหยุดรถคลองสูญ	687+720	*	0	Ban Na San	
31.	4255	Ban Song Railway Station	สถานีบ้านส้อง	692+739	2	82,520	Wiang Sa	
32.	4255	Ban Phru Krachaeng Railway Station	สถานีบ้านพรุกระแชง	699+780	4	3,701	Wiang Sa	
