= Ban Ko Muk railway halt =

Railway halt in Thailand

Coordinates: 9.54575°N 99.16778°E

Ban Ko Muk บ้านเกาะมุกข์
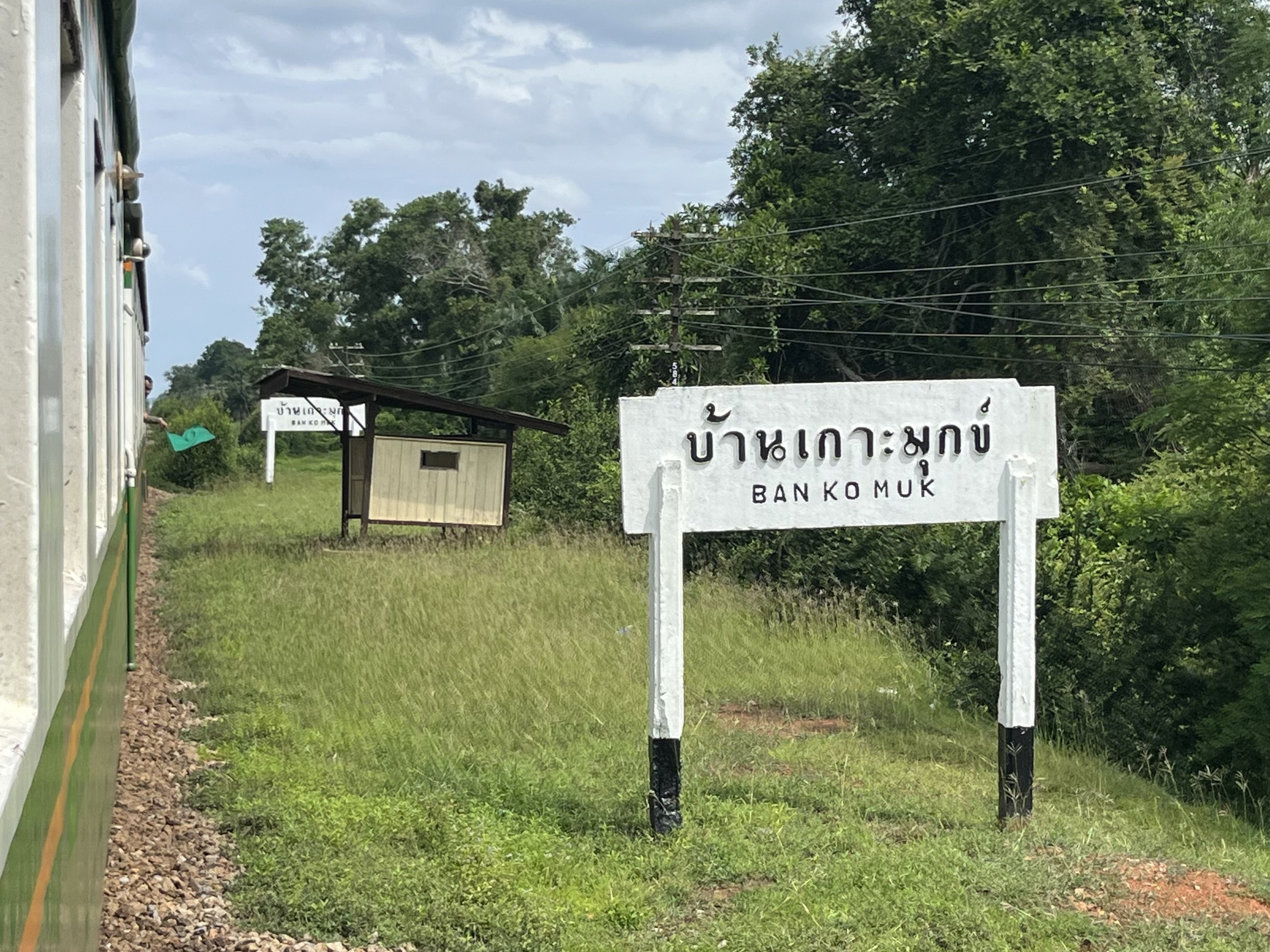

General information
- Location: Mu 6 (Ban Ko Muk), Prasong Subdistrict, Tha Chana District, Surat Thani
- Owner: State Railway of Thailand
- Line: Southern Line
- Platforms: 1
- Tracks: 1

Other information
- Station code: ะม.

Services
Preceding station	State Railway of Thailand	Following station
Tha Chana towards Hua Lamphong or Krung Thep Aphiwat	Southern Line	Khao Phanom Baek towards Su-ngai Kolok
Location

Ban Ko Muk Halt (Thai: ที่หยุดรถบ้านเกาะมุกข์) is a railway halt located in Prasong Subdistrict, Tha Chana District, Surat Thani. It is located 584.063 km (362.9 mi) from Thon Buri Railway Station

== Services ==
- Local No. 445/446 Chumphon-Hat Yai Junction-Chumphon
