= List of cities and towns in Surat Thani Province =

List of Cities and Towns in Surat Thani Province

Nr.	City	Thai	Area (km^{2})	Population	Pop. density
1.	Surat Thani City	เทศบาลนครสุราษฎร์ธานี	68.97	127,542	1,849.24
2.	Ko Samui City	เทศบาลนครเกาะสมุย	228.60	52,511	229.70
3.	Tha Kham	เทศบาลเมืองท่าข้าม	14.10	20,185	1,431.56
4.	Na San City	เทศบาลเมืองนาสาร	67.13	20,093	299.31
5.	Ban Song	เทศบาลตำบลบ้านส้อง	128.32	16,694	121.52
6.	Wat Pradu	เทศบาลตำบลวัดประดู่	58.5	12,953	221.4
7.	Khun Thale	เทศบาลตำบลขุนทะเล	81.00	12,832	158.41
8.	Don Sak Town	เทศบาลตำบลดอนสัก	21.00	11,487	547
9.	Thung Luang	เทศบาลตำบลทุ่งหลวง	83.00	10,472	126.16
10.	Chang Sai	เทศบาลตำบลช้างซ้าย	158.96	10,109	63.59
11.	Kanchanadit Town	เทศบาลตำบลกาญจนดิษฐ์	29.00	9,378	323.38
12.	Wiang Sa Town	เทศบาลตำบลเวียงสระ	4.00	9,151	2,221.16
13.	Khlong Cha-un	เทศบาลตำบลคลองชะอุ่น	160.00	8,927	56.10
14.	Phumriang Town	เทศบาลตำบลพุมเรียง	76.50	7,507	98.12
15.	Tha Thong Mai Town	เทศบาลตำบลท่าทองใหม่	3.00	6,254	2,048.667
16.	Khao Nipham	เทศบาลตำบลเขานิพันธ์	90.00	6,006	66.73
17.	Talat Chaiya	เทศบาลตำบลตลาดไชยา	21.00	5,485	261.19
18.	Tha Chang Town	เทศบาลตำบลท่าฉาง	7.60	4,796	631.05
19.	Phanom Town	เทศบาลตำบลพนม	20.29	4,866	239.82
20.	Ban Chiaw Lan Town	เทศบาลตำบลบ้านเชียวหลาน	317.00	4,194	13.23
21.	Ko Pha-ngan Town	เทศบาลตำบลเกาะพะงัน	12.65	4,497	355.49
22.	Bang Sawan Town	เทศบาลตำบลบางสวรรค์	13.00	3,317	255.15
23.	Tha Chana Town	เทศบาลตำบลท่าชนะ	6.93	2,944	424.81
24.	Ban Na Town	เทศบาลตำบลบ้านนา	4.08	3,003	736.02
25.	Yan Din Daeng Town	เทศบาลตำบลย่านดินแดง	1.00	2,370	2,370.00
26.	Tha Khanon Town	เทศบาลตำบลท่าขนอน	2.79	1,831	656.72
27.	Khao Wong Town	เทศบาลตำบลเขาวง	15.00	1,983	132.2
28.	Kian Sa Town	เทศบาลตำบลเคียนซา	2.04	1,640	803.92
