= Khao Phanom Baek railway station =

Railway station in Thailand

Coordinates: 9.4706°N 99.1792°E

Khao Phanom Baek เขาพนมแบก
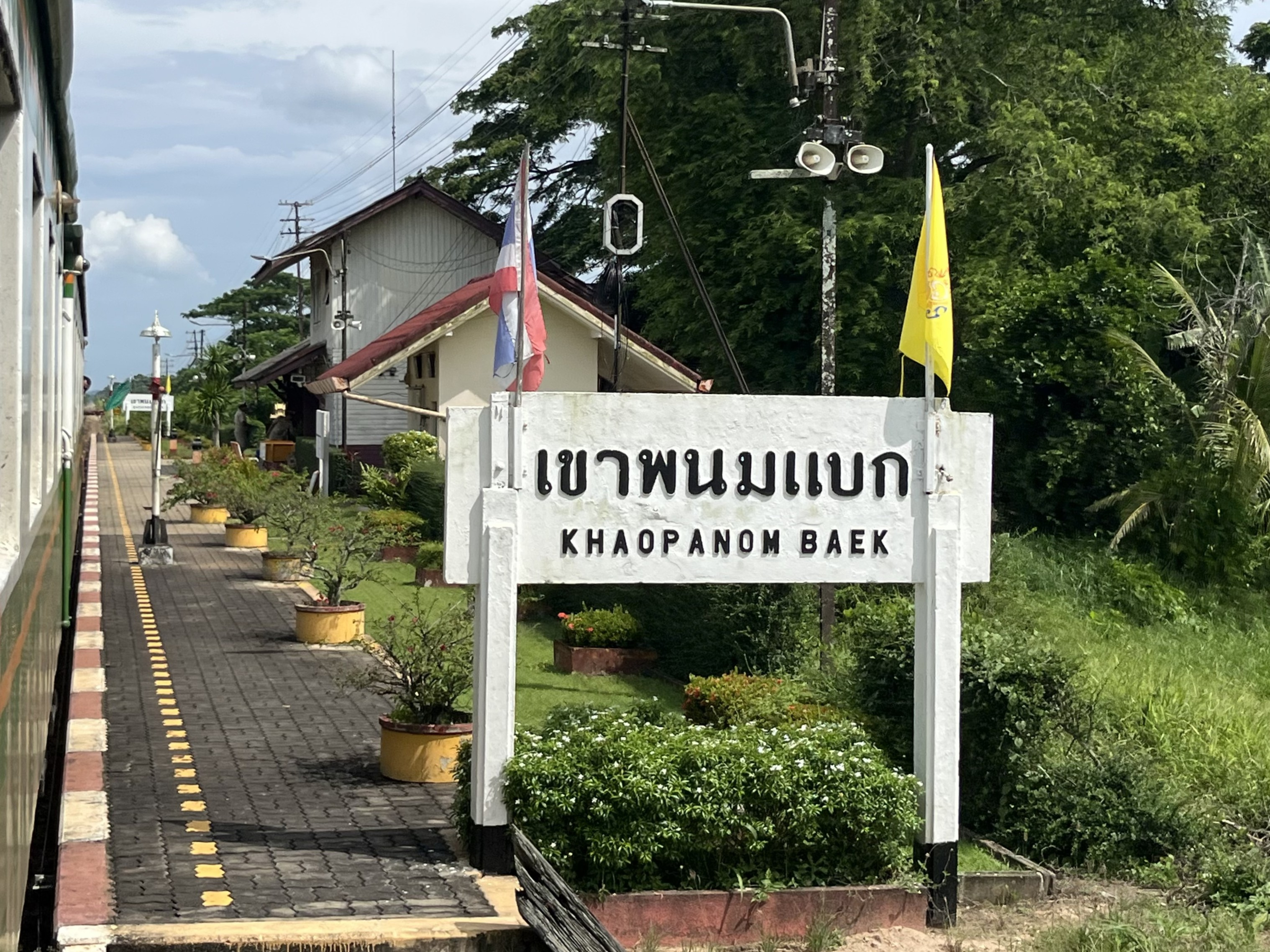

General information
- Location: Surat Thani Local Road No. 2063, Mu 4 (Ban Khao Phanom Baek), Pa We Subdistrict, Chaiya District, Surat Thani
- Owner: State Railway of Thailand
- Line: Southern Line
- Platforms: 1
- Tracks: 2

Other information
- Station code: ขบ.

Services
Preceding station	State Railway of Thailand	Following station
Ban Ko Muk Halt towards Hua Lamphong or Krung Thep Aphiwat	Southern Line	Chaiya towards Su-ngai Kolok
Location

Khao Phanom Baek railway station is a railway station located in Pa We Subdistrict, Chaiya District, Surat Thani. It is a class 3 railway station located 588.401 km (365.6 mi) from Thon Buri railway station.

== Train services ==
- Local No. 445/446 Chumphon-Hat Yai Junction-Chumphon

== Gallery ==
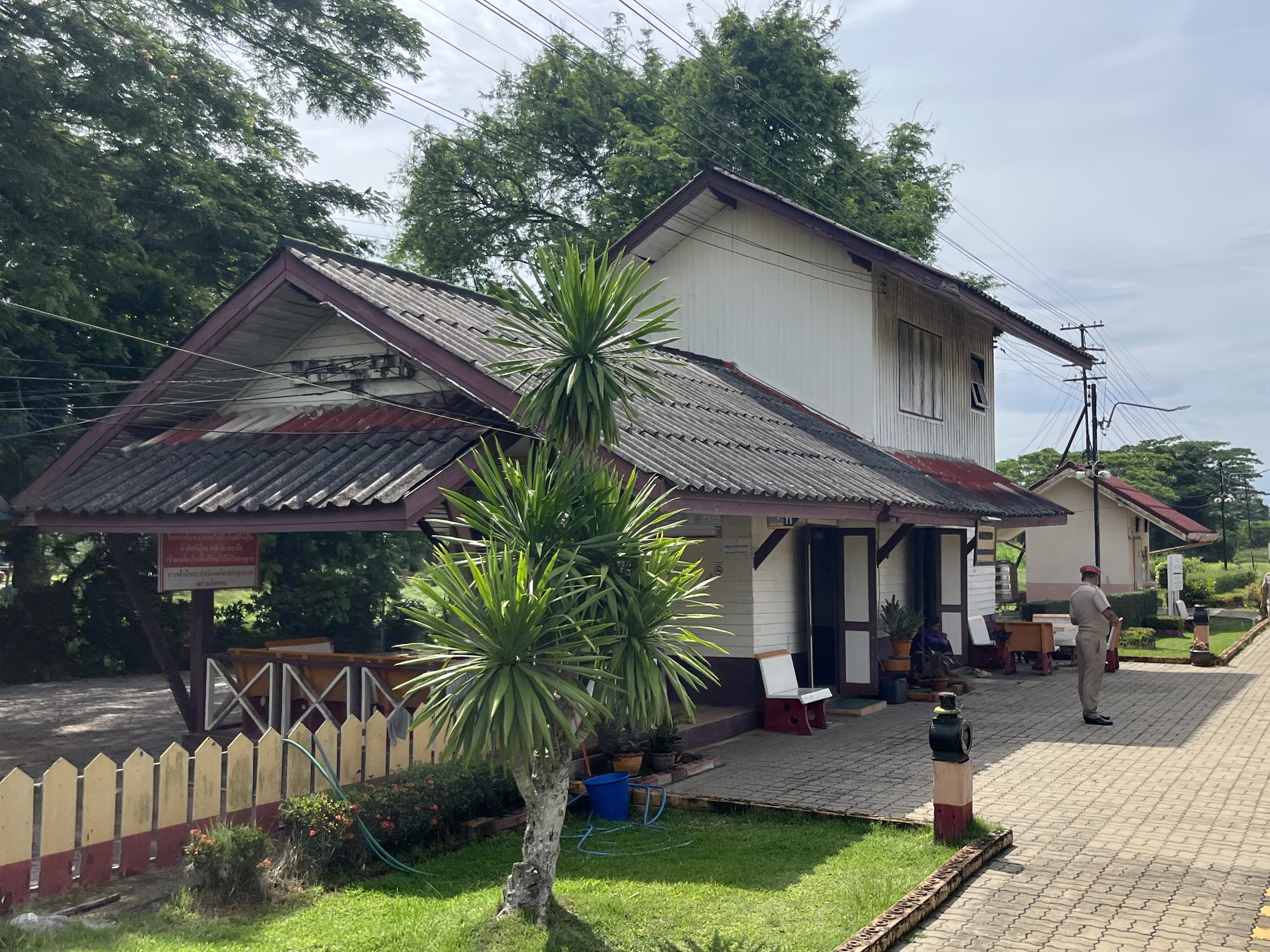
Station building
