= Somporn =

Somporn is a Thai given name. Notable people with the name include:

- Somporn Juangroongruangkit (born 1950/51), Thai businesswoman
- Somporn On-Chim (born 1942), Thai sports shooter
- Somporn Saekhow (1940–2002), Thai farmer
- Somporn Wannaprapa (born 1988), Thai volleyball player
- Somporn Yos (born 1993), Thai footballer
