= Tha Chana railway station =

Railway station in Thailand

Coordinates: 9.5656°N 99.1652°E

Tha Chana ท่าชนะ
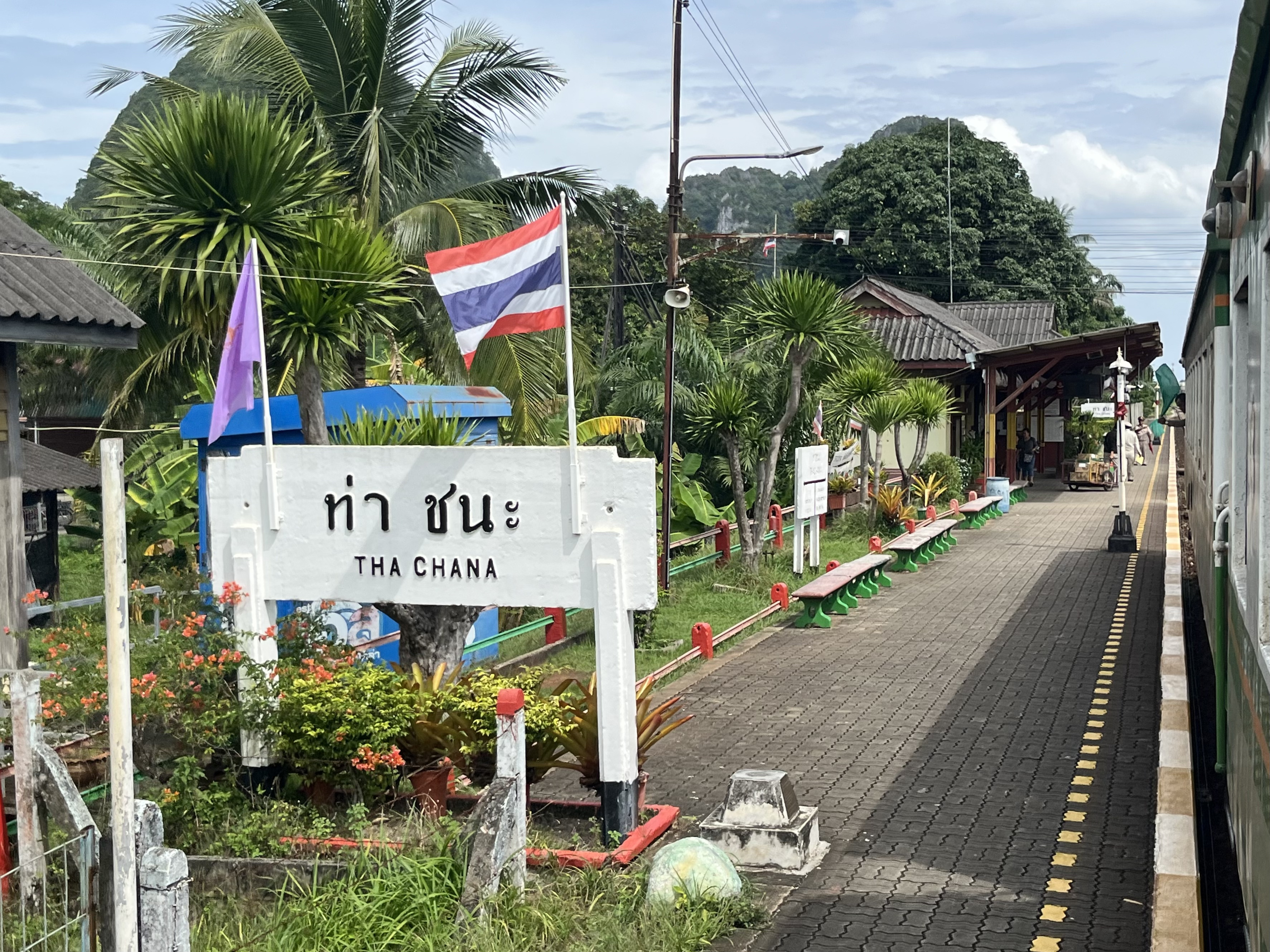
- Tha Chana station in 2026

General information
- Location: Rotfai Road, Tha Chana Subdistrict, Tha Chana District, Surat Thani
- Owner: State Railway of Thailand
- Platforms: 2
- Tracks: 3

Other information
- Station code: นะ.

History
- Former names: Nong Wai

Services
Preceding station	State Railway of Thailand	Following station
Don Thup towards Hua Lamphong or Krung Thep Aphiwat	Southern Line	Ban Ko Muk Halt towards Su-ngai Kolok
Location

Tha Chana railway station is a railway station located in Tha Chana Subdistrict, Tha Chana District, Surat Thani. It is a class 2 railway station, located 577.789 km (359.0 mi) from Thon Buri railway station.

== Services ==
- Special Express No. 43 Bangkok-Surat Thani
- Special Express No. 39/40 Bangkok-Surat Thani-Bangkok
- Special Express No. 41 Bangkok-Yala
- Rapid No. 167/168 Bangkok-Kantang-Bangkok
- Rapid No. 171/172 Bangkok-Sungai Kolok-Bangkok
- Rapid No. 173/174 Bangkok-Nakhon Si Thammarat-Bangkok
- Local No. 445/446 Chumphon-Hat Yai Junction-Chumphon

== Gallery ==
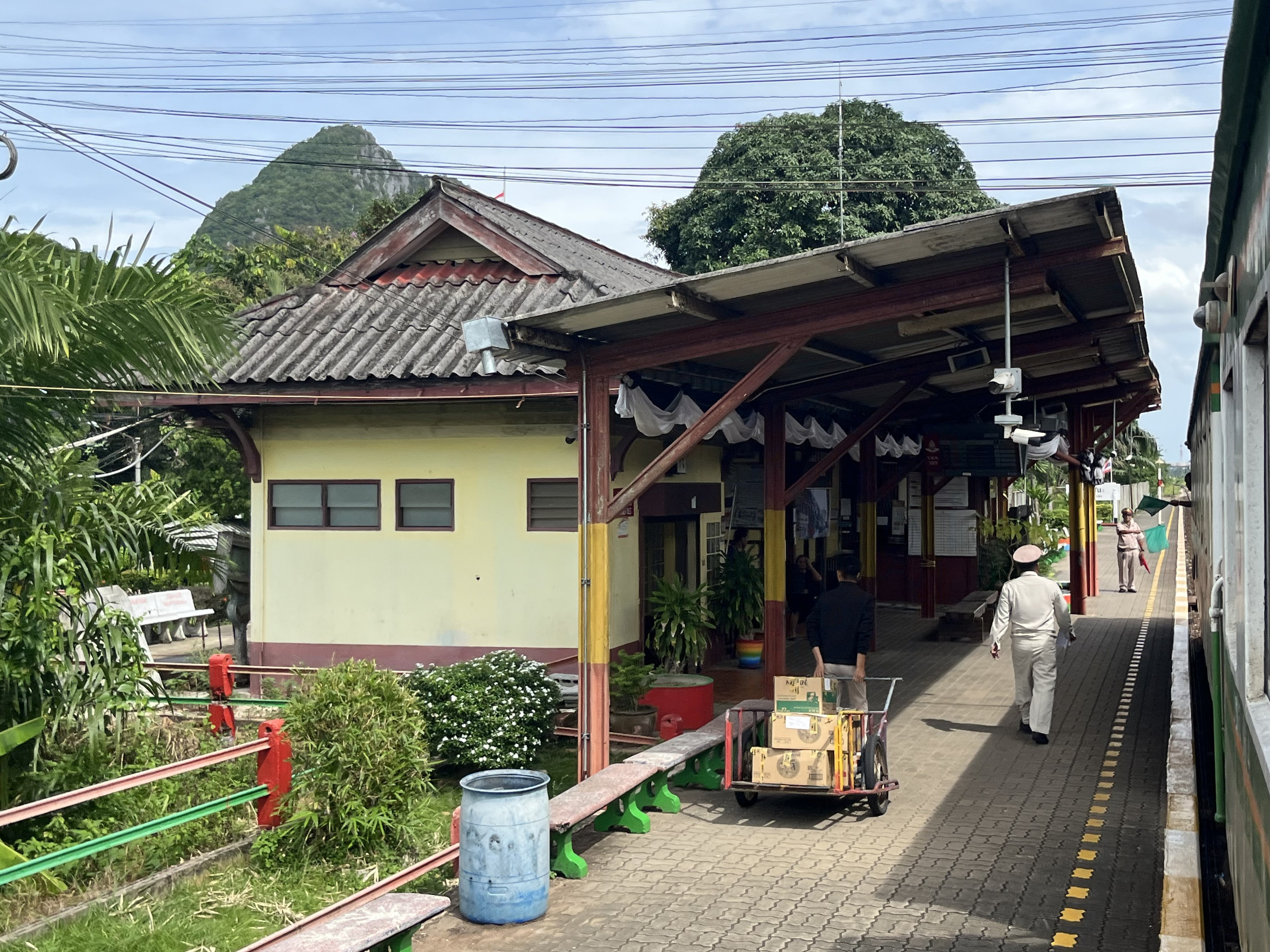
Station building

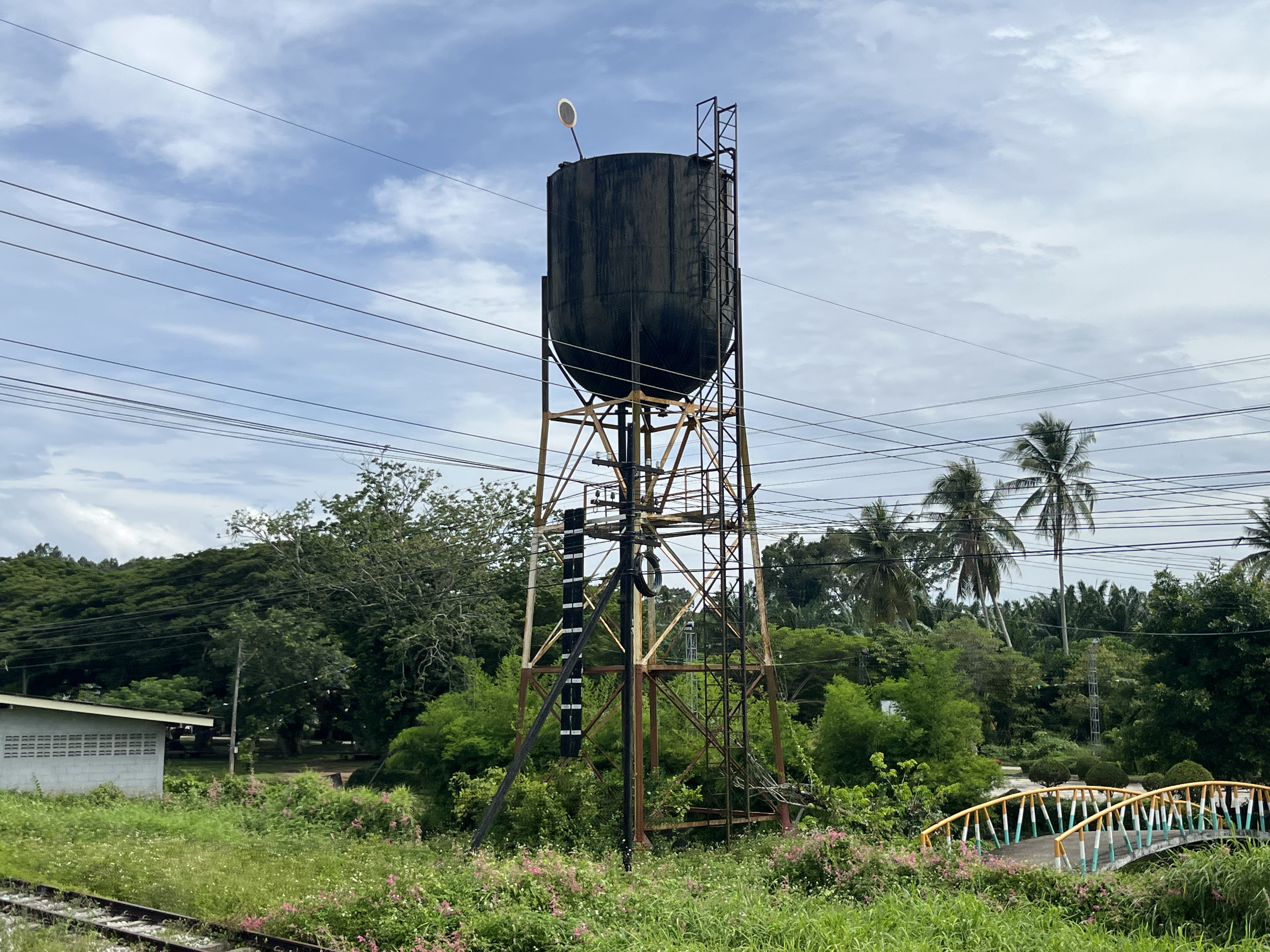
Disused Water Tower
