= Chaiya railway station =

Railway station in Surat Thani, Thailand

Coordinates: 9°23′14″N 99°11′45″E

Chaiya ไชยา
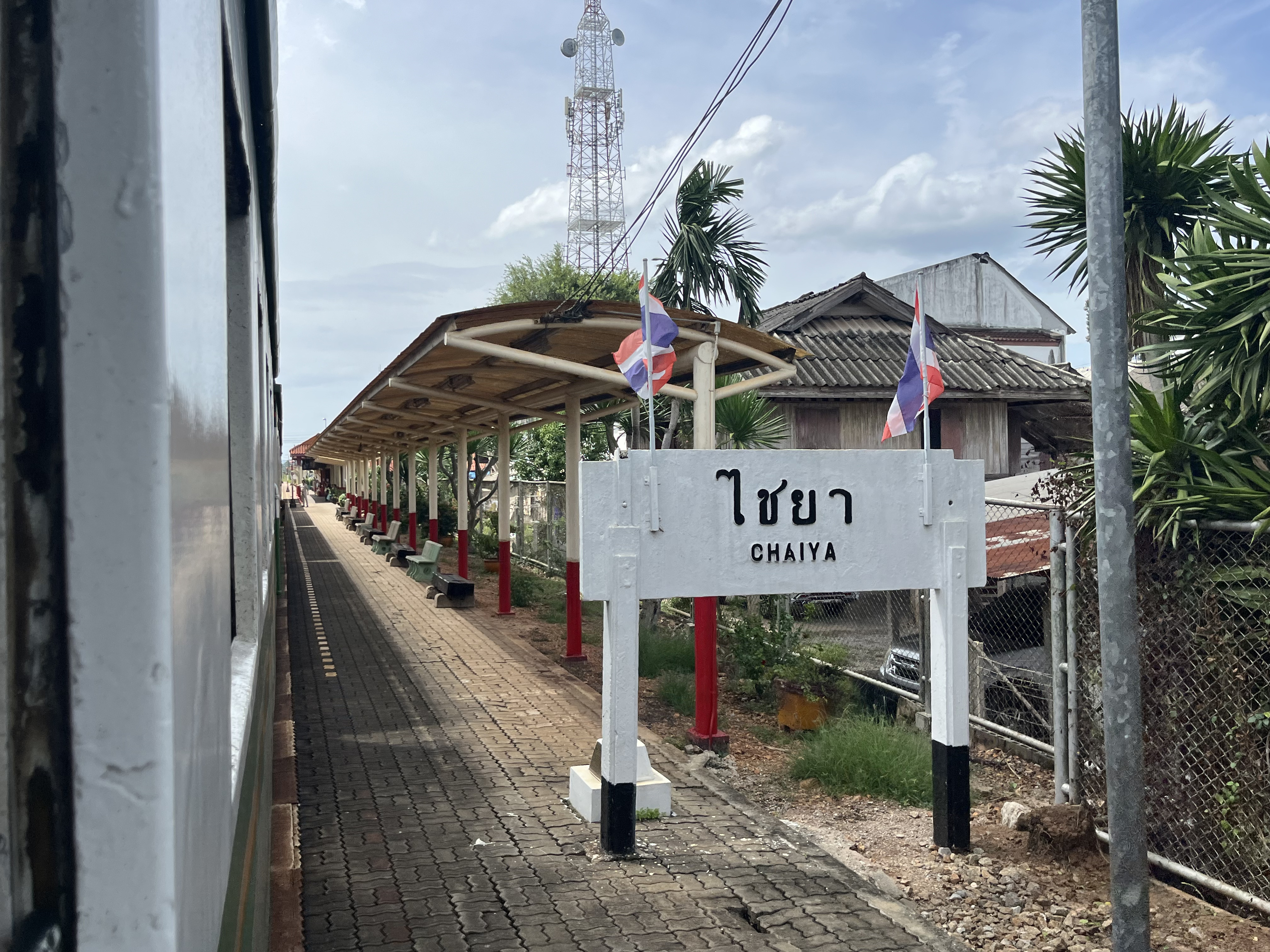

General information
- Location: Chawananan Rd, Talad Chaiya, Chaiya, Surat Thani, 84110
- Owner: State Railway of Thailand (SRT)
- Line: Southern Line
- Platforms: 2
- Connections: Chaiya Bus Service

Construction
- Accessible: yes

Other information
- Station code: ชย.

Passengers
- 64,000

Services
Preceding station	State Railway of Thailand	Following station
Khao Phanom Baek towards Hua Lamphong or Krung Thep Aphiwat	Southern Line	Tha Chang (Surat Thani) towards Su-ngai Kolok
Location

Chaiya station (SRT Code: CIY, Thai: สถานีไชยา) is a railway station in northern Surat Thani Province, Thailand. It is on the State Railway of Thailand (SRT) Southern railway line at km597.751 in Talad Chaiya Town, Chaiya District. It has two tracks in its rail yard, two platforms and has no siding for freight trains.

== History ==
Chaiya Railway Station is one of the oldest railway stations in Southern Thailand. It was opened in 1915 in an area that was later developed into the current Chaiya town. At that time the main settlement was at Phumriang, but many citizens moved to build houses near the new station, creating a settlement that grew to a new town.

Chaiya Railway Station's appearance was improved with repairs in November 2004. It was upgraded to a 2nd class station in May 2005, and upgraded to a 1st class station on 23 July 2010.

== Service ==
As of 2006, Chaiya Railway Station serves 20 train stops and four trains pass per day, all of them served by the SRT.

- Diesel rail special express train No. 39 / 40 Bangkok - Surat Thani - Bangkok
- Diesel rail special express train No. 41 / 42 Bangkok - Yala - Bangkok
- Diesel rail special express train No. 43 / 44 Bangkok - Surat Thani - Bangkok
- Express train No. 83 / 84 Bangkok - Trang - Bangkok
- Express train No. 85 / 86 Bangkok - Nakhon Si Thammarat - Bangkok
- Rapid train No. 167 / 168 Bangkok - Kantang - Bangkok
- Rapid train No. 169 / 170 Bangkok - Yala - Bangkok
- Rapid train No. 171 / 172 Bangkok - Sungai Kolok - Bangkok
- Rapid train No. 173 / 174 Bangkok - Nakhon Si Thammarat - Bangkok
- Local train No. 445 / 446 Chumphon - Hat Yai - Chumphon

== Transportation ==
Many lines of minibuses connect the town of Chaiya and the station with other parts of the district and neighbouring districts, such as Chaiya - Bandon, Chaiya - Phunphin, Chaiya - Phumriang, Chaiya - Tha Chana.
