= Somporn Saekhow =

Thai monkey trainer

Somporn Saekhow (1940 – August 20, 2002, Thai สมพร แซ่โค้ว) was a farmer from Kanchanadit, Surat Thani Province, Thailand, who became famous as a monkey teacher.

As his parents were coconut farmers, Somporn experienced the traditional use of monkeys for the harvest of coconuts. The monkeys were often beaten by their owners when they didn't perform as expected (e.g. when they left ripe coconuts on the tree). This gave him the idea to teach monkeys in a better way. His Buddhist teacher, the famous monk Phra Buddhadasa from the nearby temple Wat Suan Mokkha in Chaiya, encouraged him to teach monkeys in a positive way, without the use of force. In 1957 he started to teach monkeys and developed his unique teaching style.

As it is illegal to catch wild monkeys in Thailand, the students of the monkey school – pig-tailed macaques (Macaca nemestrina) – were brought in by their owners for the education only. In the first step the monkey has to get used to humans, then it will be shown how to turn a coconut. Next the coconut is fixed on a pole, later even higher on a tree. After six months of training they are ready for picking the ripe coconuts from the trees.

In time his school became locally famous, and the largest monkey school of all southern Thailand. In 1993 Somporn together with his favourite monkey Khai Nui carried the provincial flag in the opening ceremony of the National Games held in Surat Thani. At the same time his school became a tourist attraction as well, showing the teaching methods as well as the special performance of his best student.

Somporn died in 2002 after a heart attack. His school is continued by relatives.
