= Talat Chaiya =

Coordinates: 9°23′28″N 99°12′3″E

Talat Chaiya (Thai: ตลาดไชยา, lit. 'Chaiya Market') is the one of two sub-district municipalities (thesaban tambon) in Chaiya District, Surat Thani Province, southern Thailand. It was founded as the center of Chaiya District in 1915 on the area of former Srivijaya city of Chaiya. It covers an area of 21 km^{2} and has a population of 5,549.

== History ==
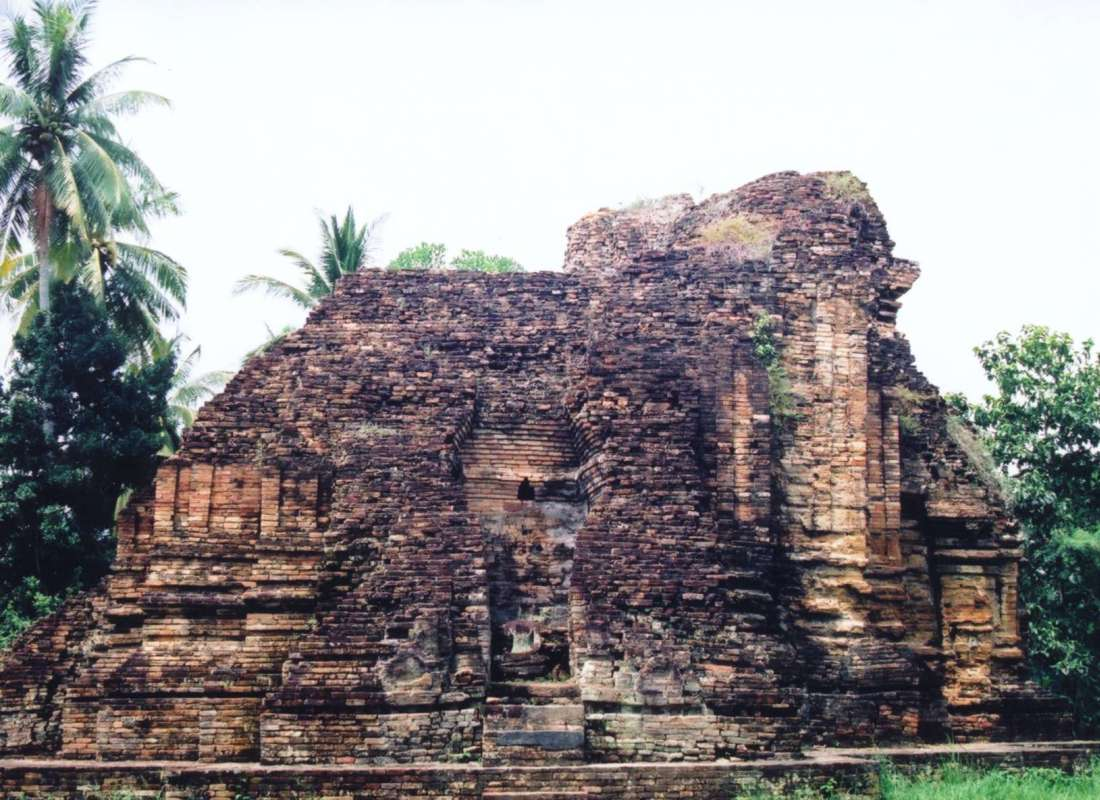
Srivijayan Wat Phra Kaew

Talat Chaiya was built on the east of the Southern Railway in 1915 in the area of sub-district (tambon) Thung. Before that, this area was called Ban Don Rongthong ('golden factory village') because the Chinese from Phumriang (the old city of Chaiya) had built a gold factory there. When the government built the southern railway line passing it and built a railway station, people from Phumriang came to develop the new town on the area near a railway station.

The new town grew fast. The district office, police station, court, and prison were built in the town. Finally, the area was made a separate sub-district, Talat Chaiya in 1938.

In 1956, 4.12 km^{2} of tambon Talat Chaiya was given the status of sanitation district (sukhaphiban), which was enlarged slightly in 1959. It was upgraded to municipal status (thesaban tambon) in 1999 when all sanitary districts became sub-district municipalities. In 2004 it was expanded to cover an area of 21 km^{2} by including the area formerly under the tambon administration organization Talat Chaiya. The town now covers most of tambon Talat Chaiya and part of tambon Lamet.
