= Chaiya district =

Chaiya ไชยา
- District
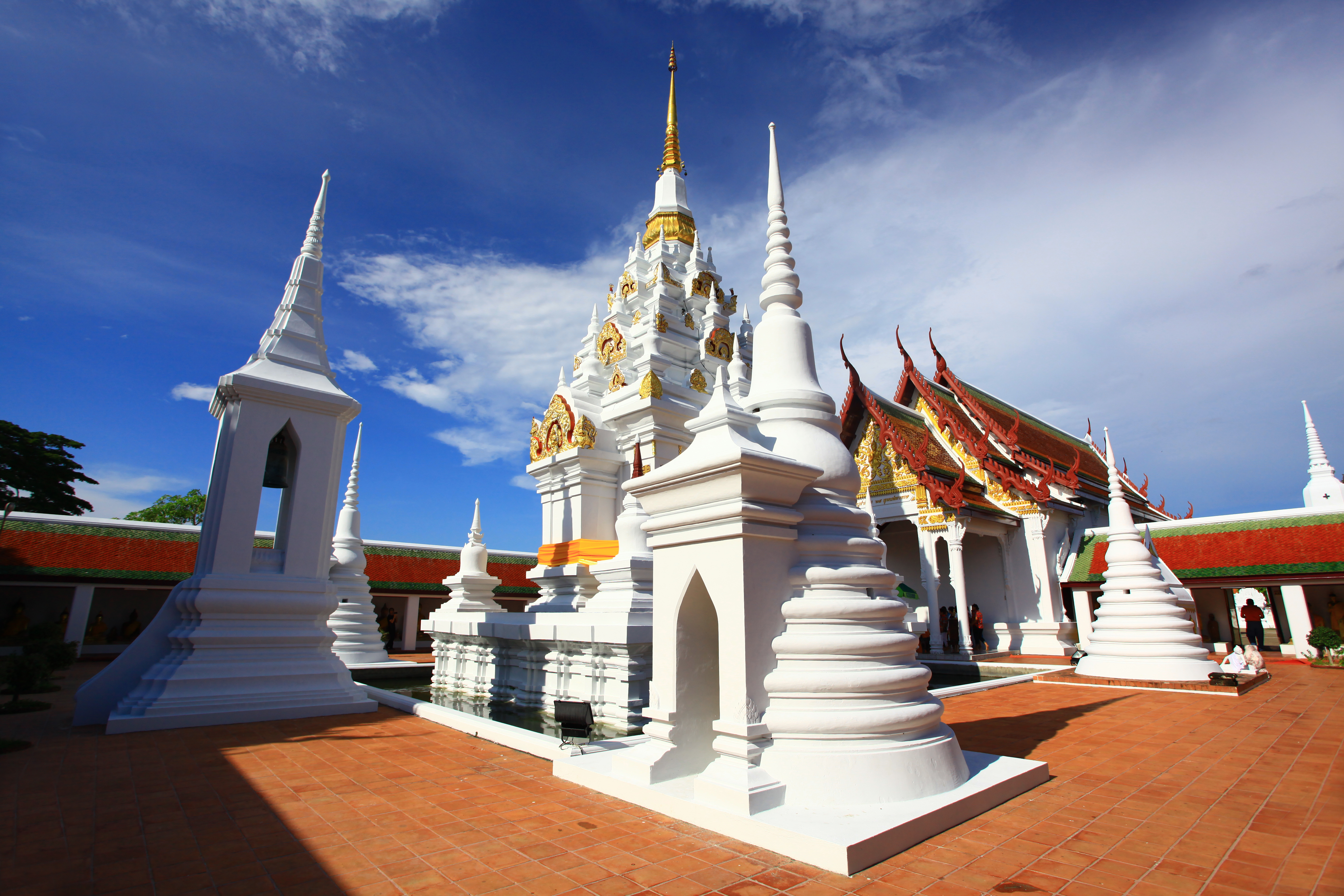
- Wat Phra Boromathat Chaiya

- District location in Surat Thani province

- Location in Thailand
- Coordinates: 9°23′12″N 99°12′0″E
- Country: Thailand
- Province: Surat Thani
- Seat: Talat Chaiya

Area
  - Total: 1,004.63 km^{2} (387.89 sq mi)

Population (2012)
  - Total: 36,996
  - Density: 47.52/km^{2} (123.1/sq mi)
- Time zone: UTC+7 (ICT)
- Postal code: 84110
- Geocode: 8406

Chaiya (Thai: ไชยา, pronounced [tɕʰāj.jāː]) is a former capital district (Amphoe mueang) of Surat Thani province, Southern Thailand. The main town is Talat Chaiya.

== Geography ==
Neighboring districts are (from the south clockwise): Tha Chang and Kapoe of Ranong province; Phato of Chumphon province, and Tha Chana in Surat Thani. To the east is the Gulf of Thailand, with Cape Sui marking the northern end of the Bandon Bay.

The eastern part of the district consists of mostly flat low coastal areas, while to the west are the mountains of the Phuket mountain range, including Kaeng Krung National Park.

== History ==
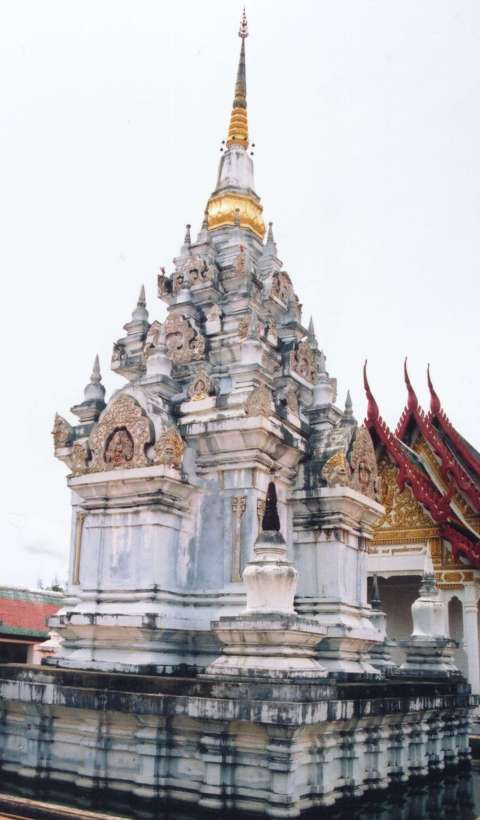
Wat Phra Borommathat

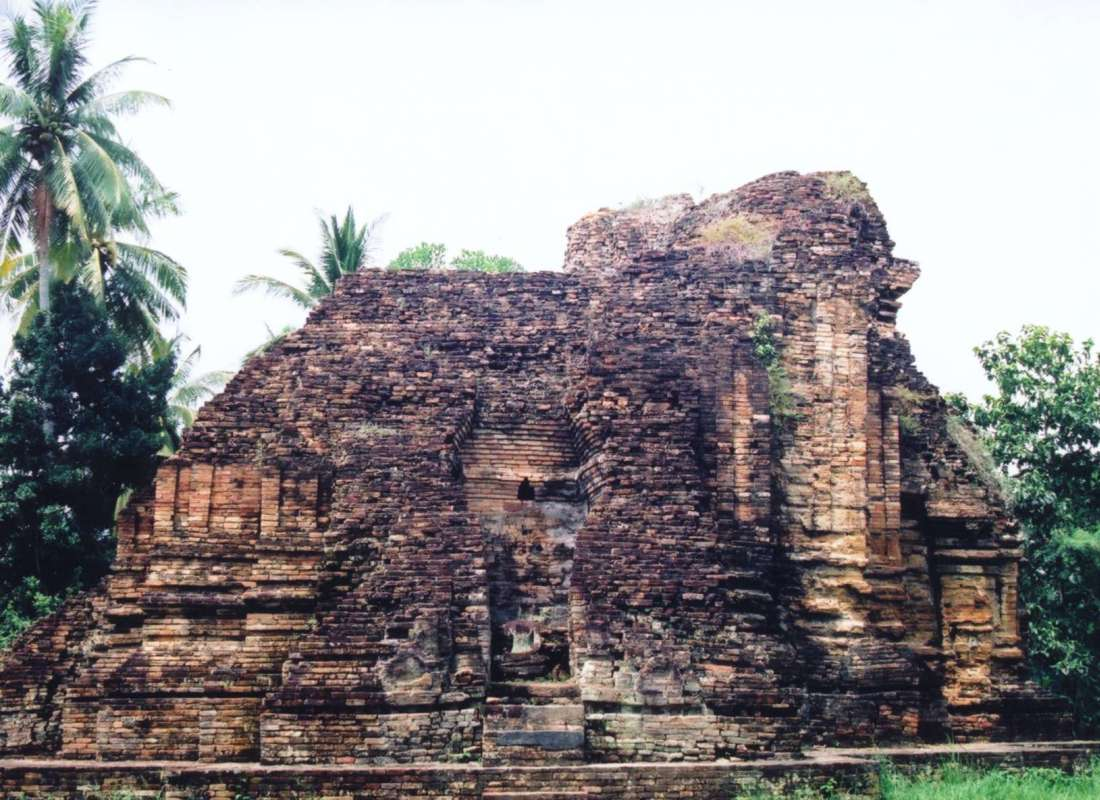
Srivijayan Wat Kaew stupa

Laem Pho Beach in the district is thought to have been a Srivijaya Kingdom seaport in the 7th to 13th centuries. Srivijaya was a Malay city-state that grew to become an influential maritime power in what is now Southeast Asia. Tang dynasty (7th–10th centuries) ceramics have been found in the area as well as pottery from India and glassware from Persia. Similar finds have been made in Ban Thung Tuek, Takua Pa district, Phang Nga province on the other side of the isthmus, 200 km distant, indicating that there may have been an overland route connecting the Gulf of Thailand with the Andaman Seacoast. This route would have enabled traders to avoid piracy in the narrow Strait of Malacca.

The name Chaiya might be derived from its original Malay name cahaya, meaning 'light', 'gleam', or 'glow'. Some scholars identify Chai-ya as coming from Sri-vi- ja-ya.

Wat Phra Borommathat is centered on a reconstructed stupa in Srivijaya-style. The nearby branch of the National Museum has several relics of that time on display. Two more former stupas nearby are now only brick mounds. Inscription 23, as it was labeled by Prince Damrong in his Collected Inscriptions of Siam, is now attributed to Wat Hua Wiang in Chaiya. Dated to the year 697 of the Mahasakkarat era (i.e., 775 CE), the inscription on a Bai Sema shaped stone tells about the King of Srivijaya having erected three stupas at that site and possibly the one at Wat Phra Borom That.

Another important temple near Chaiya is Wat Suan Mohkha Phalaram (also known by the short name Suan Mok, or Wat Than Nam Lai 'Monastery of Flowing Water'), a forest temple. The temple was founded in 1932 by Phra Buddhadasa (1906–1993), a revered Buddhist teacher. In 1959 the temple was relocated to the present 380 rai (150 acres; 0.61 km^{2}) site. These temples are believed to have been used to store rice in large quantities, due to the invading Japanese. These large Buddhist rice temples are rare in the region and only one has been officially labeled as a rice storage temple.

Although, the capital district (Amphoe mueang) of Surat Thani province is Bandon district, the local Surat Thani people generally refer to this district as the capital district and refer to Bandon district as little China of the province.

== Transport ==
Chaiya is on the southern railway line, Chaiya Railway Station is the main railway station of the district. Asian highway AH2 (Thailand Route 41) also passes the city.

== Administration ==
Chaiya district is divided into nine sub-districts (tambons). These are further divided into 54 villages (mubans). There are three sub-district municipalities (thesaban tambons): Talat Chaiya includes most of tambon Talat Chaiya and parts of Lamet; Phumriang the entire tambon Phumriang; Wiang the entire tambon of Wiang. The other six sub-districts each have a tambon administrative organization as their local government.

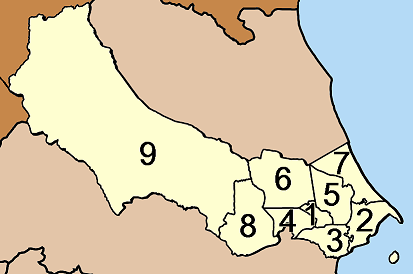
Map of Tambon

No.	Name	Thai	Villages	Pop.
1.	Talat Chaiya	ตลาดไชยา	5	4,818
2.	Phumriang	พุมเรียง	5	7,647
3.	Lamet	เลม็ด	7	5,204
4.	Wiang	เวียง	5	3,730
5.	Thung	ทุ่ง	8	4,983
6.	Pa We	ป่าเว	6	5,188
7.	Takrop	ตะกรบ	5	3,678
8.	Mo Thai	โมถ่าย	6	4,372
9.	Pak Mak	ปากหมาก	7	10,283
