= Surat Thani province =

Surat Thani สุราษฎร์ธานี
- Province
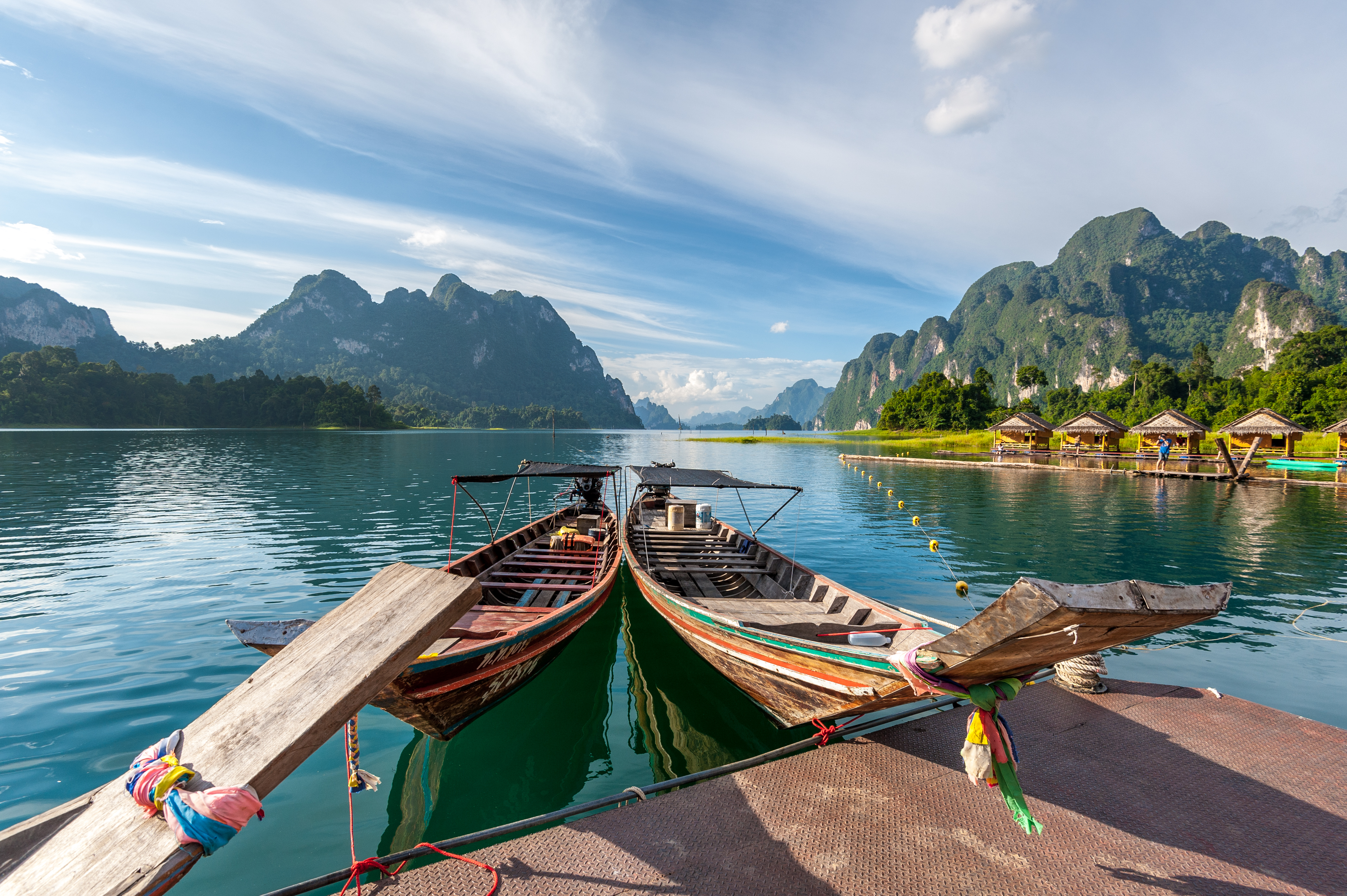
- Khao Sok National Park

- Flag Seal
- Nickname: Surat
- Mottoes: เมืองร้อยเกาะ เงาะอร่อย หอยใหญ่ ไข่แดง แหล่งธรรมะ ("The city of a hundred islands. Delicious rambutans. Large shellfish. Red (salted) eggs. The center of Dharma.")
- Map of Thailand highlighting Surat Thani province
- Coordinates: 9°8′0″N 99°19′54″E
- Country: Thailand
- Capital: Surat Thani

Government
  - Governor: Theerut Supawiboonphol

Area
  - Total: 13,079 km^{2} (5,050 sq mi)
  - Rank: 6th

Population (2024)
  - Total: ▼1,076,666
  - Rank: 20th
  - Density: 82/km^{2} (210/sq mi)
  - Rank: 59th

Human Achievement Index
  - HAI (2022): 0.6438 "average" Ranked 35th

GDP
  - Total: baht 211 billion (US$6.7 billion; 2019)
- Time zone: UTC+7 (ICT)
- Postal code: 84xxx
- Calling code: 077
- ISO 3166 code: TH-84
- Website: suratthani.go.th

Surat Thani Provincial Administrative Organization องค์การบริหารส่วนจังหวัดสุราษฎร์ธานี
- Provincial Administrative Organization
- Interactive map of Surat Thani Provincial Administrative Organization

Government
  - Type: Local administrative divisions
  - Body: Surat Thani Provincial Administrative Organization
  - President: Sopa Kanchana
- Website: suratpao.go.th

Surat Thani (Thai: สุราษฎร์ธานี, pronounced [sù.râːt tʰāː.nīː]), often shortened to Surat, is the largest province (changwat) of Southern Thailand. It lies on the western shore of the Gulf of Thailand. Surat Thani means 'city of good people', a title given to the city by King Vajiravudh (Rama VI); Surat Thani is therefore the sole province in Southern Thailand for which the native name is in the Central Thai language.

The province takes in the islands of Ko Samui, Ko Pha Ngan and Ko Tao, and its mainland districts hold Srivijaya-period remains at Chaiya. Agriculture dominates the provincial economy, coconuts and rubber above all, and the islands carry most of the tourism.

== Geography ==
Surat Thani province is bordered by the provinces of Chumphon to the north, Nakhon Si Thammarat to the east, Krabi to the south, Phang Nga to the southwest, and Ranong to the northwest.

The geographic landscape of Surat Thani is diverse. The central region of the province is dominated by the coastal plain of the Tapi River, characterized by a mix of grassland, rubber trees, palm oil trees, and coconut plantations. To the west lie the limestone mountains of the Phuket range, largely enveloped in forest, home to the renowned Khao Sok National Park. The eastern part of the province sees the commencement of the Nakhon Si Thammarat (or Bantat) mountain range, a portion of which is preserved within Tai Rom Yen National Park. The total forest area in Surat Thani is approximately 3,764 km^{2} (1,453 mi^{2}), accounting for 28.8 percent of the province's area.

Several islands in the Gulf of Thailand are part of Surat Thani, including popular tourist destinations such as Ko Samui, Ko Pha Ngan and Ko Tao, as well as the Ko Ang Thong Marine National Park.

The province is also defined by its main waterways, the Tapi River and the Phum Duang River, which converge near the town of Tha Kham before emptying into Bandon Bay. The delta formed by these rivers, known locally as Nai Bang (ในบาง), is situated directly north of Surat Thani city. This delta features a network of channels interspersed with small islands, predominantly covered by mangroves and orchards.

=== National parks ===
The province has eight national parks. Six are in region 4 (Surat Thani) of Thailand's protected areas, and Hat Khanom–Mu Ko Thale Tai and Namtok Si Khit are in region 5 (Nakhon Si Thammarat). (Visitors in fiscal year 2024)

Khao Sok National Park	739 km^{2} (285 sq mi)	(424,376)
Kaeng Krung National Park	541 km^{2} (209 sq mi)	(1,673)
Tai Rom Yen National Park	425 km^{2} (164 sq mi)	(13,875)
Khlong Phanom National Park	410 km^{2} (160 sq mi)	(4,017)
Hat Khanom–Mu Ko Thale Tai National Park	312 km^{2} (120 sq mi)	(35,585)
Namtok Si Khit National Park	145 km^{2} (56 sq mi)	(14,293)
Mu Ko Ang Thong National Park	102 km^{2} (39 sq mi)	(203,066)
Than Sadet–Ko Pha-ngan National Park	43 km^{2} (17 sq mi)	(73,772)

- Mu Ko Ang Thong National Park is a marine national park in the Gulf of Thailand. It covers 42 islands and a total area of 102 km^{2}, of which about 50 km^{2} are land and the rest is water. The park was established on 12 November 1980. The northern tip of Ko Phaluai is also part of the marine park. There is a ranger station, bungalows, a shop, and a restaurant at Ao Phi Beach on Ko Wua Talap.
- Khao Sok National Park is the largest area of virgin forest in southern Thailand and is a remnant of rain forest which is older and more diverse than the Amazon rainforest.

=== Wildlife sanctuaries ===
The province's two wildlife sanctuaries, with five others, make up region 4 (Surat Thani) of Thailand's protected areas.

Khlong Saeng Wildlife Sanctuary	1,155 km^{2} (446 sq mi)
Khlong Yan Wildlife Sanctuary	488 km^{2} (188 sq mi)

Location protected areas of Surat Thani

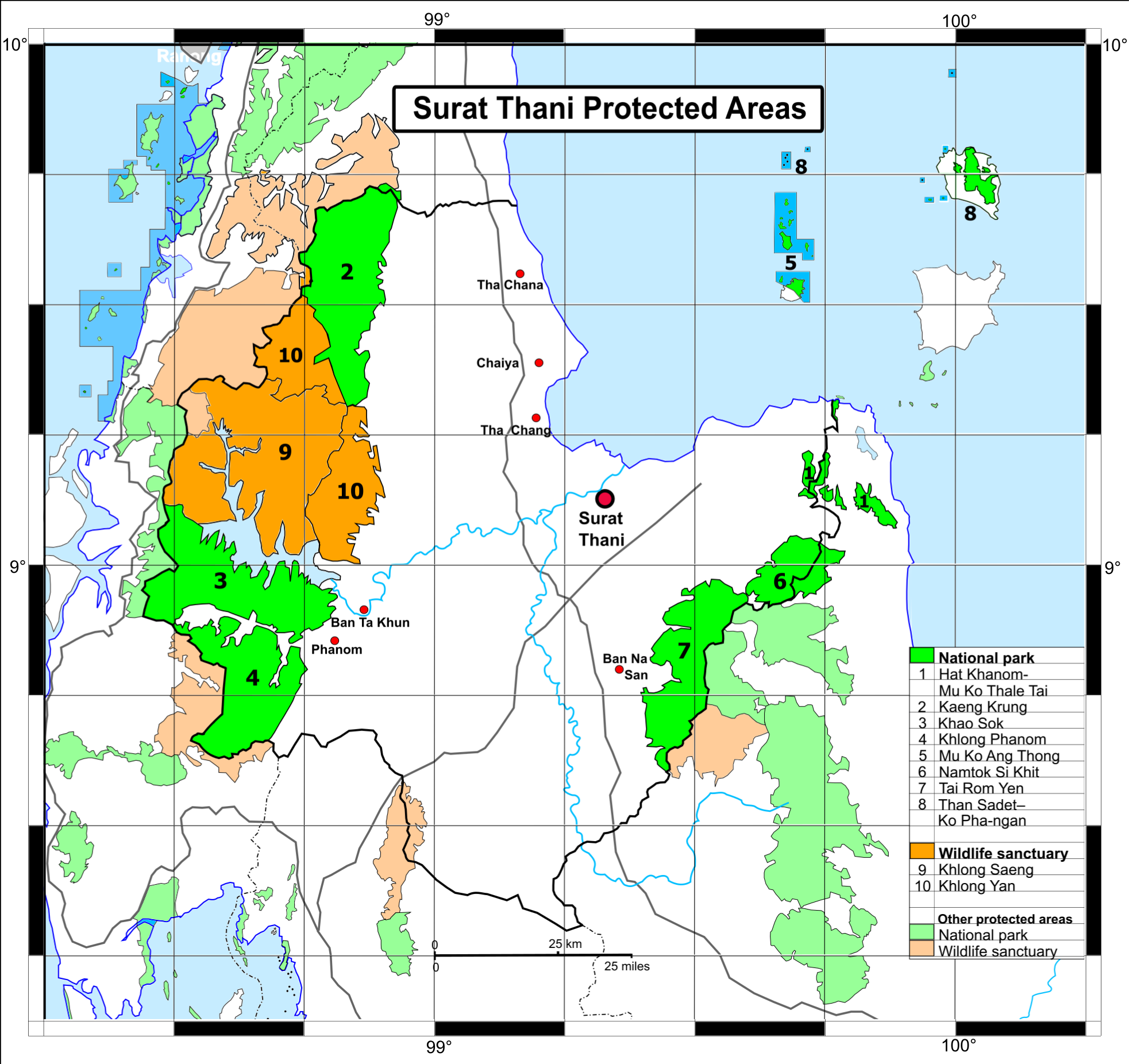
Surat Thani protected areas

	National park
1	Hat Khanom-Mu Ko Thale Tai
2	Kaeng Krung
3	Khao Sok
4	Khlong Phanom
5	Mu Ko Ang Thong
6	Namtok Si Khit
7	Tai Rom Yen
8	Than Sadet–Ko Pha-ngan

	Wildlife sanctuary
9	Khlong Saeng
10	Khlong Yan

== History ==
Historical affiliations

Tambralinga before 1277
Kingdom of Nakhon Si Thammarat 1277–1782
Kingdom of Siam 1782–1932
Kingdom of Thailand 1932–present

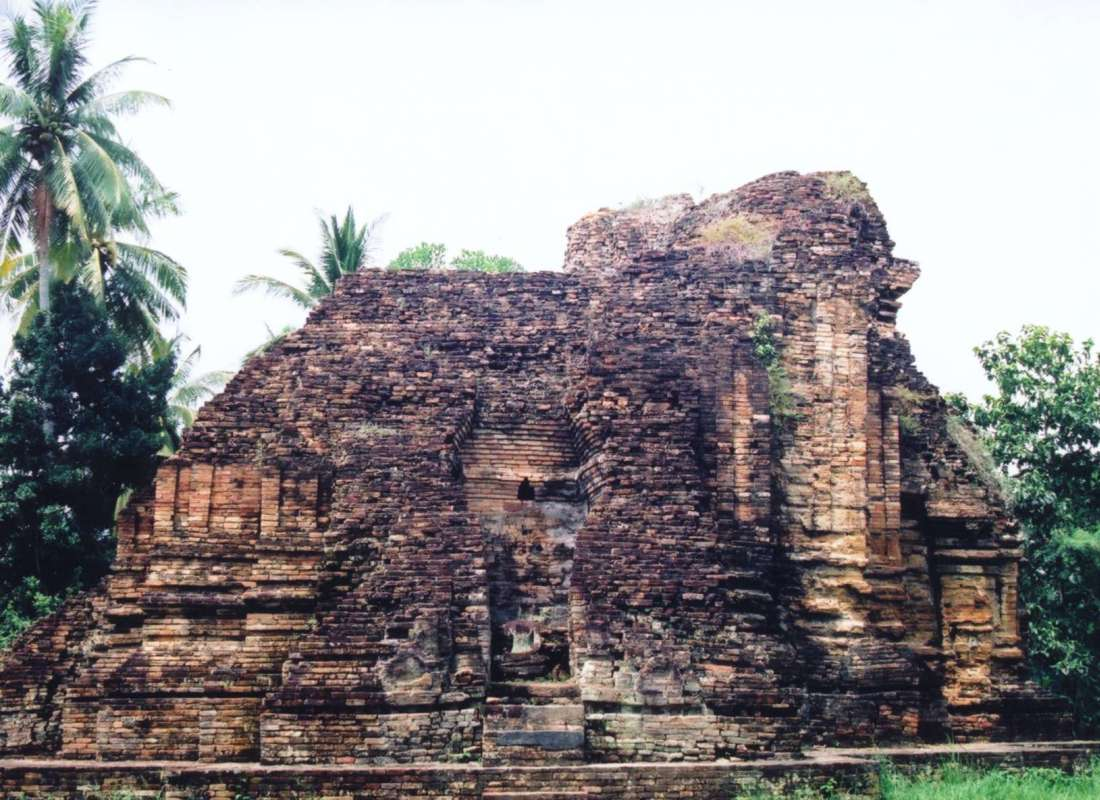
Wat Kaew in Chaiya, dating from Srivijavan times.

The region of Surat Thani has a long history of human habitation, dating back to prehistoric times. It was initially inhabited by indigenous Semang and Malayan tribes. Hsiao-chun Hung and Peter Bellwood report that Wilhelm Solheim found pottery in Ko Din Cave on Ko Samui resembling the incised and stamped wares of Kalanay Cave in the central Philippines. A French-Thai team has since recovered the same pottery at Khao Sam Kaeo and in caves in Chumphon province. The area later came under the influence of the Srivijaya kingdom, which held much of the Malay Peninsula until the 13th century. The city of Chaiya, located in modern-day Surat Thani, is home to several archaeological ruins from the Srivijaya period, indicating its historical significance. There is a belief among some Thai historians that Chaiya may have served as a regional, or possibly even the primary capital of the Srivijaya kingdom, although this assertion remains a subject of scholarly debate. The Ligor inscription, a stela whose face A was issued by a Śrīvijayan king in 775, is attributed either to Chaiya or to Nakhon Si Thammarat, and which of the two is unsettled. Another notable settlement from this era was Wiang Sa, which also played a significant role during the time of Srivijaya's dominance.

Laem Pho, in Chaiya, is among the places where gold-glass beads have been recorded. Saritpong Khunsong lists it with the gold-imitation glass beads that Peter Francis traced to workshops at Siraf, at Berenike in Egypt and at Thung Tuek in Phang-nga. Among the finds at the same port are Changsha bowls carrying Arabic characters, which Natthapong Matsong reads as goods ordered through middlemen at the local harbour. Inland, the hill of Khao Si Wichai in Phun Phin carried Shaiva, Vaishnava and Mahayana buildings together, and thermoluminescence and radiocarbon dates for four of its brick monuments fall between 809 and 985. A bronze Buddha of Amaravati type, dated to the 4th or 5th century, comes from Khuan Phun Phin.

Following the decline of the Srivijaya kingdom, the region was partitioned into the cities (mueang) of Chaiya, Thatong (present-day Kanchanadit), and Khirirat Nikhom. Chaiya was governed directly from the Thai capital, whereas Thatong and Khirirat Nikhom came under the jurisdiction of the Nakhon Si Thammarat Kingdom. In 1899, these cities were amalgamated to form a single province named Chaiya.

In 1915 the capital city of the Monthon Chumphon was relocated from the district of Chaiya to Bandon. During a visit by King Vajiravudh (Rama VI) on 29 July 1915, Bandon was renamed Surat Thani, a change possibly inspired by the major port city of Surat in Gujarat, India. Concurrently, the Monthon was also renamed Surat. In 1926, this Monthon was abolished and integrated into Monthon Nakhon Si Thammarat. Following the dissolution of the monthon system in 1933, Surat Thani was established as a first-level administrative division, gaining the status of a province.

The administrative headquarters of Surat Thani province were originally housed in a building located in Tha Kham, within the Phunphin District. Before World War II, the administrative center was relocated to the city of Surat Thani, situated along the Tapi River. This river shares its name with the Tapi River in Surat, located in the southern region of Gujarat, India.

During the Japanese invasion of Thailand on 8 December 1941, the administrative building in Surat Thani was destroyed amidst the conflict that engulfed the city. The building was eventually reconstructed in 1954. However, on 19 March 1982, the building was targeted in a bombing by communist insurgents, resulting in its destruction and the tragic loss of five lives.

Following this incident, a new provincial administration building was constructed at a different location, south of the city center. The site of the former provincial hall has since been repurposed and now hosts the city pillar shrine (Lak Mueang). This third and current administrative building continues to serve as the provincial government's headquarters.

== Symbols ==
The provincial seal of Surat Thani prominently features the pagoda of Wat Phra Borommathat Chaiya, a historic structure believed to have been constructed approximately 1,200 years ago. The design of the provincial flag incorporates the image of this pagoda, set against a background divided horizontally with orange on the top half and yellow on the bottom.

Surat Thani's provincial flower is the bua phut (Rafflesia kerrii), noted for being a parasitic plant that produces some of the largest flowers among all plant species. The provincial tree is identified as the ton kiam (Cotylelobium melanoxylon). The Rafflesia flower, can be found in Khao Sok National Park in Surat Thani. Asian green arowana (Scleropages formosus) is the provincial aqualtic life because the Cheow Lan Lake in the Rajjaprabha Dam, part of Khao Sok National Park, is the last natural habitat in Thailand for this endangerous living fossil freshwater fish. In addition, this species of fish was first bred in Thailand in 1988 by the Department of Fisheries. The hatchlings were from parents collected from the wild from nearby Khlong Saeng and Khlong Yan Wildlife Sanctuaries.

The slogan of the province is "เมืองร้อยเกาะ เงาะอร่อย หอยใหญ่ ไข่แดง แหล่งธรรมะ" (Mueang roi ko, ngo aroi, hoi yai, khai daeng, laeng thamma), which translates to "city of 100 islands, delicious rambutan, big shells, red eggs, the center of Buddhism". The slogan's reference to shells reflects the prevalence of shellfish, particularly oysters, "red eggs" references salted duck eggs, and the "center of Buddhism" the several religious sites situated in the province, including Wat Phra Borommathat Chaiya and Suan Mokkhaphalaram.

== Administrative divisions ==
Map of nineteen districts

=== Provincial government ===
The province is divided into 19 districts (amphoes), which are further divided into 131 subdistricts (tambons) and 1,028 villages (mubans).

1. Mueang Surat Thani
2. Kanchanadit
3. Don Sak
4. Ko Samui
5. Ko Pha-ngan
6. Chaiya
7. Tha Chana
8. Khiri Rat Nikhom
9. Ban Ta Khun
10. Phanom
11. Tha Chang
12. Ban Na San
13. Ban Na Doem
14. Khian Sa
15. Wiang Sa
16. Phrasaeng
17. Phunphin
18. Chai Buri
19. Vibhavadi

=== Local government ===
As of 26 November 2019 there are: one Surat Thani Provincial Administration Organisation (ongkan borihan suan changwat) and 40 municipal (thesaban) areas in the province. Surat Thani and Ko Samui have city (thesaban nakhon) status. Tha Kham, Na San and Don Sak have town (thesaban mueang) status. Further 35 subdistrict municipalities (thesaban tambon). The non-municipal areas are administered by 97 Subdistrict Administrative Organisations - SAO (ongkan borihan suan tambon).

No.	City	Thai	Population	Notes
1.	Surat Thani	เทศบาลนครสุราษฎร์ธานี	127,550	Provincial capital, main bus station
2.	Ko Samui	เทศบาลนครเกาะสมุย	52,510	Tourism
3.	Tha Kham	เทศบาลเมืองท่าข้าม	20,363	Main railway station, airport
4.	Na San	เทศบาลเมืองนาสาร	19,851
5.	Talat Chaiya	เทศบาลตำบลตลาดไชยา	12,955	Historic town
6.	Don Sak	เทศบาลตำบลดอนสัก	11,357	Main port
7.	Ko Pha Ngan	เทศบาลตำบลเกาะพะงัน	3,357	Tourism

For national elections, the province is divided into two constituencies, each eligible to elect three members of parliament.

== Economy ==
According to the 2008 census, Surat Thani province recorded a Gross Provincial Product (GPP) of 132,637.3 million baht (approximately US$4,019.31 million). The GPP per capita was reported to be 134,427 baht (around US$4,073.54). This marked an increase from the 2007 census, where the GPP was 122,398 million baht (US$3,599.94 million) and the GPP per capita was 125,651 baht (US$3,695.62). These figures indicate a GPP growth rate of 8.37 percent and a per capita growth rate of 6.98 percent.

Agriculture is a large part of the provincial economy. The province is noted for its production of coconuts and rambutan. In the case of coconuts, they are often harvested by specially trained monkeys, predominantly pig-tailed macaques (Macaca nemestrina). The best-known training center for these monkeys was established by the late Somporn Saekhow. Rambutan cultivation in Surat Thani traces its roots back to 1926, initiated by Chinese Malay Mr. K. Vong in the Ban Na San District. The province celebrates its rambutan production with an annual fair held in early August, featuring a parade of elaborately decorated floats on the Tapi River. Additionally, rubber tree plantations are widespread throughout Surat Thani, contributing to its agricultural output.

In terms of fisheries, Surat Thani is widely known as the largest oyster-farming area in Thailand. The species cultivated there is Magallana belcheri, a large oyster that can reach a full weight of more than half a kilogram. The oysters are farmed in the sea on wooden stakes driven into the seabed and are commonly eaten raw. The oyster meat, which remains in one half of the shell, is typically slurped directly from the shell and seasoned with condiments such as lime juice and chili. It is usually eaten together with young leaves of the lead tree (Leucaena leucocephala) to balance the flavor. Surat Thani is therefore regarded as one of the largest centers of large oyster cultivation in Southeast Asia.

Surat Thani province is known for local products such as the hand-woven silk cloth of the coastal village of Phum Riang in Chaiya. The district also produces red eggs. For this specialty, ducks are fed a diet of crabs and fish, and their eggs are subsequently preserved in a mixture of soil and salt, lending them a distinctive flavor and color.

Tourism is a large part of the provincial economy. In 2018 the province earned 64 billion baht from tourism. This figure represented 63 percent of the total tourism income for Surat Thani, with a substantial portion attributable to its island destinations. These include popular tourist spots such as Ko Samui, Ko Pha Ngan, Ko Tao, and Mu Ko Ang Thong National Park, which are major contributors to the province's tourism sector.

== Human achievement index 2022 ==
Health	Education	Employment	Income
30	44	61	31
Housing	Family	Transport	Participation
59	6	21	62
Province Surat Thani, with an HAI 2022 value of 0.6438 is "average", occupies place 35 in the ranking.

Since 2003, United Nations Development Programme (UNDP) in Thailand has tracked progress on human development at sub-national level using the Human achievement index (HAI), a composite index covering all the eight key areas of human development. National Economic and Social Development Board (NESDB) has taken over this task since 2017.

Rank	Classification
1 - 13	"high"
14 - 29	"somewhat high"
30 - 45	"average"
46 - 61	"somewhat low"
62 - 77	"low"

Map with provinces and HAI 2022 rankings

== Gallery ==
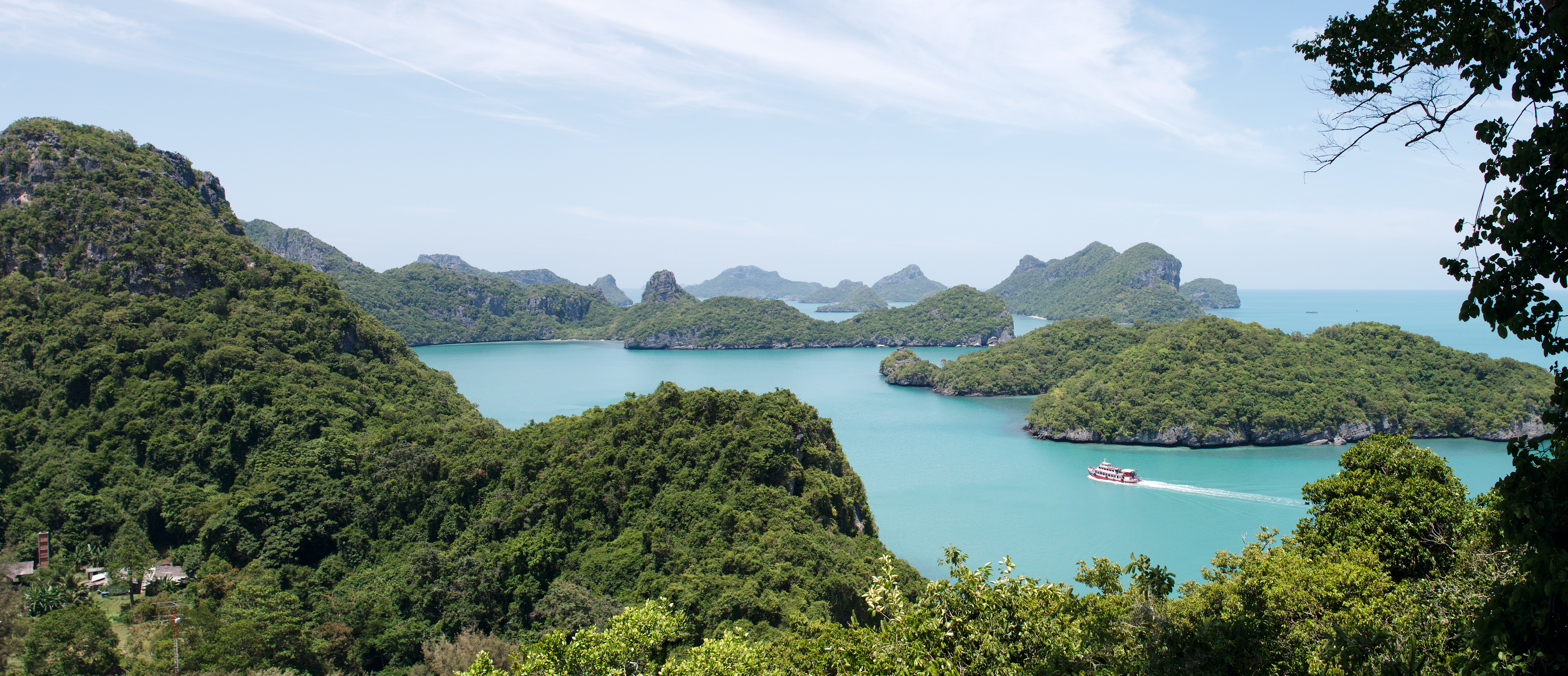
Ang Thong National Park from Ko Wua Ta Lap Island

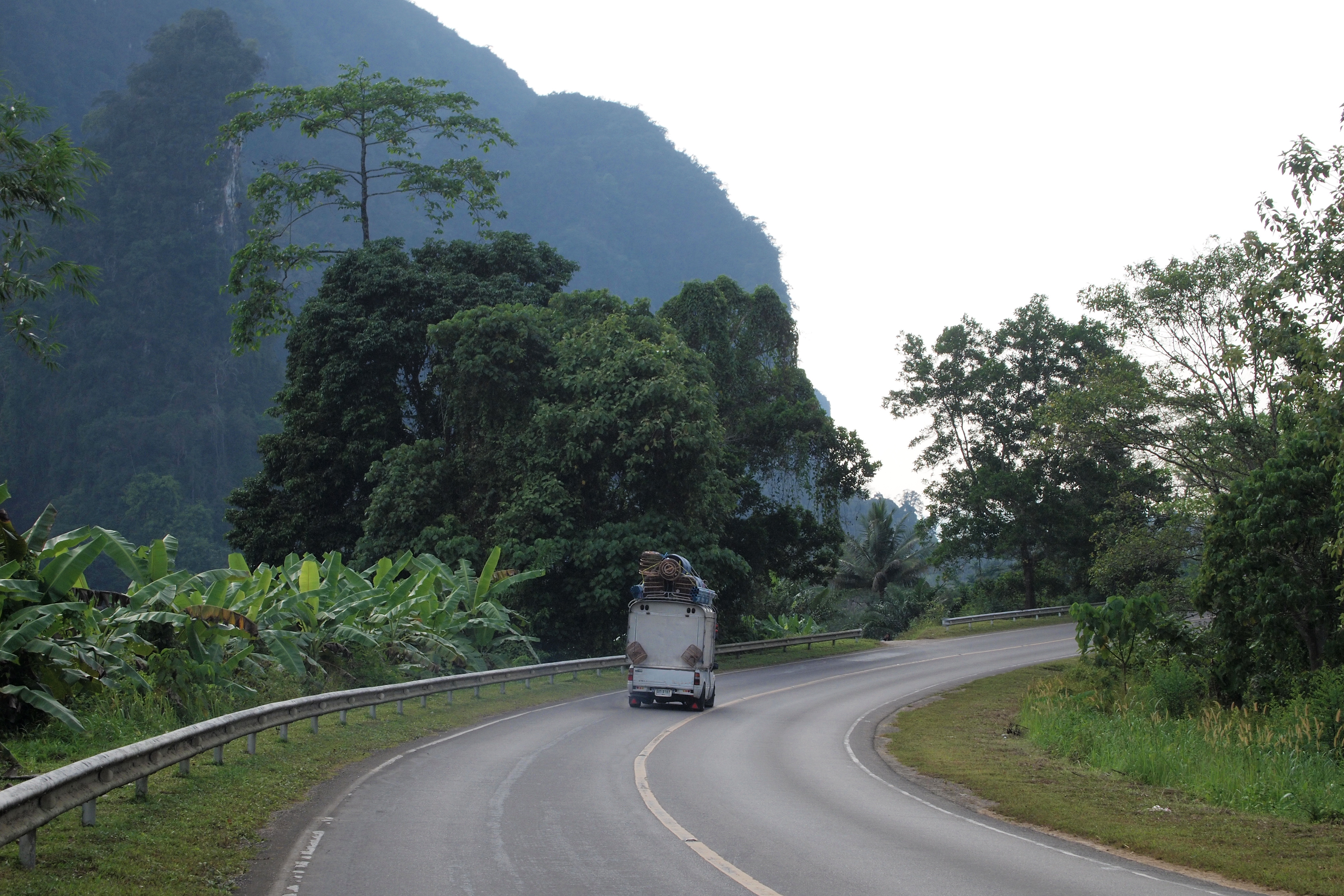
Khlong Phanom National Park

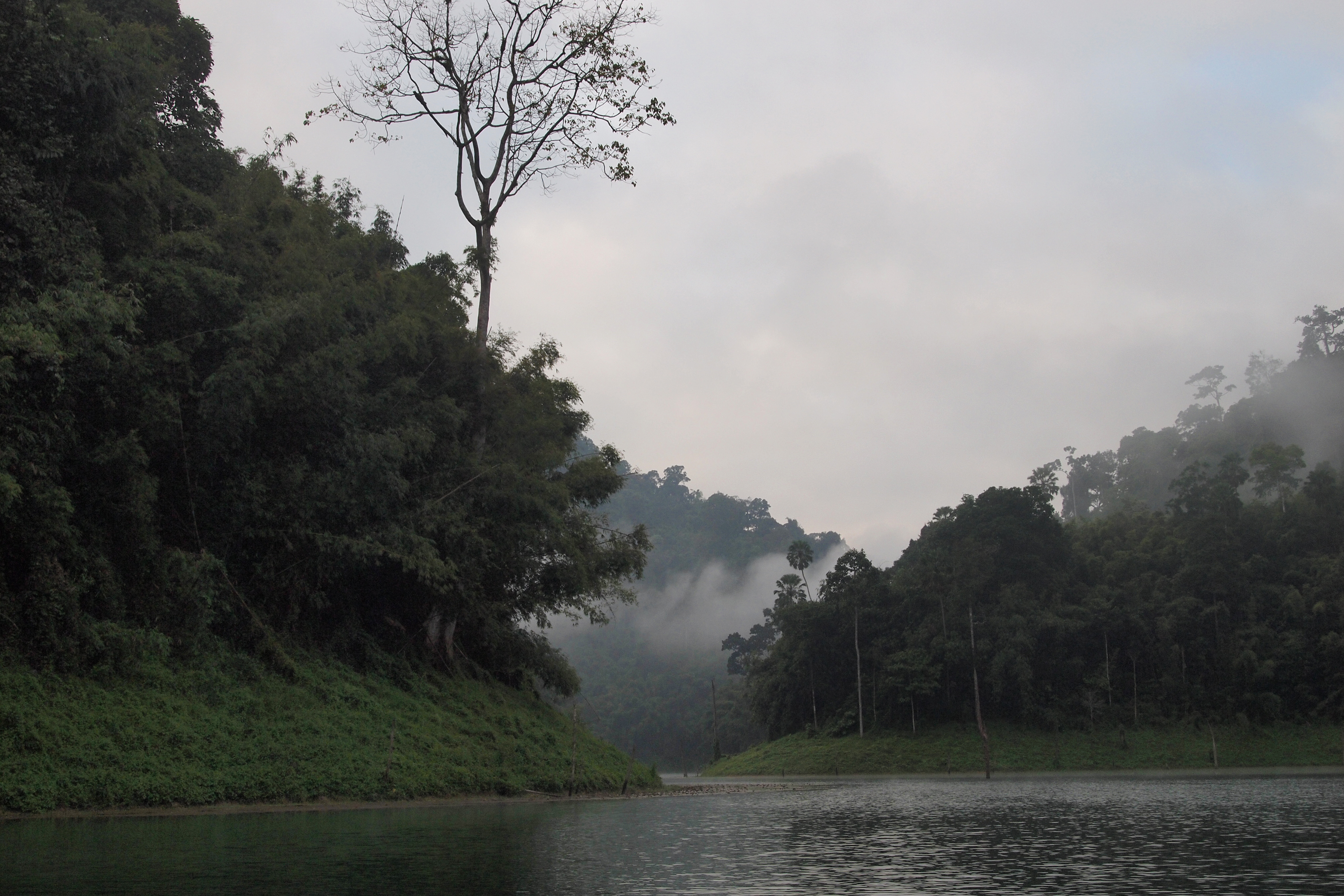
Primary tropical rainforest around Cheow Lan Lake

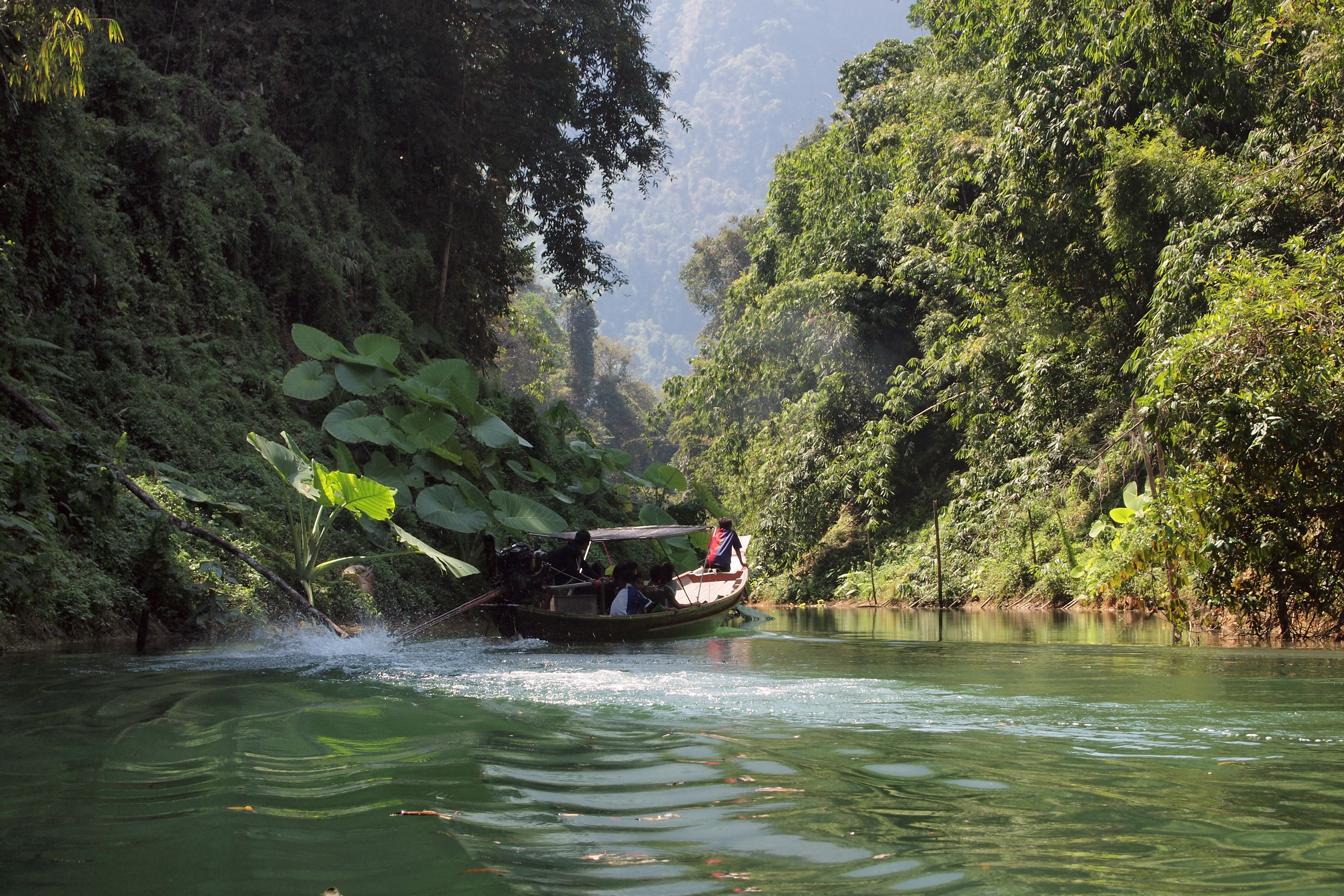
The shore of Cheow Lan Lake

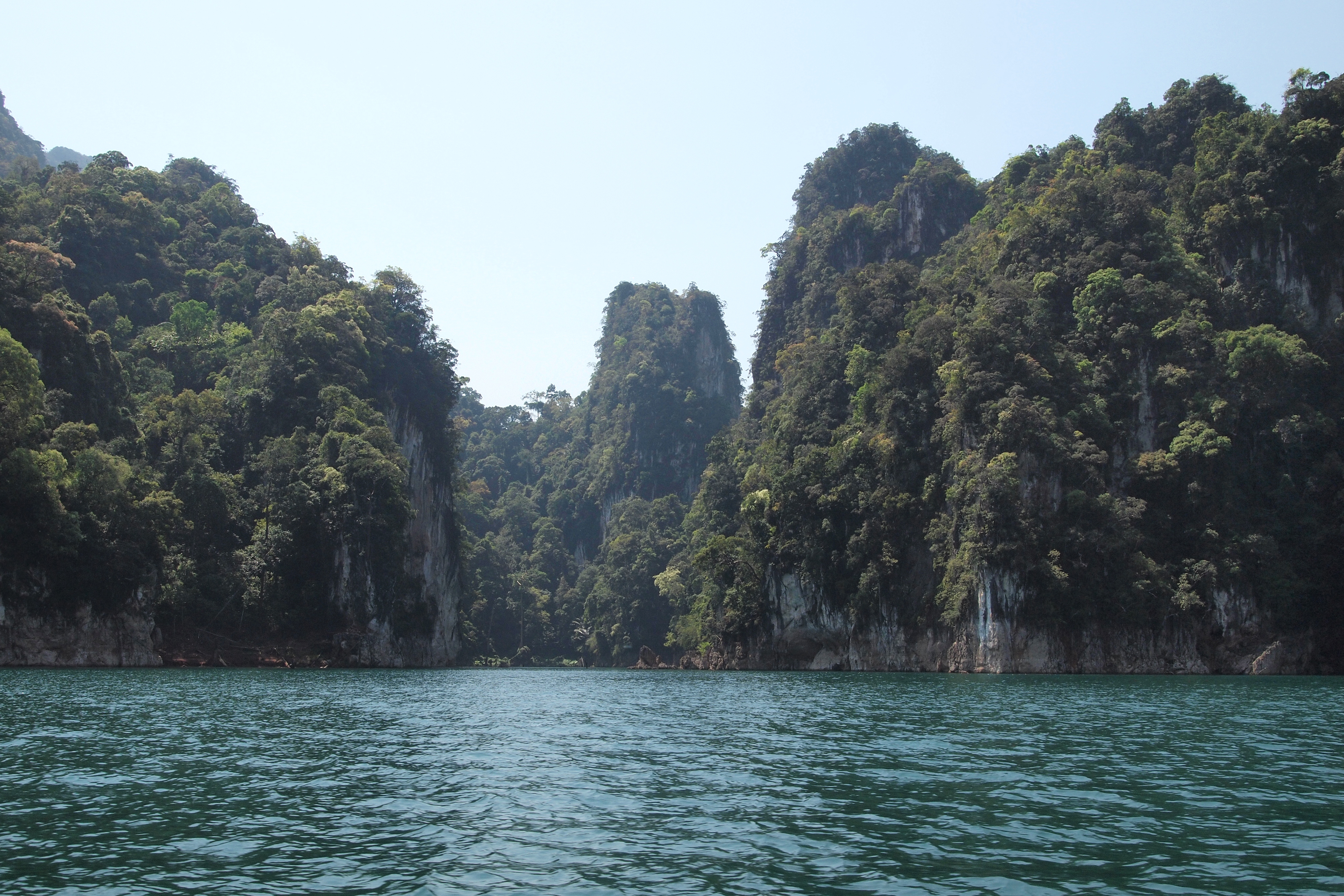
Limestone rock formations on Cheow Lan Lake

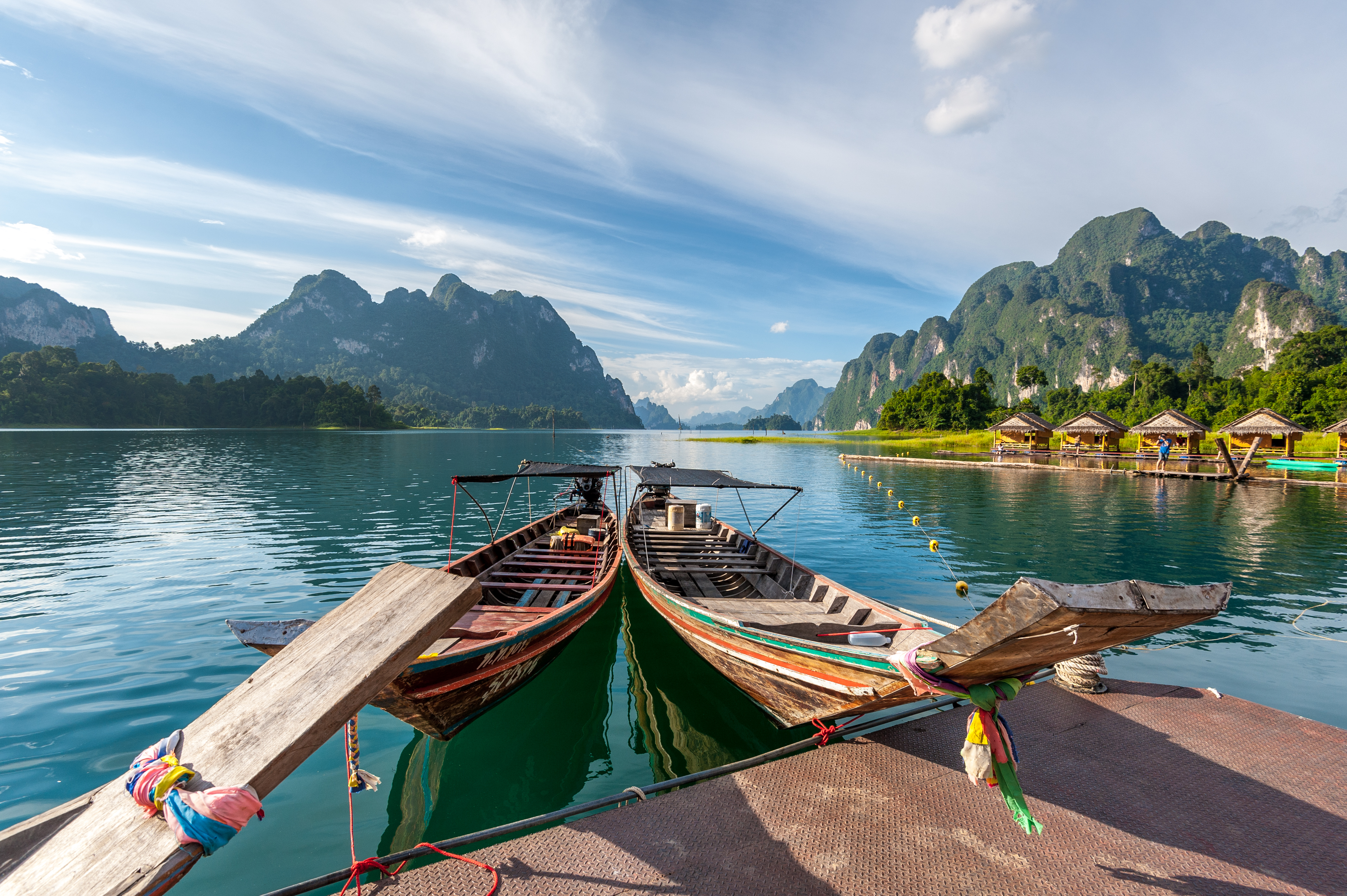
Khao Sok National Park

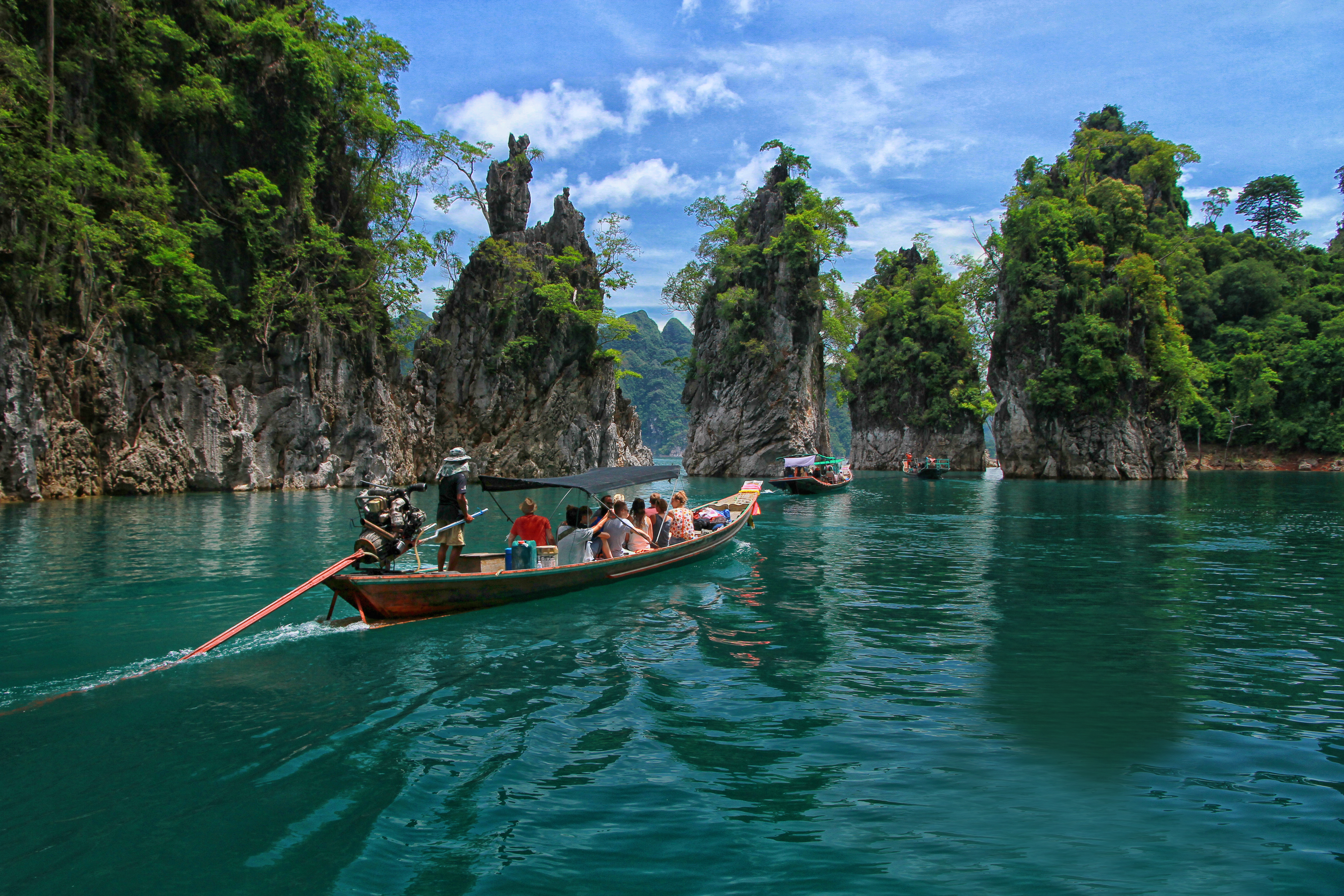
Khao Sok National Park

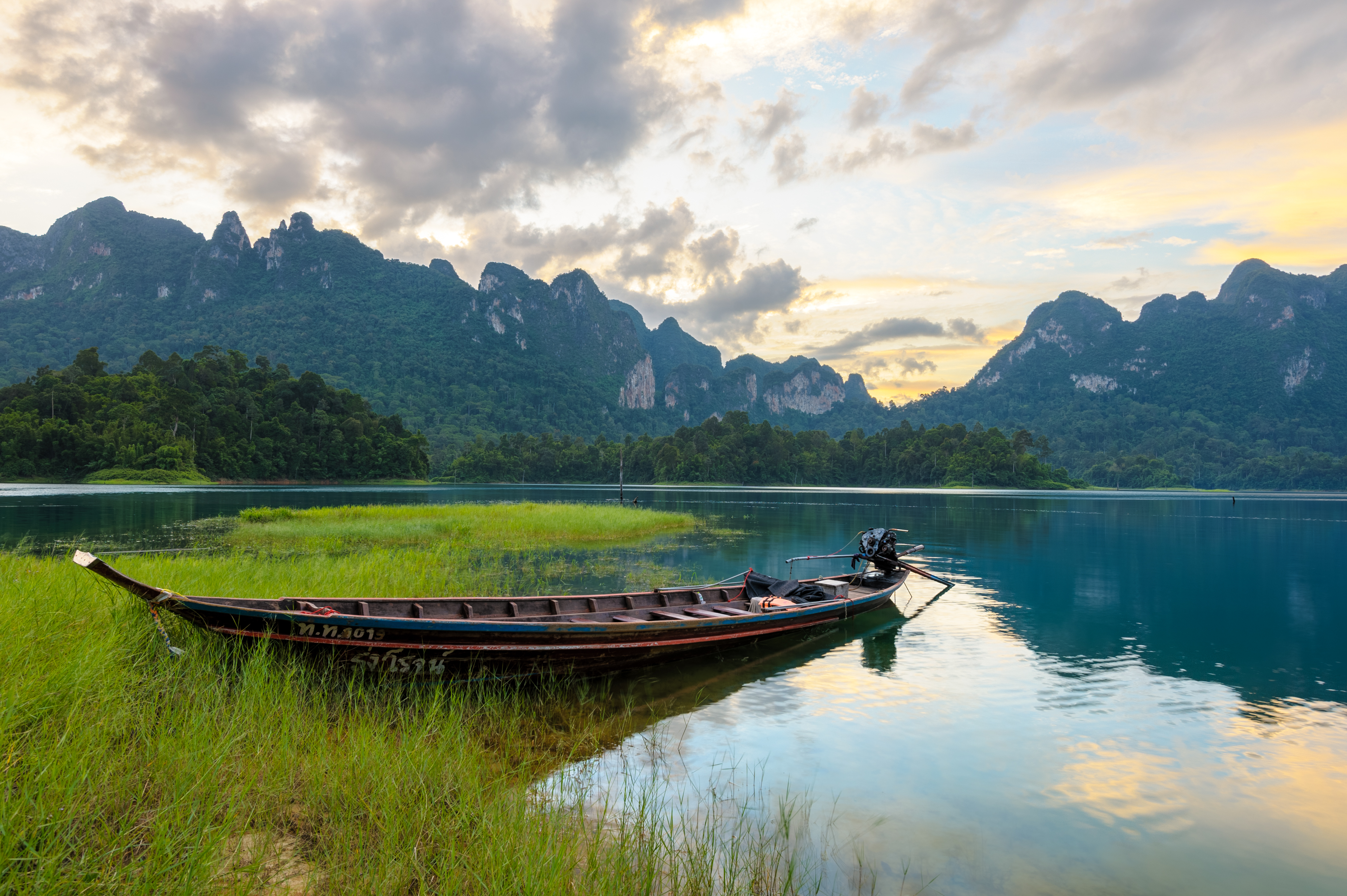
Khao Sok National Park

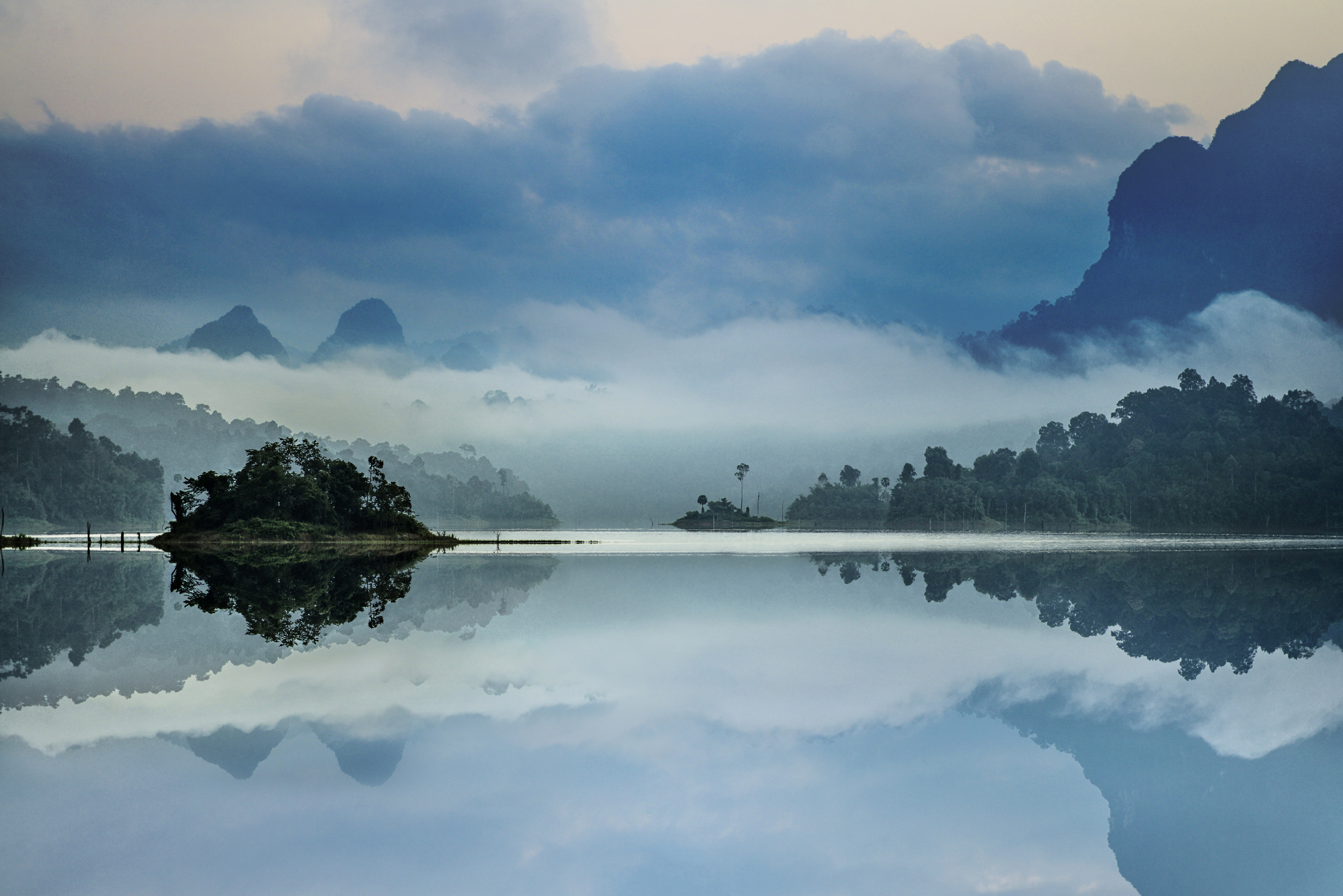
Khao Sok National Park

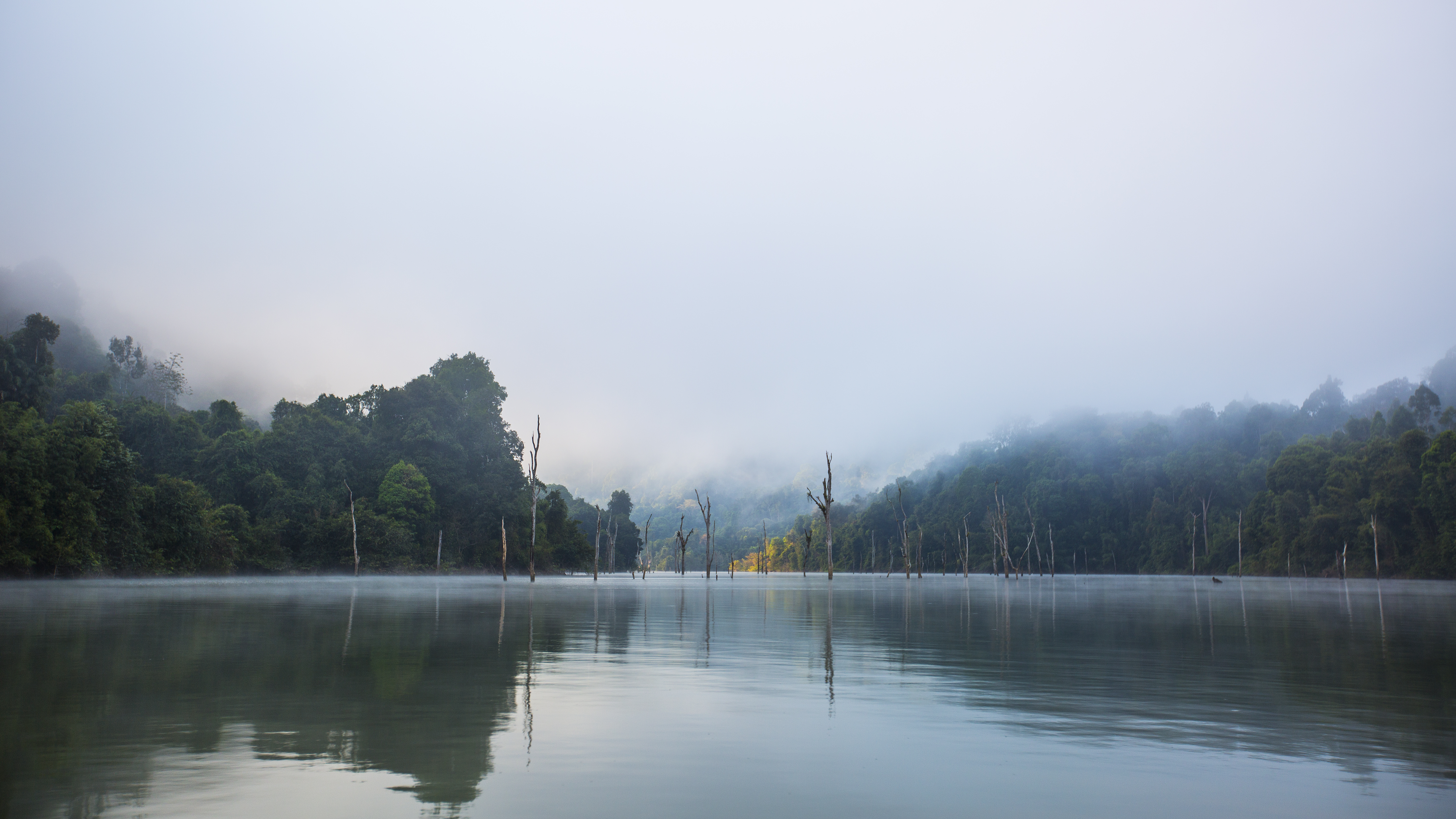
Cheow Lan Lake

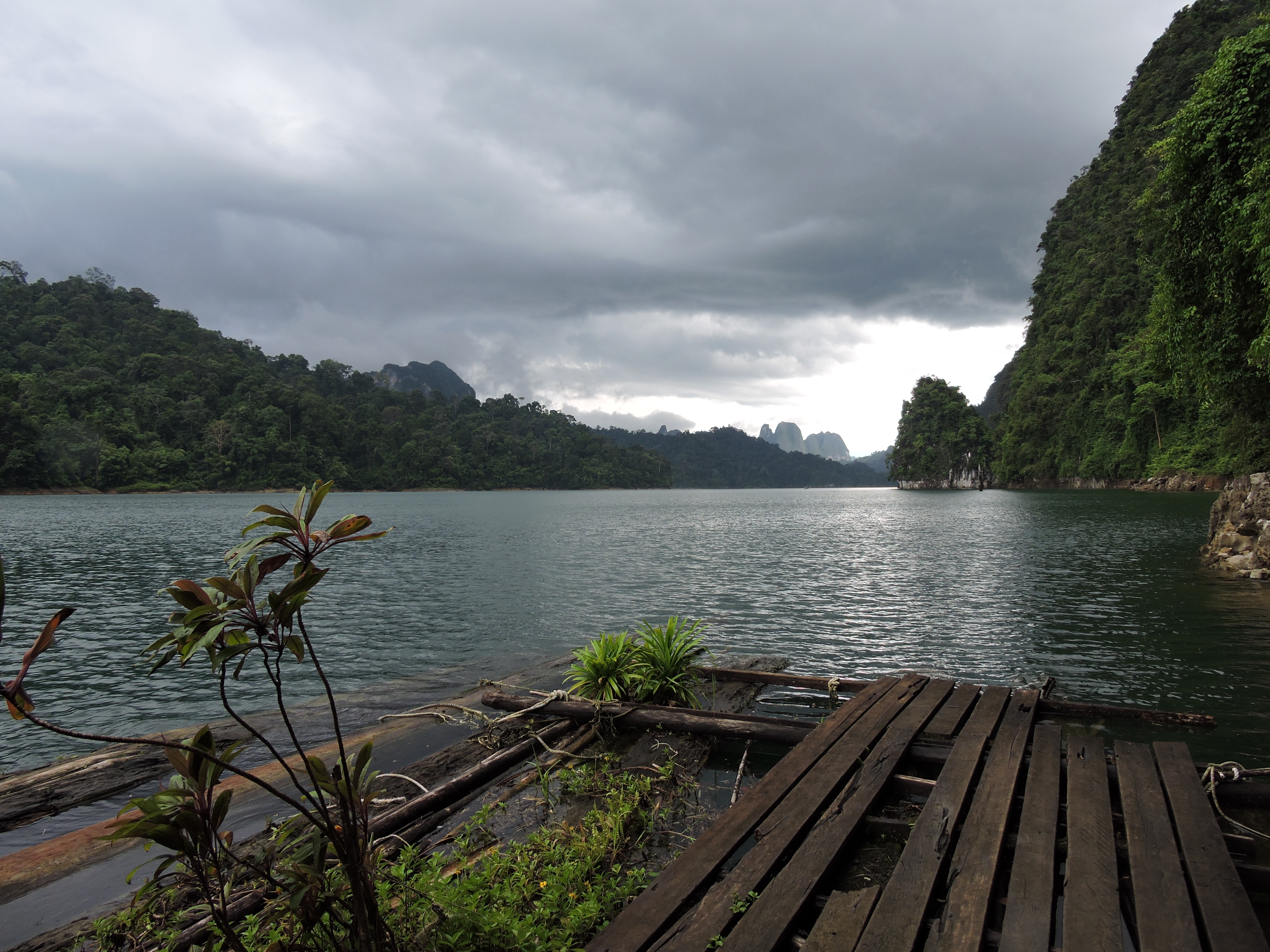
Cheow Lan Lake

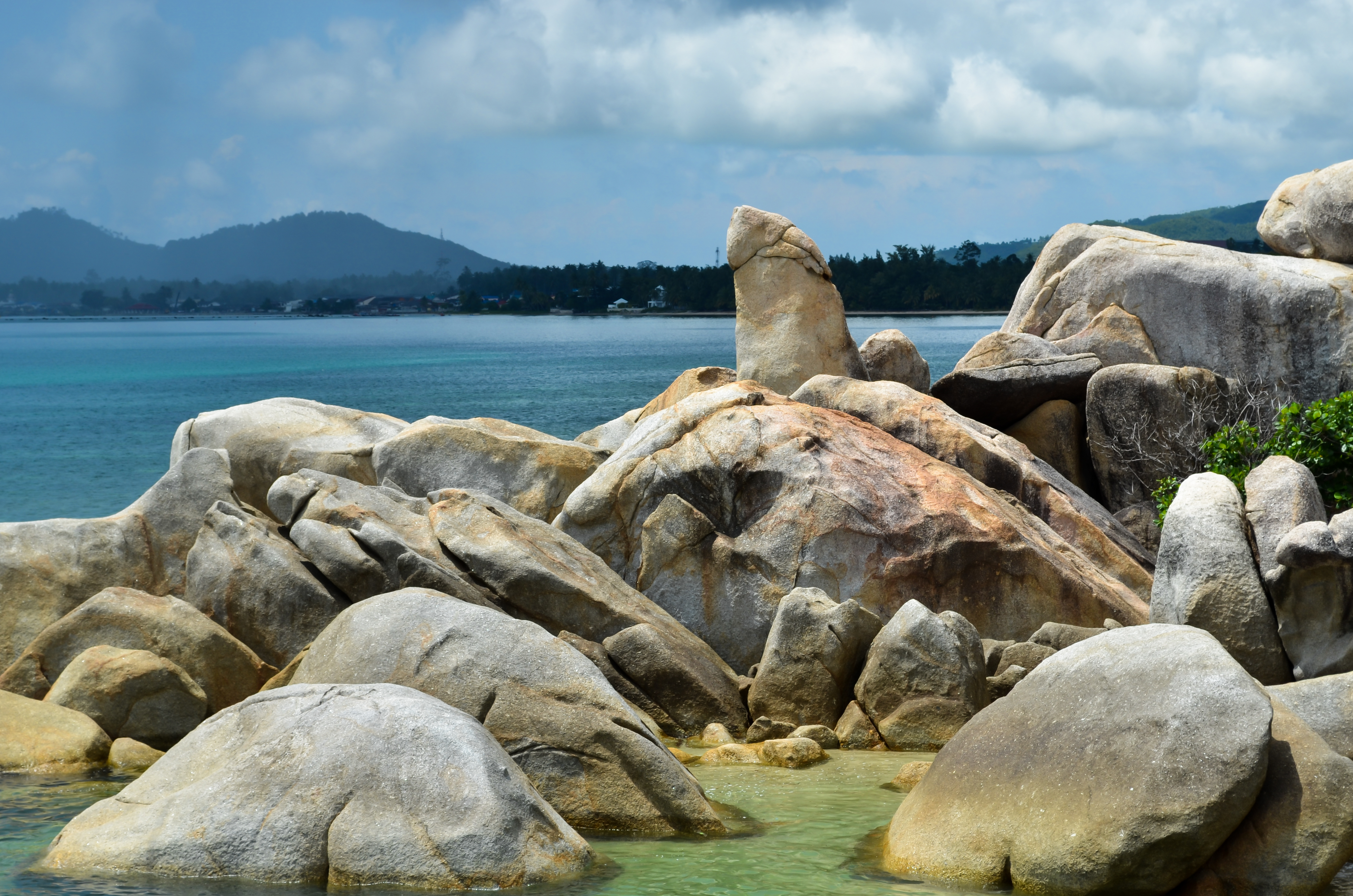
Hin Ta Hin Yai, Ko Samui

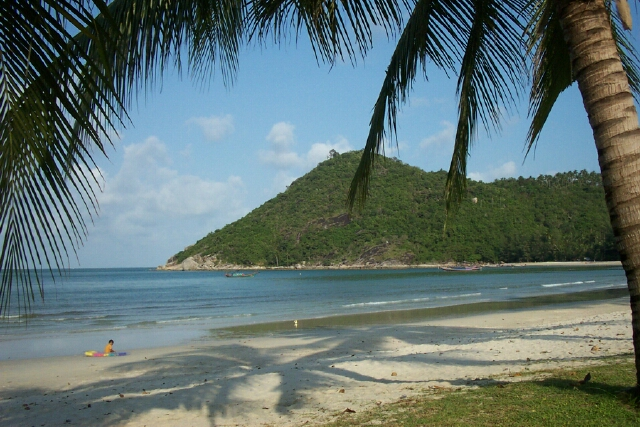
Ao Thong Nai Pan Yai, Ko Pha-Ngan

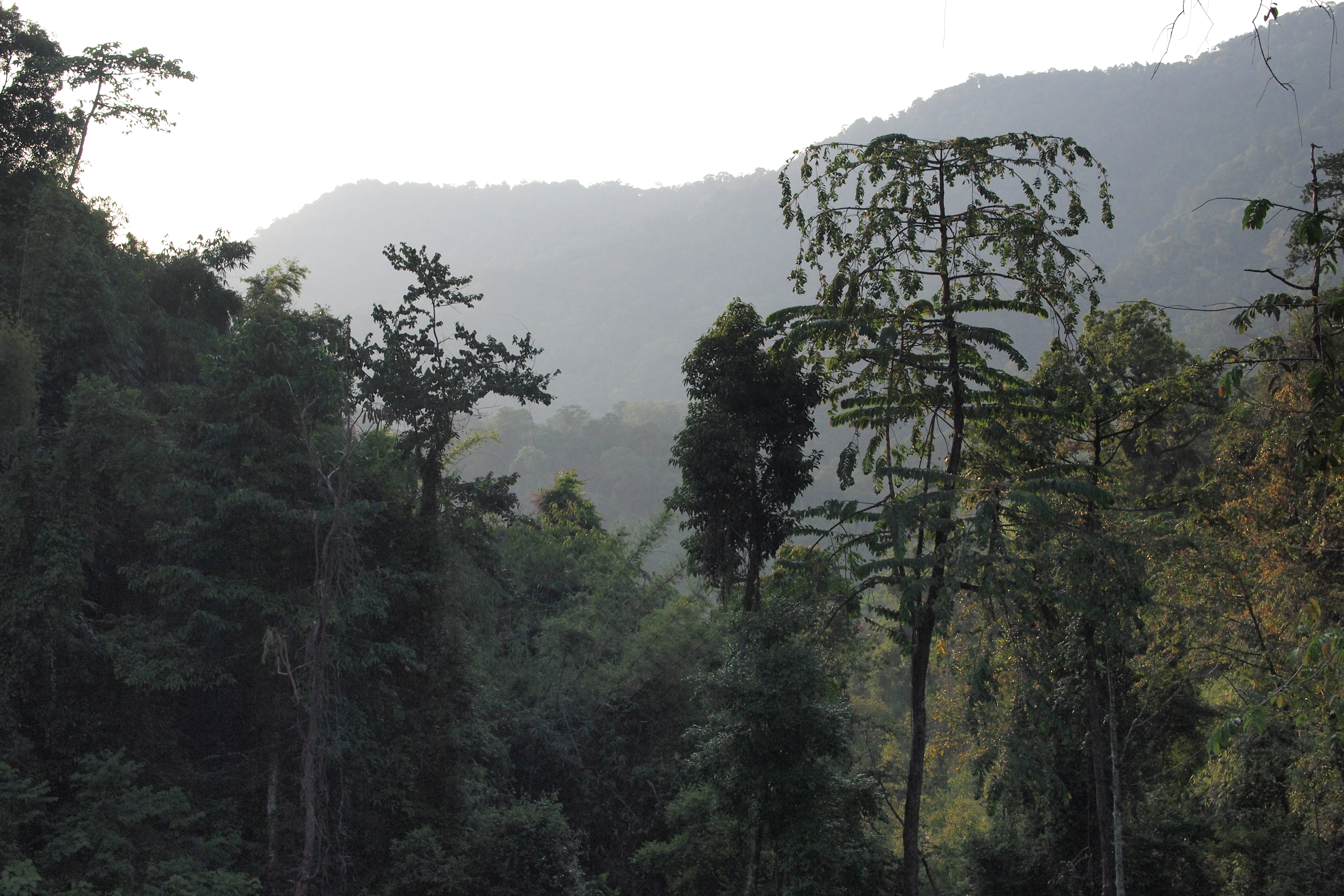
Khao Sok tropical rainforest

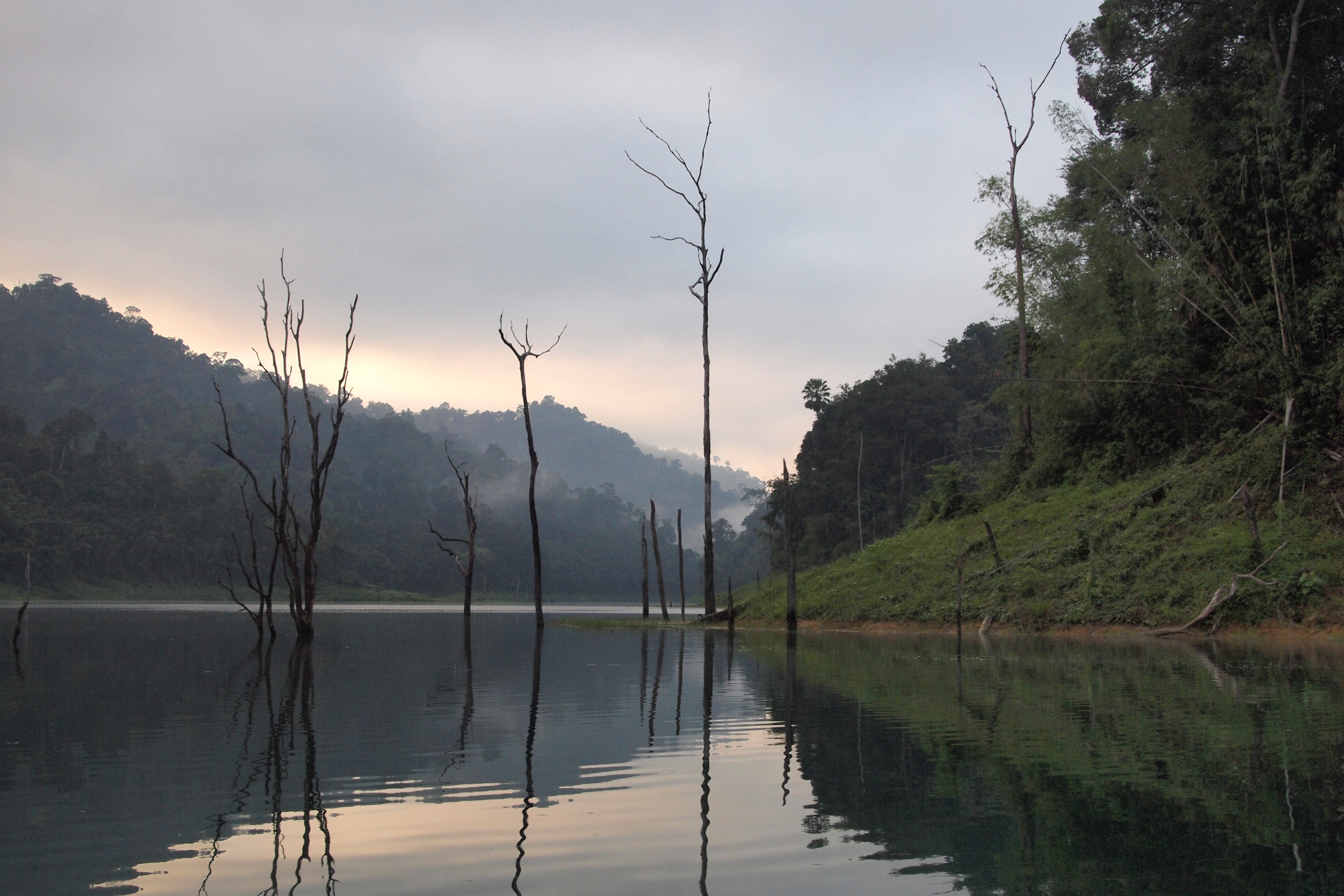
Cheow Lan Lake

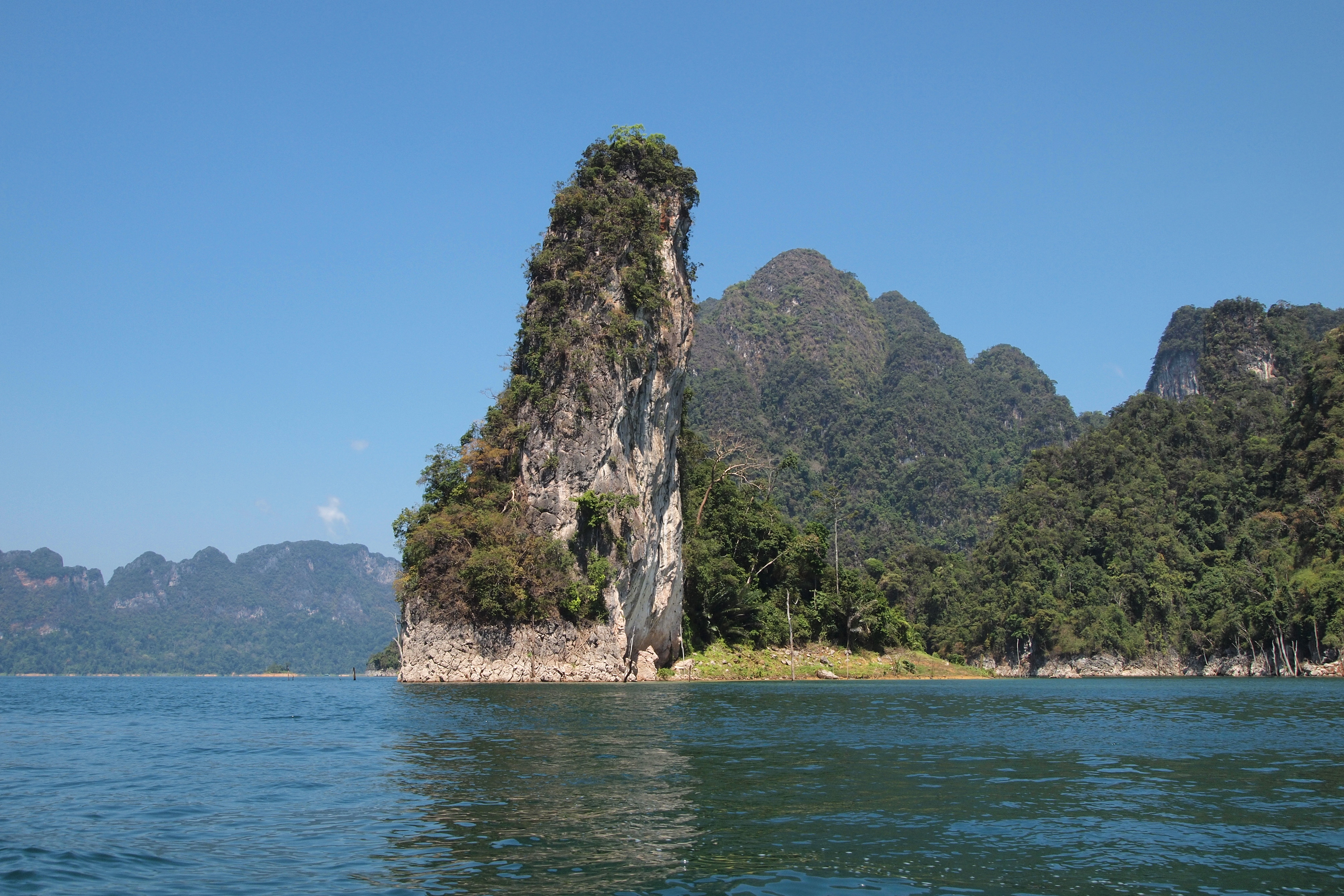
Karst formations, Cheow Lan Lake

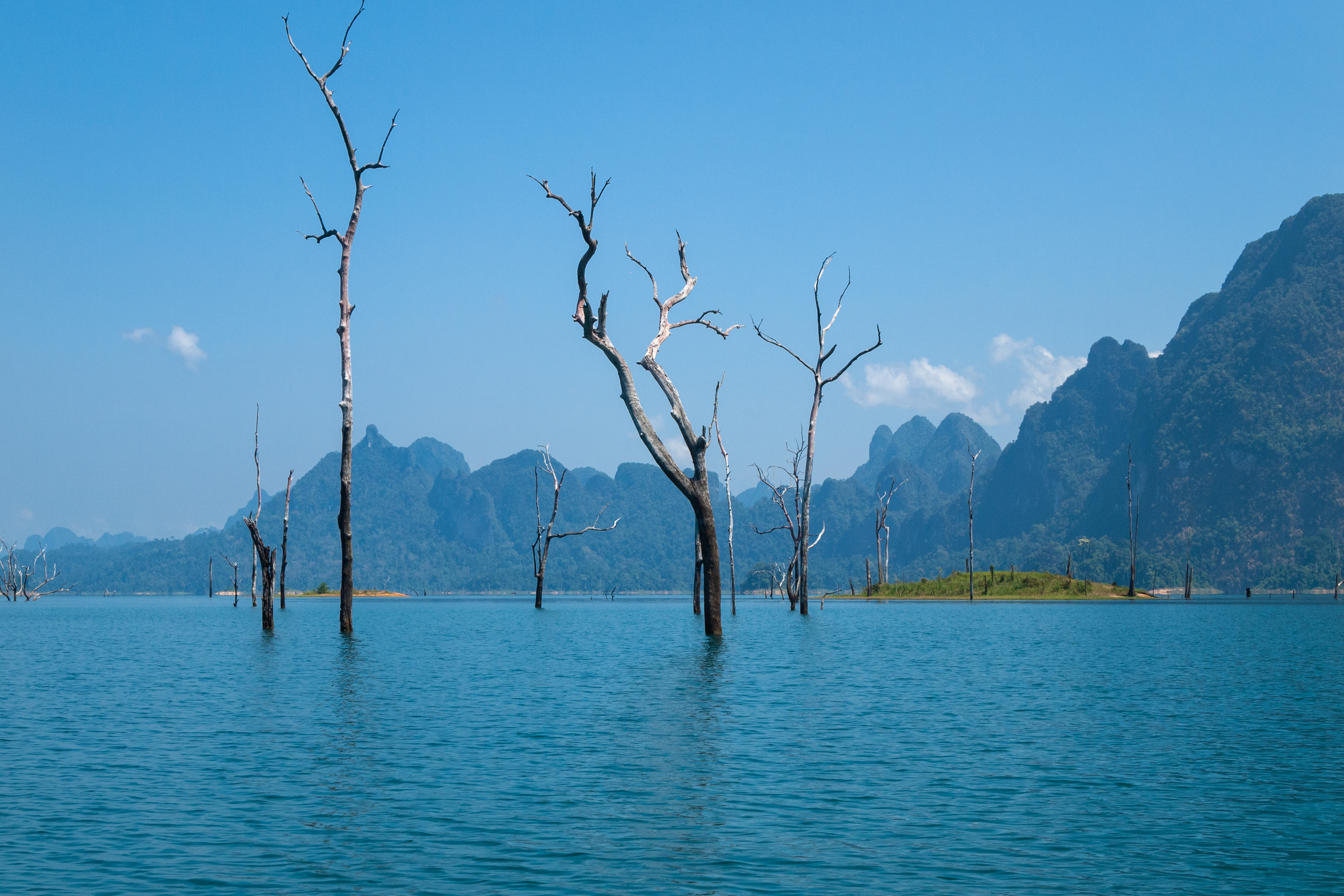
Trees rising out of Cheow Lan Lake

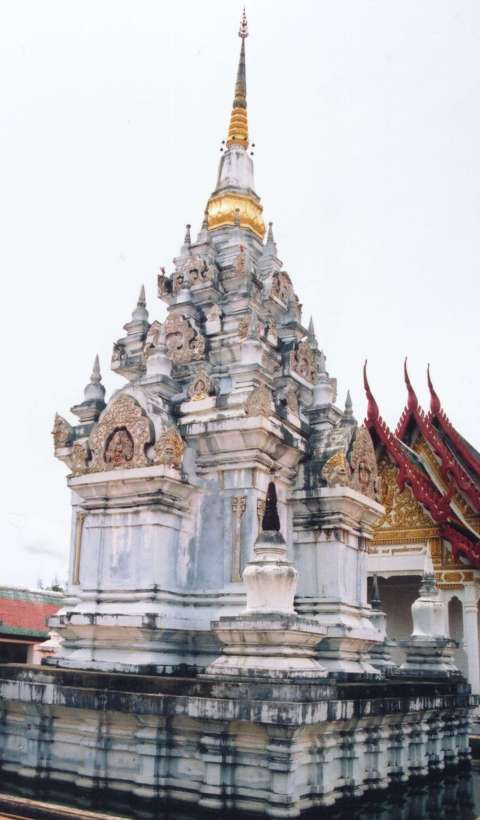
Srivijaya or Sailendra-style pagoda.

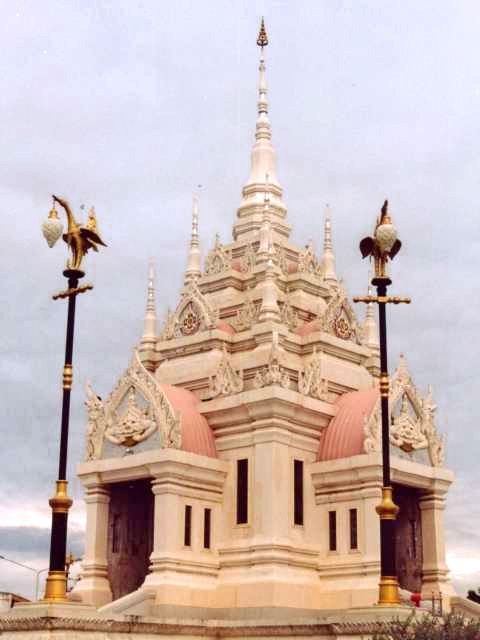
City pillar shrine, Surat Thani

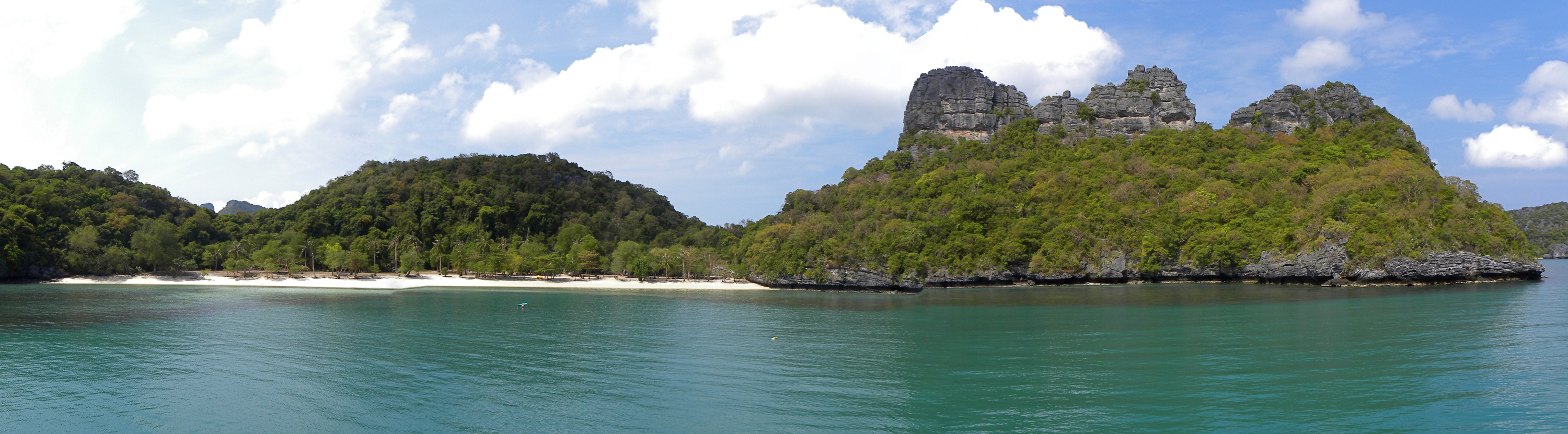
Beach at Ko Mae Ko

== See also ==
- List of railway stations in Surat Thani Province
