= Tha Chana district =

Tha Chana ท่าชนะ
- District
- District location in Surat Thani province
- Coordinates: 9°34′20″N 99°9′54″E
- Country: Thailand
- Province: Surat Thani
- Seat: Tha Chana

Area
  - Total: 687.4 km^{2} (265.4 sq mi)

Population (2015)
  - Total: 54,415
  - Density: 72.6/km^{2} (188/sq mi)
- Time zone: UTC+7 (ICT)
- Postal code: 84170
- Geocode: 8407

Tha Chana (Thai: ท่าชนะ, pronounced [tʰâː t͡ɕʰā.náʔ]) is a district (amphoe) in the north of Surat Thani province of southern Thailand.

== History ==
The district is quite old. Originally named Prasong (ประสงค์), it was a subordinate of mueang Lang Suan. In 1906 it was reassigned to mueang Chaiya, which is now Surat Thani Province. The seat of the district was in current-day Ban Tha Krachai. In 1909 as part of thesaphiban administrative reform most of the tambons were transferred to be administered directly by Phum Riang District, nowadays Chaiya district. The remainder of the district was reduced to a minor district (king amphoe), which then also became a subordinate of Phum Riang District. On 29 June 1919 it was abolished completely.

As the area developed in the following decades, the district was recreated on 1 January 1948 as a minor district. The seat of the minor district was in Ban Talad Nong Wai in tambon Tha Chana, thus the district was also named Tha Chana. On 5 June 1956 it was elevated to full district status.

== Etymology ==
The name Tha Chana means 'harbour of victory' and dates back to the expedition of vice-king Boworn Maha Surasinghanat to the south to beat back a Burmese invasion. During his victorious return in 1785 he founded the temple Wat Khotharam (now named Wat Amphawan), and also created two stele commemorating his victory. One was placed in tambon Wang, the other in tambon Tha Chana.

== Geography ==
Neighboring districts are Chaiya to the south, Phato to the northeast, and Lamae to the north. The latter two districts are in Chumphon province. To the east is the Gulf of Thailand.

== Administration ==
=== Central administration ===
Tha Chana district is divided into six sub-districts (tambons), which are further subdivided into 82 administrative villages (mubans).

| No. | Name | Thai | Villages | Pop. |
|---|---|---|---|---|
| 1. | Tha Chana | ท่าชนะ | 10 | 6,947 |
| 2. | Samo Thong | สมอทอง | 10 | 6,354 |
| 3. | Prasong | ประสงค์ | 27 | 21,002 |
| 4. | Khan Thuli | คันธุลี | 14 | 8,315 |
| 5. | Wang | วัง | 8 | 3,663 |
| 6. | Khlong Pha | คลองพา | 13 | 8,134 |

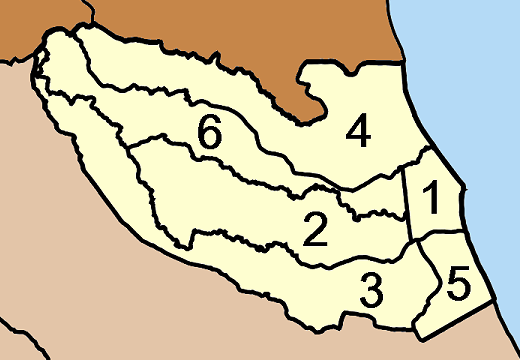

=== Local administration ===
There is one sub-district municipality (thesaban tambon) in the district:

- Tha Chana (Thai: เทศบาลตำบลท่าชนะ) consisting of parts of sub-districts Tha Chana and Samo Thong.

There are six sub-district administrative organizations (SAO) in the district:

- Tha Chana (Thai: องค์การบริหารส่วนตำบลท่าชนะ) consisting of parts of sub-district Tha Chana.
- Samo Thong (Thai: องค์การบริหารส่วนตำบลสมอทอง) consisting of parts of sub-district Samo Thong.
- Prasong (Thai: องค์การบริหารส่วนตำบลประสงค์) consisting of sub-district Prasong.
- Khan Thuli (Thai: องค์การบริหารส่วนตำบลคันธุลี) consisting of sub-district Khan Thuli.
- Wang (Thai: องค์การบริหารส่วนตำบลวัง) consisting of sub-district Wang.
- Khlong Pha (Thai: องค์การบริหารส่วนตำบลคลองพา) consisting of sub-district Khlong Pha.
