= Anwaruddin Choudhury =

Indian wildlife conservationist and ornithologist (born 1959)

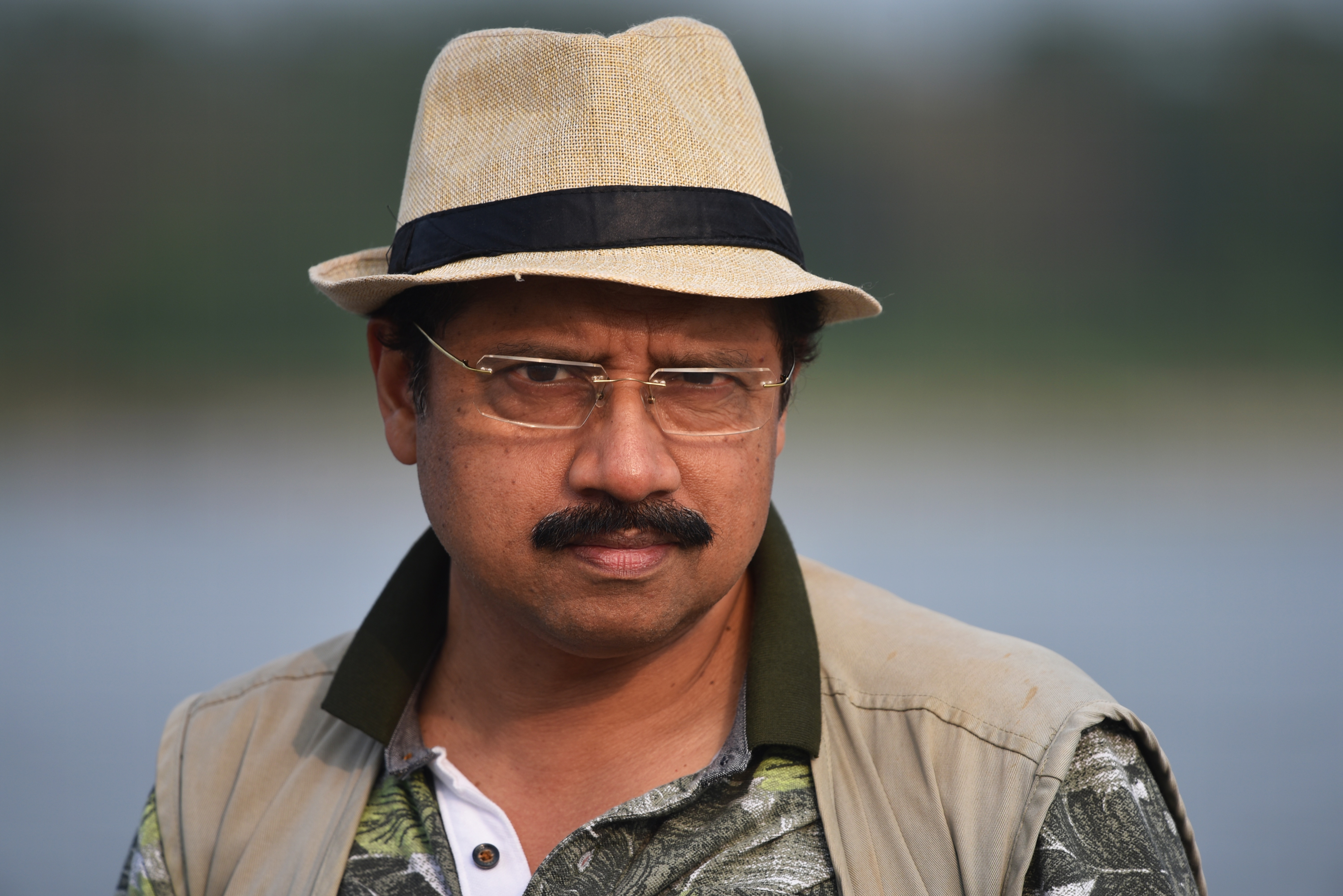
- Anwaruddin Choudhury
- Born: 1959 (age 66–67); Shillong, Meghalaya, India
- Education: B. Borooah College; Gauhati University
- Occupations: Naturalist, ornithologist, mammalogist, civil servant, author
- Known for: Expertise on the fauna of North-East India

Anwaruddin Choudhury (born 1959 in Shillong, Meghalaya) is an Indian ornithologist, mammalogist, and wildlife conservation specialist mainly focused on North-East India. His work includes decades of research, field studies, and policy advocacy. He has served in various governmental roles, including being the Deputy Commissioner in Assam and as Secretary in the state government, and ultimately retiring as the Divisional Commissioner of Barak Valley in August 2019.

Choudhury is also the Honorary Chief Executive and a trustee of the Rhino Foundation for Nature in North-East India. Born into an academically oriented family, Choudhury was raised in Shillong and finished his matriculation in 1974. He earned a Bachelor of Arts with Honors in geography, followed by a master's degree from Gauhati University, where he also received a gold medal for his academic performance. He completed his PhD in primate studies in 1989 and DSc in 2008 on a review of mammals of North-east India, both from Gauhati University.

Choudhury's public service career began in 1983 as an Assam Civil Service officer, transitioning to the Indian Administrative Service in 1999. Throughout his tenure, he undertook various administrative roles, leading projects aimed at rural development, environmental protection, and wildlife conservation.

== Early and service life ==
Anwaruddin Choudhury, born in Shillong, Meghalaya, in 1959, is the eldest among four siblings born to Alauddin Choudhury and Hena Mazumder. His early education took place at various institutions, including Public High School, Hailakandi, Government Boys High School in Mawkhar, Shillong, and Government Victoria Memorial High School, Hailakandi, where he completed his matriculation in 1974 with second-division honors.

Choudhury initially pursued science in college, but later obtained his Bachelor of Arts degree with Honours in Geography from B.Borooah College, Guwahati, securing a first-class position in 1981. He continued his academic journey at Gauhati University, earning a Master of Arts degree in geography in 1985, also achieving first position with a gold medal. In 1989, under the guidance of Mohammed Taher, he earned his PhD focusing on the primates of Assam. Notably, he became only the second person to receive a DSc from Gauhati University, awarded for his systematic review of mammals in North-East India in 2008. In 1994, Choudhury married Bilkis Begum Mazumdar, with whom he has a daughter Dona and a son named Dino. His maternal grandfather, Abdul Matlib Mazumder, was a prominent freedom fighter and served as a Cabinet Minister in Assam from 1946 to 1970.

Choudhury's dedication to ornithology began in the early 1980s, leading to the publication of over 175 scientific articles and 135 popular articles on birds. He has contributed significantly to the study of birds in North-East India, rediscovering species such as the Manipur bush quail after a 75-year absence from records. His research efforts have also included comprehensive surveys and conservation initiatives for migratory birds, particularly the Amur falcon. In mammalogy, he has published 88 scientific articles and 82 popular articles since 1981. His research has led to the identification of several new species of flying squirrels and a subspecies of hoolock gibbon. Choudhury's work on the wild water buffalo stands out as a notable contribution to the field.

=== Success in art ===
He had his first exhibition in Guwahati in 1975, which was held jointly with noted artists Manabendra Baruah and Ajan Barua. Choudhury has published his artwork in various Indian and international journals, magazines, and periodicals, including the cover of the Oriental Bird Club Bulletin published from U.K.

=== Ornithology ===
Casual bird watching took a serious scientific approach in the early 1980s. Choudhury pioneered long-term ornithological works in North-East India that are now nearly five decades old. He started writing for popular magazines and started a regular weekly column as ‘Birds of Assam’ in an English daily The Sentinel published from Guwahati. The publications in local newspapers in the 1980s brought him recognition in the field of ornithology across Assam, but his writings in international scientific journals and his books made that recognition global in nature. He has written 175 scientific articles and 135 popular articles on birds. Choudhury undertook systematic bird surveys in different pockets of North-East India. He rediscovered a rare galliform species, the Manipur bush quail, in Assam, after its last record 75 years ago. He has made several new country records for India and Bhutan. He coordinated the Asian Mid-Winter Waterfowl Census for Assam and is also the coordinator for North East India. He is also the State Coordinator of the Indian Bird Conservation Network.

He has done pioneering path-breaking studies on the endangered White-winged wood duck and Mrs Hume's pheasant to reveal their accurate range and status in India. He also campaigned for the conservation of migratory Amur falcons in Assam from 1994 onwards, in Manipur starting in 2001, and in Nagaland in 2004. He carried out detailed monitoring of the roosting population of this falcon in 2017–19 in Karbi Anglong that revealed a lot of new information on the species including the annual fluctuation of population.

=== Mammal research ===
Choudhury pioneered long-term primate research in North-East India in the mid-1980s, nearly four decades ago. To date, he published 88 scientific and 82 popular articles on primates starting from 1981. In 1986, he traveled to North Cachar Hills (renamed Dima Hasao district) to start a two-decade-long research on primates that covered the entire North-East India in later years. Little was known about the life of these simians in the wild until he started his writings on them. He has made several country records for India and Bhutan. But the most significant is the discovery and description of three flying squirrels, relatively new to science, in 2007, 2009, and 2013. The three new flying squirrel species that were described by Choudhury in 2007–2013 are:

- Mechuka giant flying squirrel, Petaurista mechukaensis Choudhury, 2007 (type locality: Mechuka)
- Mishmi giant flying squirrel, Petaurista mishmiensis Choudhury, 2009 (type locality: Mishmi Hills)
- Mebo giant flying squirrel, Petaurista siangensis Choudhury, 2013 (type locality: Upper Siang District)

The holotypes of these flying squirrel species are in the collection of the Zoological Survey of India, Kolkata.

He also discovered a new species of primate but identified it as a subspecies of Macaca thibetana. This was later on described by other scientists as Macaca munzala. Recently he described a new subspecies of hoolock gibbon, which he named the Hoolock hoolock mishmiensis. He also revealed for the first time that the stump-tailed and pig-tailed macaques are restricted by the Brahmaputra towards the west of their range. His authoritative works on the wild water buffalo have been published recently as the first monograph on this endangered species. His 432-page The Mammals of North East India, published in 2013, is the most comprehensive and authoritative coverage of any part of India. Choudhury's observations on capped langur revealed hitherto unrecorded differences in facial hair patterns (especially the cap) that differentiate the three subspecies, which were earlier based on color variations. Hair patterns are more dependable than color patterns.

== The Rhino Foundation ==
He is the founder and Chief Executive of the Rhino Foundation for Nature in North East India, a leading NGO in India since 1995. This NGO was founded by some leading tea companies and its founder chairperson was Anne Wright. Anil Kumar Goswami, a leading scientist of Assam is its current chairperson. Choudhury's pioneering work in conservation also contributed greatly to increasing awareness of the issue of endangerment of Rhinos in North East India. His stewardship of the Rhino Foundation for Nature in North East India as well as his other activities was recognised and he was appointed a member of the State Board for Wildlife, the highest policy-making official body on wildlife, in 2003 by the Government of Assam. The Government of Assam has also made him a member of two other official bodies—the State Wetland Steering Committee in 2003 (for several years) and the State Pollution Control Board in 2008 (till 2022)(for a few years). Before that, the Government of India made the Rhino Foundation for Nature in North East India a member of the Indian Board for Wildlife in 1999, which was headed by the then Prime Minister of India Atal Behari Bajpayee.

Choudhury was one of the early members of the World Wide Fund for Nature (formerly called the World Wildlife Fund), and the Bombay Natural History Society in North-East India (since 1981) and has actively contributed towards their activities in this region, including wildlife surveys, awareness and identification of Important Bird Areas.

== Conservation career ==
Choudhury is a member of eight IUCN/SSC/BLI Specialist Groups, which in itself is a major conservation achievement. He is a member of IUCN/SSC Asian Elephant, Asian Rhino, Asian Wild Cattle, Bear, Cat Specialist Groups, and IUCN/SSC/BLI Waterbird and Galliformes Specialist Groups. In addition, he is a member of IUCN/SSC Primate Specialist Group's South Asian Network and was also with IUCN/SSC Conservation Breeding and Small Carnivore Specialist Groups. Choudhury is also a member of the International Asiatic Black Bear, Sun Bear, and Sloth Bear Expert Groups. Among official bodies, he is a member of several Government of Assam bodies, these include the State Board for Wildlife (since 2004), Assam State Pollution Control Board (2008–2022), RhinoVision 2020 (2005–2020), Task Force for translocation of Rhinos within Assam (since 2010) and Committee on the creation of Tiger Reserve/National Park, Wildlife Division, etc., in Karbi Anglong Districts (2023-) and Permanent Invitee, "Technical Committee" on scientific research in Protected Areas of Assam (since 2023). In the 1980s and 1990s, he went to the remote Himalayan region in Arunachal Pradesh and Bhutan, and to the mountainous regions of Nagaland, Manipur, and Mizoram, which are occupied by people of the Tibetan-Burman and Tibeto-Chinese ethnicity who heavily supplement their income by hunting wildlife (except Bhutan). Choudhury was there to study the vanishing wildlife as well as motivate the people for conservation with various amounts of success.

== Conservation results ==
Choudhury's work in conservation has resulted in the identification and subsequent protection of a large number of areas in North-East India, more particularly Assam. Due to his work, more than 15 wildlife sanctuaries have been established, including Bordoibam-Bilmukh, Pani-Dihing, Barail, Bherjan-Borajan-Podumoni, Dihing-Patkai, Hollongapar Gibbon, Nambor-Doigrung, Nambor, East Karbi Anglon, North Karbi Anglong, Amchang, Marat Longri, Barak-Bhuban and Narpuh; and two elephant reserves, the Dhansiri-Lungding and Dihing-Patkai. He was also instrumental in upgrading Dibru-Saikhowa into a national park, inclusion of Laokhowa and Burhachapori Sanctuaries in Kaziranga Tiger Reserve, and declaration of the white-winged wood duck as the state bird of Assam. He is among very few fortunate scientists who could implement their own scientific/conservation recommendations later on as a bureaucrat. Many of the above have been officially notified and gazetted by himself as the Deputy Secretary and later as Joint Secretary to the Government in Environment & Forest Department. He was also a key member of the Assam Forest Policy Drafting Committee.

His writings in the 1980s also resulted in the shelving of a railway project through the southern edge of the world-famous Kaziranga National Park and World Heritage Site.

== Other contributions ==
As a bureaucrat, Anwaruddin Choudhury was influential in ensuring a rural district of Assam to start e-governance giving transparency to the rural poor. He also took an active part and partially succeeded in reducing social murders in the name of witch-hunting in remote areas such as Baksa district at the edge of Eastern Himalaya in Assam. Choudhury's influence helped save many protected areas in North-East India from environmentally destructive developmental projects. The diversion of a National Highway from Manas National Park and Tiger Reserve near Koklabari, construction of two wildlife-movement underpasses on the diverted portion of the highway to Nganglam (in Bhutan) near Manas in 2007–10, and a power line from Dulung Reserved Forest in Lakhimpur district in 2012-13 are recent examples. He always spoken against such projects including mega dams.

== Publications and writing ==
Anwaruddin Choudhury has written 31 books and monographs, and more than 55 technical reports on the birds and mammals of North East India based on his studies and supported by long-term observations (list below). He has also written 1000 articles and scientific papers about wildlife and conservation. He has published significant number of articles and papers in prestigious journals such as 101 articles starting from 1988 in Journal of Bombay Natural History Society, 14 articles starting from 1987 in Oryx (UK), 21 articles starting from 1983 in Tigerpaper (Thailand), 19 articles starting from 1991 in Newsletter for Birdwatchers, 21 articles starting from 2006 in Indian Birds, 15 and 18 articles respectively starting from 1991 each in Forktail journal (UK) and BirdingAsia, 74 articles starting from 1996 in Journal & Newsletter of the Rhino Foundation, 22 articles starting from 2000 in Mistnet, 21 articles starting from 1982 in Sanctuary Asia, 18 articles starting from 1996 in Environ. In addition, he also published in Folia Parimatologica (Switzerland), American Journal of Primatology, Primate Conservation (both in the USA), Journal of Tropical Ecology (UK), Primate Report (Germany), Danphe (Nepal), Pachyderm (Kenya) among others. For nearly four decades, Choudhury's field research has helped shape wildlife protection efforts in India more particularly in North-East India.

Many of Choudhury's books continue to be referenced for the study of birds and mammals in North-East India. He is the author of:

=== Books and monographs authored ===
- Checklist of the Birds of Assam, Guwahati: Sofia Pub. (1990)
- A Naturalist in Karbi Anglong, Guwahati: Gibbon Books (1993, 2009)
- Checklist of the Mammals of Assam, Guwahati: Gibbon Books (1994)
- Survey of White-winged Wood Duck and Bengal Florican, Guwahati: Rhino Foundation (1996)
- Checklist of the Mammals of Assam, rev.2nd edn., Guwahati: Gibbon Books (1997)
- The Birds of Assam, Guwahati: Gibbon Books & WWF (2000)
- A Pocket Guide to the Birds of Nagaland, Guwahati: Gibbon Books & Rhino Foundation (2003)
- Birds of Kaziranga National Park: a checklist, Guwahati: Gibbon Books & Rhino Foundation (2003)
- The Mammals of Arunachal Pradesh, New Delhi: Regency Pub. (2004)
- Kaziranga: wildlife in Assam, Delhi: Rupa & Co.(2004)
- A Pocket Guide to the Birds of Arunachal Pradesh, Guwahati: Gibbon Books & Rhino Foundation (supported by OBC, UK; 2006)
- Birds of Manas National Park, Guwahati: Gibbon Books & Rhino Foundation (2006)
- Birds of Dibru-Saikhowa National Park, Guwahati: Gibbon Books & Rhino Foundation (2007)
- A Pocket Guide to the Birds of Mizoram, Guwahati: Gibbon Books & Rhino Foundation (supported by OBC, UK; 2008)
- A Naturalist in Karbi Anglong, rev. 2nd ed., Guwahati: Gibbon Books (2009)
- The Vanishing herds: the wild water buffalo, Guwahati: Gibbon Books & Rhino Foundation (supported by COA, Taiwan, and CEPF/ATREE).
- The secrets of wild Assam, Guwahati: Bhabani Books (2012)
- The threatened birds of Assam, Mumbai: BNHS & Oxford Univ. Press (supported by CEPF/ATREE and BirdLife Int., Cambridge)[jointly with A.R. Rahmani].
- The mammals of North East India, Guwahati: Gibbon Books & Rhino Foundation (supported by COA, Taiwan; 2013)
- A Pocket Guide to the Birds of Meghalaya. Guwahati: Gibbon Books & Rhino Foundation (supported by OBC, UK; 2014).
- The mammals of India, Guwahati: Gibbon Books & Rhino Foundation (supported by COA, Taiwan; 2016)
- Manas India's threatened World Heritage, Guwahati: Gibbon books & Rhino Foundation (2019)
- A Pocket Guide to the Birds of Assam, Guwahati: Gibbon books & Rhino Foundation (2025)
- Birds of Deepor Beel, Kolkata: Nature, Environment & Wildlife Society (2026)
- Wild habitats in North East India, Guwahati: Gibbon books & Rhino Foundation (2026)

=== Technical studies and reports ===
- Primates of Assam: their Distribution, Habitat and Status. Ph.D. thesis. Gauhati Univ. (1989).
- A Report on Bird Survey in Dibru-Saikhowa Wildlife Sanctuary, Assam, India. Report to the Oriental Bird Club, UK. (1994).
- Proposed Oil Field Nature Reserve, Digboi. The Rhino Foundation for Nature in NE India & WWF-India NE Region, Guwahati. (1996).
- Survey of Primates in some parts of eastern and central Assam. Final Report to ASTEC (Assam Science Tech. & Environment Council), Guwahati. (1996).
- A collaborative study on Gaurs (Bos Taurus) in North Bengal, West Bengal, India. With S. Bhattacharyya & G. Biswas).WWF-India Eastern Region, Calcutta. (1997).
- Survey of grasslands in some parts of central and southern Assam: to assess their bio-diversity & socio-economic problems. WWF-India NE Regional Office, Guwahati. Final Report to WWF-India, New Delhi (a BCPP). (1997).
- Conservation Strategy for the Indian rhinoceros and Asian elephant in NE India. Asian Rhino & Elephant Conservation Strategy (AREAS). Final Report & Project Proposals to WWF-India, New Delhi. (1999).
- The birds of Eaglenest and Sessa Orchid Sanctuaries, Arunachal Pradesh. Final Report to Oriental Bird Club, UK. (2000)
- Survey of birds in Sangti-Shergaon-Kalaktang areas of West Kameng district, Arunachal Pradesh. BildLife International, The Royal Society for the Protection of Birds, Wild Bird Federation Taiwan and Bombay Natural History Society (2001).
- A systematic review of the mammals of North-East India with special reference to the non-human primates. D.Sc.Thesis. Gauhati Univ. (2001).
- Major inland wetlands of North-Eastern India. A report submitted to SACON, Coimbatore. (2002).
- Survey of Mrs Hume's Pheasant in NE India. Report No. 5. The Rhino Foundation for Nature in NE India, Guwahati [final report to OBC, UK]. (2002).
- Biodiversity survey in the upper areas of East Kameng district, Arunachal Pradesh. WWF-India Assam & Arunachal Office, Guwahati. (2002).
- The red panda - status and conservation. In 'Biodiversity 'Hotspots' Conservation Programme (BHCP). Final report 1992–2002. 132–168. WWF- India, New Delhi. (2003).
- Survey of birds in Mechuka-Monigong-Jorgging areas of West and Upper Siang districts, Arunachal Pradesh. Birdlife International, The Royal Society for the Protection of Birds, Wild Bird Federation Taiwan, and Bombay Natural History Society. (2003).
- Awareness of bird conservation in Nagaland in northeastern India. Final Report to the Oriental Bird Club, UK. (2004).
- A survey of animal use extraction patterns in some areas of the Indian Himalayas.: Nagaland and Arunachal Pradesh. With KT Thomas Rengma. WPA- India, Guwahati (2005).
- Survey and monitoring of nesting sites of Gyps vultures in Assam, India. With K. Lahkar and R. Risebrough. The Rhino Foundation for Nature in NE India and Department of Environment & Forests, Government of Assam, Guwahati, India. (2005).
- Census of Wild Water Buffalo in Laokhowa and Burhachapori Wildlife sanctuaries. With B.S. Bonal and C. Muthukumarvel. The Environment & Forest Department and The Rhino Foundation for Nature in NE India, Guwahati. (2008).
- Census of Wild Water Buffalo in Manas National Park. With A. Swargiary, C.R. Bhobora, and B. Saikia. The Field Directorate, Manas National Park, Barpeta Road, and The Rhino Foundation for Nature in NE India, Guwahati. (2008).
- Census of Wildwater Buffalo in Dibru-Saikhowa National Park. With A. Dey. The Environment & Forest Department and The Rhino Foundation for Nature in NE India, Guwahati. (2008).
- Survey of mammals and birds in Dibang-Dihang Biosphere Reserve, Arunachal Pradesh. Final Report to Ministry of Env. & Forests, Govt. of India. The Rhino Foundation for Nature in NE India. Guwahati, India. 70pp.(2008).
- Records of Sloth Bear and Malayan Sun Bear in North East India. Final report to International Association for Bear Research & Management (IBA). The Rhino Foundation for Nature in NE India, Guwahati, Assam, India. Pp. 53.(2011).
- Records of Asiatic Black Bear in North East India. Final report to International Association for Bear Research & Management (IBA). The Rhino Foundation for Nature in NE India, Guwahati, Assam, India. Pp. 00.(2013).
- Camera trapping for wildlife with special reference to Small Mammals in parts of Arunachal Pradesh, Assam, Meghalaya, and Mizoram in North East India. Technical Report No. 17, The Rhino Foundation for Nature in NE India, Guwahati, Assam, India. Pp. 62. (2014).
- Conservation of migratory Amur falcons (Falco amurensis) in Assam. Final Report. The Rhino Foundation for Nature in NE India & ONGC, Guwahati, Assam. 40pp. (2020).
- Habitat management in rhino-bearing areas of Assam. A preliminary report. A report submitted to Environment & Forest dept., Govt. of Assam, Guwahati. (2021).
- Planning a Protected Area Network in Assam. A report submitted to the Chief Minister of Assam, Guwahati. (2021).
- Conservation of migratory Amur falcons (Falco amurensis) in Assam. With F. Tayebulla. Final Report, The Rhino Foundation for Nature in NE India, Guwahati, Assam. 28pp. (2022).
- Conservation of migratory Amur Falcons in Umrongso, Dima Hasao, Assam. Final Report. The Rhino Foundation for nature in NE India with support from North Cachar Hills Autonomous Council. 43pp. (2025).
- Conservation of migratory Amur Falcons in Umrukhuti or Umru II, West Karbi Anglong, Assam. Final Report. The Rhino Foundation for nature in NE India with support from Karbi Anglong Autonomous Council. 40pp. (2025).

== Awards ==
Choudhury's honors include:

- Gold medal for M.A. by Gauhati University, 1985
- Medal of the North-East India Geographical Society for securing 1st position in Geography in B.A. (honours), 1980
- Forktail-Leica Award for Mrs Hume's pheasant study by the Oriental Bird Club
- OBC-WildWings Conservation Award, UK for conservation activities in Nagaland
- Community Leadership Award (environment) of ERD (Education, Research & Development) Foundation, Guwahati, 2013
- Eastern Himalaya Conservation Award of Balipara Foundation, 2013
- True Legend Award of the Telegraph Group, 2015
- Lifetime Achievement Award at the 10th edition of NatWest Group (formerly Royal Bank of Scotland) Earth Heroes Awards, 2020
- Lifetime Service Award of Sanctuary Nature Foundation, 2021
- Lifetime Achievement Award of Kaziranga Wildlife Society, 2022
- Kushal Mookherjee Lifetime Achievement Award of Nature Mates, Kolkata, 2023
- Lifetime Service Award of Balipara Foundation, 2023
- Lifetime Achievement Award of Aaranyak, 2024
- Certificate of Excellence of Progressive People's Foundation, 2024
- Census Medal 1991 and 2011 by the Government of India
