= List of protected areas of Assam =

Assam protected areas includes Seven national parks (2.51% of Assam's area), 17 wildlife sanctuaries (98.88% of Assam's area), and three proposed wildlife sanctuaries.

== National parks of Assam ==
Sl. No.	Name	Location	Area (km^{2})	Date/Year of announced as National Park
1	Kaziranga National Park	Golaghat, Nagaon, Sonitpur and Karbi Anglong	430	1974
2	Manas National Park	Kokrajhar, Chirang, Baksa,	391	1990
3	Nameri National Park	Sonitpur	200.00	1999
4	Dibru-Saikhowa National Park	Dibrugarh and Tinsukia	340.00	1999
5	Orang National Park	Udalguri and Sonitpur	78.8	13 April 1999
6	Raimona National Park	Kokrajhar	422.00	8 June 2021
7	Dehing Patkai National Park	Dibrugarh and Tinsukia	234.26	9 June 2021
8	Sikna Jwhwlao National Park	Kokrajhar and Chirang	321.90	15 August 2024

== Wildlife sanctuaries ==
Sl. No.	Name	Location	Area (km^{2})w7suuu	Year of Notification
1	Hoollongapar Gibbon Sanctuary	Jorhat	20.98	1997
2	Garampani Wildlife Sanctuary	Karbi Anglong	6.05	
3	Bura Chapori Wildlife Sanctuary	Sonitpur	44.06	
4	Bornadi Wildlife Sanctuary	Udalguri and Baksa	26.22	1980
5	Sonai Rupai Wildlife Sanctuary	Sonitpur	220	1998
6	Pobitora Wildlife Sanctuary	Marigaon	38.80	1987
7	Panidihing Bird Sanctuary	Sibsagar	33.93	
8	Bherjan-Borajan-Padumoni Wildlife Sanctuary	Tinsukia	7.22	
9	Nambor Wildlife Sanctuary	Karbi Anglong	37.00	
10	East Karbi-Anglong Wildlife Sanctuary	Karbi Anglong	222.81	
11	Laokhowa Wildlife Sanctuary	Nagaon	70.13	
12	Chakrashila Wildlife Sanctuary	Dhubri and Kokrajhar	45.57	
13	Marat Longri Wildlife Sanctuary	Karbi Anglong	451.00	
14	Nambor-Doigrung Wildlife Sanctuary	Golaghat	97.15	
15	Borail Wildlife Sanctuary	Cachar and Dima Hasao	326.25	
16	Amchang Wildlife Sanctuary	Kamrup Metro	78.64	
17	Deepar Beel Wildlife Sanctuary	Kamrup Metro	4.1	1989

Proposed Wildlife Sanctuaries

- North Karbi Anglong Wildlife Sanctuary
- Bordoibam Bilmukh Bird Wildlife Sanctuary 11.25

== Biosphere reserve ==
- Manas
- Dibru-Saikhowa

== See also ==
- List of protected areas of India
