= Ban Ta Khun district =

Ban Ta Khun บ้านตาขุน
- District
- District location in Surat Thani province
- Coordinates: 8°54′18″N 98°53′6″E
- Country: Thailand
- Province: Surat Thani
- Seat: Khao Wong

Area
  - Total: 1,308.2 km^{2} (505.1 sq mi)

Population (2005)
  - Total: 14,116
  - Density: 10.8/km^{2} (28/sq mi)
- Time zone: UTC+7 (ICT)
- Postal code: 84230
- Geocode: 8409

Ban Ta Khun (Thai: บ้านตาขุน, pronounced [bâːn tāː kʰǔn]) is an amphoe in western Surat Thani province, southern Thailand. It is the largest district of the province and has the lowest population density.

== Geography ==
Most of the district is in the hills of the Phuket Range, with parts being protected in Khao Sok National Park and the Khlong Saeng Wildlife Sanctuary. Mostly in Ranong Province is the Khlong Nakha Wildlife Sanctuary, which occupies the northwestern corner of the district.

The main river of the district is the Khlong Saeng, which is dammed by the Ratchaprapha Dam to form the Cheow Lan reservoir. It empties near the town Khao Wong into the Phum Duang River.

Neighboring districts are (from north clockwise): Tha Chang, Vibhavadi, Khiri Rat Nikhom and Phanom of Surat Thani; Khura Buri of Phang Nga province; and Suk Samran and Kapoe of Ranong province.

== History ==
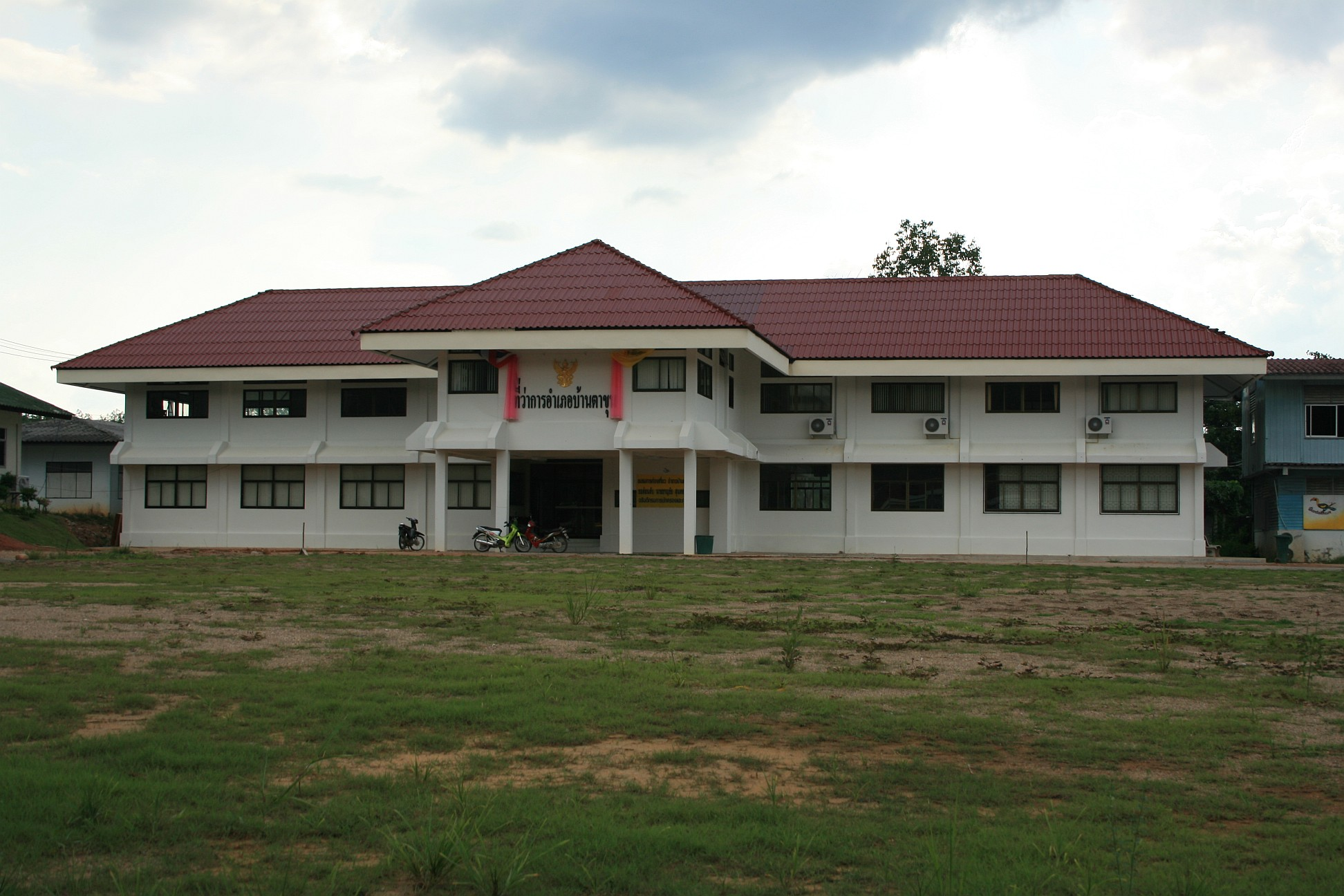
District office

The district was created on 20 July 1973 as a minor district (king amphoe) by splitting off five tambons from Khiri Rat Nikhom.

On 9 September 1976 the minor district was elevated to full district status.

The fifth tambon Krai Son (ไกรสร) was later merged into Khao Phang, as it was in the area flooded by Cheow Lan lake.

== Symbols ==
The slogan of the district is "High mountains, beautiful dam, rich in fruits, outstanding virtue, origin of the trunks for the city pillar".

== Administration ==
The district is divided into four tambons, which are further subdivided into 29 villages (mubans). There are two sub-district municipalities (thesaban tambon): Khao Wong (to be renamed Ban Ta Khun) covers 7.8 km^{2} of tambon Khao Wong, and Khao Pang 10.1 km^{2} of tambon Khao Pang. Each of the four tambons, except the areas covered by the municipalities, is administered by a tambon administrative organization (TAO).

No.	Name	Thai name	Villages	Pop.
1.	Khao Wong	เขาวง	6	4,303
2.	Phasaeng	พะแสง	9	3,158
3.	Phru Thai	พรุไทย	9	2,648
4.	Khao Phang	เขาพัง	5	4,007

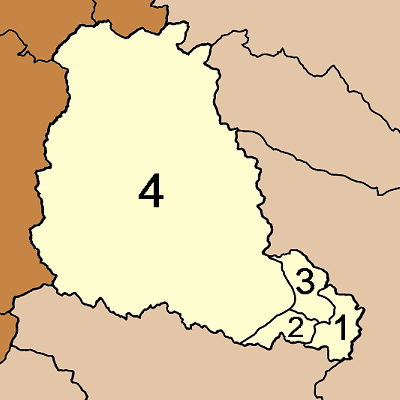
Map of subdistricts
