= Rajjaprabha Dam =

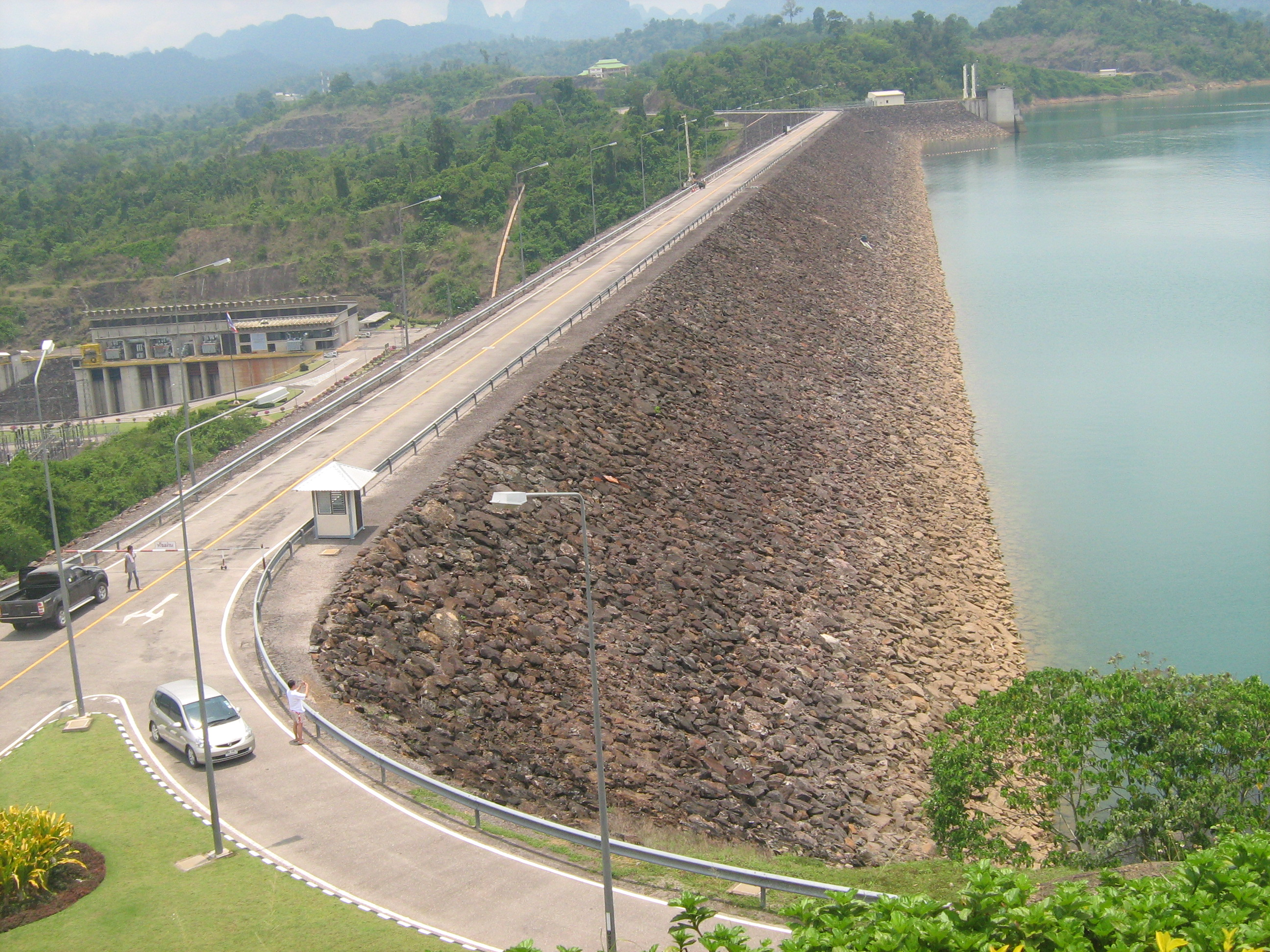
- Country: Thailand
- Location: Ban Ta Khun District
- Purpose: Power, irrigation
- Status: Operational
- Construction began: 1982
- Opening date: 1987

Dam and spillways
- Type of dam: Embankment, rock-fill
- Height: 95 m (312 ft)
- Length: 761 m (2,497 ft)

Reservoir
- Total capacity: 5,639,000,000 m^{3} (4,572,000 acre⋅ft)
- Surface area: 185 km^{2} (71 sq mi)

Power Station
- Turbines: 3 x 80 MW
- Installed capacity: 240 MW

Rajjaprabha Dam (Thai: เขื่อนรัชชประภา, RTGS: Khuean Ratchaprapha, pronounced [kʰɯ̀a̯n rát.t͡ɕʰā.prā.pʰāː]) or Cheow Lan Dam (เขื่อนเชี่ยวหลาน, RTGS: Khuean Chiao Lan, pronounced [kʰɯ̀a̯n t͡ɕʰîa̯w lǎːn]) is a multi-purpose dam in Ban Cheow Lan, Tambon Khao Phang, Ban Ta Khun District, Surat Thani Province. Its purpose is electricity generation, irrigation, flood control, and fishing. Construction started on 9 February 1982. It was inaugurated on 30 September 1987. King Bhumibol Adulyadej gave the dam the name "Rajjaprabha", meaning 'light of the kingdom'.

Rajjaprabha is a rockfill dam with clay core. It is 95 meters high, 761 meters long, with a capacity of 5,639 million m^{3} of water, covering 185 km^{2}. The power plant houses three 80 MW generators, totalling 240 MW of generating capacity.

The lake attracts over 70,000 tourists every year. Due to its scenery, it has been called "Guilin, Thailand". Much of the lake is under the supervision of Khao Sok National Park.

== See also ==
- Cheow Lan Lake
