= Nambor - Doigrung Wildlife Sanctuary =

Wildlife sanctuary in Assam, India

- IUCN category IV (habitat/species management area)
- Interactive map of Nambor - Doigrung Wildlife Sanctuary
- Location: Assam, India
- Nearest city: Golaghat
- Area: 97.15 sq. km.
- Established: 2003; 23 years ago
- Governing body: Department of Environment & Forests, Assam

Nambor - Doigrung Wildlife Sanctuary is a Morangi located in Golaghat district of Assam in India. This wildlife sanctuary covers an area of 97.15 km^{2}. It is located 25 km from Golaghat town and about 318 km from Guwahati LGBI Airport. The forest type is tropical semi-evergreen with pockets of pure evergreen, interspersed with small forest marshes. The area was declared as a Wildlife sanctuary in 2003. The sanctuary along with Garampani Wildlife Sanctuary (6 km^{2}) and Nambor Wildlife Sanctuary (37 km^{2}) are a part of the Kaziranga-Karbi Anglong Elephant Reserve, which was declared on 17 April 2003, with an estimated area of 3,270 km^{2}.

== Biodiversity ==
Flora
Bhelu, Gomari, Ajar, Nahor, Udiyam, Poma, Bon Som etc. It harbors some rare species of orchids.

Fauna
elephant, hoolock gibbon, stumped tailed macaque, pig tailed macaque, slow loris, Assamese macaque, rhesus macaque, tiger, leopard, fishing cat, barking deer, sambar, wild pigs, gaur, etc.

Birds
white winged wood duck, great pied hornbill, wreathed hornbill, adjutant stork, etc.

Reptiles
tortoise, monitor lizard, python, etc.

== See also ==
- Nambor Wildlife Sanctuary
- Garampani Wildlife Sanctuary
- List of protected areas of Assam
