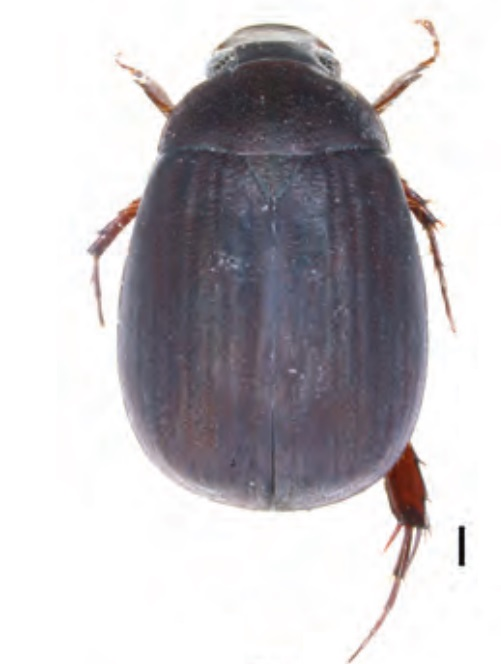

Scientific classification
- Kingdom: Animalia
- Phylum: Arthropoda
- Class: Insecta
- Order: Coleoptera
- Suborder: Polyphaga
- Infraorder: Scarabaeiformia
- Family: Scarabaeidae
- Genus: Maladera
- Species: M. namborensis

Binomial name
- Maladera namborensis Ahrens & Fabrizi, 2016

= Maladera namborensis =

Species of beetle

Maladera namborensis is a species of beetle of the family Scarabaeidae. It is found in India (Assam, Meghalaya).

== Description ==
Adults reach a length of about 9.2 mm. They have a dark reddish brown, dull, oval body. Except for some setae on the head, the dorsal surface is nearly glabrous.

== Etymology ==
The species is named after the Nambor forest reserve in Assam.
