= Bherjan-Borajan-Padumoni Wildlife Sanctuary =

Coordinates: 27.53°N 95.37°E

Bherjan-Bokajan-Padumoni Wildlife Sanctuary
- IUCN category IV (habitat/species management area)
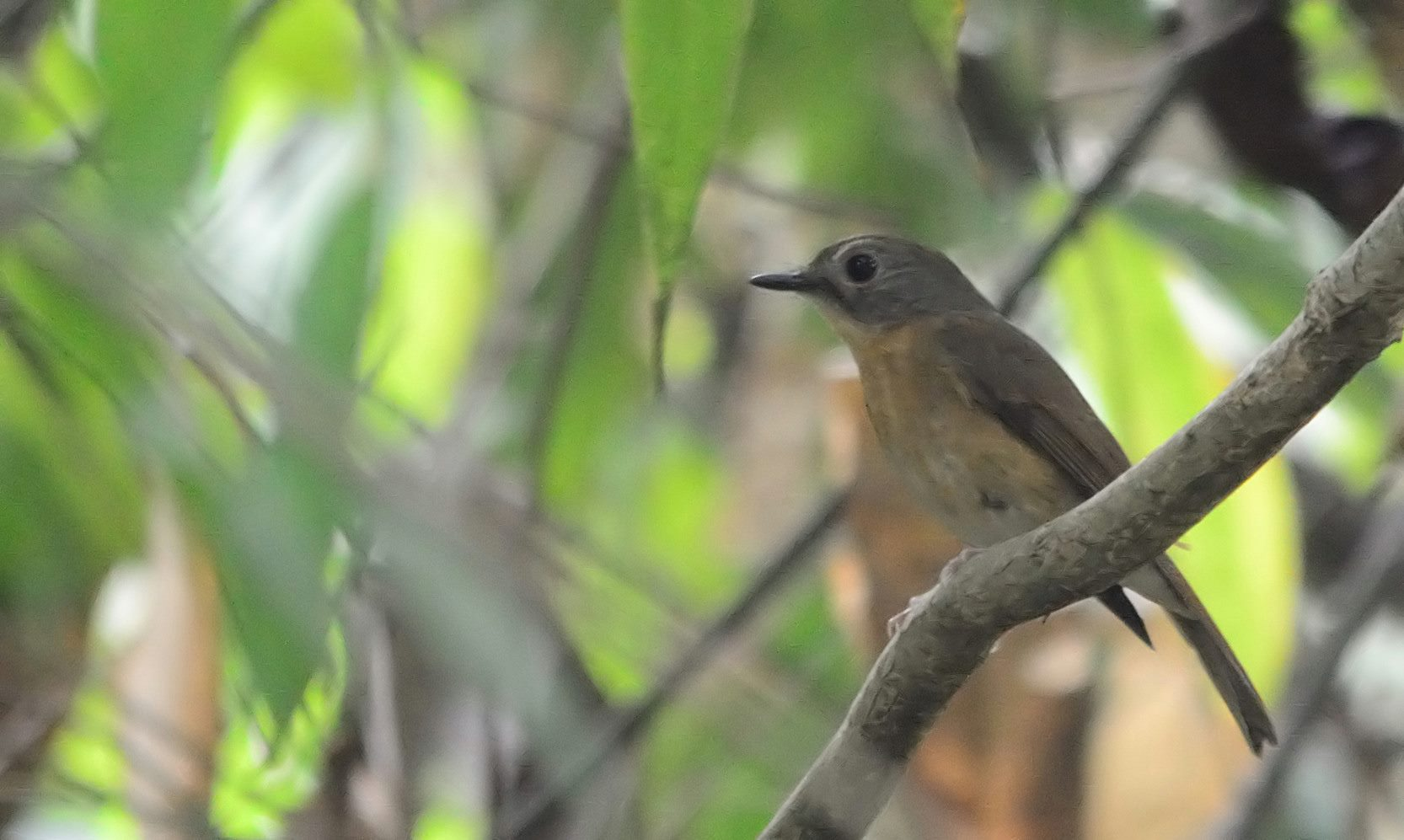

- Location within Assam Location within India
- Interactive map of Bherjan-Bokajan-Padumoni Wildlife Sanctuary
- Location: Assam, India
- Nearest city: Tinisukia
- Area: 7.22 sq. km
- Established: 1999
- Governing body: Department of Environment & Forests, Assam

Bherjan Bokajan Padumoni Wildlife Sanctuary is a protected area located in Tinsukia district of Assam located in India covering 7.22 km^{2}. This wildlife sanctuary is spread across three blocks located in Tinsukia district of Upper Assam which consist of three separate forests, namely Bherjan, Borajan and Padumoni. It is a very important forest in terms of conservation and includes habitat for animals such as hoolock gibbon, capped langur, pig-tailed macaque, slow loris, rhesus macaque, leopard, etc.

84 species of birds were recorded here.

== See also ==
- Protected areas of Assam
