= North Karbi-Anglong Wildlife Sanctuary =

Proposed protected area in Assam, India

- Location within India
- Nearest city: Jorhat
- Coordinates: 25°33′N 92°10′E
- Area: 96 km^{2} (37 sq mi)
- Established: Proposed

North Karbi-Anglong Wildlife Sanctuary is a proposed protected area and wildlife sanctuary located in the Karbi Anglong district of the Indian state of Assam.

== Description ==
Located to the south of the Kaziranga National Park, the sanctuary covers an area of 96 km^{2} (37 sq mi) and is contiguous with the East Karbi-Anglong Wildlife Sanctuary.

Fauna found in the sanctuary include Indian elephant, Bengal tiger, gaur, barking deer, sambar deer, sloth bear, rhesus macaque, hoolock gibbon, capped langur, and slow loris.
