= Mebo giant flying squirrel =

Scientific classification
- Kingdom: Animalia
- Phylum: Chordata
- Class: Mammalia
- Infraclass: Placentalia
- Order: Rodentia
- Family: Sciuridae
- Genus: Petaurista
- Species: P. siangensis

Binomial name
- Petaurista siangensis Choudhury, 2013

Species of mammal

The Mebo giant flying squirrel (Petaurista siangensis) is a species of rodent in the family Sciuridae. It was first described in 2013 from the East Himalayan forests of Upper Siang District, Arunachal Pradesh in India.

It is one of the three recently discovered flying squirrel species of Arunachal Pradesh, along with the Mishmi giant flying squirrel and Mechuka giant flying squirrel.
