= Phalaenopsis cacharensis =

Conservation status
- Critically Endangered (IUCN 3.1)

Scientific classification
- Kingdom: Plantae
- Clade: Tracheophytes
- Clade: Angiosperms
- Clade: Monocots
- Order: Asparagales
- Family: Orchidaceae
- Subfamily: Epidendroideae
- Genus: Phalaenopsis
- Subgenus: Phalaenopsis subg. Ornithochilus
- Species: P. cacharensis

Binomial name
- Phalaenopsis cacharensis Barbhuiya, B.K.Dutta & Schuit.

Synonyms
- Ornithochilus cacharensis Barbhuiya, B.K.Dutta & Schuit.

Species of orchid

Phalaenopsis cacharensis is a rare orchid native to Cachar, Assam which has only one plant ever recorded. The single plant was discovered by Hussain Ahmed Barbhuiya of the Botanical Survey of India while doing field work in the Borail Wildlife Sanctuary. The specific epithet, cacharensis refers to the district where it was found.

== Description ==
Phalaenopsis cacharensis is a monopodial epiphyte with mid-green leaves that are 19.0–21.0 cm × 3.0–4.3 cm, with a sheathing base that is 1.0–1.2 cm long. The flowers are red-purple, 1.7 cm in diameter, held on inflorescences that are 35–38 cm long, with branches holding 30-70 flowers.

== Habitat ==
The only specimen was found growing on the trunk of Duabanga grandiflora at 130 m elevation in wet evergreen lowland forest. The plant is critically endangered, with the plant threatened by local slash and burn farming and tree cutting.
