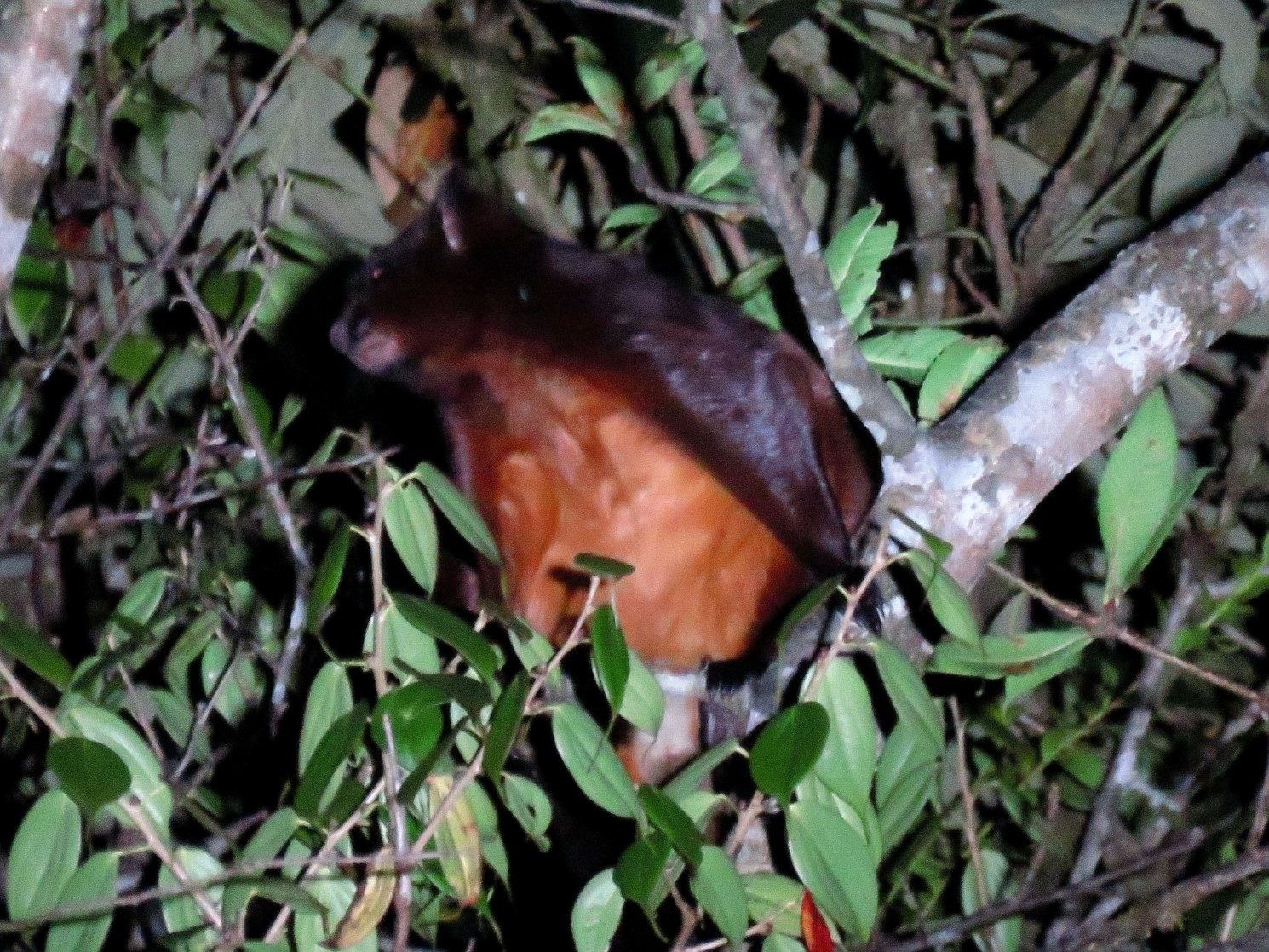

Conservation status
- Near Threatened (IUCN 3.1)

Scientific classification
- Kingdom: Animalia
- Phylum: Chordata
- Class: Mammalia
- Order: Rodentia
- Family: Sciuridae
- Genus: Petaurista
- Species: P. mishmiensis

Binomial name
- Petaurista mishmiensis Choudhury, 2009

= Mishmi giant flying squirrel =

Species of rodent

The Mishmi giant flying squirrel (Petaurista mishmiensis) is a species of rodent in the family Sciuridae. First described in 2009, the taxonomic status and position of this giant flying squirrel is not fully resolved. It is one of three flying squirrel species from Arunachal Pradesh recently described by Anwaruddin Choudhury, along with the Mebo giant flying squirrel and Mechuka giant flying squirrel.

== Description ==
Among giant flying squirrels, Petaurista mishmiensis has a conspicuous black-coloured tail. Tails of this species have been found in hunting villages near Hunli.

== Distribution and habitat ==
Petaurista mishmiensis lives in broadleaf and coniferous forests, in temperate montane and subtropical ecosystems.

It is described as living in East Himalayan forests at altitudes of 600–1,600 m (2,000–5,200 ft) in the Mishmi Hills of northeastern Arunachal Pradesh in India. It may also occur just across the border, in the neighbouring Siang and Lohit river valleys of Tibet.

It has been observed to inhabit areas dominated by Rhododendron and Quercus (oak) species. Many birdwatchers have sighted it at the Mayodia Pass area of Mehao Wildlife Sanctuary.

== Conservation ==
According to the International Union for Conservation of Nature, the population of the Mishmi giant flying squirrel is experiencing slow decline, "due to hunting, construction, an increased human population, and shifting agriculture." The species is hunted for its meat, and occasionally killed in festivals or ritual hunts. It has been assessed as Near Threatened since 2013.
