= Borail Wildlife Sanctuary =

Wildlife sanctuary in Assam, India

- IUCN category IV (habitat/species management area)
- Interactive map of Borail Wildlife Sanctuary
- Location: Cachar district, Assam, India
- Area: 326.24 km^{2} (125.96 sq mi)
- Established: 2004

Barail Wildlife Sanctuary is located in the southern part of Assam, India, in the Cachar district, and lies between 24°55΄53΄΄-25°05΄52΄΄ N latitude and 92°27΄40΄΄-93°04΄30΄΄ E longitude. The Dima Hasao part of Barail is not part of this sanctuary. The altitude ranges between 55–1500 m above mean sea level. It spreads over 326.24 km^{2}. The annual average rainfall and temperature range from 2500–4000 mm and 9.2 °C to 36.2 °C respectively; the humidity varies from 62% to 83%. Fieldworks in the Barail area were proposed as a national park or sanctuary in the 1980s.

== History ==
The sanctuary consists of the North Cachar Reserved Forest and Barail Reserved Forest, located within the Cachar district. The habitat has been classified as moist tropical evergreen and semi-evergreen forests. The forest is home to a wide diversity of wildlife. Mammals found in Barail Sanctuary include slow loris, hoolock gibbon, capped langur, Assamese macaque, pig-tailed macaque, stump-tailed macaque, rhesus monkey, Himalayan black bear, Malayan sun bear, leopard cat, jungle cat, golden cat, clouded leopard, barking deer, red serow and wild pig. With more than 300 species of birds, the sanctuary is a birdwatcher's paradise. Some noteworthy species found include White-backed vulture, Slender-billed vulture, Rufous-throated and White-cheeked hill partridges, Grey peacock pheasant, Kaleej pheasant, Great pied hornbill, Oriental pied hornbill, Rufous-necked hornbill, Wreathed hornbill, and Austen's brown hornbill. Reptiles include the Burmese rock python and king cobra.

Besides the above, the sanctuary also harbors a high diversity of floral wealth, e.g., Ornithochilus cacharensis, an epiphytic orchid species, Larsenianthus assamensis a terrestrial zingiber species; Diospyros cacharensis, a small deciduous tree belonging to the family Ebenaceae; and Alseodaphne keenanii a large tree belonging to the family Lauraceae, were described for the first time for this sanctuary, and all are endemic to north-east India.

The nearest town is Silchar, which is 40 km away. The sanctuary is also a good destination for trekkers.
