= Khao Sok National Park =

National park in Surat Thani, Thailand

- IUCN category II (national park)
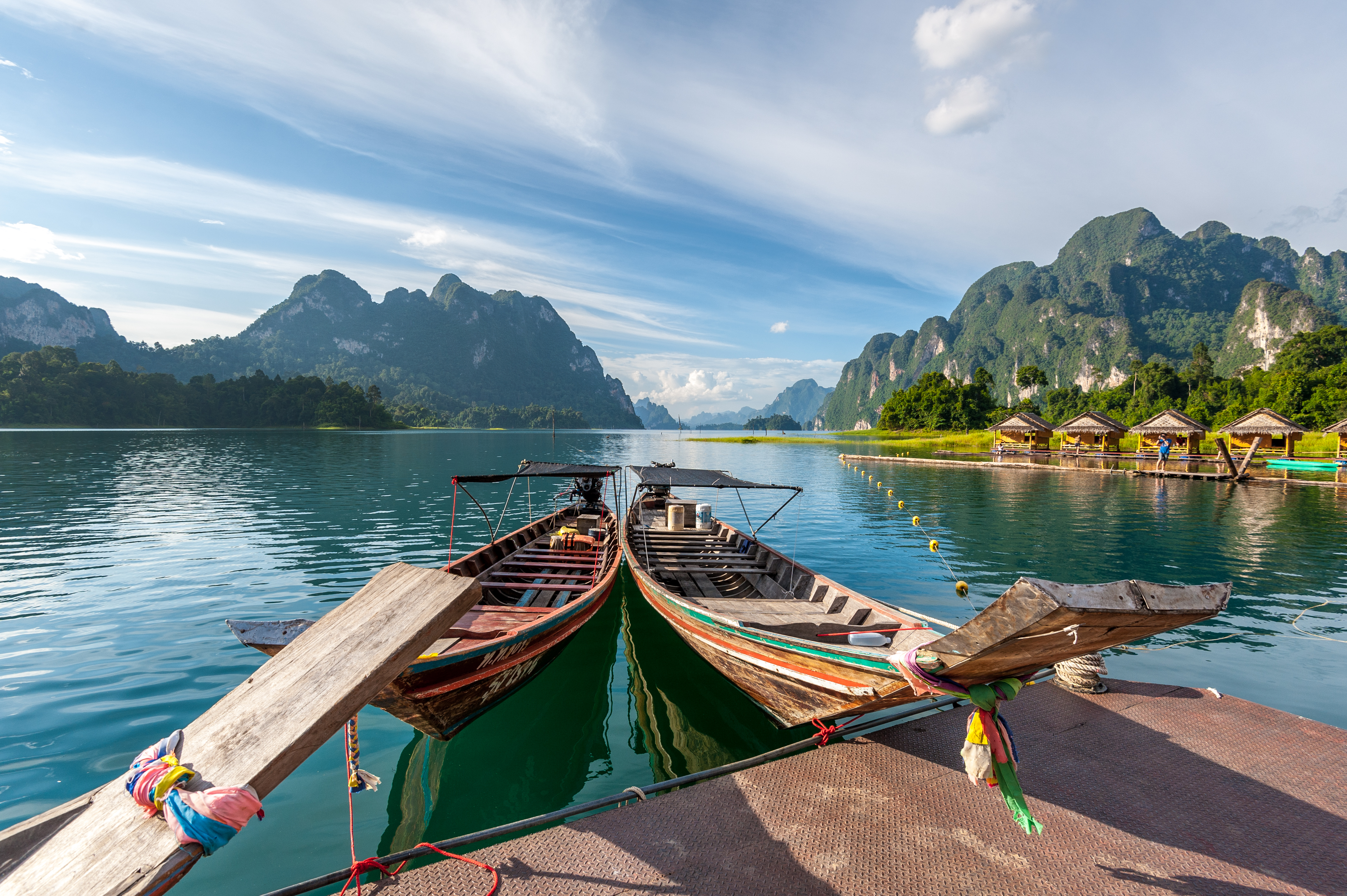
- Khao Sok
- Interactive map of Khao Sok National Park
- Location: Surat Thani Province, Thailand
- Nearest city: Surat Thani
- Coordinates: 8°56′12″N 98°31′49″E
- Area: 739 km^{2} (285 sq mi)
- Established: 22 December 1980
- Visitors: 419,470 (in 2019)
- Governing body: Department of National Park, Wildlife and Plant Conservation (DNP)
- Website: https://www.tourismthailand.org/Attraction/khao-sok-national-park

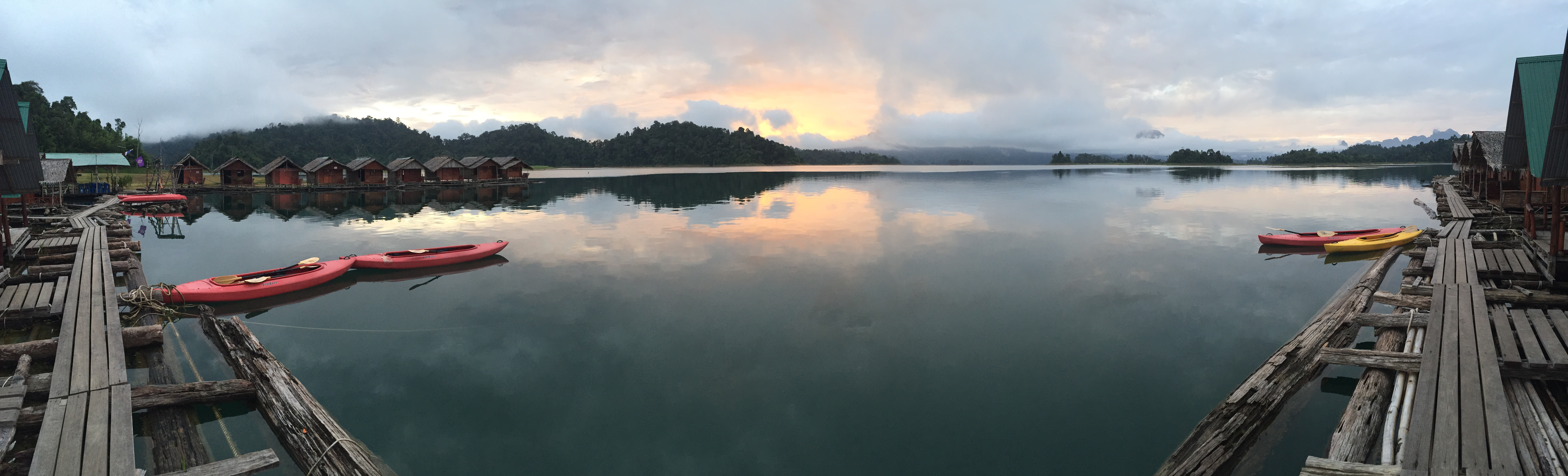
Sunrise in Khao Sok National Park

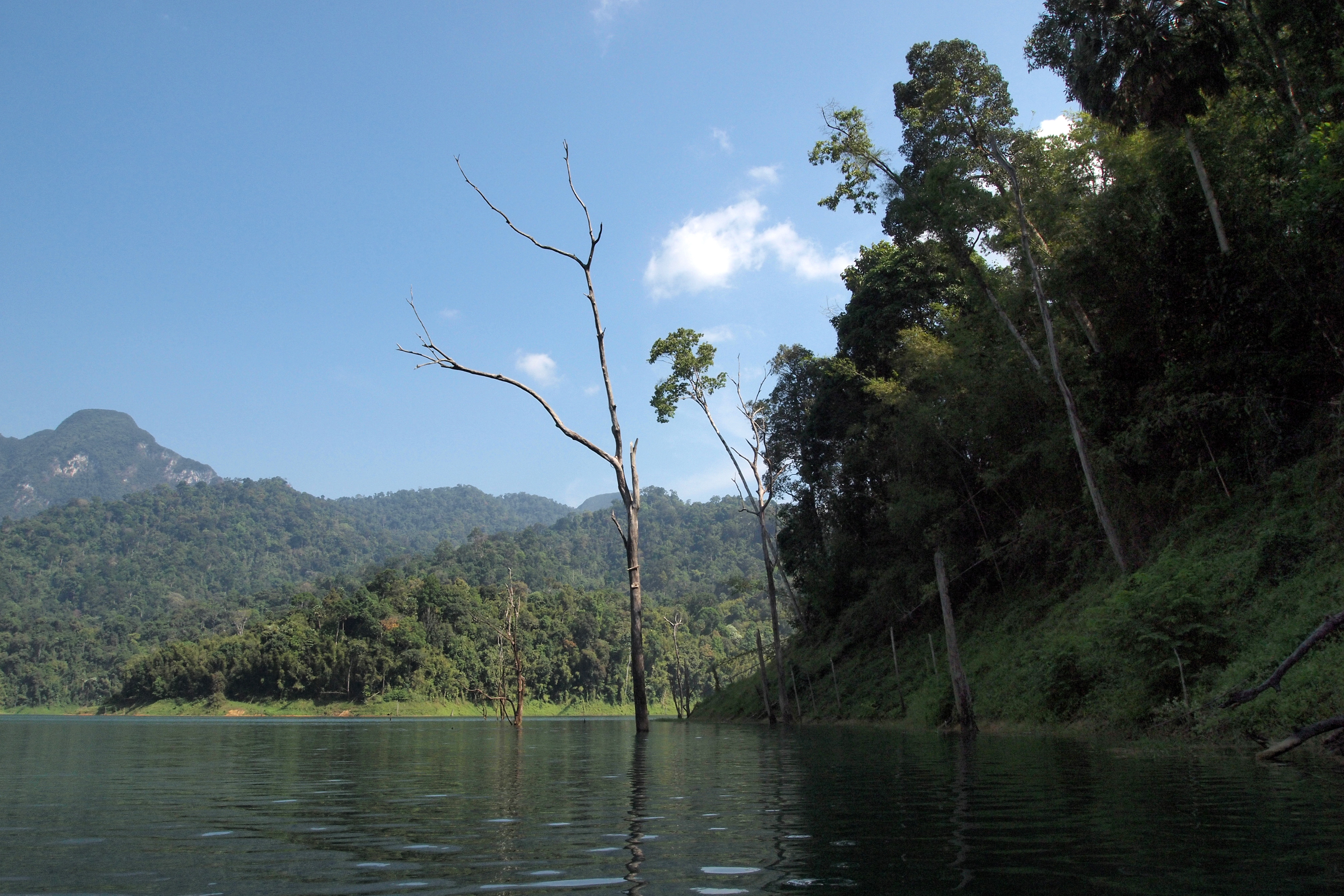
Khao Sok view from a kayak

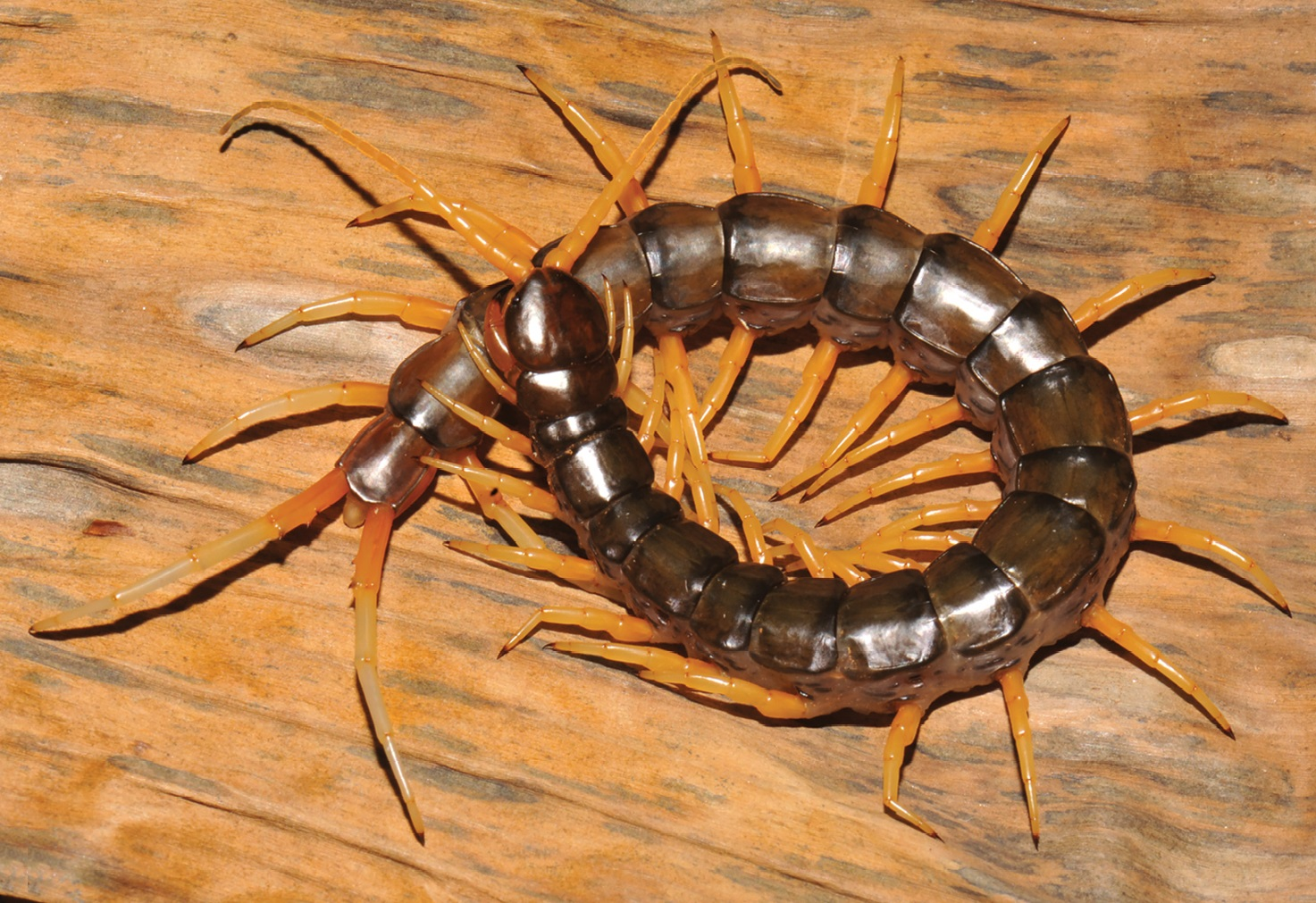
Scolopendra cataracta, the world's only known amphibious centipede, discovered near the park in 2001

Khao Sok National Park (Thai: เขาสก, pronounced [kʰǎw sòk]) is in Surat Thani Province, Thailand. Its area is 461,712 rai ~ 739 square kilometres (285 sq mi), and it includes the 165 km^{2} (64 sq mi) Cheow Lan Lake contained by the Ratchaprapha Dam. The park is the largest area of virgin forest in southern Thailand and is a remnant of rain forest which is older and more diverse than the Amazon rainforest.

== Geography ==
Sandstone and mudstone rocks rise about 300–600 m (984–1,969 ft) above sea level. The park is traversed by a limestone mountain range from north to south with a high point of 950 m (3,117 ft). This mountain range is hit by monsoon rain coming from both the Gulf of Thailand and the Andaman Sea, which makes it among Thailand's wettest regions with an annual rain fall of 3,500 mm (137.8 in). Heavy rainfall and falling leaves led to the erosion of the limestone rocks and created the significant karst formations seen today.

== Flora ==
Bamboo holds topsoil very tenaciously, preventing soil erosion on hillsides and riverbanks. With more than 1,500 species, bamboo is the oldest grass in the world, dating back nearly 60 million years. Liana trees grow rapidly wrapping around any vertical or horizontal support base such as takian or "rain trees". Thus, it's dangerous to simply cut a tree in the jungle because it can pull connected liana vines with it creating a cascade of damage. Buttress roots are enlarged root bases mostly of trees that grow above the upper canopy. The theory about these roots is that they either developed in order to be more grounded in storms and rain or that they spread out on the ground in order to get more nutrients.

Many kinds of wild fruit can be found around the national park and serve as sustenance for animals. Among those fruits are wild jackfruit, mangosteen, durian, rambutan, jujube, pomelo, and wild bananas. Wild pepper and ginger are not uncommon. Khao Sok National Park is perhaps most famous for the bua phut (Rafflesia kerrii) flower.

The palm species Kerriodoxa elegans is endemic to peninsular Thailand and Khao Sok is one of only two locations it is known from. The species has been assessed as endangered on the IUCN Red List and grows at lower elevations.

== Wildlife ==
The park is estimated to contain over five percent of the world's species. Wild mammals include Malayan tapir, Asian elephant, sambar deer, bear, gaur, banteng, serow, wild boar, pig-tailed macaque, langur, white handed gibbons, squirrel, muntjak, mouse deer, and barking deer.

Many websites claim the presence of tigers in Khao Sok National Park. There have been historical records up until a few decades back but there is no trail cam evidence that they still exist in Khao Sok or within the surrounding forest complex.

The world's first known amphibious centipede, Scolopendra cataracta, was discovered on a stream bank near the national park in 2001.

Khao Sok on the part of the Ratchaprapha Dam is also the last natural habitat in Thailand of the Asian arowana, an endangered living fossil fish.

== Climate ==
The so-called wet season is between late April–December. The temperature ranges from 22–36 °C (72–97 °F) all year around. Humidity and warm temperature provide the optimal environment for a rich eco-system in this tropical rain forest.

	Jan	Feb	Mar	Apr	May	Jun	Jul	Aug	Sep	Oct	Nov	Dec
Max. Day Temp., °C	30	32	33	33	31	30	30	30	30	29	29	29
Min. Day Temp., °C	20	20	21	22	23	22	22	22	22	22	21	21
Water Temp., °C	27	28	28	29	29	29	28	28	28	28	28	27
Daylight, hours	12	12	12	12	13	13	13	12	12	12	12	12
Rainfall, mm	41	33	62	148	320	373	372	369	447	332	210	89

== Natural history ==
This area is estimated to be over 160 million years old, built through tectonic movements, climate changes, erosions and sediment accumulations. Approximately 300 million years ago, shallow water and warm temperatures in this region led to the creation of a huge coral reef. Estimated to be 5 times as big as the Great Barrier Reef in Australia, it originally stretched from China all the way to Borneo. Due to the collision of the Indian and Eurasian plate 0-66 million years ago, the Himalayas were formed, and what is now Thailand shifted dramatically near the continental divide and the limestone rocks were forced upward creating the dramatic limestone "karsts" for which the region is known today. Finally, melting ice established the river-rich landscape as well as dozens of waterfalls around the national park.

== Human history ==
The first migrants to Thailand migrated during the Ice Age from Borneo around 37,000 BCE.

The first accounts of people living in Khao Sok were found in the 1800s, during the reign of Rama II. In the Burmese-Siamese War (1809-1812), the Burmese army invaded the western portion of the area, forcing the inhabitants to flee inland. They found the area to be extremely alluring, in beauty, wildlife abundance, and good soil. As news spread of this discovery, more people immigrated to settle the region.

In 1944, the inhabitants of this region were stricken by a deadly epidemic. A large number of the villagers died while the few survivors escaped from the area to settle in nearby Takua Pa.

In 1961, Route 401 was built from Phun Pin in Surat Thani Province to Takua Pa in Phang Nga Province. At the turn of the millennium, they began the process of expanding Route 401 to a 4 lane freeway.

In the 1970s, Thai student activists and communist insurgents set up strongholds in the caves of Khao Sok. Settled in the shelter of the rainforest they protected the region from the Thai army, loggers, miners, and hunters for seven years.

Khao Sok became a national park in 1980. The government and the Electricity Generating Authority of Thailand (EGAT) were interested in this region because Khao Sok holds the largest watershed in southern Thailand.

Only 2 years later, EGAT completed the 94 m (308 ft) high Ratchaprapha Dam, blocking off the Klong Saeng River, a tributary of the Phum Duang River and creating a 165 km^{2} (64 sq mi) lake inside the park. The dam provides electricity for the south, and the lake became a major holiday destination for Thai and foreign tourists alike. There were several species of animals that had to be resettled to save them from drowning, as the lake slowly filled over a period of 3 years. Unfortunately, a study from 1995 revealed the loss of some 52 species of fish from the river, which could not survive in the stagnant water.

== Activities ==
Khao Sok National Park has numerous outdoor activities for tourists.

Trekking: During the day, tourists can enter the West Entrance Due to hike the maintained trails. Sightings of monkeys, tropical birds and insects are common, however its possible to find wild elephants, serow, and Malayan sun bears. Rafflesia Kerrii Meijer can be found in the area. Those interested in trekking can hire a local guide. Guides are required for night tours. Tourists may stay in the rainforest overnight.

Canoeing and Bamboo rafting: Sok River is known for beautiful views along the river. There are local guides for tourists to hire for canoeing and bamboo rafting tours.

Boat Tours: Tours on Cheow Lan Lake is the most popular tourist destination in the park, due to the picturesque limestone cliffs and turquoise waters. Across the lake, there are several caves to explore such as Diamond cave, Khang Cow Cave and Nam Talu cave. Nam Talu cave is about 12 km (7.5 mi) from the headquarters of Khao Sok National Park. Tour guides are available to boat visitors from the waterfall to the lake.

== Location ==
Khao Sok National Park in overview PARO 4 (Surat Thani)

2) Khao Sok National Park in overview PARO 4 (Surat Thani)

	National park
1	Keang Krung
2	Khao Sok
3	Khlong Phanom
4	Laem Son
5	Lam Nam Kra Buri
6	Mu Ko Ang Thong
7	Mu Ko Chumphon
8	Mu Ko Ranong
9	Namtok Ngao
10	Tai Rom Yen
11	Than Sadet–Ko Pha-ngan

	Wildlife sanctuary
12	Khuan Mae Yai Mon
13	Khlong Nakha
14	Khlong Saeng
15	Khlong Yan
16	Prince Chumphon; North Park (lower)
17	Prince Chumphon; South Park
18	Thung Raya Na-Sak

	Non-hunting area
19	Khao Tha Phet
20	Nong Thung Thong
	Forest park
21	Namtok Kapo

== Gallery ==
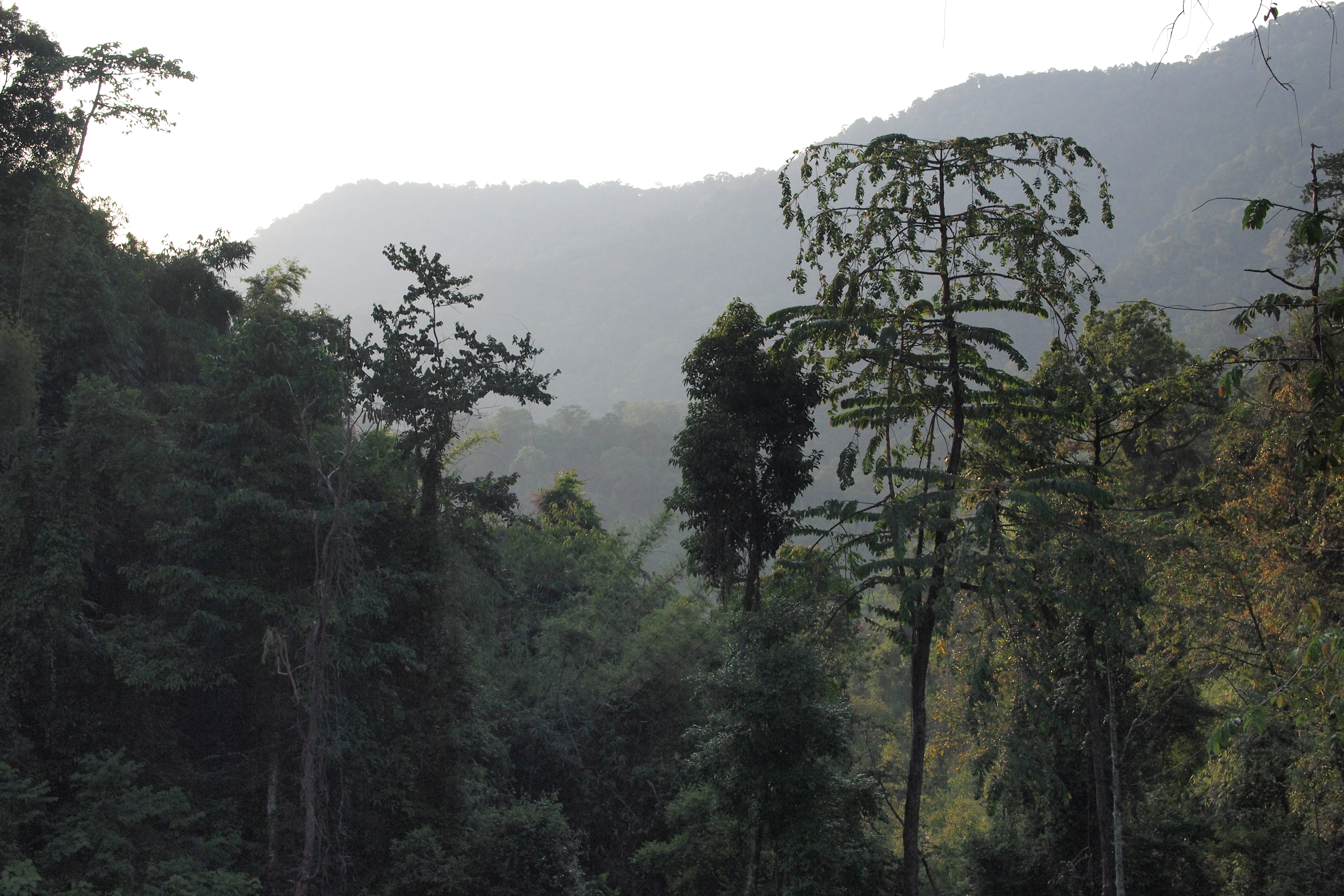
Khao Sok tropical rainforest.

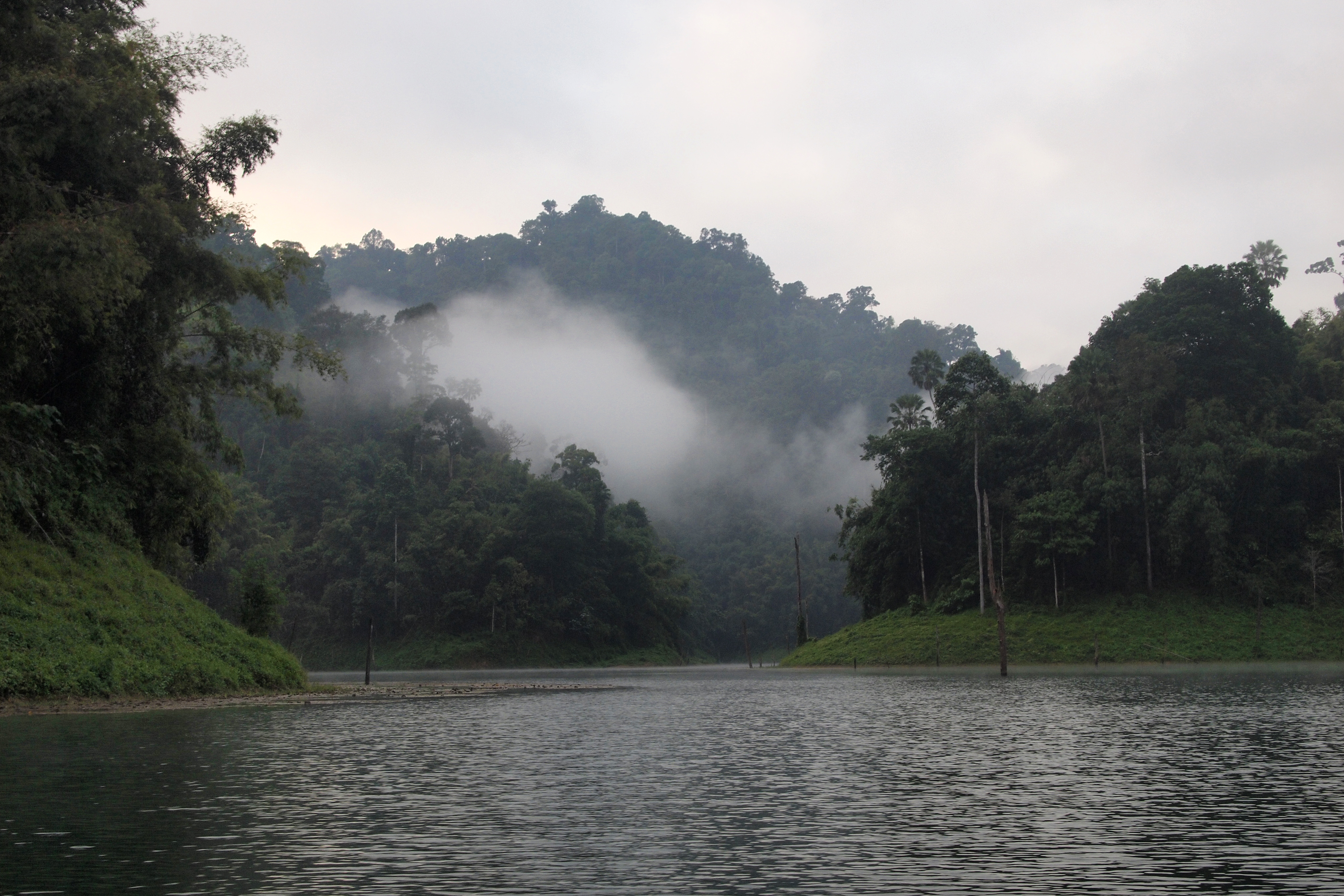
Early morning on Cheow Lan Lake.

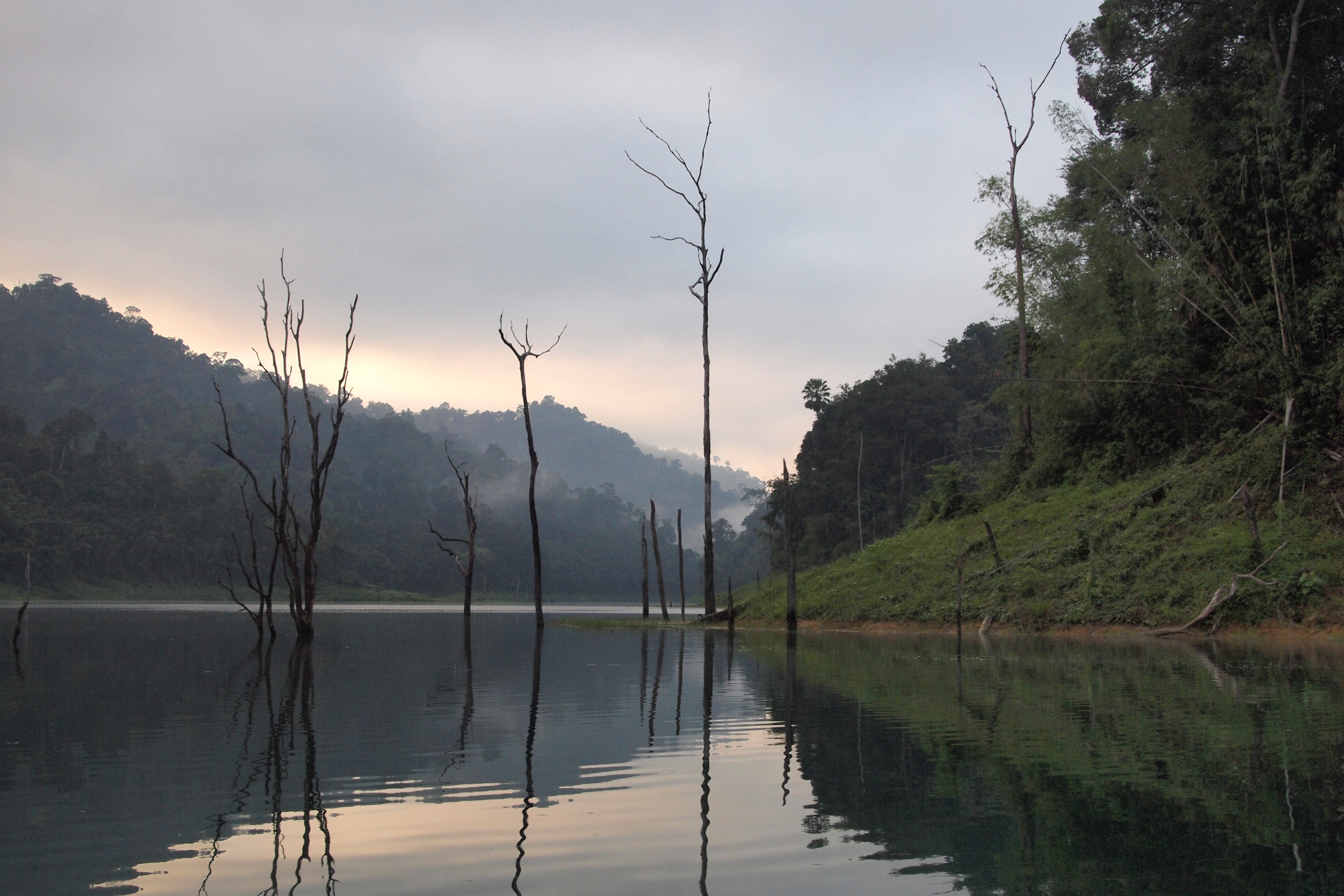
Early morning on Cheow Lan Lake.

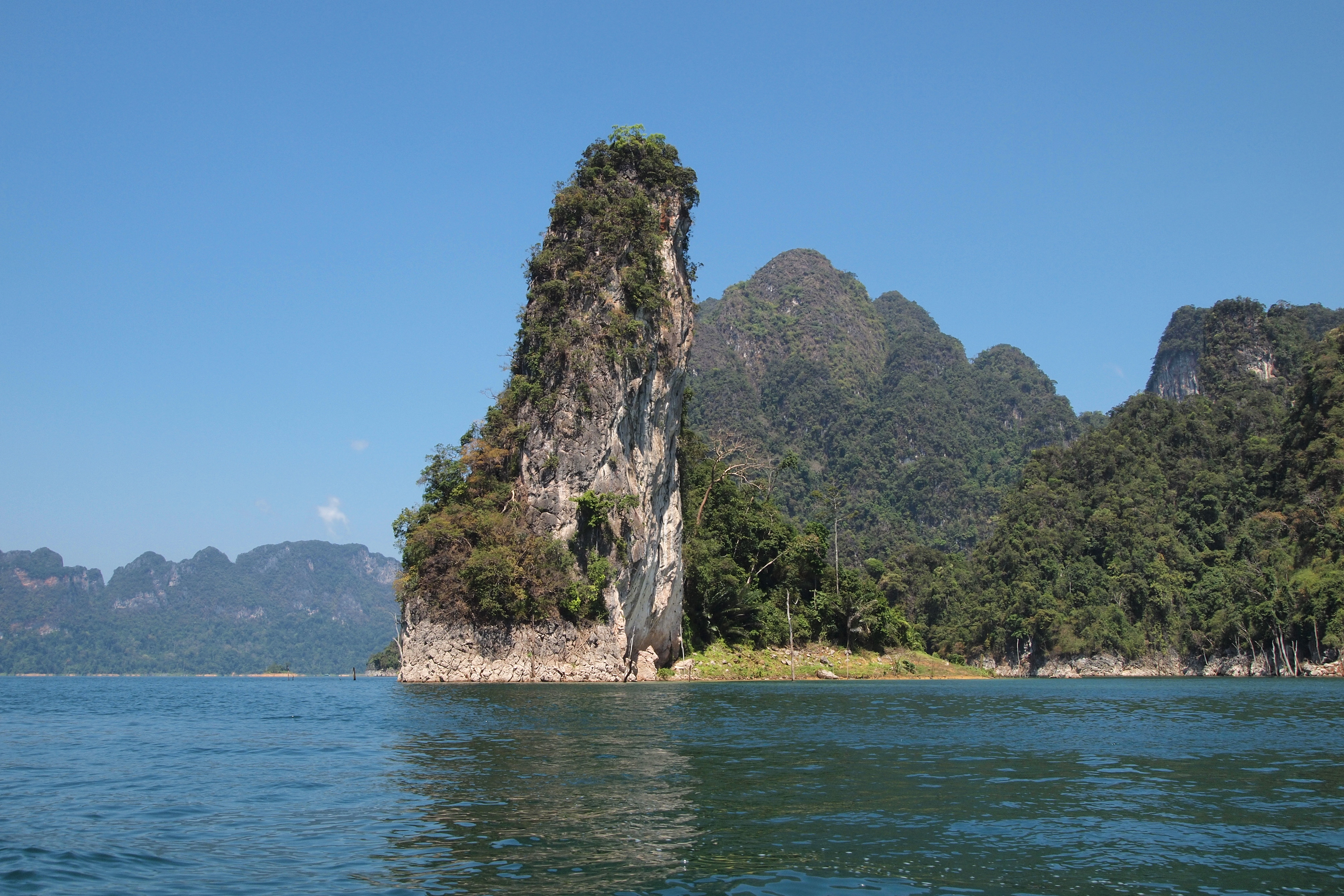
Karst formations on Cheow Lan Lake.

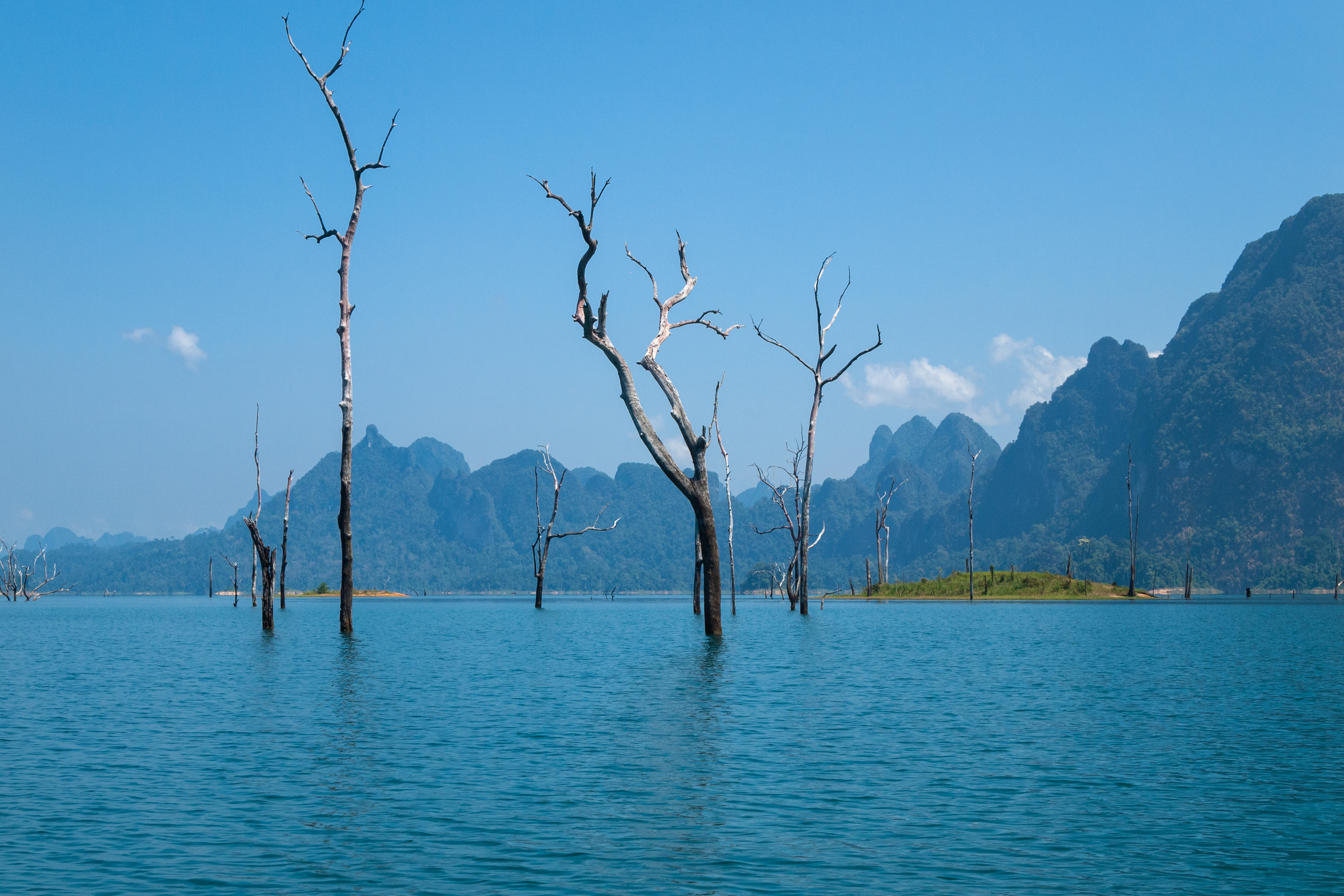
Trees rising out of Cheow Lan Lake.

== See also ==
- List of national parks of Thailand
- DNP - Khao Sok National Park
- List of Protected Areas Regional Offices of Thailand
