= Nambor Wildlife Sanctuary =

Wildlife reserve in India

- IUCN category IV (habitat/species management area)
- Location within Assam Location within India
- Interactive map of Nambor Wildlife Sanctuary
- Location: Assam, India
- Nearest city: Diphu
- Coordinates: 26°23′43″N 93°52′57″E
- Area: 37 km^{2} (14 sq mi)
- Established: 27 July 2000
- Governing body: Department of Environment & Forests, Assam

Nambor Wildlife Sanctuary is a protected area located in Karbi Anglong district of Assam in India. This wildlife sanctuary covers an area of 37 km^{2} (14 sq mi). The area was declared as a sanctuary on 27 July 2000. It is located 25 km (16 mi) from Golaghat district and 65 km (40 mi) from the Kaziranga National Park. Together with Garampani Wildlife Sanctuary of Karbi Anglong and Nambor-Doigrung Wildlife Sanctuary of Golaghat district it forms a larger complex of wilderness. The proposal for this sanctuary was made in 1993.

== Biodiversity ==
=== Flora ===
Bhelu, Gomari, Ajar, Nahor, Udiyam, Poma, Bonsum etc. It harbors 51 rare species of orchid.

=== Mammals ===
Chinese pangolin, slow loris, stump-tailed macaque, pig-tailed macaque, Assamese macaque, rhesus monkey, capped langur, hoolock gibbon, tiger, leopard, clouded leopard, leopard cat, fishing cat, jungle cat, elephant, barking deer, sambar, wild pig, gaur, Malayan giant squirrel and Asian brush-tailed porcupine

=== Birds ===
Some noteworthy species found includes White-backed vulture, Slender-billed vulture, White-cheeked hill partridge, Grey peacock pheasant, Kaleej pheasant, Red junglefowl White-winged wood duck, Green imperial pigeon, Great pied hornbill, Oriental pied hornbill, Wreathed hornbill, Hill myna among many others.

=== Reptiles ===
Burmese rock python, king cobra and monitor lizards among others.

== See also ==
- Garampani Wildlife Sanctuary
- Nambor - Doigrung Wildlife Sanctuary
