= Cheow Lan Lake =

Manmade lake in Thailand

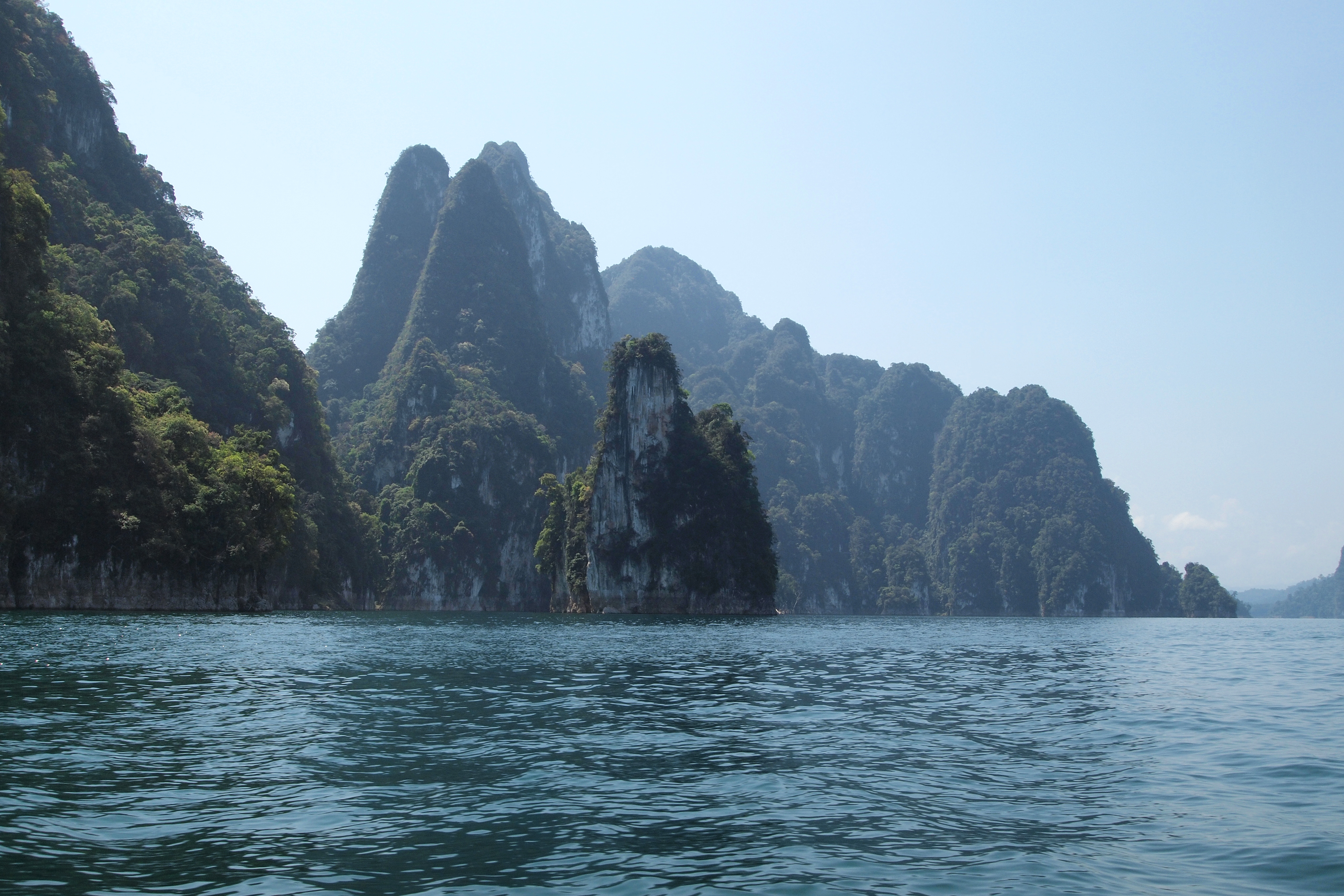
- Cheow Lan Lake

- Location within Thailand
- Location: Surat Thani province, Southern Thailand
- Coordinates: 8°58′36″N 98°48′16″E
- Type: Reservoir
- Primary outflows: Khlong Saeng River
- Catchment area: 1,435 km^{2} (554 sq mi)
- First flooded: 1987
- Surface area: 185 km^{2} (71 sq mi)
- Average depth: 40 m (130 ft) (average)
- Max. depth: 90 m (300 ft)

Cheow Lan Lake (Note: Also spelled Chiew Lan or Chiew/Cheow Larn) (Thai: เชี่ยวหลาน, RTGS: Chiao Lan) or Rajjaprabha Dam Reservoir (อ่างเก็บน้ำเขื่อนรัชชประภา, RTGS: Ratchaprapha~), is located in Khao Sok National Park in Surat Thani Province, Thailand. It is an 185-square-kilometre (71 sq mi) artificial lake, inaugurated in 1987 with the construction of Rajjaprabha Dam by the Electricity Generating Authority of Thailand (EGAT) as a source of electricity.

Cheow Lan Lake (Thai: เชี่ยวหลาน, RTGS: Chiao Lan) is fully man made by the Thailand government for the making of the Ratchaprapha (Rajjaprabha) Dam. The lake was an ancient tropical rainforest.

- The Submerged Villages: The schools, homes, and temples of the original villages are still sitting perfectly preserved at the very bottom of the lake, under up to 90 meters (300 feet) of water.

== Rajjaprabha Dam ==
Rajjaprabha Dam, meaning 'light of the kingdom', got its name in May 1987 from the king at the opening ceremony on the king's 60th birthday. Before that day it was called the "Cheow Lan Project". It was designed as a multi-purpose project for power generation, flood control, irrigation, and fishery. In 1982, the Electricity Generating Authority of Thailand (EGAT) started construction of the dam by diverting the Klong Saeng River. It took about one year to completely flood the 185 square kilometres (71 sq mi) basin. To flood this large area, 385 families of Ban Chiew Lan village were resettled. Rubber and other farming opportunities such as poultry, fruit orchards, vegetable farming, and reservoir fisheries were introduced together with the needed training programs and credit facilities to sustain farmers' incomes.

Each family received 19 rai (7.2 acres [2.9 ha]) of rubber plantation as well as one rai (0.39 acres [0.16 ha]) for their dwelling. As part of the compensation, the resettled people received 1,000 baht monthly per family. Resettlement drove the creation of basic public infrastructure, water supply systems, and public buildings such as schools, police station, medical center, and community hall—all built by the Thai government.

A resettlement of animals took place by boat and helicopter to prevent them from drowning or starving on new created islands. In 18 months 1,364 animals of 116 species were rescued, but 44 died soon after. Many fish species died due to the stagnant water conditions.

The average depth of the lake is around 40 m (130 ft) while the deepest point of the lake was estimated to be around 90 m (300 ft) deep.

== Wildlife ==
The national park area is inhabited by a range of mammals such as, elephants, tapirs and many monkey species. Birds such as hornbills, banded pittas, and great argus are as well forest residents. Less commonly seen reptiles include the king cobra, reticulated python, and flying lizards. The reservoir area includes the Khlong Saeng, Khlong Nakha and Kaeng Krung wildlife sanctuaries where rare animals can be found. West of Khao Sok National Park lies Sri Phang Nga National Park which extends the preservation area to 4,000 square kilometers.

== Gallery ==
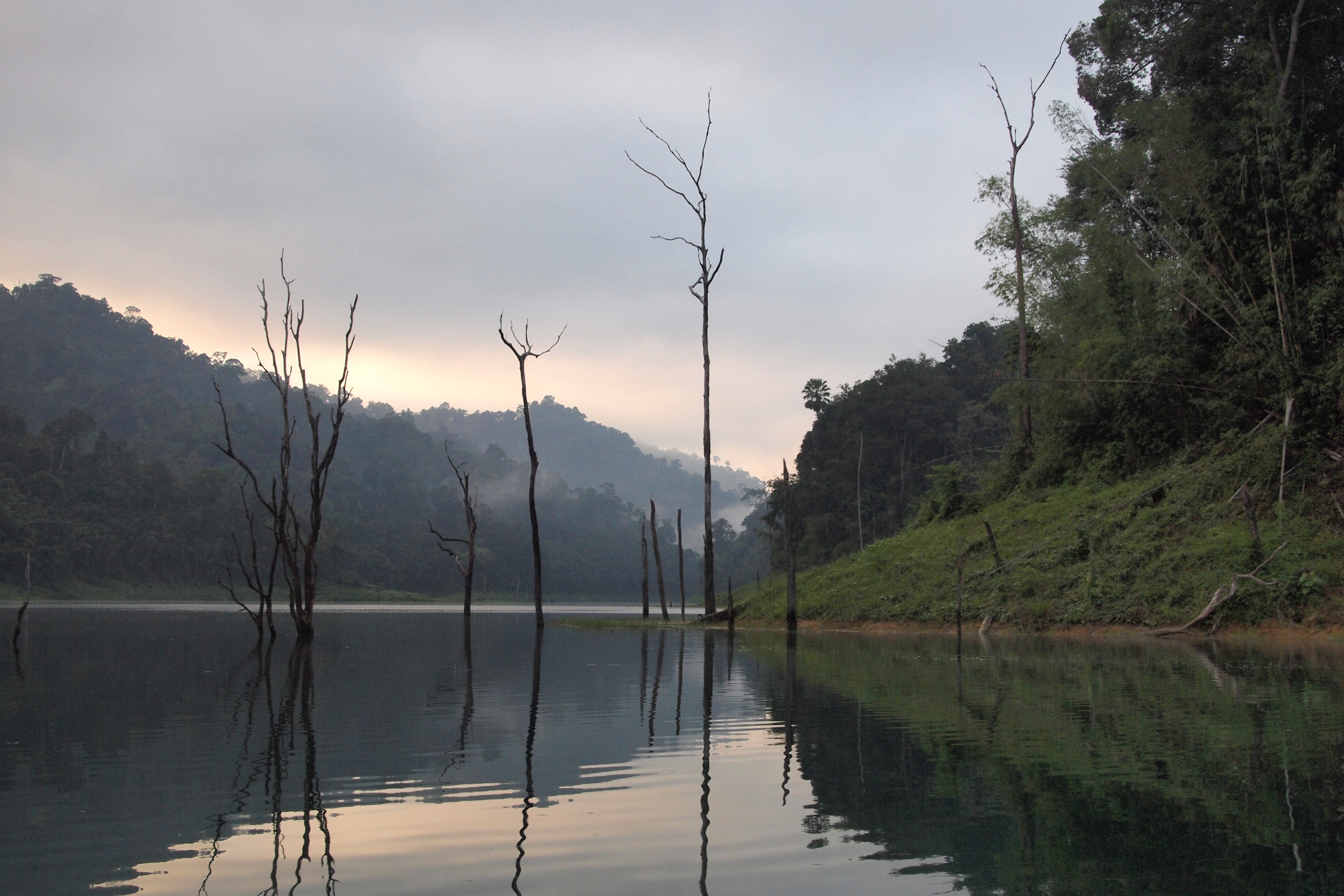
Early morning at Cheow Lan Lake

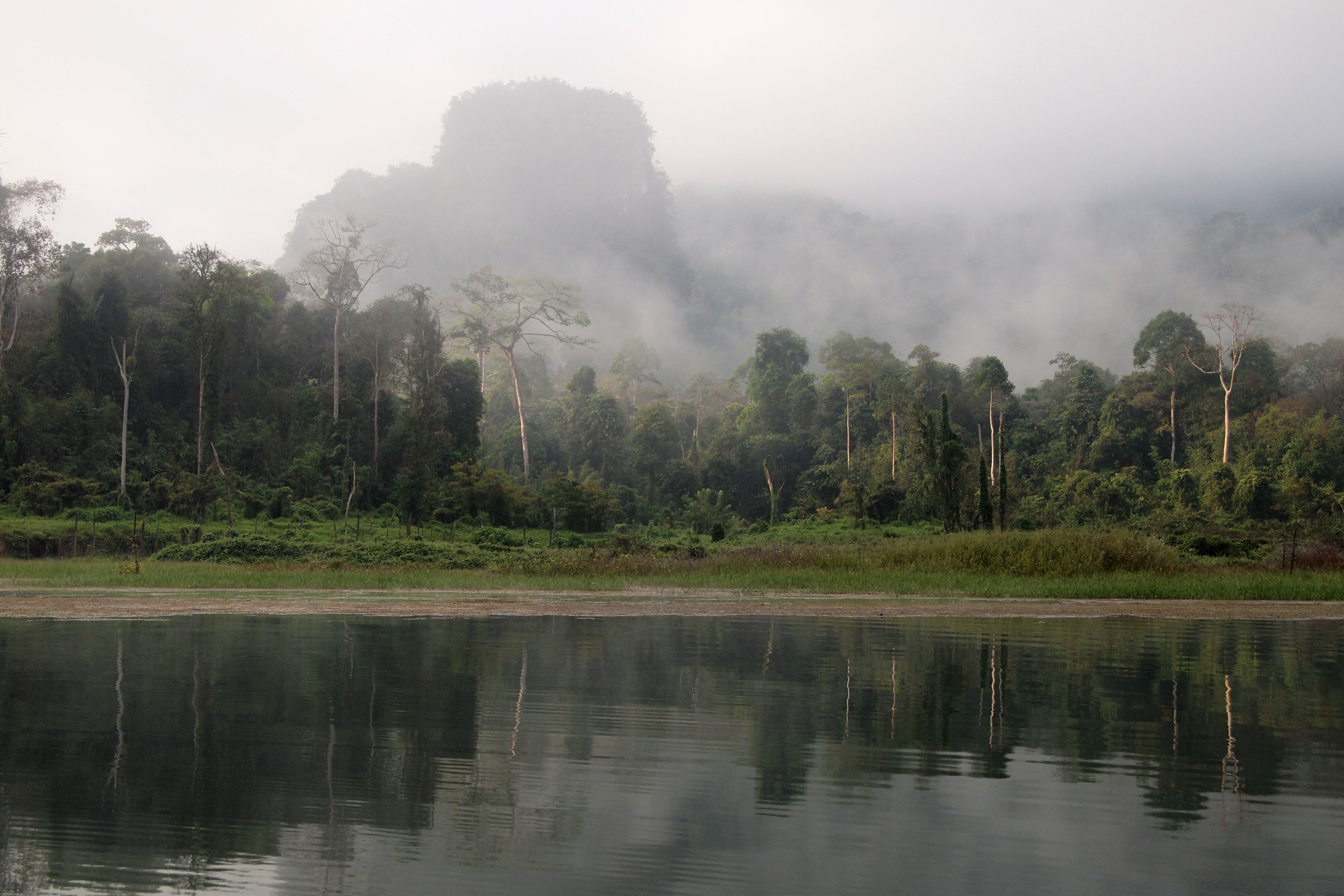
Primary tropical rainforest around Cheow Lan Lake

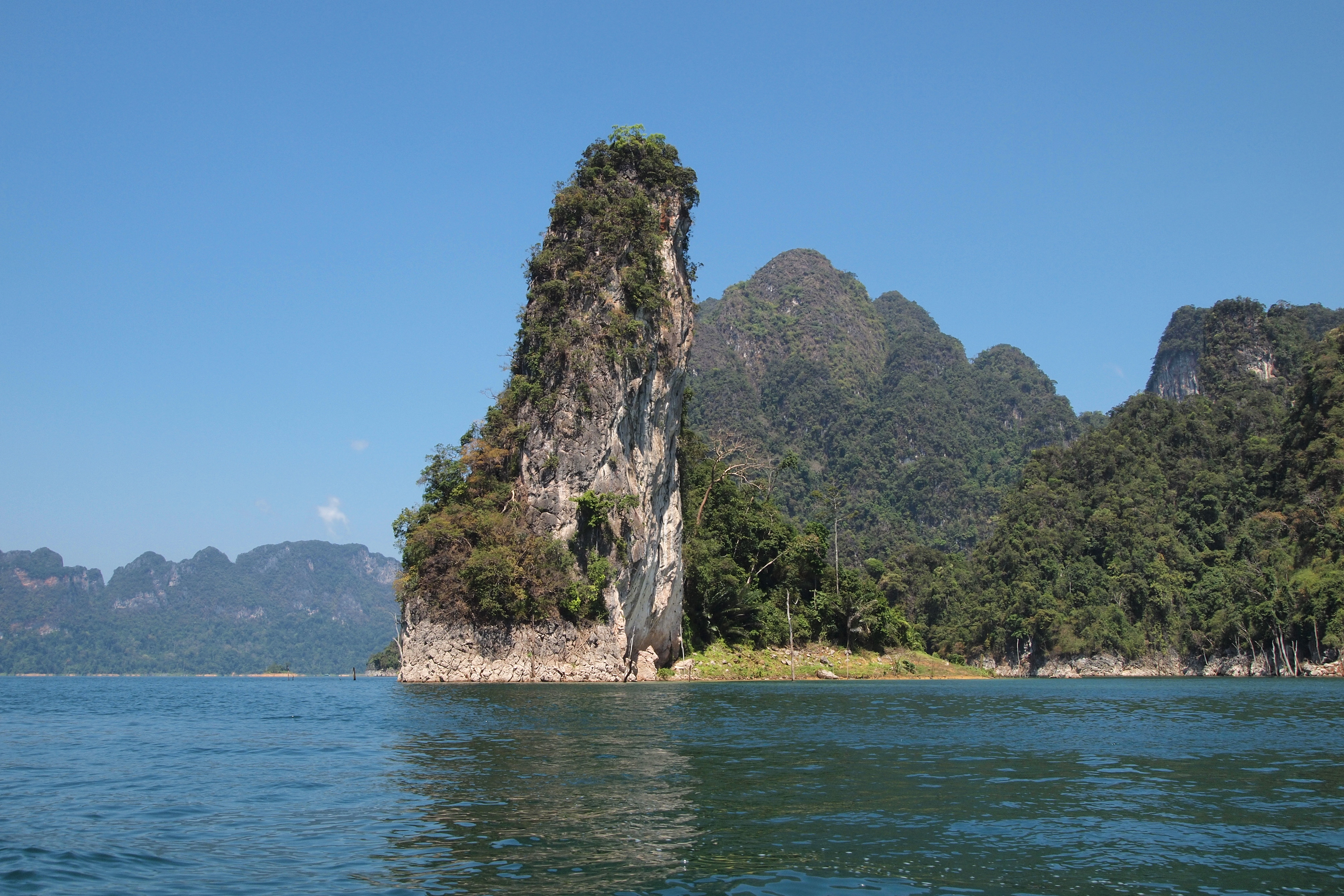
Cheow Lan Lake

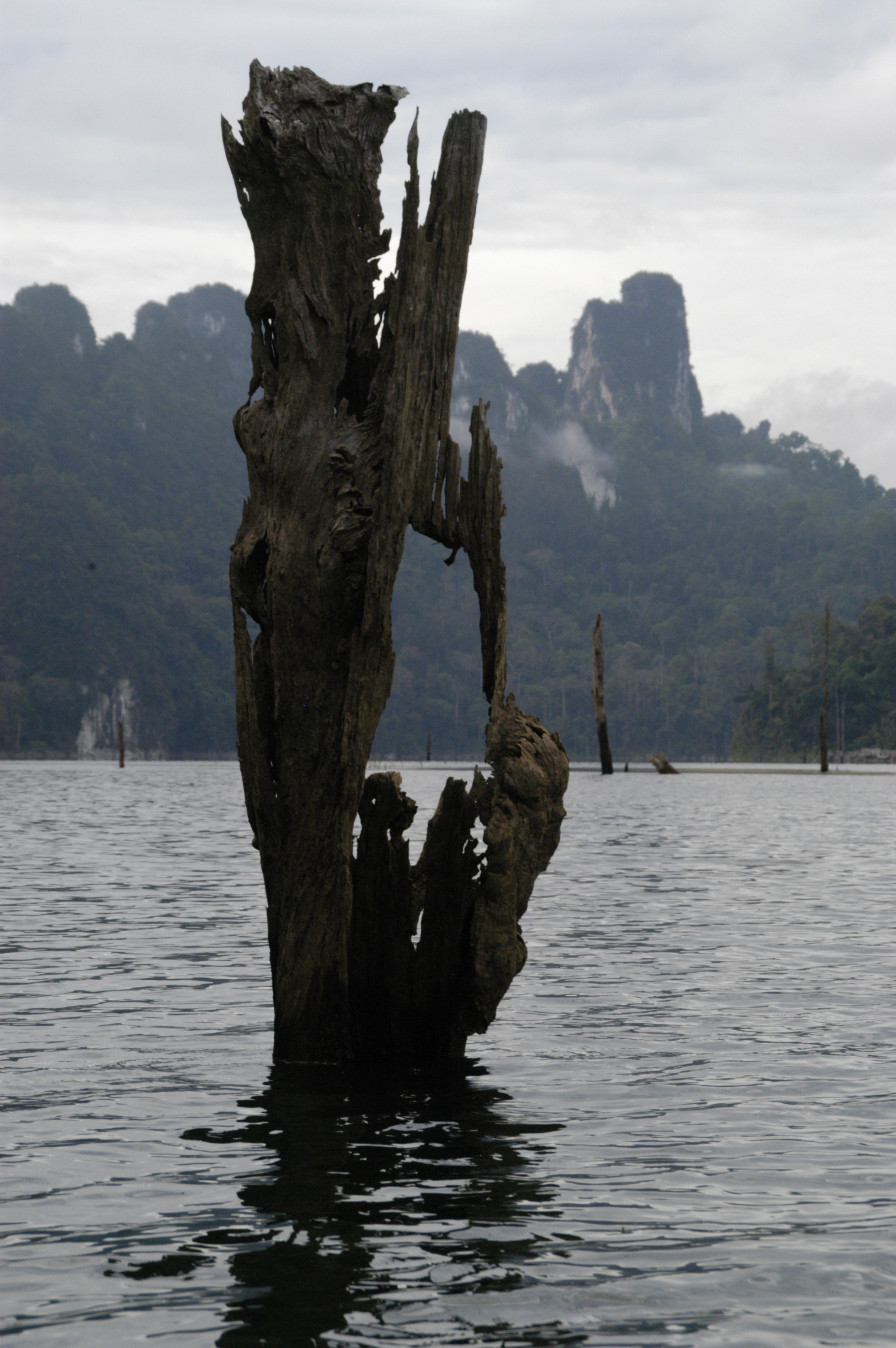
Evidence of the preexisting forest

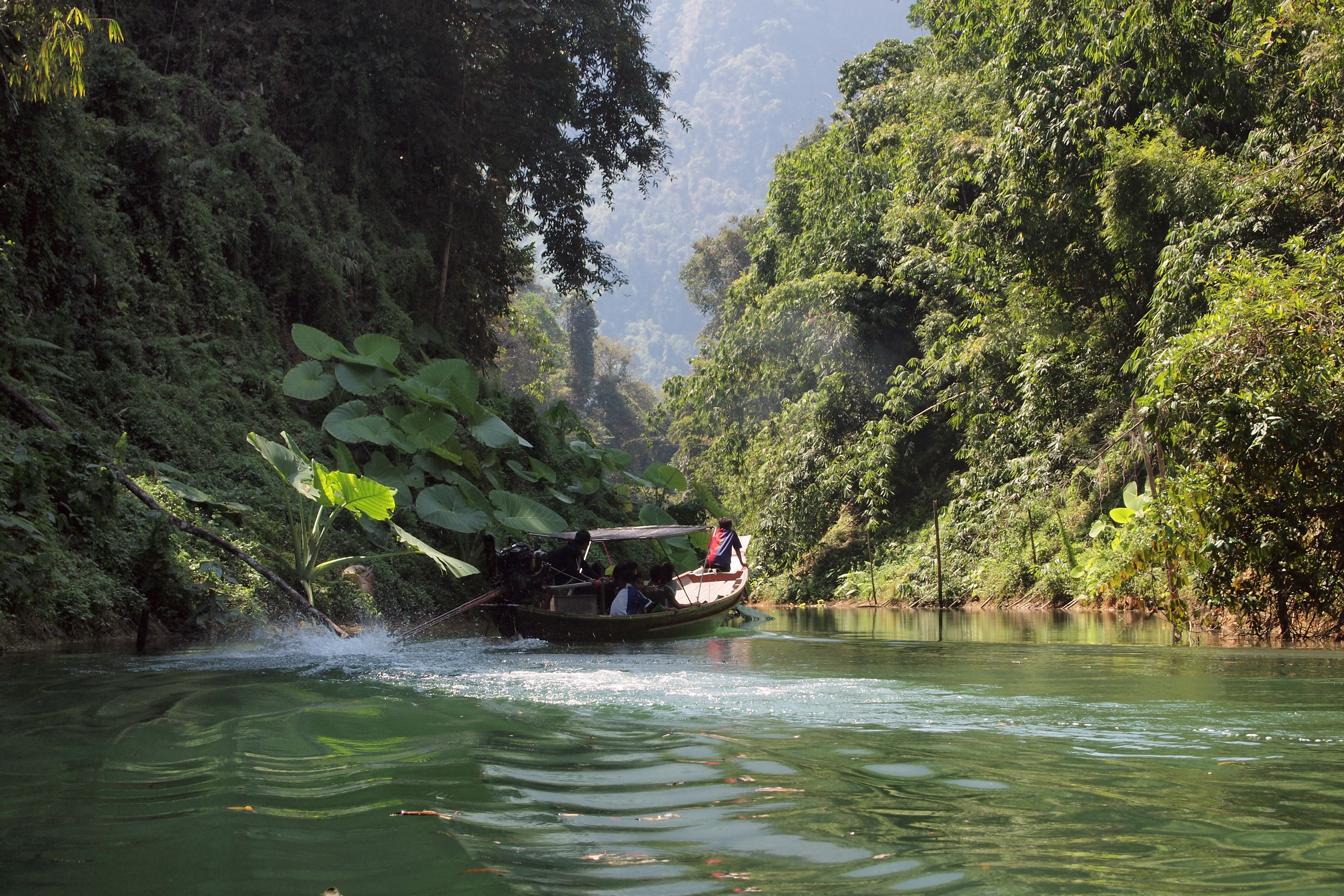
Rich flora, Lake shore

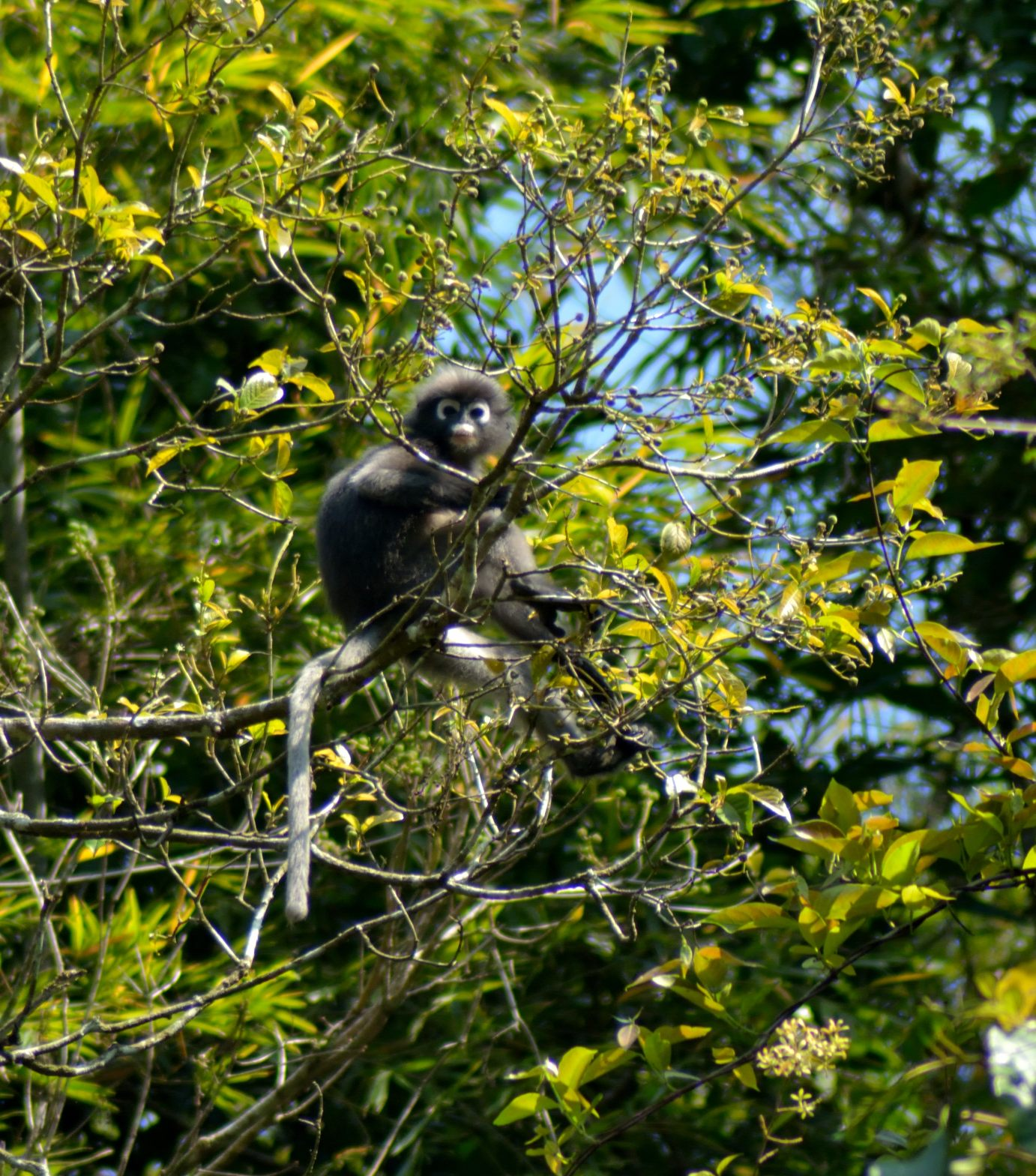
Dusky langur

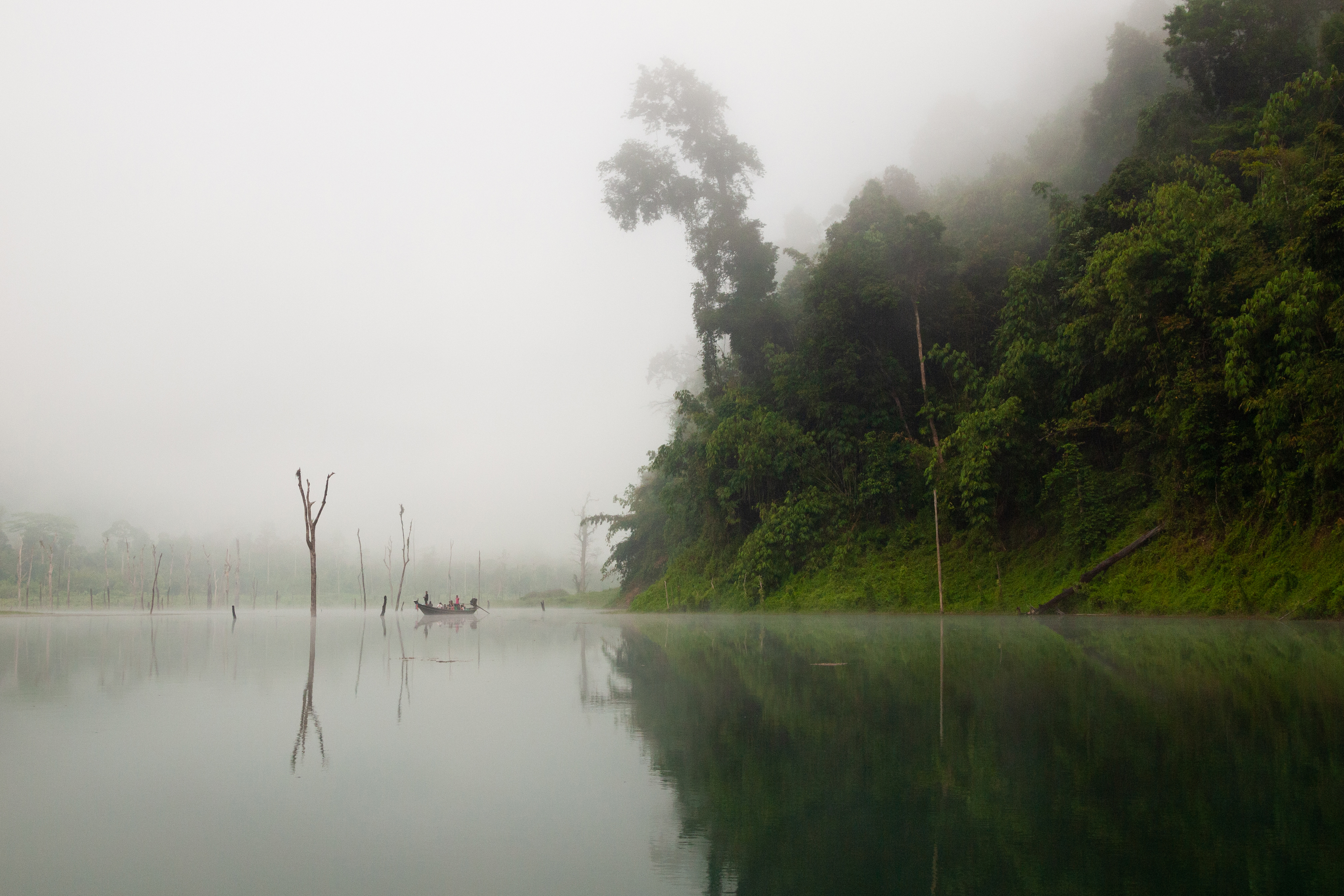
Kayaking on Cheow Lan Lake

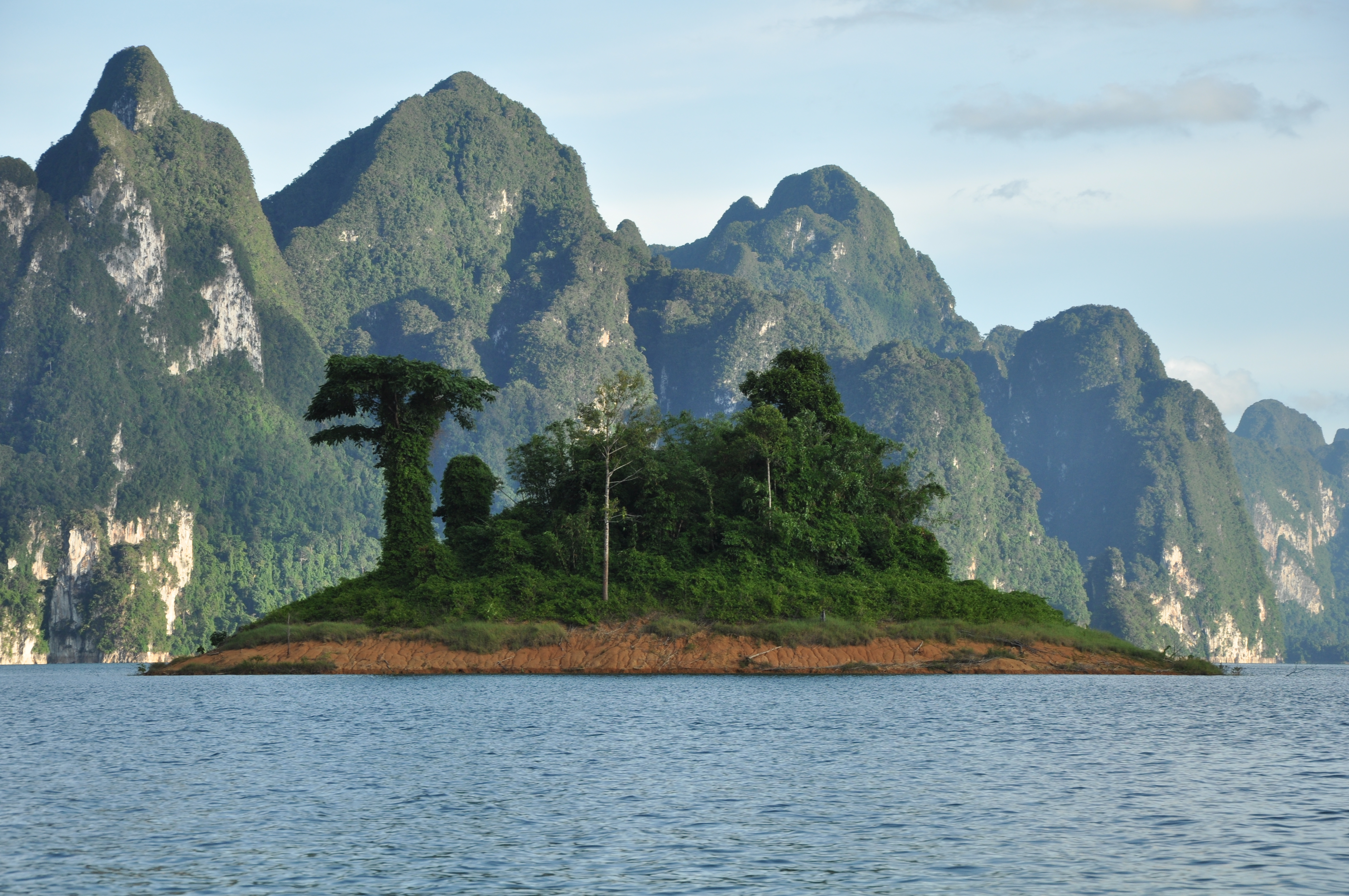
An Island in Cheow Lan Lake

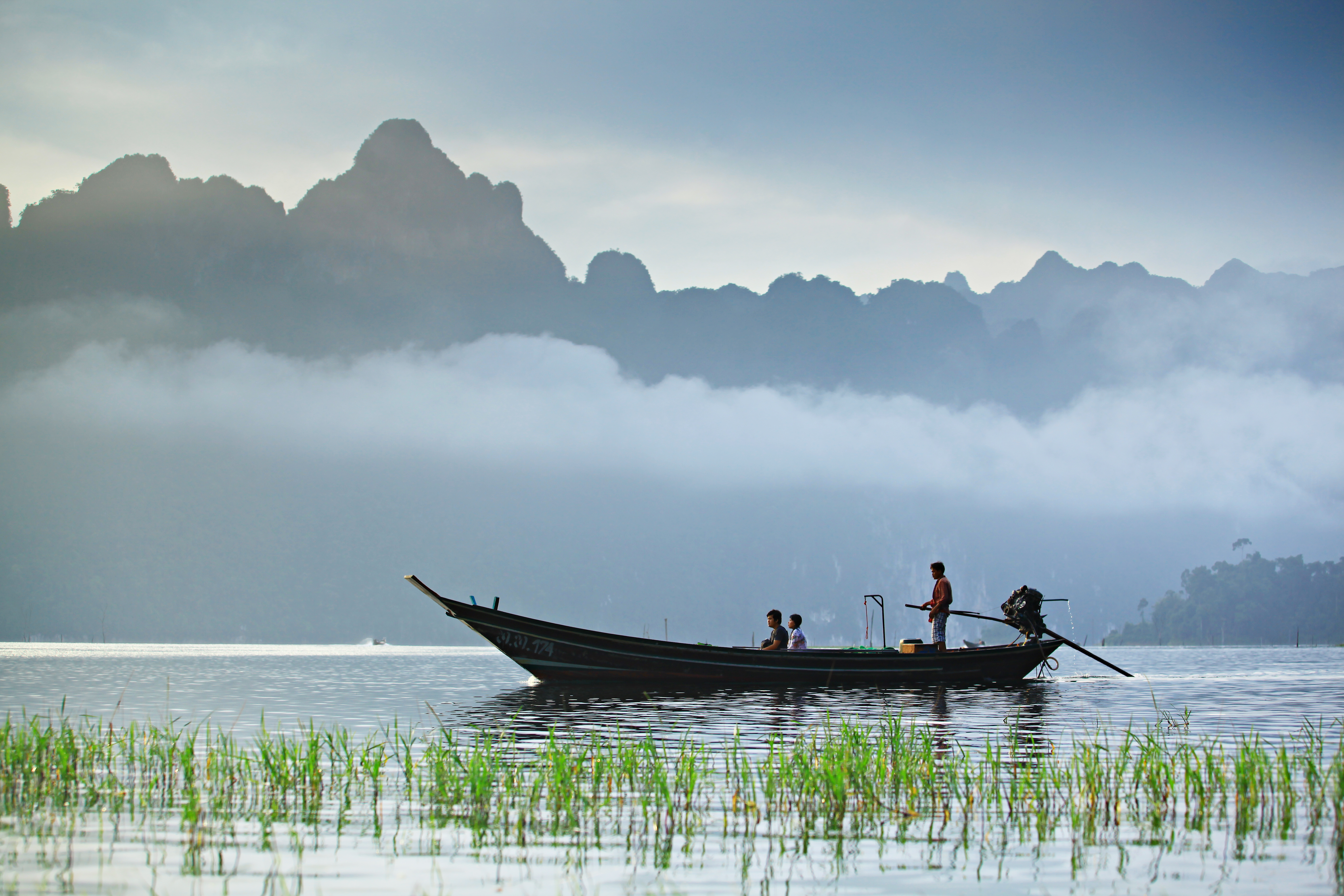
A boat in Cheow Lan Lake
