= Pani Dihing Wildlife Sanctuary =

Bird sanctuary in Assam, India

Pani-Dihing Bird Sanctuary
- IUCN category IV (habitat/species management area)
- Location within Assam Location within India
- Interactive map of Pani-Dihing Bird Sanctuary
- Location: Sivasagar district, Assam, India
- Nearest city: Sivasagar
- Coordinates: 27°7′19″N 94°35′47″E
- Area: 33.93 km^{2} (13.10 sq mi)
- Established: 1996; 30 years ago
- Governing body: Department of Environment & Forests, Assam

Pani-Dihing Bird sanctuary is a 33.93-square-kilometre (13.10 sq mi) bird sanctuary located in Sivasagar district, Assam. It is 22 km (14 mi) away from Sivasagar town. This protected area was established as a Bird Sanctuary in August 1996 by the Government of Assam. It was identified as a potential bird sanctuary in late 1980s. The first systematic ornithological surveys in the area was conducted by noted conservationist Dr Anwaruddin Choudhury in 1987–88. Pani-Dihing is a complex of grassland and wetland. Some of the wetlands including channels or beels include Tokia, Jarjaria, Boloma, Dighali, Singorajan, Sagunpora, Kandhulijan, Fulai and Gaiguma. A detailed background of Pani-Dihing has also been published. Pani-Dihing and adjacent areas is on the global map being an Important Bird & Biodiversity Area

== Climate ==
The climate of the area is tropical monsoon and annual temperature ranges between 7–38 °C (45–100 °F) annually. Annual rainfall is approximately 2400–3200 mm with a relative humidity of 65–85%.

== Rivers ==
The sanctuary is bordered by the Brahmaputra and the Disang rivers in the north west and south respectively.

== Fauna ==
As many as 267 species of birds including 70 species of migratory birds have been identified and recorded at Pani Dihing. Some notable birds seen here are bar-headed goose, greylag goose, Indian spot-billed duck, mallard, gadwall, wigeon, garganey, shoveller, red-crested pochard, common pochard, ferruginous duck, greater adjutant stork, lesser adjutant stork, open-bill stork, white-necked stork, glossy ibis, grey plover, Himalayan griffon and white-rumped vulture Assam's first record of bank myna was from Pani-Dihing. Among mammals, there were past records of great Indian one-horned rhinoceros and tiger. Wild elephants, hog deer, rhesus monkey and otters.

== Threats ==
Although an important birding area supporting a very large population of birds, Pani-Dihing has suffered on account of poaching, grazing of cattle and fishing within the sanctuary premises.

== See also ==
- Protected areas of Assam
