= East Karbi-Anglong Wildlife Sanctuary =

Wildlife sanctuary in Assam, India

- IUCN category IV (habitat/species management area)
- Interactive map of East Karbi-Anglong Wildlife Sanctuary
- Location: Karbi Anglong district, Assam, India
- Nearest city: Diphu
- Area: 221.81 km^{2} (85.64 sq mi)
- Established: 27 July 2000

The East Karbi Anglong Wildlife Sanctuary is located in the Assam state of India. It is situated 35 km from the city of Diphu, Karbi Anglong district. It covers an area of 221.81 km^{2}, and its elevation varies between 80 and 500 meter above sea level.

The forest area was declared a wildlife sanctuary on 27 July 2000 by the Assam State Government.

== Atmosphere ==
The annual rainfall is around 1800 millimeter and average temperature is around 34 °C and minimum of 6 °C.

== Flora and fauna ==
East Karbi Anglong Wildlife Sanctuary is a home to a great variety of wildlife, mammals and reptiles like tiger, elephant, bear, hoolock gibbon, leopard, clouded leopard, Indian pangolin, small Indian civet, pig-tailed macaque, leopard cat, sambar, barking deer, porcupine, mongoose, king cobra, monitor lizard, python and others. And around 250 bird species have been recorded till date some like, great hornbill, common green pigeon, lesser racket-tailed drongo, black hooded oriole etc.
