= Garampani Wildlife Sanctuary =

Wildlife sanctuary in India

- IUCN category IV (habitat/species management area)
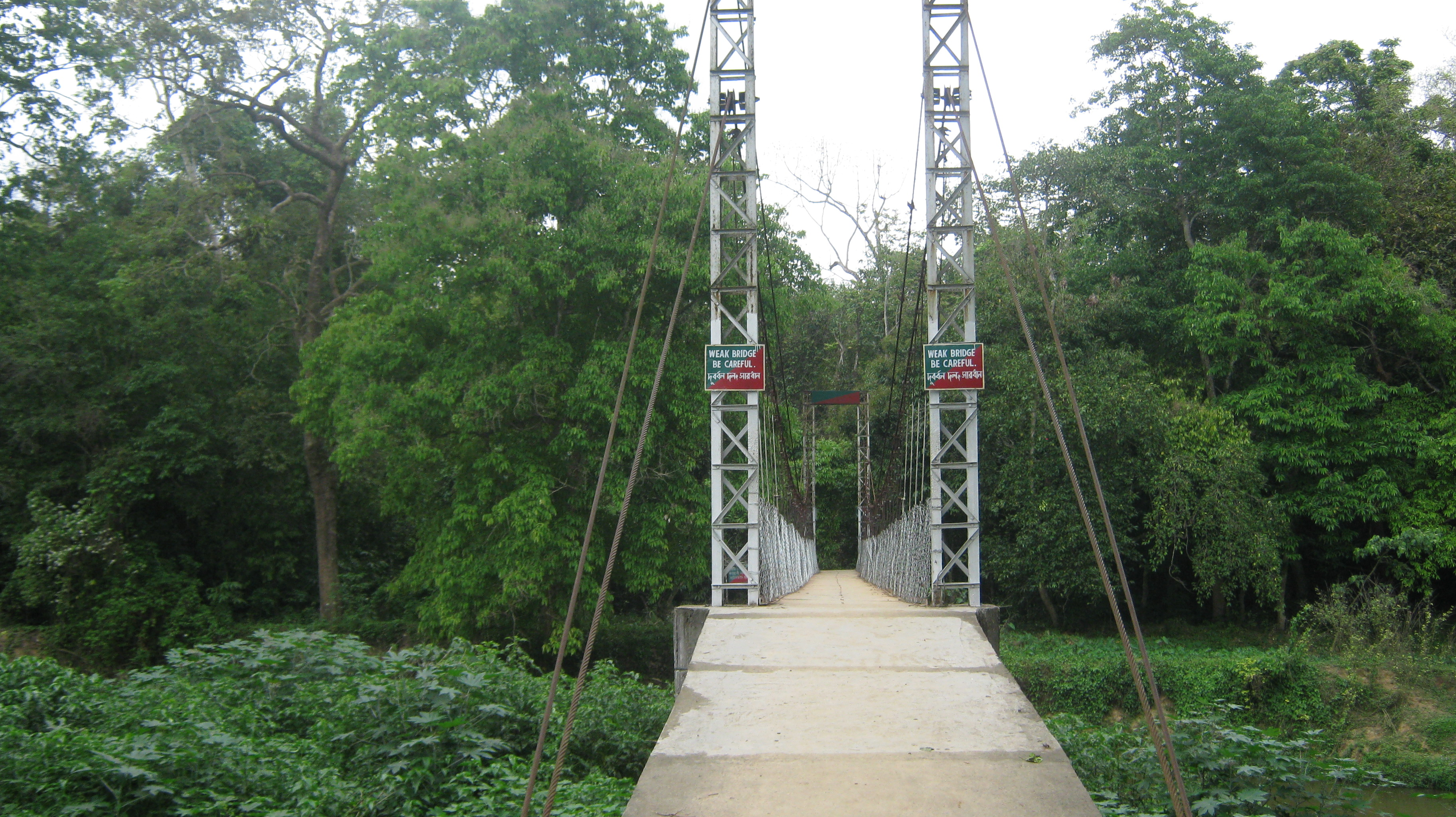
- Hanging bridge of Garampani Sanctuary

- Location within Assam Location within India
- Interactive map of Garampani Wildlife Sanctuary
- Location: Karbi Anglong district, Assam, India
- Nearest city: Golaghat
- Coordinates: 26.42°N 93.725°E
- Area: 6.05 km^{2} (2.34 sq mi)

Garampani Wildlife Sanctuary is a 6.05-square-kilometre (2.34 sq mi) wildlife sanctuary located in Karbi Anglong district, Assam, India. It was notified as a Wildlife Sanctuary in 1952 vide notification No, FR.199/52 dated 10/07/52.

It is 25 km (16 mi) from Golaghat. The nearest Airport is Dimapur which is 55 km away, and Jorhat Airport is 85 km away. The road distances from nearest towns: 35 km from Golaghat, 92 km from Diphu, 330 km from Guwahati and 45 km from Kaziranga.

It is one of the oldest sanctuaries containing hot water spring and waterfalls, and has a rich biodiversity. It is surrounded by Nambor Sanctuary having 51 rare species of orchid. Many rare birds can be seen here. It is home to hoolock gibbons and golden langurs.

The climate is tropical and the vegetation is mostly semi-evergreen and tropical.
