= Pig-tailed macaque =

The pig-tailed macaques are two macaque sister species. They appear similar and are best distinguished by their parapatric ranges:

- Northern pig-tailed macaque (Macaca leonina), inhabiting Bangladesh to Vietnam, south to northern Malaysia
- Southern pig-tailed macaque (Macaca nemestrina), also called beruk, inhabiting Northern Malaysia and southern Thailand to Borneo and western Indonesia
