= Khlong Yan Wildlife Sanctuary =

Wildlife sanctuary in Thailand

- เขตรักษาพันธุ์สัตว์ป่าคลองยัน
- IUCN category Ia (strict nature reserve)
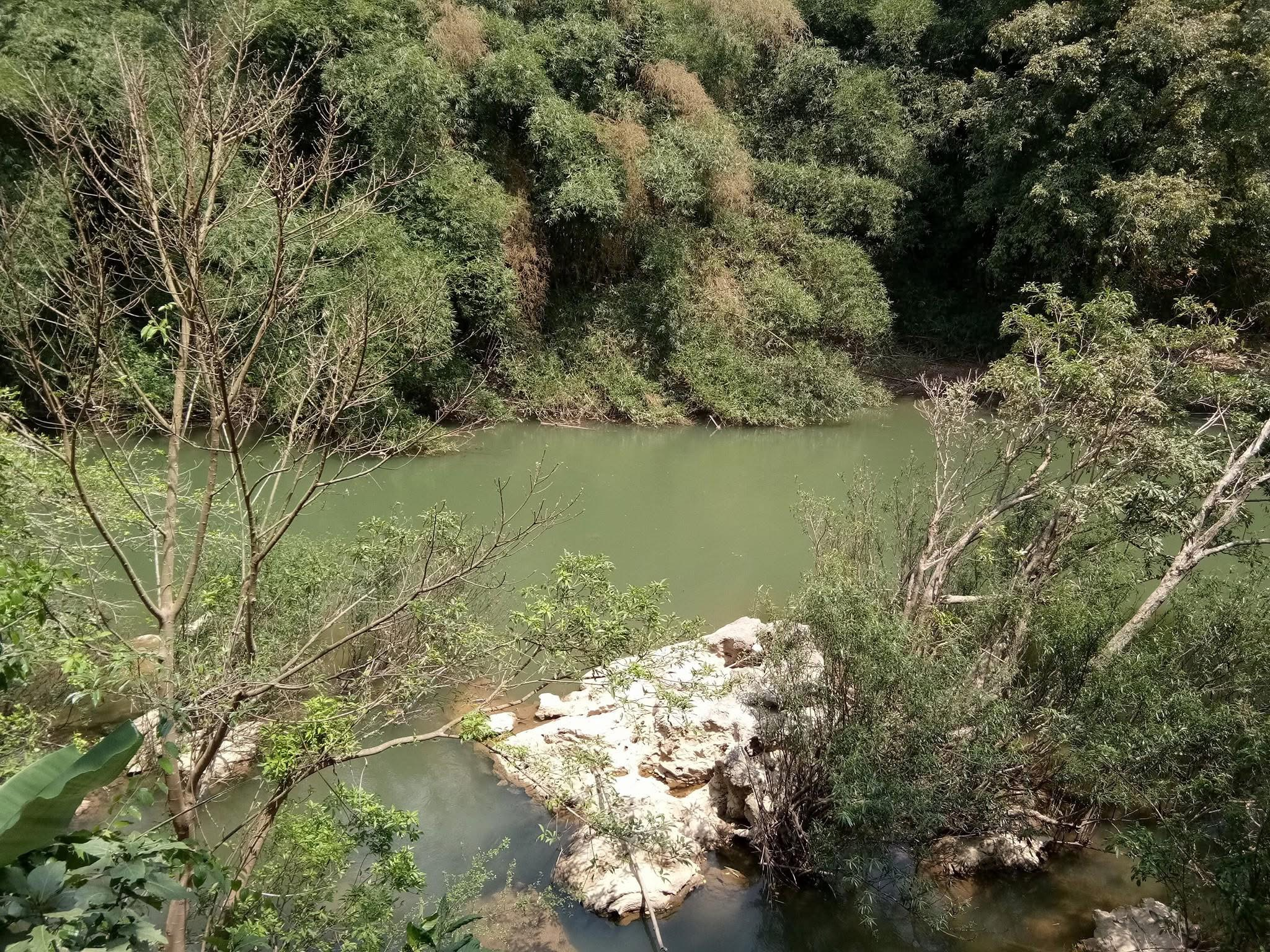
- Khlong Yan river

- Location within Thailand
- Location: Surat Thani Province, Thailand
- Nearest city: Surat Thani
- Coordinates: 9.148°N 98.82°E
- Area: 488 km^{2} (188 mi^{2})
- Established: 30 December 1992
- Governing body: Wildlife Conservation Office

Khlong Yan (Thai: คลองยัน) is a wildlife sanctuary in southern Thailand, located in the west of Surat Thani Province. It is located between the Khao Sok and Kaeng Krung National Park within the hills of the Phuket mountain range.

== Geography ==
It covers an area of 488 km^{2} (188 mi^{2}), covering area of the tambon Pak Chalui of Tha Chang district, Ta Kuk Tai and Ta Kuk Nuea of Vibhavadi, Nam Hak, Tha Khanon and Ka Pao of Khiri Rat Nikhom, and Khao Pang of Ban Ta Khun.

The wildlife sanctuary is named after the river (Khlong) Yan, a tributary of the Phum Duang River. The valley of the 70km long river marks the center of the wildlife sanctuary. The main attraction within the sanctuary is the Vibhavadi waterfall.

== Location ==
Khlong Yan Wildlife Sanctuary in overview PARO 4 (Surat Thani)

15) Khlong Yan Wildlife Sanctuary in overview PARO 4 (Surat Thani)

| | National park |
| 1 | Kaeng Krung |
| 2 | Khao Sok |
| 3 | Khlong Phanom |
| 4 | Laem Son |
| 5 | Lam Nam Kra Buri |
| 6 | Mu Ko Ang Thong |
| 7 | Mu Ko Chumphon |
| 8 | Mu Ko Ranong |
| 9 | Namtok Ngao |
| 10 | Tai Rom Yen |
| 11 | Than Sadet–Ko Pha-ngan |

| | Wildlife sanctuary |
| 12 | Khuan Mae Yai Mon |
| 13 | Khlong Nakha |
| 14 | Khlong Saeng |
| 15 | Khlong Yan |
| 16 | Prince Chumphon; North (lower) |
| 17 | Prince Chumphon; South |
| 18 | Thung Raya Na-Sak |

| | Non-hunting area |
| 19 | Khao Tha Phet |
| 20 | Nong Thung Thong |
| | Forest park |
| 21 | Namtok Kapo |

== See also ==
- DNP - Khlong Yan Wildlife Sanctuary
- PARO 4 (Surat Thani)
