= Khlong Saeng Wildlife Sanctuary =

Wildlife sanctuary in Thailand

- IUCN category Ia (strict nature reserve)
- Location within Thailand
- Location: Thailand
- Nearest city: Surat Thani
- Coordinates: 9°10′N 98°35′E
- Area: 1,155 km^{2} (446 sq mi)
- Established: 18 December 1974
- Governing body: Wildlife Conservation Office

Khlong Saeng (Thai: คลองแสง) is a wildlife sanctuary in southern Thailand, in western Surat Thani Province. The wildlife sanctuary is named after the river (khlong) Saeng, a tributary of the Phum Duang River.

== Geography ==
The sanctuary includes an area of 1,155 km^{2} of Khiri Rat Nikhom District and Ban Ta Khun District, north of Khao Sok National Park and Ratchaprapha Dam. Most lowland areas in the Khlong Saeng valley were flooded with the construction of the dam and the creation of Cheow Lan Reservoir.

== Fauna ==
This now flooded area was the only site in Thailand where Storm's stork (Ciconia stormi) was confirmed to breed in 1986. Khlong Saeng is believed to be the habitat of about 200 wild elephants and 400 gaur. The population of clouded leopards and Asian golden cats is thought to have increased. In 2019, cameras were installed in the sanctuary to take pictures of endangered and protected animals in a 750,000-rai area north of the Ratchaprapha Dam. Photos captured rare animals such as clouded leopards and Asian golden cats. Traces of other rare animals such as black tigers and leopards were also found.

== Location ==
Khlong Saeng Wildlife Sanctuary in overview PARO 4 (Surat Thani)

14) Khlong Saeng Wildlife Sanctuary in overview PARO 4 (Surat Thani)

	National park
1	Kaeng Krung
2	Khao Sok
3	Khlong Phanom
4	Laem Son
5	Lam Nam Kra Buri
6	Mu Ko Ang Thong
7	Mu Ko Chumphon
8	Mu Ko Ranong
9	Namtok Ngao
10	Tai Rom Yen
11	Than Sadet–Ko Pha-ngan

	Wildlife sanctuary
12	Khuan Mae Yai Mon
13	Khlong Nakha
14	Khlong Saeng
15	Khlong Yan
16	Prince Chumphon; North (lower)
17	Prince Chumphon; South
18	Thung Raya Na-Sak

	Non-hunting area
19	Khao Tha Phet
20	Nong Thung Thong
	Forest park
21	Namtok Kapo

== See also ==
- DNP - Khlong Saeng Wildlife Sanctuary
- PARO 4 (Surat Thani)
