= Kaeng Krung National Park =

National park in Thailand

- IUCN category II (national park)
- Location within Thailand
- Location: Surat Thani Province, Thailand
- Nearest city: Surat Thani
- Coordinates: 9°18′0″N 98°52′0″E
- Area: 541 km^{2} (209 sq mi)
- Established: 1991
- Visitors: 909 (in 2019)
- Governing body: Department of National Parks, Wildlife and Plant Conservation

Kaeng Krung National Park (Thai: แก่งกรุง) is a national park in southern Thailand, protecting 338,125 rai ~ 541 square kilometres (209 sq mi) of forests in the Phuket mountain range. It was declared a national park on 4 December 1991.

The park is in northwest Surat Thani Province, covering area of the districts Tha Chana, Chaiya, Tha Chang, and Vibhavadi. The area encompasses two mountain chains, with the highest elevation being Khao Sung at 849 meters. The northern part drains via the Khlong Sa toward the Lang Suan River, while the south drains via the Khlong Yan to the Phum Duang River.

The wildlife in the park includes elephants, bears, gaurs, tapirs, tigers, several monkey species, as well as many bird species.

== Location ==
Kaeng Krung National Park in overview PARO 4 (Surat Thani)

1) Kaeng Krung National Park in overview PARO 4 (Surat Thani)

	National park
1	Kaeng Krung
2	Khao Sok
3	Khlong Phanom
4	Laem Son
5	Lam Nam Kra Buri
6	Mu Ko Ang Thong
7	Mu Ko Chumphon
8	Mu Ko Ranong
9	Namtok Ngao
10	Tai Rom Yen
11	Than Sadet–Ko Pha-ngan

	Wildlife sanctuary
12	Khuan Mae Yai Mon
13	Khlong Nakha
14	Khlong Saeng
15	Khlong Yan
16	Prince Chumphon; North Park (lower)
17	Prince Chumphon; South Park
18	Thung Raya Na-Sak

	Non-hunting area
19	Khao Tha Phet
20	Nong Thung Thong
	Forest park
21	Namtok Kapo

== See also ==
- List of national parks of Thailand
- DNP - Kaeng Krung National Park
- List of Protected Areas Regional Offices of Thailand
