= Nong Thung Thong =

Coordinates: 8°50′29″N 99°13′30″E

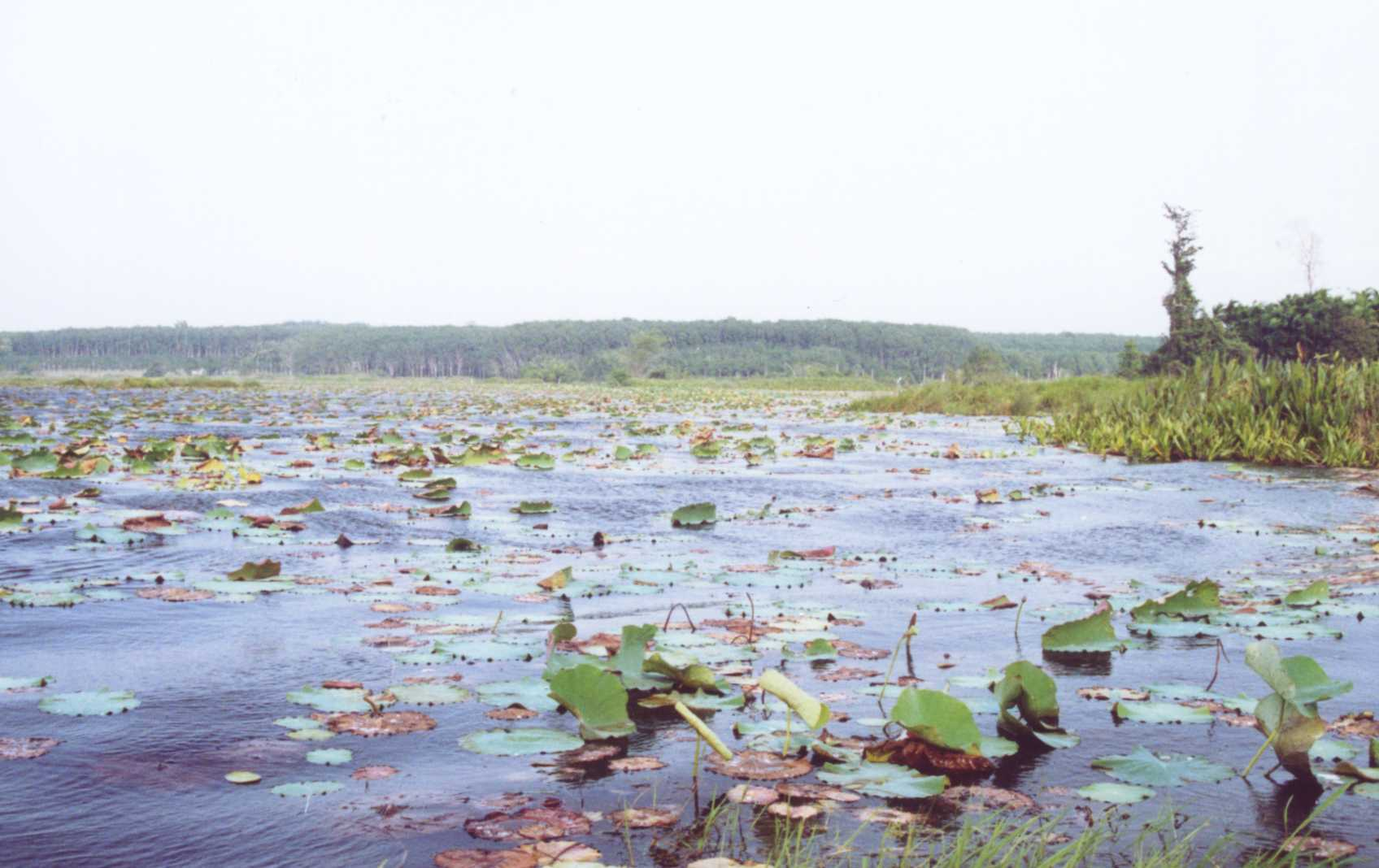
Lotus flowers in a reservoir of Nong Thung Thong

Nong Thung Thong (Thai: หนองทุ่งทอง) is a swamp on the east bank of the Tapi River in Khian Sa District, Surat Thani Province, southern Thailand.

The area, together with the Nong Tung Ka on the west bank of the river, forms a complex of grassland and swamps along the river. During the end of the southwest monsoon and during the northeast monsoon (October–December) the area is almost completely flooded, while at the end of the dry season (March) most of the area is dry.

In 1975 an area of 29.6 km^{2} was declared a non-hunting area. In 1989 it was enlarged to 64.5 km^{2}.

== Location ==
Nong Thung Thong Non-hunting Area in overview PARO 4 (Surat Thani)

20) Nong Thung Thong Non-hunting Area in overview PARO 4 (Surat Thani)

	National park
1	Kaeng Krung
2	Khao Sok
3	Khlong Phanom
4	Laem Son
5	Lam Nam Kra Buri
6	Mu Ko Ang Thong
7	Mu Ko Chumphon
8	Mu Ko Ranong
9	Namtok Ngao
10	Tai Rom Yen
11	Than Sadet–Ko Pha-ngan

	Wildlife sanctuary
12	Khuan Mae Yai Mon
13	Khlong Nakha
14	Khlong Saeng
15	Khlong Yan
16	Prince Chumphon; North (lower)
17	Prince Chumphon; South
18	Thung Raya Na-Sak

	Non-hunting area
19	Khao Tha Phet
20	Nong Thung Thong
	Forest park
21	Namtok Kapo

== See also ==
- DNP - Nong Thung Thong Non-hunting Area
- PARO 4 (Surat Thani)
