= Mu Ko Chumphon National Park =

National park in Thailand

- IUCN category II (national park)
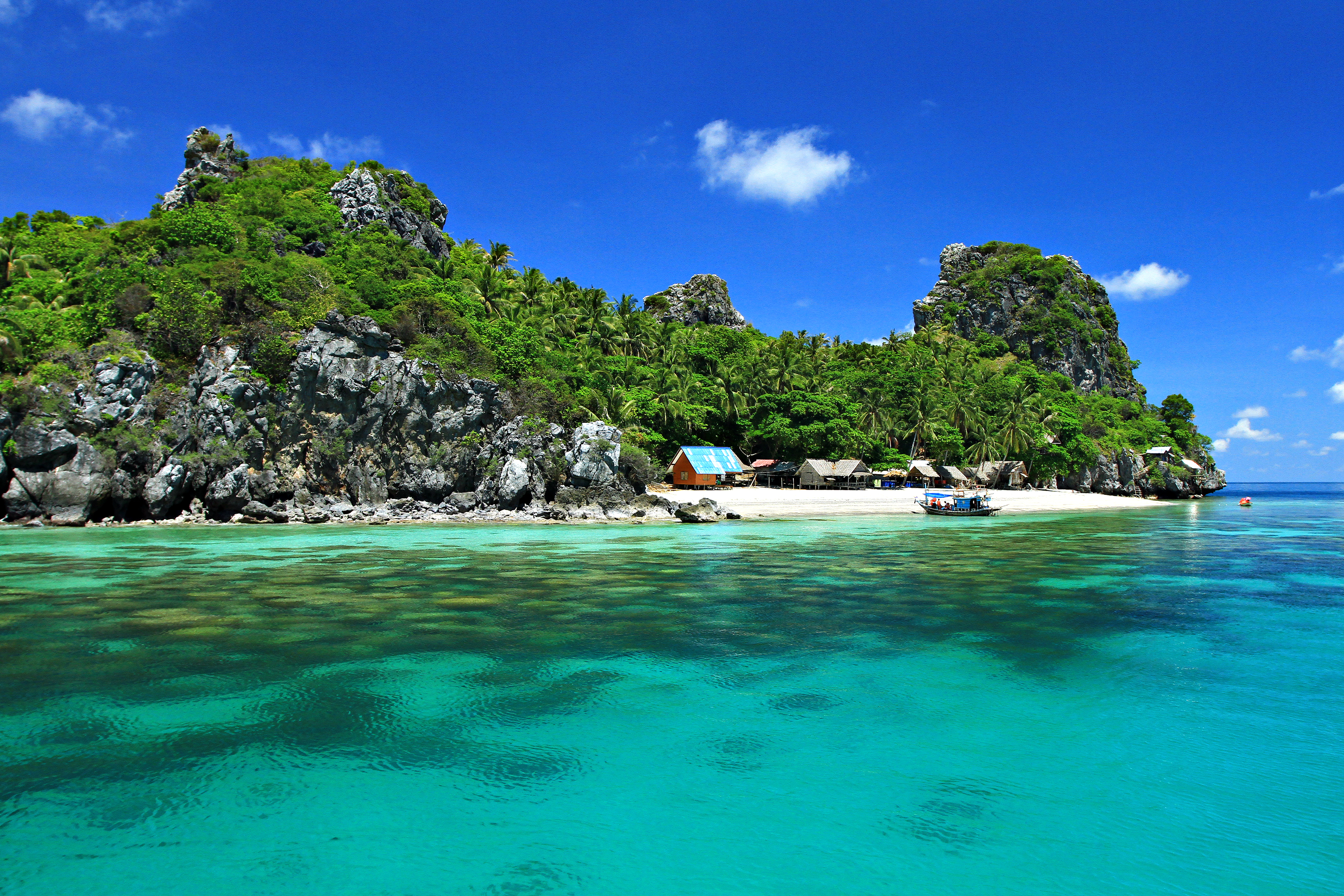

- Park location in Thailand
- Location: Thailand
- Nearest city: Chumphon
- Coordinates: 10°15′N 99°13′E
- Area: 324 km^{2} (125 sq mi)
- Established: 1999
- Governing body: Department of National Parks, Wildlife and Plant Conservation

Mu Ko Chumphon National Park (Thai: อุทยานแห่งชาติหมู่เกาะชุมพร, pronounced [mùː kɔ̀ʔ chùm.pʰɔ̄ːn]) is a national park of Thailand consisting of an archipelago in the Gulf of Thailand off the coast of, and part of, Chumphon Province, southern Thailand. Its old name was Had Sai Ree. It was renamed "Mu ko Chumphon" and established as a national park in 1999 by the forestry department. The area is 198,125 rai ~ 317 square kilometres (122 sq mi). Mu Ko Chumphon National Park has many types of natural resources. Its forests, mostly tropical rainforest, are a type found only on the mountain and on large islands. They provide shelter and habitats for many living things. The number of visitors was 52,919 for the year 2019.

The archipelago consists of various islands such as Hat Thung Makham and Hat Sai Ri in Amphoe Mueang, Hat Arunothai in Amphoe Thung Tako, and Hat Tong Khrok in Amphoe Lang Suan. There are nearly 40 islands which have long beaches, white sand, and clear water. There are also many colorful coral reefs which are attractive for swimming, snorkeling and scuba diving. Two of the islands are swiftlets' habitats, the birds' nests being used in birds' nest soup.

== Location ==
Mu Ko Chumphon National Park in overview PARO 4 (Surat Thani)

7) Mu Ko Chumphon National Park in overview PARO 4 (Surat Thani)

	National park
1	Kaeng Krung
2	Khao Sok
3	Khlong Phanom
4	Laem Son
5	Lam Nam Kra Buri
6	Mu Ko Ang Thong
7	Mu Ko Chumphon
8	Mu Ko Ranong
9	Namtok Ngao
10	Tai Rom Yen
11	Than Sadet–Ko Pha-ngan

	Wildlife sanctuary
12	Khuan Mae Yai Mon
13	Khlong Nakha
14	Khlong Saeng
15	Khlong Yan
16	Prince Chumphon; North Park (lower)
17	Prince Chumphon; South Park
18	Thung Raya Na-Sak

	Non-hunting area
19	Khao Tha Phet
20	Nong Thung Thong
	Forest park
21	Namtok Kapo

== See also ==
- List of national parks of Thailand
- DNP - Mu Ko Chumphon National Park
- List of Protected Areas Regional Offices of Thailand
