= Tai Romyen National Park =

National park in Thailand

- IUCN category II (national park)
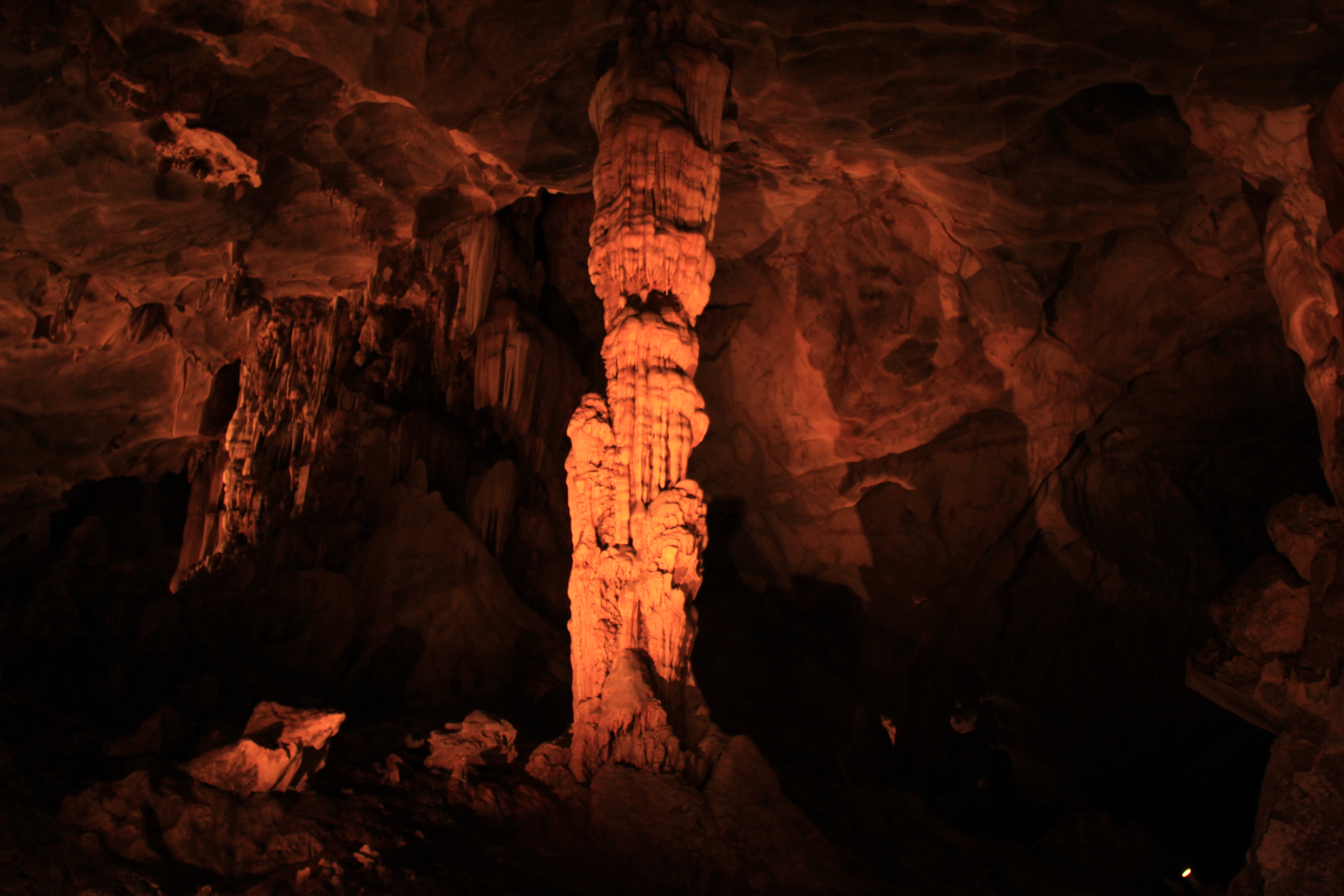
- Kamin Cave

- Location within Thailand
- Location: Surat Thani Province, Thailand
- Nearest city: Surat Thani
- Coordinates: 8°52′N 99°27′E
- Area: 425 km^{2} (164 sq mi)
- Established: 1991
- Visitors: 14,436 (in 2019)
- Governing body: Department of National Parks, Wildlife and Plant Conservation
- Website: Department of National Parks

Tai Romyen National Park (Thai: ใต้ร่มเย็น) is in the east of Surat Thani Province in southern Thailand. The park consists of the northern end of the Nakhon Si Thammarat mountain range and is mostly covered with forests. It was established on 31 December 1991 and covers an area of 265,625 rai ~ 425 square kilometres (164 sq mi) in the districts Kanchanadit, Ban Na San, and Wiang Sa.

The area, especially around the hill, Khao Chong Chang, was a stronghold of communist rebels in the 1980s. From here they succeeded in killing Princess Vibhavadi Rangsit in 1977 as well as the vice-governor of Surat Thani. When the rebellion ceased in the early–1990s due to an amnesty program called Tai Romyen (literally, "cool shade in the south") and it was again safe to visit the area, the national park was established. The park was then named after the amnesty program.

Attractions in the park are the two waterfalls Muang Thuat and Than Thip, as well as the Khamin Cave. Also two former camps of the communist party can be visited, named Camp 180 and Camp 357.

== Location ==
Tai Rom Yen National Park in overview PARO 4 (Surat Thani)

10) Tai Rom Yen National Park in overview PARO 4 (Surat Thani)

	National park
1	Keang Krung
2	Khao Sok
3	Khlong Phanom
4	Laem Son
5	Lam Nam Kra Buri
6	Mu Ko Ang Thong
7	Mu Ko Chumphon
8	Mu Ko Ranong
9	Namtok Ngao
10	Tai Rom Yen
11	Than Sadet–Ko Pha-ngan

	Wildlife sanctuary
12	Khuan Mae Yai Mon
13	Khlong Nakha
14	Khlong Saeng
15	Khlong Yan
16	Prince Chumphon; North Park (lower)
17	Prince Chumphon; South Park
18	Thung Raya Na-Sak

	Non-hunting area
19	Khao Tha Phet
20	Nong Thung Thong
	Forest park
21	Namtok Kapo

== See also ==
- List of national parks of Thailand
- DNP - Tai Rom Yen National Park
- List of Protected Areas Regional Offices of Thailand
