= Than Sadet–Ko Pha-ngan National Park =

National park of Thailand

- IUCN category II (national park)
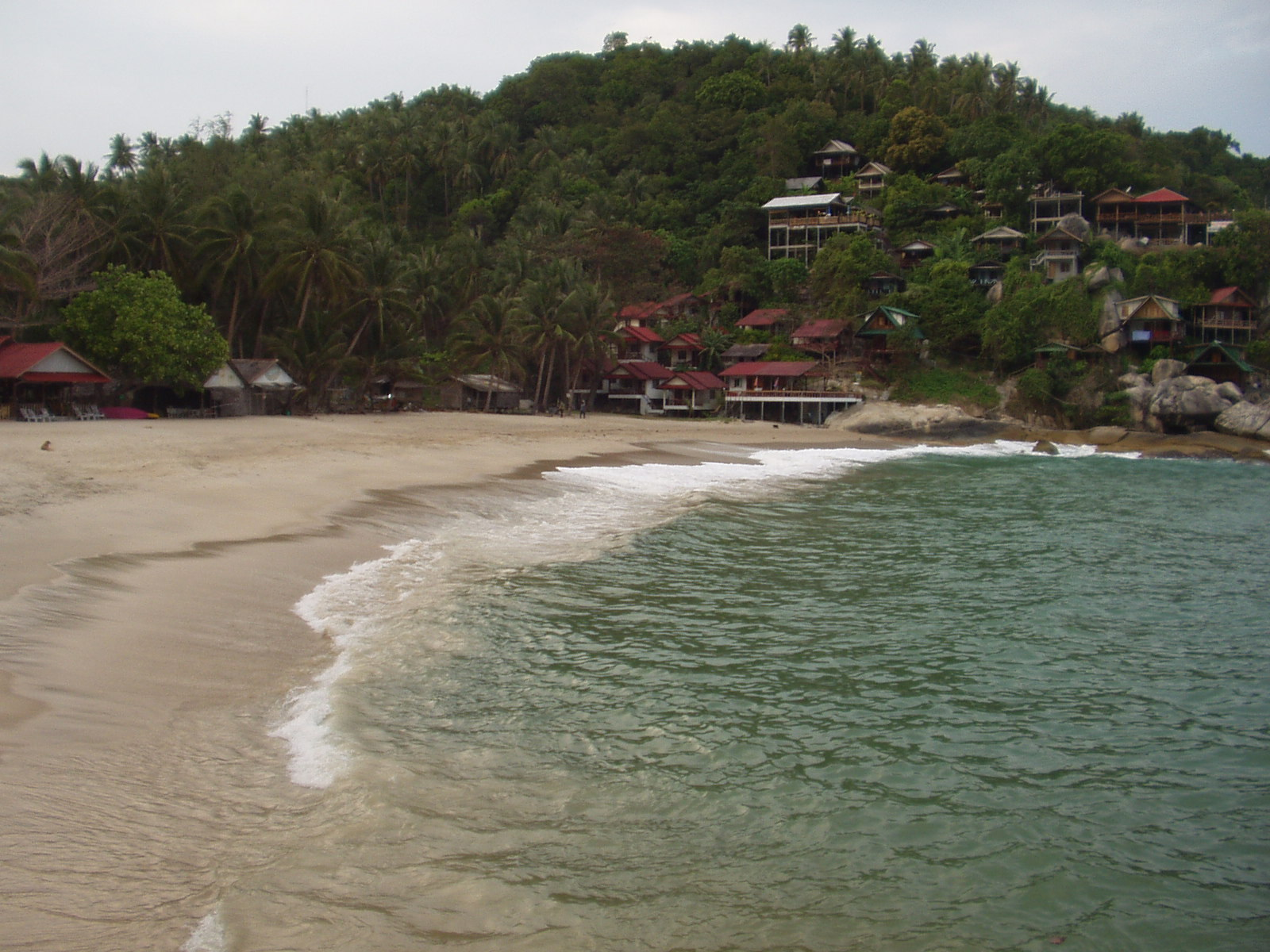
- Than Sadet Beach

- Location within Thailand
- Location: Surat Thani Province, Thailand
- Nearest city: Surat Thani
- Coordinates: 9°45′0″N 100°4′28″E
- Area: 43 km^{2} (17 sq mi)
- Established: November 2018
- Visitors: 158,090 (in 2019)
- Governing body: Department of National Parks, Wildlife and Plant Conservation

Than Sadet–Ko Pha-ngan (Thai: ธารเสด็จ-เกาะพะงัน) is a national park in southern Thailand, with an area of 26,866 rai ~ 43 km^{2} (17 sq mi) mostly on the island Pha-ngan. The park was established on 22 November 2018. It covers parts of the 65 km^{2} (25 sq mi) Ko Pha-ngan island.

The park is named after the royal visit of Rama V, Than Sadet (lit. Royal River) who came to the island to visit the waterfall first in 1888, then returned as many as fourteen times over the next 21 years. Rama V's initials can still be seen carved in a commemorative rock near the estuary of the river where the waterfall empties into the sea at Than Sadet Bay. The river itself forms a series of waterfalls and rock pools along its 2.5 km length, providing excellent trekking possibilities for the experienced. Several other Thai monarchs have visited the site including the late King Rama IX.

Khao Ra is both the highest elevation of the park as well as of the whole island of Pha-ngan, peaking at 635 m above sea level.

In addition to the forest on Pha-ngan itself, the park also includes several small islands north and east of Pha-ngan, including Wao and Hin Bai archipelago.

== Location ==
Than Sadet-Ko Pha-ngan National Park in overview PARO 4 (Surat Thani)

11) Than Sadet-Ko Pha-ngan National Park in overview PARO 4 (Surat Thani)

	National park
1	Keang Krung
2	Khao Sok
3	Khlong Phanom
4	Laem Son
5	Lam Nam Kra Buri
6	Mu Ko Ang Thong
7	Mu Ko Chumphon
8	Mu Ko Ranong
9	Namtok Ngao
10	Tai Rom Yen
11	Than Sadet–Ko Pha-ngan

	Wildlife sanctuary
12	Khuan Mae Yai Mon
13	Khlong Nakha
14	Khlong Saeng
15	Khlong Yan
16	Prince Chumphon; North Park (lower)
17	Prince Chumphon; South Park
18	Thung Raya Na-Sak

	Non-hunting area
19	Khao Tha Phet
20	Nong Thung Thong
	Forest park
21	Namtok Kapo

== See also ==
- List of national parks of Thailand
- DNP - Than Sadet-Ko Pha-ngan National Park
- List of Protected Areas Regional Offices of Thailand
