= Vibhavadi district =

Vibhavadi วิภาวดี
- District
- District location in Surat Thani province
- Coordinates: 9°14′20″N 98°58′44″E
- Country: Thailand
- Province: Surat Thani
- Subdistrict: 2
- Muban: 31
- District established: 1992

Area
  - Total: 543.5 km^{2} (209.8 sq mi)

Population (2017)
  - Total: 15,459
  - Density: 27.8/km^{2} (72/sq mi)
- Time zone: UTC+7 (ICT)
- Postal code: 84180
- Geocode: 8419

Vibhavadi (Thai: วิภาวดี, RTGS: Wiphawadi, pronounced [wí.pʰāː.wā.dīː]) is a district (amphoe) in the west of Surat Thani province, southern Thailand.

== Geography ==
Neighboring districts are (from north clockwise): Tha Chang, Phunphin, Khiri Rat Nikhom, and Ban Ta Khun.

The district is in the hills of the Phuket mountain range, with part of the district being protected in the Khlong Yan Wildlife Sanctuary and the Kaeng Krung National Park.

== History ==
The minor district (king amphoe) was created on 22 April 1992 by splitting off two tambons from Khiri Rat Nikhom district. It is named after Princess Vibhavadi Rangsit, who was killed in 1977 when rebels shot down her helicopter in eastern Surat Thani Province.

On 15 May 2007, all 81 minor districts including this one, were upgraded to full districts on 24 August.

== Temples ==
There are three Buddhist temples in the district, all of the Mahayana branch.

- Pho Noi (โพธิ์น้อย)
- Aran Ya Ram (อรัญญาราม)
- Vibhavadi Wana Ram (วิภาวดีวนาราม)

== Administration ==
=== Central administration ===
Vibhavadi is divided into two sub-districts (tambons), which are further subdivided into 31 administrative villages (mubans).

No.	Name	Thai	Villages	Pop.
1.	Takuk Tai	ตะกุกใต้	14	6,005
2.	Takuk Nuea	ตะกุกเหนือ	17	9,454

=== Local administration ===
There are two sub-district administrative organizations (SAO) in the district:

- Takuk Tai (Thai: องค์การบริหารส่วนตำบลตะกุกใต้) consisting of sub-district Takuk Tai.
- Takuk Nuea (Thai: องค์การบริหารส่วนตำบลตะกุกเหนือ) consisting of sub-district Takuk Nuea.
