= Khlong Phanom National Park =

National park in Thailand

- IUCN category II (national park)
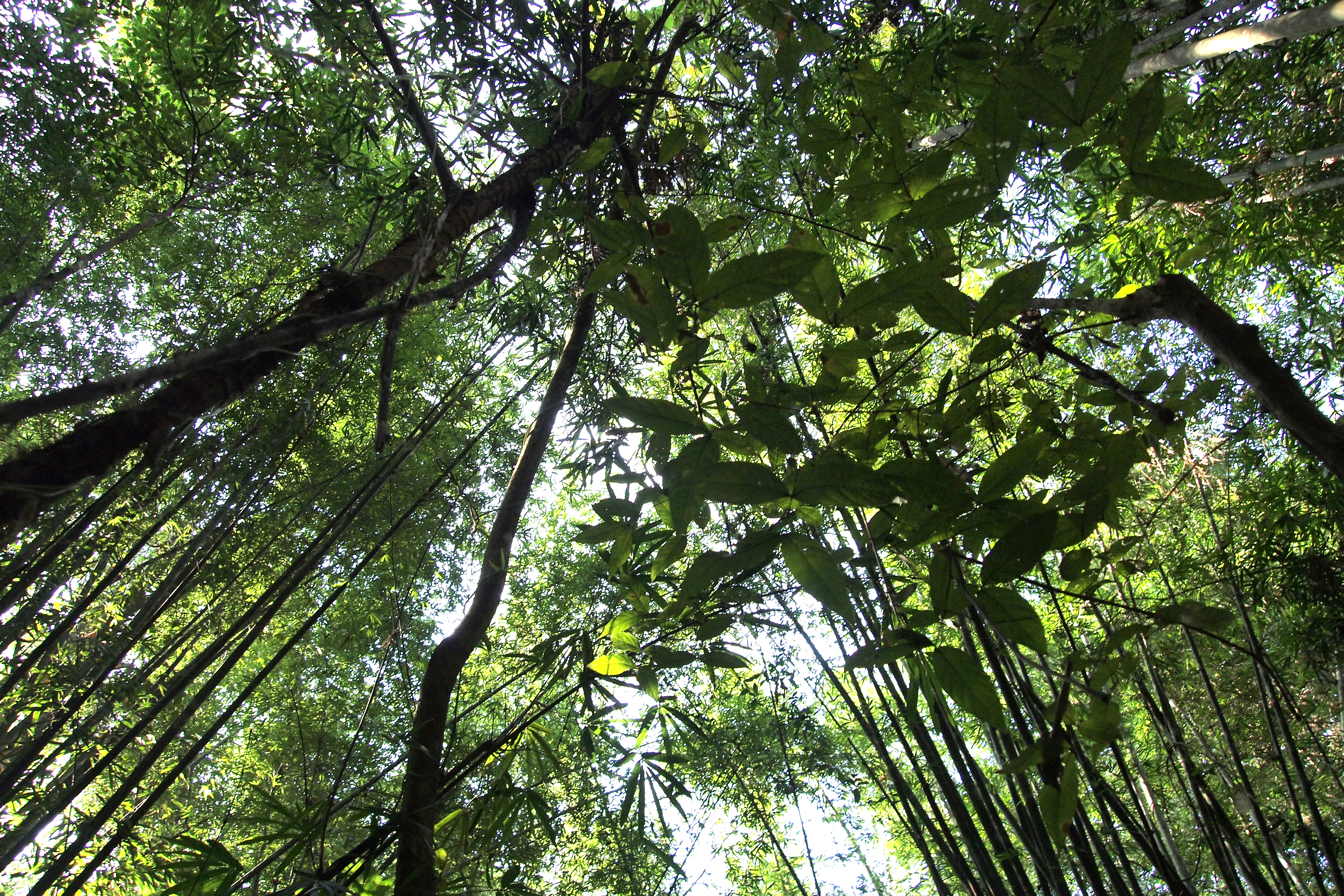
- Tropical forest in Khlong Phanom

- Location within Thailand
- Location: Surat Thani Province, Thailand
- Nearest city: Surat Thani
- Coordinates: 8°52′0″N 98°42′0″E
- Area: 410 km^{2} (160 sq mi)
- Established: 2000
- Visitors: 1,711 (in 2019)
- Governing body: Department of National Parks, Wildlife and Plant Conservation

Khlong Phanom (Thai: คลองพนม) is a national park in southern Thailand, protecting 256,500 rai ~ 410 square kilometres (160 sq mi) of forests within the Phuket mountain range. It was declared a national park on November 17, 2000.

The park is located in the southwest of Surat Thani Province, within the district Phanom. The park is continuous with the Khao Sok National Park to the north, separated by highway 401. To the southwest it is continued by the Tonpariwat Wildlife Sanctuary.

== Location ==
Khlong Phanom National Park in overview PARO 4 (Surat Thani)

3) Khlong Phanom National Park in overview PARO 4 (Surat Thani)

	National park
1	Keang Krung
2	Khao Sok
3	Khlong Phanom
4	Laem Son
5	Lam Nam Kra Buri
6	Mu Ko Ang Thong
7	Mu Ko Chumphon
8	Mu Ko Ranong
9	Namtok Ngao
10	Tai Rom Yen
11	Than Sadet–Ko Pha-ngan

	Wildlife sanctuary
12	Khuan Mae Yai Mon
13	Khlong Nakha
14	Khlong Saeng
15	Khlong Yan
16	Prince Chumphon; North Park (lower)
17	Prince Chumphon; South Park
18	Thung Raya Na-Sak

	Non-hunting area
19	Khao Tha Phet
20	Nong Thung Thong
	Forest park
21	Namtok Kapo

== See also ==
- List of national parks of Thailand
- DNP - Khlong Phanom National Park
- List of Protected Areas Regional Offices of Thailand
