= Laem Son National Park =

National park in Thailand

- IUCN category II (national park)
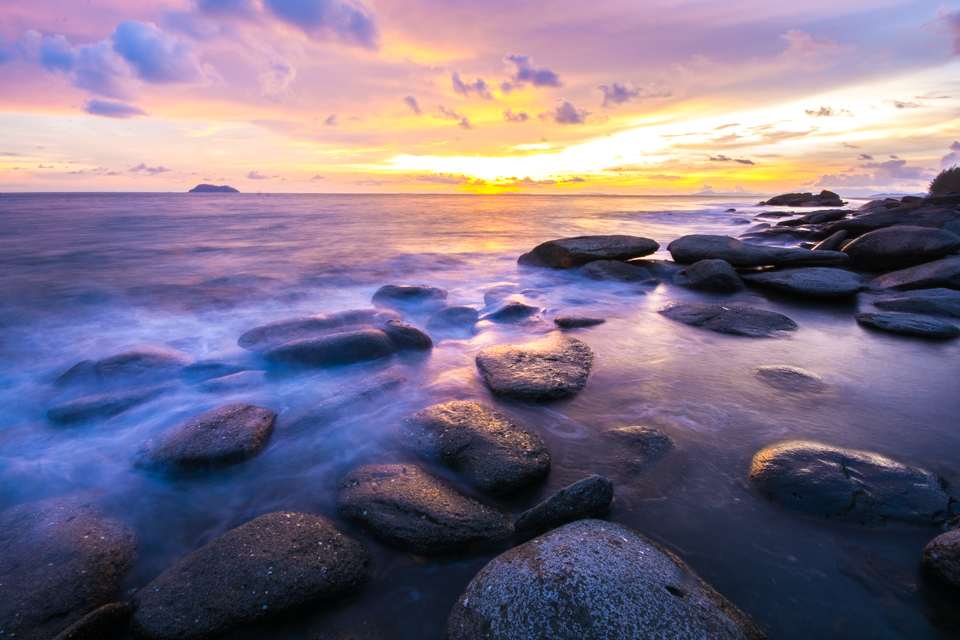

- Location within Thailand
- Location: Ranong and Phangnga provinces, Thailand
- Nearest city: Ranong
- Coordinates: 9.604°N 98.466°E
- Area: 315 km^{2} (122 sq mi)
- Established: 1983
- Visitors: 21,911 (in 2024)
- Governing body: Department of National Parks, Wildlife and Plant Conservation

Ramsar Wetland
- Official name: Kaper Estuary - Laemson Marine National Park - Kraburi Estuary
- Designated: 14 August 2002
- Reference no.: 1183

Laem Son National Park is located in Ranong and Phangnga provinces, Thailand. It is situated 60 kilometres (37 mi) south of Ranong on the country's west coast, with 100 kilometres (62 mi) of Andaman Sea coastline, making it Thailand's longest protected shore. The marine national park is named after the pines along the cape's shore. It was established in 1983, and is 196,875 rai ~ 315 square kilometres (122 sq mi) in size.

== Geography ==
The NP is a coastal area with beaches, coral reefs, mangrove swamps, and a rainforest jungle. From the beach at Hat Bang Ben, some of the 20 offshore islands are visible, such as Ko Kam Yai, Ko Kam Noi, Mu Ko Yipun, Ko Khangkhao, and Ko Phayam, while Ko Kam Tok (alternate Ko Ao Khao Khwai) and Ko Kam Yai are not visible from this beach. The islands of Piak Nam Yai and Thao are noted for stone-tool usage by long-tailed macaques. In 2002, the Laemson National Park-Kapoe Estuary-Kra Buri River Estuary area became a designated Ramsar site. Subsequent to the 2004 Indian Ocean earthquake and tsunami, the park headquarters were flattened, and Ao Khao Khwai (Bull Horn Bay) was split into two small islands. A consortium of institutional partners are facilitating a mangrove restoration project at Laem Son.

== Location ==
Laem Son National Park in overview PARO 4 (Surat Thani)

4) Laem Son National Park in overview PARO 4 (Surat Thani)

	National park
1	Kaeng Krung
2	Khao Sok
3	Khlong Phanom
4	Laem Son
5	Lam Nam Kra Buri
6	Mu Ko Ang Thong
7	Mu Ko Chumphon
8	Mu Ko Ranong
9	Namtok Ngao
10	Tai Rom Yen
11	Than Sadet–Ko Pha-ngan

	Wildlife sanctuary
12	Khuan Mae Yai Mon
13	Khlong Nakha
14	Khlong Saeng
15	Khlong Yan
16	Prince Chumphon; North Park (lower)
17	Prince Chumphon; South Park
18	Thung Raya Na-Sak

	Non-hunting area
19	Khao Tha Phet
20	Nong Thung Thong
	Forest park
21	Namtok Kapo

== Gallery ==
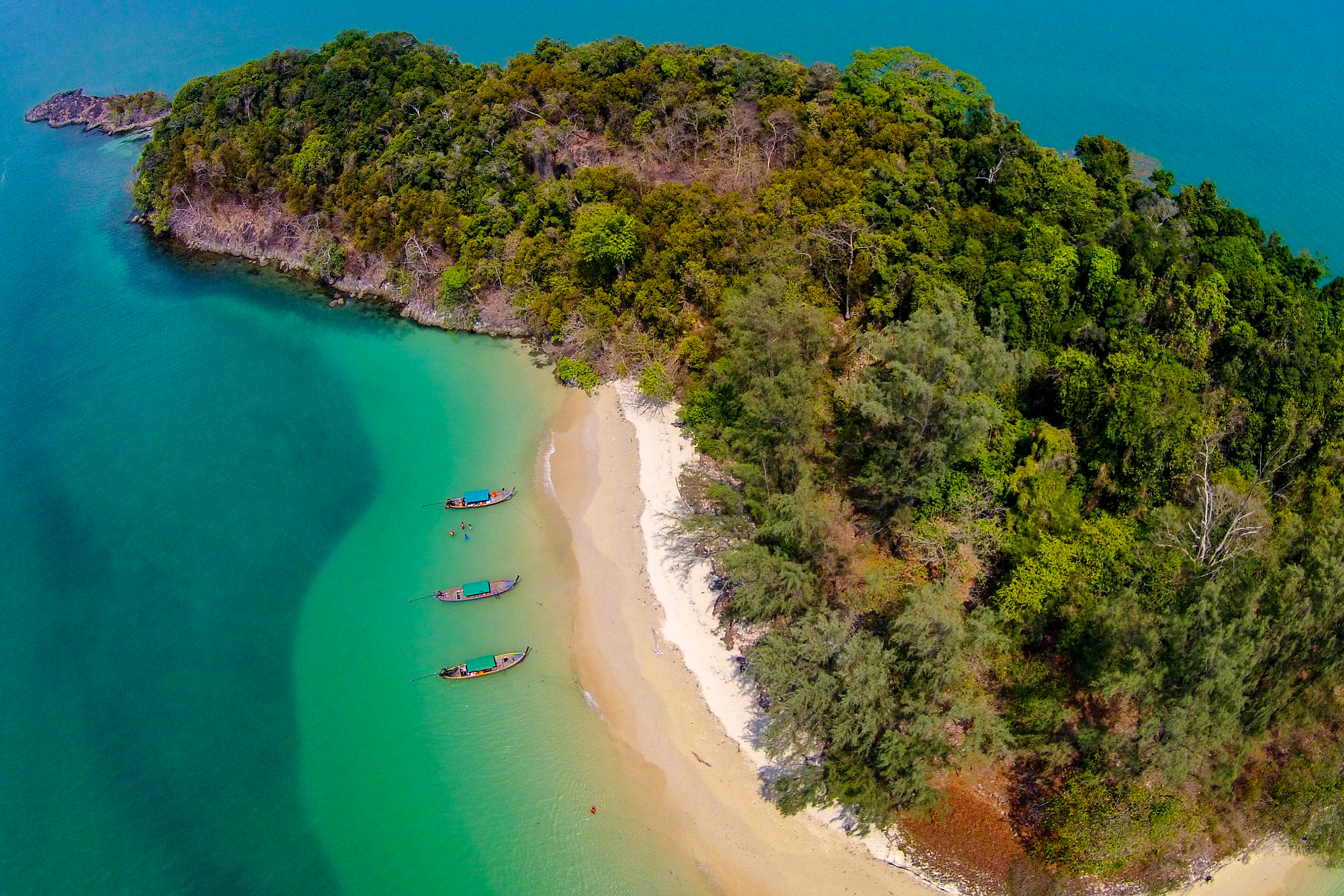
Laem Son National park

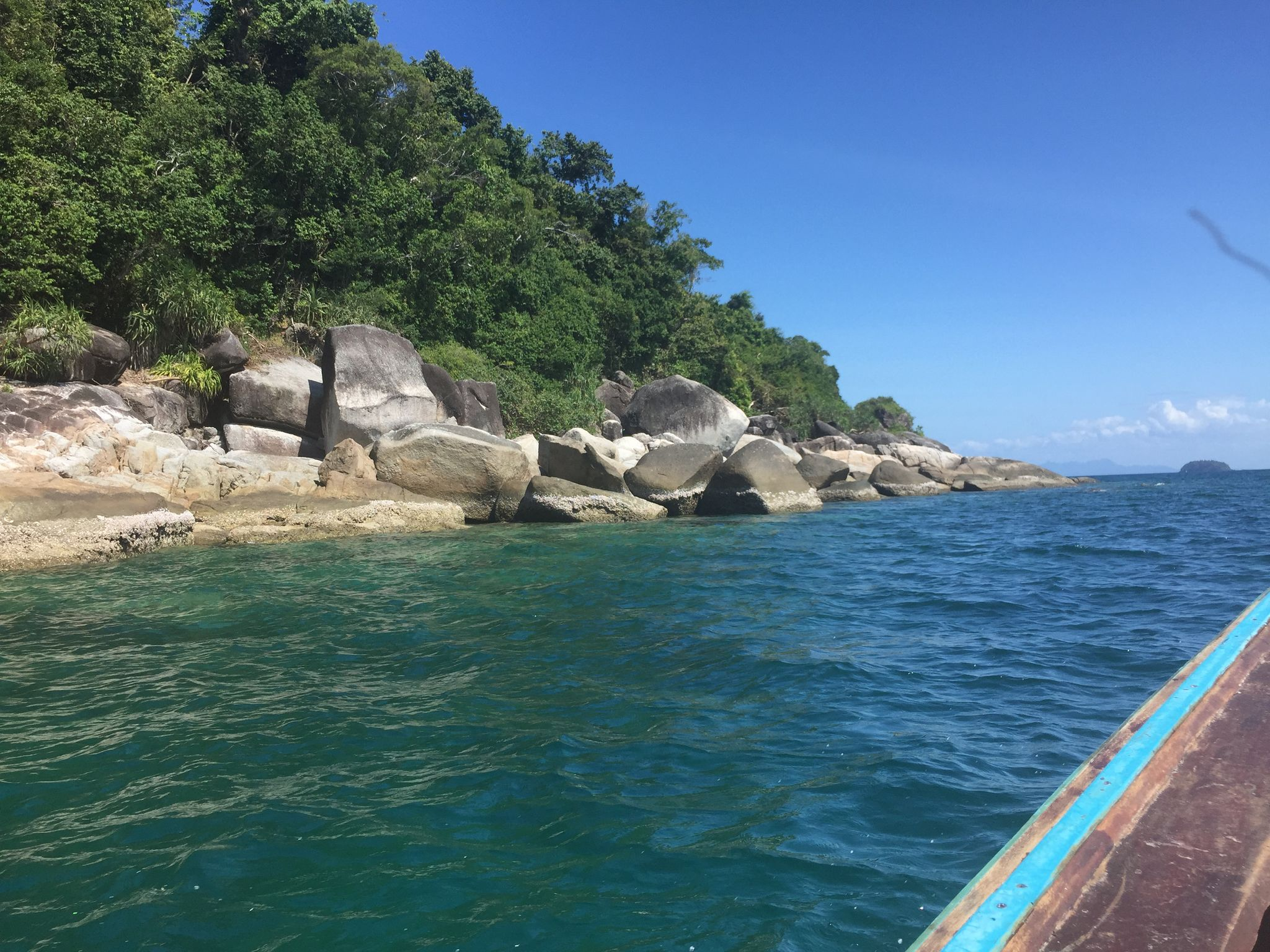
Cape Laem Son

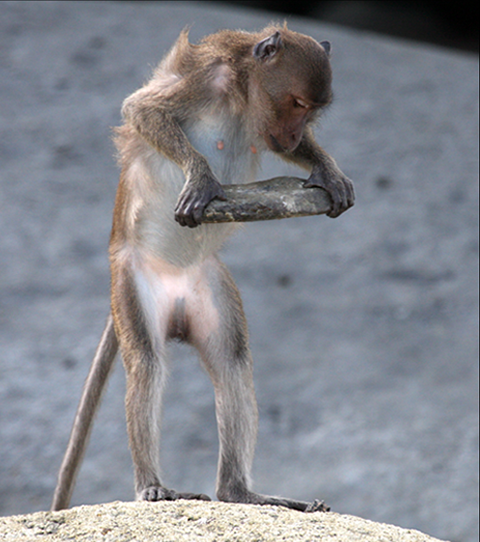
Crab-eating macaca

== See also ==
- List of national parks of Thailand
- DNP - Laem Son National Park
- List of Protected Areas Regional Offices of Thailand
