= Khao Tha Phet =

Non-hunting area in Surat Thani province, Thailand

- Location within Thailand

Highest point
- Elevation: 210 m (690 ft)
- Listing: List of mountains in Thailand
- Coordinates: 9°06′00″N 99°21′01″E

Geography
- Location: Surat Thani, Thailand

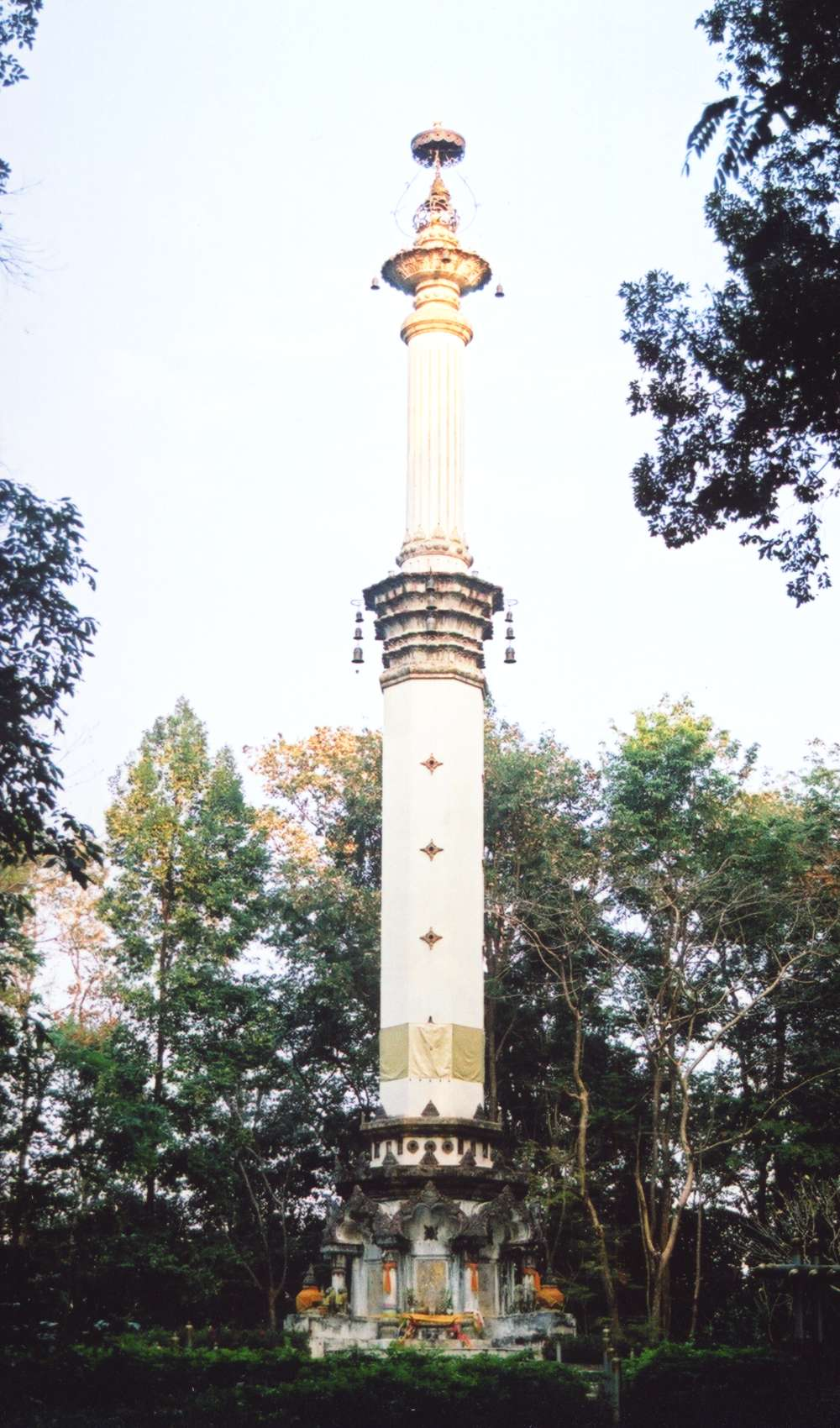
Sri Surat stupa

Khao Tha Phet (Thai: เขาท่าเพชร) is a hill near the city of Surat Thani in Southern Thailand.

== Geography ==
It is located in Makham Tia Subdistrict, Surat Thani City. The hill has an altitude of about 210 m (690 ft) above sea level and offers a good view over the city.

On top of the hill is the Si Surat stupa (also known by its common name Phra That Khao Tha Phet), a Srivijavan-style stupa built in 1957. The stupa contains a Buddha relic donated by India. Next to the stupa is a Sweet Shorea tree (Shorea roxburghii) planted by King Bhumibol Adulyadej.

Due to its height over the city, several TV and radio transmitters are located on the hill. A portion of the hill, around 4.65 km² (1.86 sq. miles) in size, was designated a protected non-hunting area on July 26, 1977.

== Location ==
Khao Tha Phet Non-hunting Area in overview PARO 4 (Surat Thani)

19) Khao Tha Phet Non-hunting Area in overview PARO 4 (Surat Thani)

	National park
1	Kaeng Krung
2	Khao Sok
3	Khlong Phanom
4	Laem Son
5	Lam Nam Kra Buri
6	Mu Ko Ang Thong
7	Mu Ko Chumphon
8	Mu Ko Ranong
9	Namtok Ngao
10	Tai Rom Yen
11	Than Sadet–Ko Pha-ngan

	Wildlife sanctuary
12	Khuan Mae Yai Mon
13	Khlong Nakha
14	Khlong Saeng
15	Khlong Yan
16	Prince Chumphon; North (lower)
17	Prince Chumphon; South
18	Thung Raya Na-Sak

	Non-hunting area
19	Khao Tha Phet
20	Nong Thung Thong
	Forest park
21	Namtok Kapo

== See also ==
- DNP - Khao Tha Phet Non-hunting Area
- PARO 4 (Surat Thani)
- List of mountains in Thailand
