= Mu Ko Ang Thong National Park =

Marine protected area in Surat Thani Province of Thailand

- IUCN category II (national park)
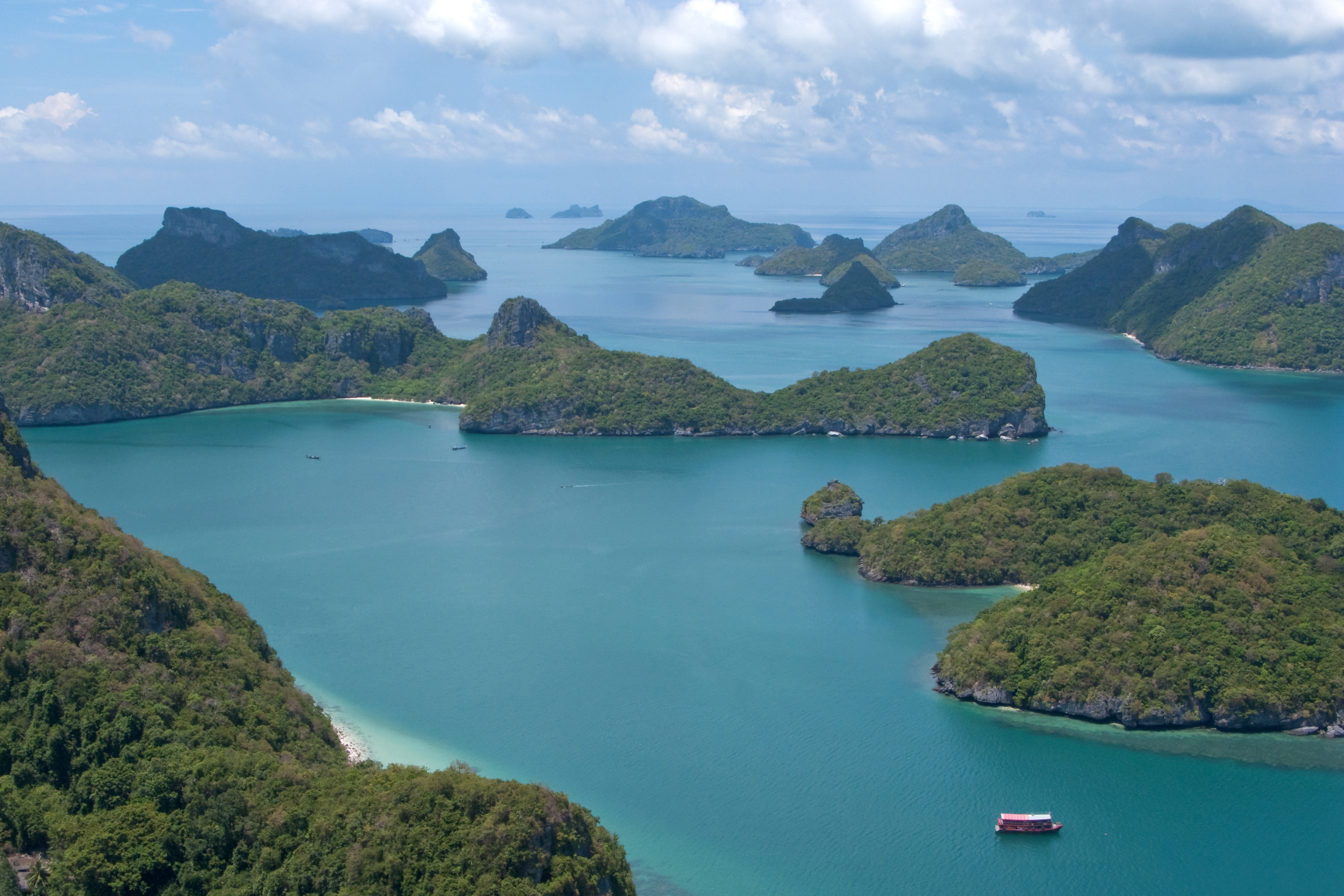
- Ang Thong National Park from Ko Wua Talap

- Location within Thailand
- Location: Surat Thani Province, Thailand
- Nearest city: Surat Thani
- Coordinates: 9°37′22″N 99°40′30″E
- Area: 102 km^{2} (39 sq mi)
- Established: 12 November 1980
- Visitors: 134,315 (in 2019)
- Governing body: Department of National Parks, Wildlife and Plant Conservation

Ramsar Wetland
- Designated: 14 August 2002
- Reference no.: 1184

Mu Ko Ang Thong is a marine national park in the Gulf of Thailand in Surat Thani Province. It covers 42 islands in a total area of 63,750 rai ~ 102 square kilometres (39 sq mi), of which about 50 square kilometres (19 sq mi) are land and the rest is water. The park was established on 12 November 1980. The northern tip of Ko Phaluai is also part of the marine park. There is a ranger station, bungalows, a shop, and a restaurant at Ao Phi Beach on Ko Wua Talap.

The name "Ang Thong" (Thai: อ่างทอง) means 'bowl of gold'. "Mu Ko" (หมู่เกาะ) simply means 'group of islands'.

Since 2002 the park has been registered as Ramsar site number 1184.

== History ==
Mu Ko Ang Thong National Park was established in 1980 as a marine national park in Surat Thani Province, Thailand.The park comprises an archipelago of 42 islands, covering a total area of approximately 102 square kilometres in the Gulf of Thailand, east of Ko Samui.It is designated as a Ramsar site under the Ramsar Convention, recognizing its importance as a wetland of international significance.

The name “Ang Thong,” meaning “golden basin,” is the correct spelling, although it is sometimes incorrectly written as “Angthong.”

The park gained wider international recognition following the popularity of The Beach, a novel by Alex Garland, and its film adaptation. The film contributed to increased interest in Thailand’s island destinations among international tourists.

== Topography ==
Mu Ko Ang Thong is a national park located in shallow water near the shore. The average water depth is about 10 m (33 ft).

== Geography and Climate ==
The islands of Mu Ko Ang Thong National Park occupy approximately 18 square kilometres of the total park area. Major islands include Ko Phaluai, Ko Wua Ta Lap, Ko Mae Ko, Ko Sam Sao, Ko Hin Dap, Ko Nai Phut, and Ko Phai Luak.The highest elevation is 396 metres above sea level on Ko Phaluai.The landscape is characterized by steep limestone formations, caves, sinkholes, and inland marine lakes.

Most islands are uninhabited, with the exception of small communities on Ko Wua Ta Lap and Ko Phaluai. The park headquarters and basic visitor facilities are located on Ko Wua Ta Lap.

Mu Ko Ang Thong National Park is situated in close proximity to several prominent tourist destinations, including Ko Samui, Ko Pha Ngan, Ko Tao, and Krabi, which are located at varying distances from the park.

The park experiences a tropical monsoon climate, making it suitable for tourism throughout the year.

From January to March, conditions are relatively dry and cooler, with temperatures ranging from 24°C to 30°C.

Between April and June, temperatures range from 28°C to 34°C during the hot season, with generally calm seas.

The monsoon season occurs from July to October, bringing increased rainfall and occasional rough sea conditions, with temperatures between 25°C and 32°C.

From November to December, conditions improve as the monsoon recedes, with temperatures ranging from 24°C to 31°C.

== Administration ==
Mu Ko Ang Thong National Park is an archipelago located in the Gulf of Thailand, within Ang Thong Subdistrict, Ko Samui District, Surat Thani Province.

In addition to the standard entrance fee, visitors may be required to obtain permits for certain activities such as kayaking, snorkeling, or hiking. These permits can typically be arranged in advance through tour operators or purchased on-site.Visitors are advised to confirm all applicable fees and requirements prior to their visit.

Entrance Fees

Visitors are required to pay an entrance fee, which varies by nationality and age, generally ranging from 25 to 300 Thai Baht. Additional charges may apply for boat access, typically between 100 and 300 Thai Baht depending on the type of vessel.

== Transport ==
As a protected national park, access to Mu Ko Ang Thong is restricted to authorized tour operators. The park is located approximately 28 kilometres from Ko Samui and 32 kilometres from Ko Pha Ngan.

== Islands ==
Nr	Island	Capital	Other Cities	Area (km²)	Population
1	Ko Chueak	Ko Chueak		1.62	0
2	Ko Nok Taphao	Ko Nok Taphao	Ao Kruat, Ao Pla, Ao Uttra,	3.32	200
3	Ko Phaluai	Ban Ao Sam	Ban Ao Song, Ban Ao Nueng, Ao nathap, Ao Luek	19.1	500
4	Ko Raet	Ko Raet		0.07	50
5	Ko Samsao	Ko Samsao		0.85	0
6	Ko Wua Chio	Ko Wua Chio		0.26	2
7	Ko Wua Talap	Ang Thong Station	Ao Phi	6.06	10
8	More Islands			10	0
Total:	Mu Ko Ang Thong	Ban Ao Sam	Ko Nok Taphao	40	692

== In popular culture ==
Mu Ko Ang Thong National Park has gained international attention through its association with The Beach, a novel by Alex Garland, and its film adaptation. Although the primary filming locations were elsewhere in Thailand, the scenery of Ang Thong is often linked to the tropical island imagery popularized by the story.

The park’s limestone landscapes, beaches, and lagoons have also contributed to its recognition in travel media and tourism-related publications.

== Gallery ==
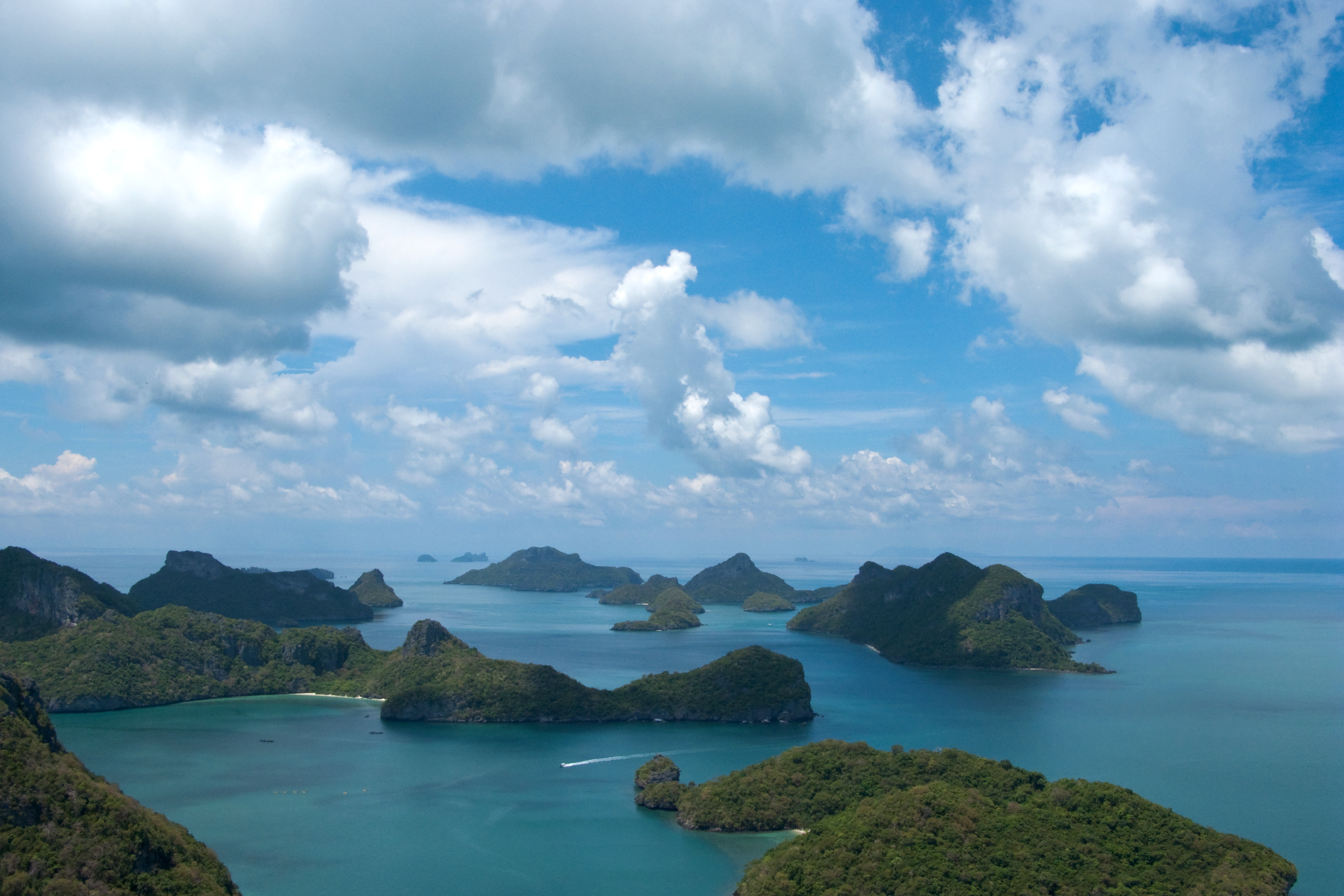
Ang Thong National Park from Ko Wua Talab

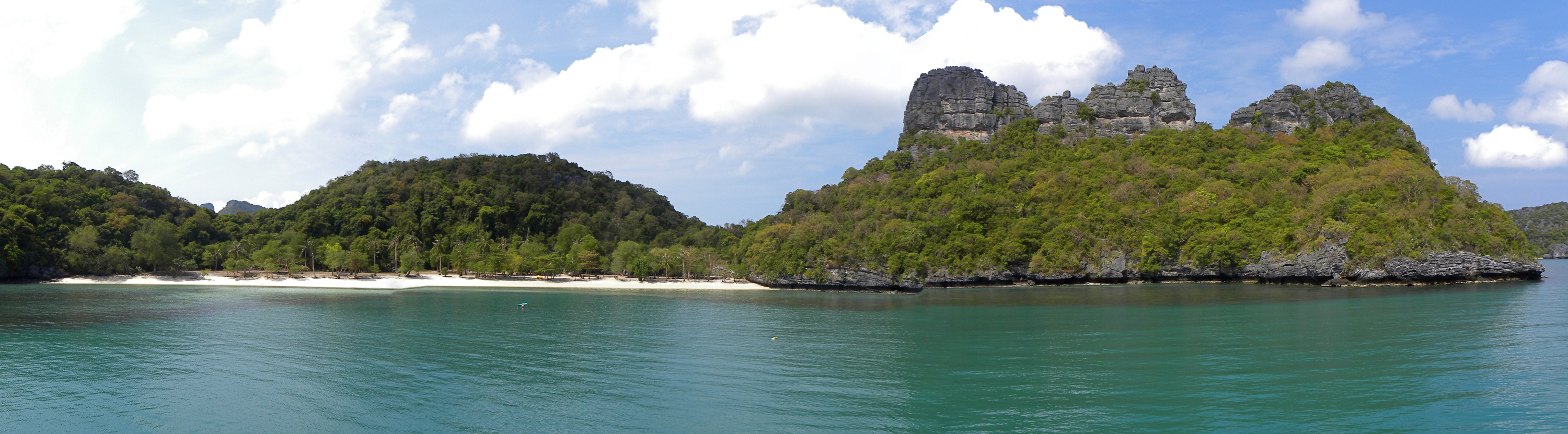
Beach, Ko Mae Ko

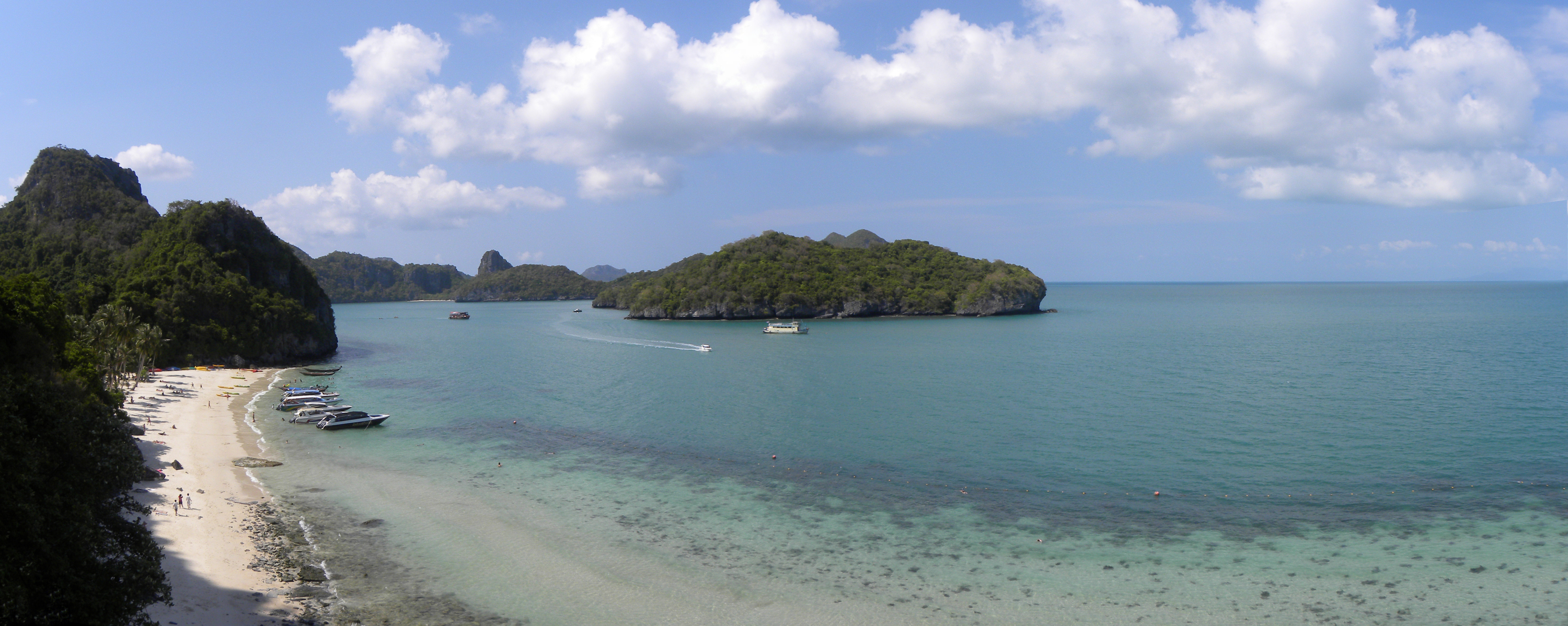
Beach, Ko Wua Talab

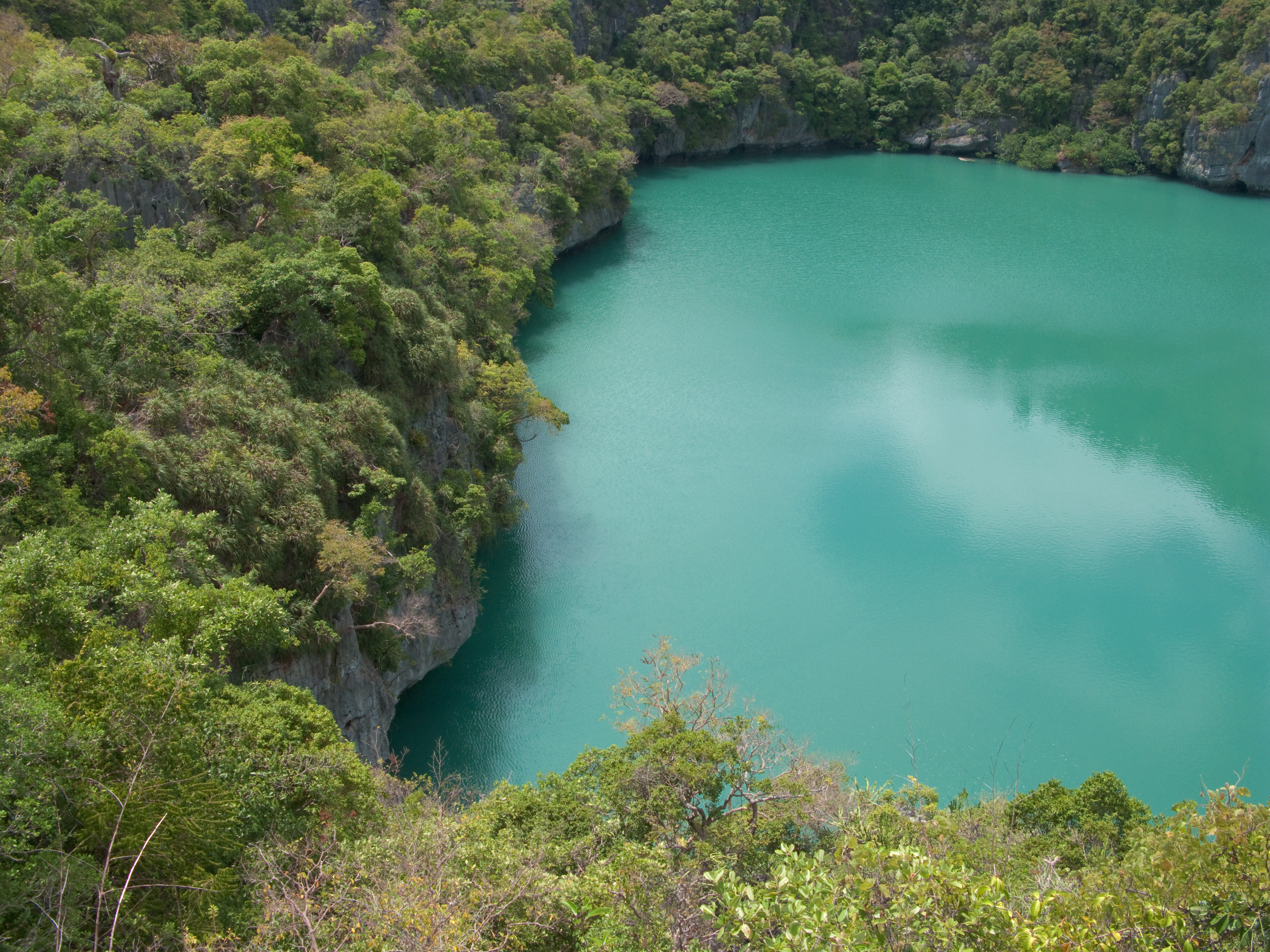
Laguna, Ko Mae Ko

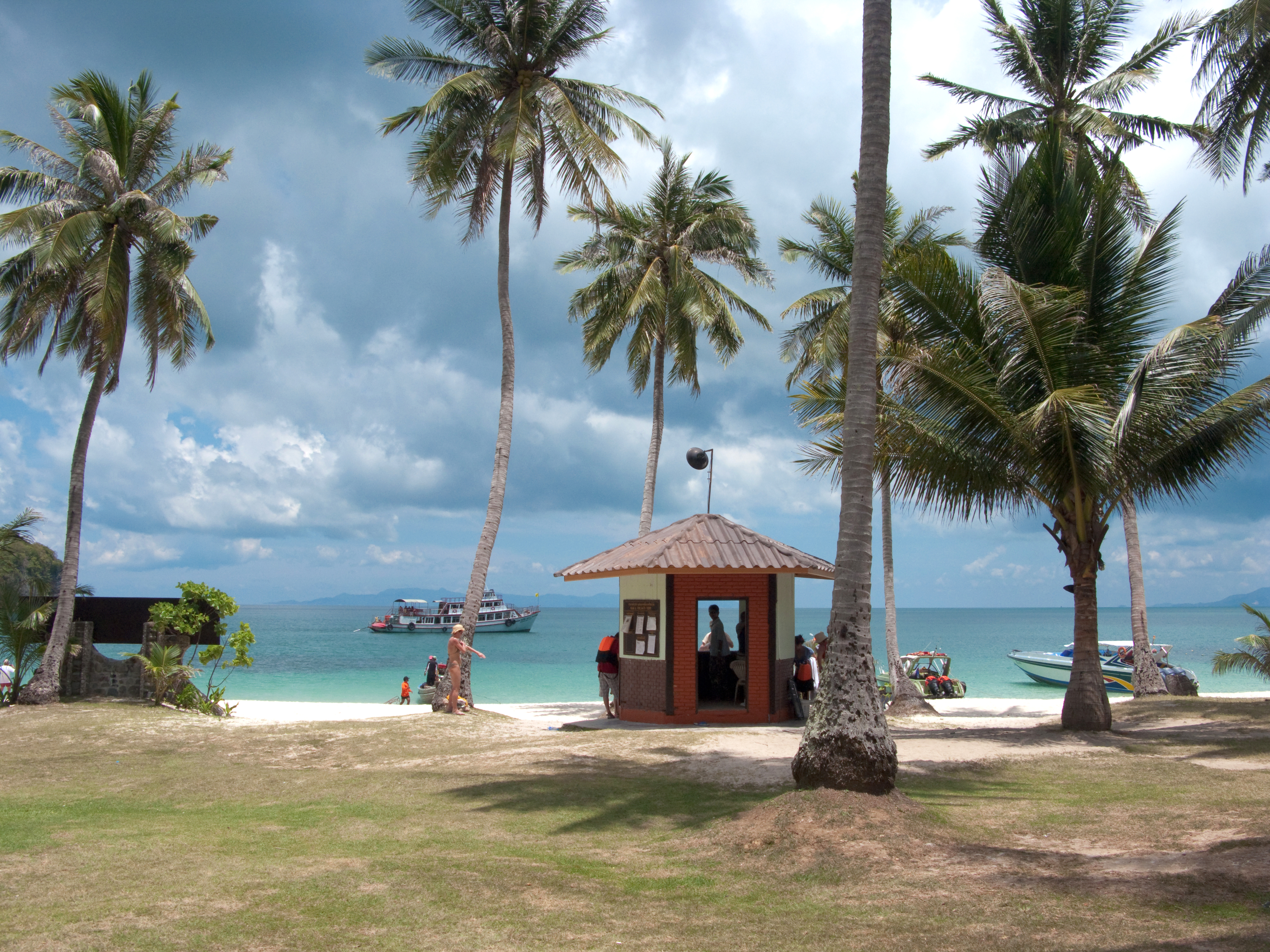
Ranger station

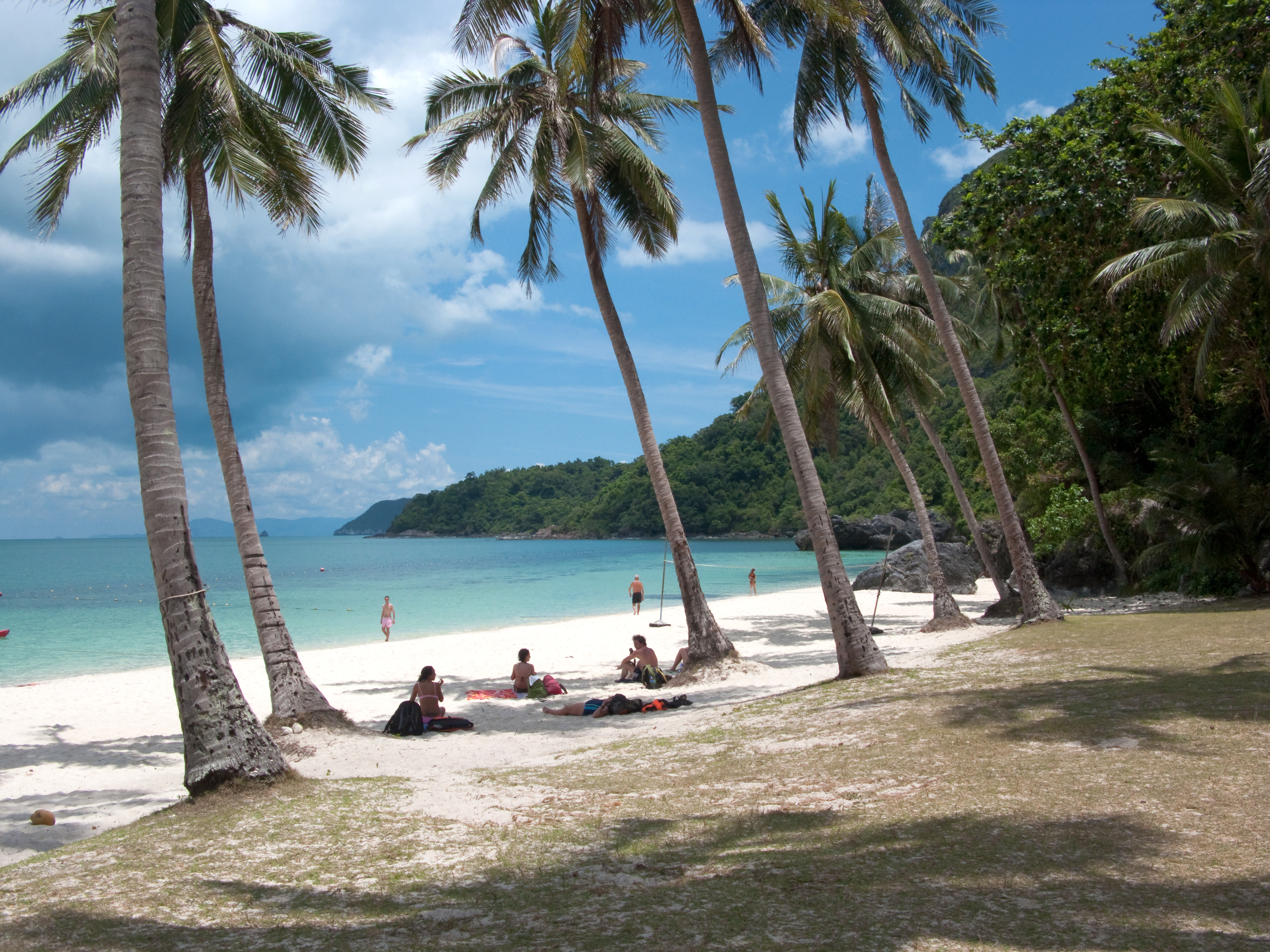
Beach

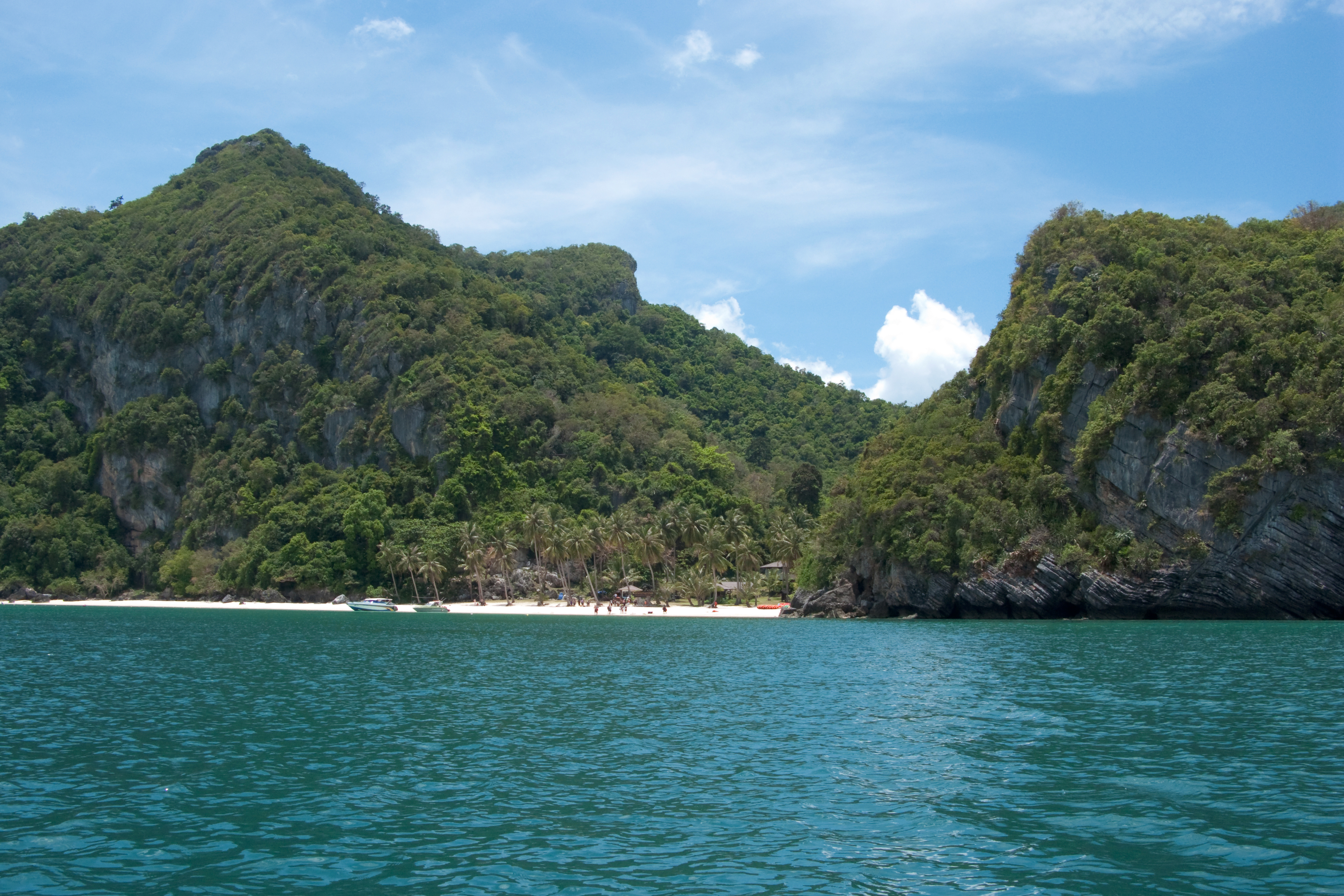
Ko Wua Talab

== Location ==
Mu Ko Ang Thong National Park in overview PARO 4 (Surat Thani)

6) Mu Ko Ang Thong National Park in overview PARO 4 (Surat Thani)

	National park
1	Keang Krung
2	Khao Sok
3	Khlong Phanom
4	Laem Son
5	Lam Nam Kra Buri
6	Mu Ko Ang Thong
7	Mu Ko Chumphon
8	Mu Ko Ranong
9	Namtok Ngao
10	Tai Rom Yen
11	Than Sadet–Ko Pha-ngan

	Wildlife sanctuary
12	Khuan Mae Yai Mon
13	Khlong Nakha
14	Khlong Saeng
15	Khlong Yan
16	Prince Chumphon; North Park (lower)
17	Prince Chumphon; South Park
18	Thung Raya Na-Sak

	Non-hunting area
19	Khao Tha Phet
20	Nong Thung Thong
	Forest park
21	Namtok Kapo

== See also ==
- List of national parks of Thailand
- DNP - Mu Ko Ang Thong National Park
- List of Protected Areas Regional Offices of Thailand
