= Khlong Nakha Wildlife Sanctuary =

Wildlife sanctuary in southern Thailand

- IUCN category IV (habitat/species management area)
- Location within Thailand
- Location: Thailand
- Nearest city: Ranong
- Coordinates: 9°26′N 98°35′E
- Area: 530.3296 km^{2} (204.7614 sq mi)
- Established: 26 May 1972
- Governing body: Wildlife Conservation Office

Khlong Nakha (Thai: คลองนาคา) is a wildlife sanctuary in southern Thailand, located in the southeast of Ranong Province. It is located within the hills of the Phuket mountain range.

== Geography ==
It covers an area of 530 km^{2}, covering area of the tambon Chiao Liang, Ban Na and Bang Hin of Kapoe district, Nakha and Kam Phuan of Suk Samran, as well as tambon Khao Pang of Ban Ta Khun of Surat Thani Province.

== History ==
The wildlife reserve was established in 1972, originally covering an area of 480 km^{2}. In 1991 50 km^{2} of tambon Khao Pang were added to the reserve.

== Location ==
Khlong Nakha Wildlife Sanctuary in overview PARO 4 (Surat Thani)

13) Khlong Nakha Wildlife Sanctuary in overview PARO 4 (Surat Thani)

	National park
1	Kaeng Krung
2	Khao Sok
3	Khlong Phanom
4	Laem Son
5	Lam Nam Kra Buri
6	Mu Ko Ang Thong
7	Mu Ko Chumphon
8	Mu Ko Ranong
9	Namtok Ngao
10	Tai Rom Yen
11	Than Sadet–Ko Pha-ngan

	Wildlife sanctuary
12	Khuan Mae Yai Mon
13	Khlong Nakha
14	Khlong Saeng
15	Khlong Yan
16	Prince Chumphon; North (lower)
17	Prince Chumphon; South
18	Thung Raya Na-Sak

	Non-hunting area
19	Khao Tha Phet
20	Nong Thung Thong
	Forest park
21	Namtok Kapo

== See also ==
- DNP - Khlong Nakha Wildlife Sanctuary
- PARO 4 (Surat Thani)

== Sources ==
- Forestry department (Thai only)
- Royal Gazette entries for Khlong Nakha:
  - Issue 89, Part 82 (May 26 1975)
  - Issue 108, Part 162 (September 16 1991)
