= Ko Khangkhao =

Coordinates: 13°6′57.15″N 100°48′31.08″E

Ko Khangkhao (Thai: เกาะค้างคาว, pronounced [kɔʔ kʰaːŋ kʰaːw]), also called Ko Taikhang khao, is an islet about 500 meters south of Ko Sichang, Chonburi, Thailand. It can be reached by boat from Ko Sichang or Ko Loi from Sri Racha. Ko Khangkhao has two beaches: East Beach, with some small reefs that make walking difficult, and West Beach. It is surrounded by coral reefs. The islet has a resort, and tents may also be set up.

== History ==
In the past, Ko Khangkhao was called Ko Taikhang khao, but travelers who visit it now are most familiar with the name "Ko Khankhao".

== Activities ==
Ko Khangkhao is part of the Laem Son National Park along with Koh Kam, Koh Cam Tok, and Koh Yipun. Collectively, the park covers and area of 315 km^{2}. The islet is situated around 9 km from the national park's office on Bang Ben beach. Ko Khangkhao is regarded as the finest islet of Kam Island.

Recreational activities on the islet include fishing, sailing, diving, and snorkeling.

In 2019, the Naturist Association Thailand rented a part of the islet in August 2019 for its nude beach trips.

== Climate ==
The average temperature is from 30.5 °C to 35.5 °C.

- Summer - from February to May
- Monsoon - from May to October
- Winter - from October to February

The statistics from the Department of Meteorology, Ko Khang khao has an average rainfall of 1148.8mm throughout the year.

== Demographics ==
Some citizens on this islet still raise yams, bananas, capsicums and cucumbers.
