= List of mountains in Thailand =

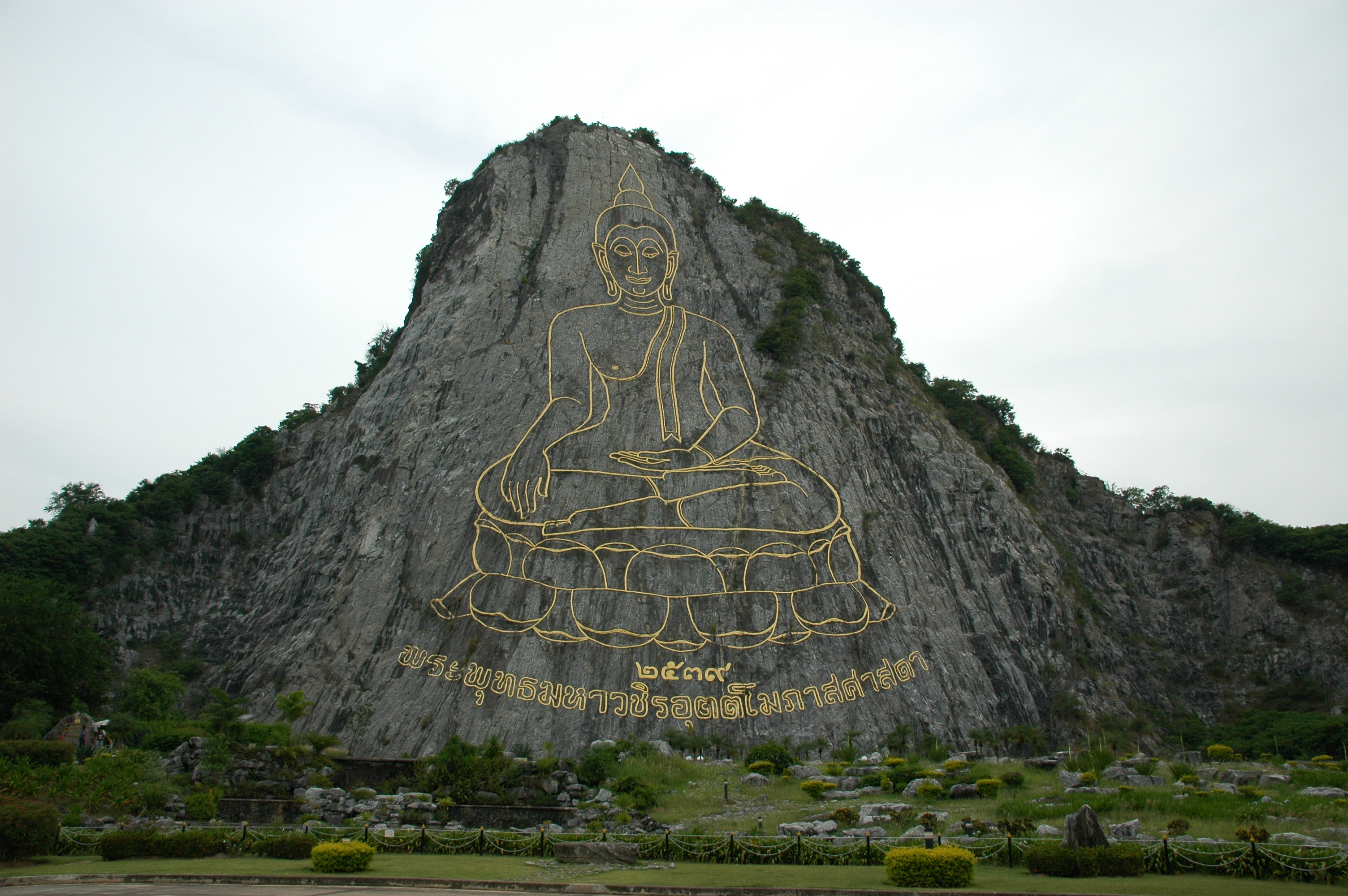
Silhouette of Buddha on the side of Khao Chichan, Chonburi.

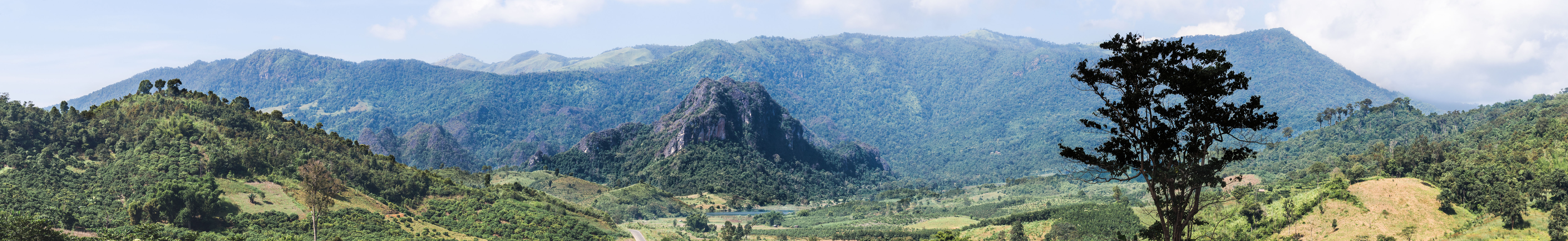
Phi Pan Nam Range from Rte 1148 between Nan and Phayao.

The following is a list of mountains in Thailand. The elevations are in metres. Latin script uses the Royal Thai General System of Transcription.

Note: Many mountains in the country are important not because of their height, but because of their symbolic and cultural significance. Some mountains have holy places at the summit, like Doi Suthep near Chiang Mai, while others have been adopted as provincial symbols, like relatively small Khao Sam Muk in Chonburi Province. Since an order by height is conventional, the list follows this order, without in any way intending to diminish or promote the importance of any particular mountain.

== List ==
=== Greater than 2,000 metres (6,562 ft) ===
Name	Thai	Range	Province	Elev.	Observations
Doi Inthanon	ดอยอินทนนท์	Thanon Thong Chai	Chiang Mai	2,565	Highest point in Thailand. Formerly known as Doi Luang
Doi Pha Hom Pok	ดอยผ้าห่มปก	Daen Lao	Chiang Mai	2,285	Donner: 2,296 m; highest peak of the Daen Lao Range on the Thai side of the border
Doi Chiang Dao	ดอยหลวง เชียงดาว	Daen Lao	Chiang Mai	2,175	Also known as Doi Luang Chiang Dao. 2,225 m in some sources
Khao Kacheu La	เขากะเจอลา		Tak	2,152	
Phu Soi Dao	ภูสอยดาว	Luang Prabang Range	Uttaradit	2,120	Highest point of the Luang Prabang Range in Thailand
Phu Khe	ภูเข้	Luang Prabang	Nan	2,079	
Phu Lo	ภูโล	Luang Prabang	Nan	2,077	Also known as Doi Lo
Doi Mae Tho	ดอยแม่โถ	Khun Tan	Chiang Rai	2,031	Highest point of the Khun Tan Range; also known as Doi Lang Ka or Doi Langka Luang
Doi Mae Ya	ดอยแม่ยะ		Mae Hong Son	2,005	
Doi Phong Sa Yan	ดอยโป่งสะแยน		Mae Hong Son	2,004	

=== Greater than 1,000 metres (3,281 ft) ===
Name	Thai	Range	Province	Elev.	Observations
Doi Phu Kha	ยอดดอยภูคา	Luang Prabang Range	Nan	1910	
Khao Mo Ko Chu	ยอดเขาโมโกจู	Dawna Range	Kamphaeng Phet	1964	Highest peak of the Dawna Range in Thailand
Doi Chang	ยอดดอยช้าง		Chiang Mai	1962	
Doi Dong Ya Wai	ดอยดงหญ้าหวาย	Luang Prabang Range	Nan	1939	
Doi Ang Khang	ดอยอ่างขาง		Chiang Mai	1928	
Doi Lan	ดอยลาน		Mae Hong Son	1918	
Doi Pha Tang	ดอยผาตั้ง		Chiang Mai	1909	
Doi Khang Ho	ดอยค้างฮ่อ	Luang Prabang Range	Nan	1904	
Doi Hua Mot Noi	ยอดดอยหัวหมดน้อย	Thanon Thong Chai Range	Chiang Mai	1900	
Khao Yen	ยอดเขาเย็น		Kamphaeng Phet	1898	
Doi Hua Suea	ยอดดอยหัวเสือ		Chiang Mai	1881	
Doi Phu Wae	ดอยภูแว		Nan	1837	
Doi Wiang Pha	ดอยเวียงผา		Chiang Mai	1834	
Doi Chom Hang	ดอยจอมห้าง	Luang Prabang Range	Nan	1830	
Doi Khun Nam Nan	ดอยขุนน้ำน่าน	Luang Prabang Range	Nan	1817	1,816 m high (), .
Doi Saket	ดอยสะเก็ด		Chiang Mai	1816	, also known as Doi Khun On (ดอยขุนออน)
Doi Puk Phakka	ดอยปุกผักกา		Chiang Mai	1794	
Phu Thap Boek	ภูทับเบิก	Phetchabun Range	Phetchabun	1794	Highest point of the Phetchabun Mountains
Khao Luang	ยอดเขาหลวง	Tenasserim Hills	Nakhon Si Thammarat	1780	Highest point of the Tenasserim Hills in Thailand
Doi Pa Kha	ดอยป่าคา	Luang Prabang Range	Nan	1772	
Doi Chi	ยอดดอยจี๋	Phi Pan Nam Range	Nan	1752	
Doi Pui Luang	ยอดดอยปุยหลวง		Mae Hong Son	1752	
Doi Phu Sanan	ดอยภูสะนาน	Luang Prabang Range	Nan	1751	
Khao Paeng Ma	เขาแผงม้า		Phetchabun	1746	
Doi Phi Pan Nam	ยอดดอยผีปันน้ำ	Luang Prabang Range	Nan	1745	
Doi Khun Yom	ดอยขุนยม	Khun Tan Range	Lampang	1740	
Doi Phu Kha	ดอยภูคา	Phi Pan Nam Range	Nan	1728	
Doi Kio Chi	ดอยกิ่วจี	Luang Prabang Range	Nan	1723	
Doi Pui	ยอดดอยปุย		Mae Hong Son	1722	
Doi Chang	ยอดดอยช้าง	Khun Tan Range	Chiang Rai	1720	
Doi Chom Hot	ยอดดอยจอมหด		Chiang Mai	1718	
Doi Pang Kop Tai	ดอยปางกบใต้		Nan	1712	
Doi Pung Kia	ดอยปุงเกี้ย		Chiang Mai	1708	
Doi Khun Nam Paet	ดอยขุนน้ำแปด	Luang Prabang Range	Nan	1702	
Doi Mot	ดอยมด		Chiang Rai	1700	
Doi Kio Rai Mong	ยอดดอยกิ่วไร่ม้ง		Chiang Mai	1699	
Doi Luang	ยอดดอยหลวง	Phi Pan Nam Range	Phayao	1694	Highest point in the Phi Pan Nam Range
Doi Pui	ยอดดอยปุย	Thanon Thong Chai Range	Chiang Mai	1685	
Doi Suthep	ดอยสุเทพ	Thanon Thong Chai Range	Chiang Mai	1676	1,601 m in various sources
Doi Wao	ยอดดอยวาว	Phi Pan Nam Range	Nan	1674	
Doi Phu Fa	ดอยภูฟ้า	Luang Prabang Range	Nan	1670	
Doi Phu Huat	ดอยภูหวด	Luang Prabang Range	Nan	1667	
Phu Lom Lo	ภูลมโล		Phitsanulok	1664	
Doi Sam Sao	ดอยสามเส้า		Chiang Rai	1662	Also known as Doi Sam Sao Yai
Doi Nok Wua	ดอยหนอกวัว	Luang Prabang Range	Nan	1658	
Doi Khun Lan	ดอยขุนลาน	Luang Prabang Range	Nan	1652	
Doi Khun Huai Pa Dong Daeng	ดอยขุนห้วยป่าดงแดง	Luang Prabang Range	Nan	1650	
Doi Ku Sathan	ดอยกู่สถาน	Phi Pan Nam Range	Nan	1630	
Doi Pha Tang	ดอยผาตั้ง		Chiang Rai	1608	
Doi Pang Kop	ดอยปางกบ		Nan	1592	
Phu Pha Lek	ภูผาเล็ก	Luang Prabang Range	Nan	1589	
Phu Luang	ภูหลวง	Phetchabun Range	Loei	1571	
Doi Daen Din	ดอยแดนดิน	Luang Prabang Range	Nan	1558	
Khao Soi Dao Nua	เขาสอยดาวเหนือ	Cardamom Mountains	Chanthaburi	?	Not to be confused with Phu Soi Dao in Uttaradit Province
Yot Khun Tian	ยอดขุนเตียน		Chiang Mai	1550	
Doi Mae Sa Noi	ยอดดอยแม่สาน้อย		Chiang Mai	1549	
Doi Phong Sanit	ดอยโป่งสมิต		Chiang Mai	1547	
Ulu Titi Basah	ยูลูติติ บาซาห์	Tenasserim Hills	Yala	1533	Southernmost high peak of Thailand, at the border with Malaysia
Doi Khun Nam	ดอยขุนน้ำ	Luang Prabang Range	Nan	1530	
Khao Nong			Surat Thani	1530	
Doi Hin Luang	ดอยหินหลวง		Chiang Mai	1518	
Doi Khun Nam Pun	ดอยขุนน้ำปูน	Luang Prabang Range	Nan	1514	
Khao Phu Miang	เขาภูเมี่ยง		Uttaradit	1500	
Doi Khun Nam Ngaeng	ดอยขุนน้ำแงง	Luang Prabang Range	Nan	1490	
Doi Pha Daeng	ดอยผาแดง		Nan	1486	
Doi Huai Mai Khong	ดอยห้วยไม้คอง		Mae Hong Son	1474	
Doi Phu Lak Muen	ดอยภูหลักหมื่น	Luang Prabang Range	Nan	1470	
Doi Huai Mi Samat	ดอยห้วยมีสะมาด		Mae Hong Son	1465	
Phu Wit	ภูวิทย์		Nan	1461	
Doi Khon Rong	ยอดดอยค่อมร่อง		Chiang Mai	1459	
Doi Pha Ngaem	ดอยผาแง่ม	Luang Prabang Range	Nan	1450	
Phu Chi Fa	ภูชี้ฟ้า		Chiang Rai	1442	
Khun Khlong Lan	ขุนคลองลาน		Kamphaeng Phet	1439	
Doi Khun Huai Hok	ดอยขุนห้วยฮอก	Luang Prabang Range	Nan	1438	
Khao Nan Yai	ยอดเขานันใหญ่	Tenasserim Hills	Nakhon Si Thammarat	1438	
Doi Khun Huai Kai	ดอยขุนห้วยกาย	Luang Prabang Range	Nan	1429	
Doi Mae Chok	ดอยแม่จอก	Phi Pan Nam Range	Nan	1424	
Doi Huai Luang	ดอยห้วยหลวง		Chiang Mai	1415	
Phu Suan Sai	ภูนสวนทราย	Phetchabun Range	Loei	1408	
Doi Plai Huai Mae Chayam	ดอยปลายห้วยแม่จ๋ายำ		Mae Hong Son	1407	
Khao Phanom Bencha	เขาพนมเบญจา	Tenasserim Hills	Krabi	1397	Symbol of Krabi Province
Doi Luang	ดอยหลวง	Phi Pan Nam Range	Phrae/Nan	1396	
Doi Prae Mueang	ดอยแปรเมือง	Phi Pan Nam Range	Nan	1395	
Doi Pang Hua Chang	ดอยปางหัวช้าง	Luang Prabang Range	Nan	1390	
Doi Tung	ดอยตุง	Daen Lao Range	Chiang Rai	1389	
Doi Phu Sam Liam	ดอยภูสามเหลี่ยม	Luang Prabang Range	Nan	1370	
Doi Mae Salong	ดอยแม่สลอง	Daen Lao Range	Chiang Rai	1367	
Phu Ruea	ภูเรือ	Phetchabun Range	Loei	1365	
Doi Pu Na	ดอยปูนา	Luang Prabang Range	Nan	1364	
Doi Ban Huai Ha	ดอยบ้านห้วยฮะ	Daen Lao Range	Mae Hong Son	1359	
Doi Lak Muen	ดอยหลักหมื่น	Luang Prabang Range	Nan	1352	
Doi Phakho	ดอยผาคอ		Mae Hong Son	1352	
Khao Rom	เขาร่ม	Sankamphaeng Range	Nakhon Ratchasima	1351	Highest point of the Sankamphaeng Range, where Khao Yai National Park is located
Khun Huai Duea	ขุนห้วยเดื่อ	Luang Prabang Range	Nan	1350	
Doi Khun Tan	ดอยขุนตาน	Khun Tan Range	Lampang	1348	
Doi Chong	ยอดดอยจง		Lampang	1339	
Doi Luang Mae Khun	ดอยหลวงแม่ขุน			1334	
Doi Luang Pae Mueang	ดอยหลวงแปเมือง	Phi Pan Nam Range	Chiang Rai	1328	Located west of Chiang Khong town
Khao Khwae		Tenasserim Hills	Kanchanaburi	1327	
Khao Laem	เขาแหลม	Sankamphaeng Range	Nakhon Ratchasima	1326	
Phu Kradueng	ภูกระดึง	Phetchabun Range	Loei	1316	
Doi Mae Lip	ดอยแม่ลีบ		Chiang Mai	1311	
Doi Ton Huai Dong Ching	ดอยต้นห้วยตองจิง		Mae Hong Son	1310	
Doi Khun Khun	ดอยขุนคูณ		Nan	1307	
Khao Khiao	เขาเขียว	Sankamphaeng Range	Nakhon Ratchasima	1292	
Doi Huai Ko	ดอยห้วยโก๊ะ		Nan	1290	
Phu Phachit	ภูผาจิต		Phetchabun	1271	
Khao Kamphaeng	ยอดเขากำแพง	Tenasserim Hills	Kanchanaburi	1260	
Khao Chang Phueak	เขาช้างเผือก	Tenasserim Hills	Kanchanaburi	1249	
Doi Yot Huai Nam Lao	ดอยยอดห้วยน้ำลาว		Nan	1243	
Doi Mae Kham Phaen	ดอยแม่คำเพียร		Nan	1239	
Khao Khun Huai Huek	ยอดเขาขุนห้วยฮึก		Nan	1234	
Doi Nam Phang	ดอยน้ำพาง		Nan	1229	
Pha Dam	ผาดำ		Nan	1222	
Khao Phanoen Thung	เขาพะเนินทุ่ง	Tenasserim Hills	Phetchaburi	1214	
Phu Nong Kliang	ภูหนองเกลี้ยง		Nan	1210	
Pha Kluan	ผาเกลื่อน		Nan	1208	
Khao Panoen Thung	เขาพะเนินทุ่ง		Phetchaburi	1207	
Doi Hua Lon	ดอยหัวโล้น		Nan	1202	
Doi Kiao Lom	ดอยกิ่วลม		Lampang	1202	
Doi Phu Nang	ดอยภูนาง	Phi Pan Nam Range	Phayao	1202	
Phra Mae Ya	พระแม่ย่า	Phi Pan Nam Range	Sukhothai	1200	
Doi Wai	ดอยไหว		Nan	1195	
Doi Ian	ดอยเอียน	Phi Pan Nam Range	Chiang Rai	1174	Located east of Thoeng
Phu Khing	ภูคิ้ง	Dong Phaya Yen Range	Chaiyaphum	1167	Highest summit of the Dong Phaya Yen Range
Doi Khun Nam Suat	ดอยขุนน้ำสวด		Nan	1151	
Khao Kho	เขาค้อ	Phetchabun Range	Phetchabun	1143	
Khao Sam Yot	เขาสามยอด	Sankamphaeng Range	Nakhon Ratchasima	1142	
Doi Pha Chi	ดอยผาจิ		Nan	1128	
Doi Hu	ดอยฮู		Nan	1124	
Khao Tewada			Suphan Buri	1123	
Doi Mon Phi Tai	ดอยม่อนผีตาย		Nan	1107	
Doi Cham Hang	ดอยจำห้าง		Nan	1105	
Doi Luang	ดอยหลวง	Phi Pan Nam Range	Lampang	1100	
Khao Nom Sao	เขานมสาว		Ranong	1089	
Khao Phra Bat	ยอดเขาพระบาท		Chanthaburi	1085	
Khao Fa Pha	เขาฟ้าผ่า	Sankamphaeng Range	Nakhon Ratchasima	1078	
Phu Sakhan	ภูสะคาน		Nan	1070	
Doi Pha Chong	ดอยผาจอง		Nan	1068	
Khao Um Yom	ยอดเขาอุมยอม		Tak	1065	
Doi Hua Mot	ดอยหัวหมด		Tak	1059	
Khun Nam Un	ขุนน้ำอุ่น		Nan	1050	
Doi Khun Huai Loi	ดอยขุนห้วยลอย		Nan	1042	
Doi Khun Nam Lae	ดอยขุนน้ำและ		Nan	1033	
Doi San Klang	ดอยสันกลาง		Lampang	1022	
Phu Yuen	ภูยืน		Nan	1021	
Khao Phang Hoei		Phang Hoei Range	Chaiyaphum	1008	
Doi Yai	ดอยใหญ่		Nan	1003	

=== Below 1,000 metres (3,281 ft) ===
Name	Thai	Range	Province	Elev.	Observations
Doi Pha Huat	ดอยผาหวด		Lampang	975	
Phanom Kapum Bai Kangeng			Chanthaburi	945	
Doi San Klang	สันกลาง	Phi Pan Nam	Chiang Rai	938	
Phu Hot	ภูฮอด		Nan	890	
Khun Nam Lat	ขุนน้ำลาด		Nan	887	
Khao Kamphaeng	เขากำแพง		Nakhon Ratchasima	875	
Phu Khi	ภูคี	Dong Phaya Yen	Chaiyaphum	875	Highest summit in the Phu Lan Ka National Park area
Doi Pui	ดอยปุย	Phi Pan Nam	Chiang Rai	843	
Khao Yuet	เขายืด (เขาพระรอบ)	Tenasserim Hills	Ratchaburi	834	, also known as Khao Phra Lop
Doi Nang Non	ดอยนางนอน	Daen Lao	Chiang Rai	830	
Doi Ha	ดอยทา	Phi Pan Nam	Chiang Rai	827	Located right above Thoeng
Doi Ngop	ดอยงอบ		Nan	792	
Khao Khiao	เขาเขียว	Khao Khiao Massif	Chonburi	789	Highest point of the Khao Khiao Massif
Khao Chin		Tenasserim Hills	Satun	756	
Phu Khi Suk	ภูขี้สุข	Dângrêk	Ubon Ratchathani	753	Highest point of the Phanom Dong Rak Range
Khao Nom Nang	เขานมนาง	Tenasserim Hills	Kanchanaburi	752	Breast-shaped hill near Erawan National Park
Khao Tabaek	เขาตะแบก	Khao Khiao Massif	Chonburi	732	
Phu Ang So	ภูอ่างสอ		Sakhon Nakhon	695	
Khao Bo Chomphu	เขาบ่อชมภู	Khao Khiao Massif	Chonburi	667	611 m according to the nautical chart Also known as Khao Chomphu
Phu Lang Ka	ภูลังกา	Phu Phan	Nakhon Phanom	641	Highest elevation in the Phu Phan Mountains
Khao Ra	เขารา		Surat Thani	627	Ko Pha Ngan's highest mountain
Phu Mai Hia	ภูไม้เฮียะ	Phu Phan	Mukdahan	624	
Chong Bok	ช่องบก	Dangrek	Ubon Ratchathani	604	Border tripoint
Phu Ya U	ภูย่าอู่	Phu Phan	Udon Thani	588	
Phu Langka Nuea	ภูลังกาเหนือ	Phu Phan	Nakhon Phanom	563	
Doi Lan	ดอยลาน	Phi Pan Nam Range	Chiang Rai	559	Located south of Chiang Rai Town
Doi Wiang Mok	ดอยเวียงมอก	Phi Pan Nam	Chiang Rai	546	Near Ban Wiang Mok
Khao Ban That	ยอดเขาบรรทัด	Dangrek	Ubon Ratchathani	543	
Doi Hin Kaeo	ดอยหินแก้ว		Nan	491	
Phu Kra Sa	ยอดภูกระซะ	Phu Phan	Mukdahan	481	
Phu Chong Si	ภูจอมศรี	Phu Phan	Mukdahan	420	
Khao Chamun	เขาจมื่น		Chanthaburi	405	
Phu Thok	ภูทอก	Isolated hill	Bueng Kan	359	Symbol of Bueng Kan Province
Khao Cha Ang	เขาชะอางค์		Chonburi	260	
Khao Chakan	เขาฉกรรจ์		Sa Kaeo	240	
Khao Chang	เขาช้าง		Phang Nga	240	
Khao No-Khao Kaeo	เขาหน่อ-เขาแก้ว	Isolated hills	Nakhon Sawan	231	
Khao Tha Phet	เขาท่าเพชร		Surat Thani	210	
Khao Phlong	เขาพลอง	Isolated hill	Chai Nat	189	
Khao Ok Talu	เขาอกทะลุ		Phatthalung	177	
Khao Sakae Krang	เขาสะแกกรัง	Isolated hill	Uthai Thani	148	
Khao Thong Chai	เขาธงชัย	Tenasserim Hills	Prachuap Khiri Khan	85	Located by the seashore in Bang Saphan District
Phu Khao Thong	ภูเขาทอง	Artificial hill	Bangkok	78	
Khao Sam Muk	เขาสามมุข	Isolated hill	Chonburi	54	Symbol of Chonburi Province

== Bibliography ==
- Avijit Gupta, The Physical Geography of Southeast Asia, Oxford University Press, 2005. ISBN 978-0-19-924802-5
- Wolf Donner: The Five Faces of Thailand. Institute of Asian Affairs, Hamburg 1978, Paperback Edition: University of Queensland Press, St. Lucia, Queensland 1982, ISBN 0-7022-1665-8
- National Parks in Thailand (PDF). Department of National Parks (Thailand). 2015. ISBN 978-616-316-240-3.
