= Khiri Rat Nikhom district =

Khiri Rat Nikhom คีรีรัฐนิคม
- District
- District location in Surat Thani province
- Coordinates: 9°1′48″N 98°57′12″E
- Country: Thailand
- Province: Surat Thani
- Seat: Tha Khanon

Area
  - Total: 812.3 km^{2} (313.6 sq mi)

Population (2005)
  - Total: 39,957
  - Density: 49.2/km^{2} (127/sq mi)
- Time zone: UTC+7 (ICT)
- Postal code: 84180
- Geocode: 8408

Khiri Rat Nikhom (Thai: คีรีรัฐนิคม, pronounced [kʰīː.rīː rát ní(ʔ).kʰōm]) is a district (amphoe) in western Surat Thani province, southern Thailand.

== Geography ==
The western part of the district is in the hills of the Phuket mountain range, while to the east the terrain is mostly flat. The main rivers are the Phum Duang and Yan Rivers.

A portion of the Khlong Saeng Wildlife Sanctuary occupies the district.

Neighboring districts are (from north clockwise): Vibhavadi, Phunphin district, Khian Sa, Phanom, and Ban Ta Khun.

== History ==
The town was first mentioned during the reign of King Mongkut (Rama IV), when it was a minor mueang under Takua Pa and part of the Nakhon Si Thammarat Kingdom. During the thesaphiban administrative reforms in the 1890s it became a district in Chaiya Province, present day Surat Thani.

In 1917 the district was renamed Tha Khanon (ท่าขนอน), as the district office was in that area. On 12 April 1961 the name was changed back to its historical name.

== Transport ==
Khiri Rat Nikhom is the endpoint of a branch of the southern railway, originally planned to run to Phuket, but construction was halted in 1956.

== Administration ==
The district is divided into eight sub-districts (tambons), which are further subdivided into 84 villages (mubans). Tha Khanon has sub-district municipality (thesaban tambon) status and covers parts of tambon Tha Khanon. Each of the eight tambons is administered by a tambon administrative organization (TAO).

No.	Name	Thai name	Villages	Pop.
1.	Tha Khanon	ท่าขนอน	15	7,308
2.	Ban Yang	บ้านยาง	11	3,717
3.	Nam Hak	น้ำหัก	10	3,930
6.	Kapao	กะเปา	10	3,498
7.	Tha Kradan	ท่ากระดาน	9	3,027
8.	Yan Yao	ย่านยาว	10	4,402
9.	Tham Singkhon	ถ้ำสิงขร	10	4,415
10.	Ban Thamniap	บ้านทำเนียบ	9	9,660

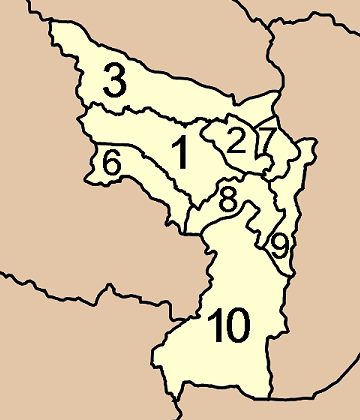
Map of subdistricts

The missing numbers 4 and 5 are tambons which were split off to form Vibhavadi District.
