= Tha Chang district, Surat Thani =

Tha Chang ท่าฉาง
- District
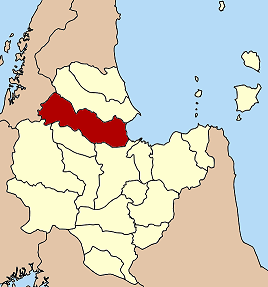
- District location in Surat Thani province
- Coordinates: 9°16′51″N 99°12′3″E
- Country: Thailand
- Province: Surat Thani
- Seat: Khao Than

Area
  - Total: 1,167.7 km^{2} (450.9 sq mi)

Population (2005)
  - Total: 31,013
  - Density: 26.56/km^{2} (68.8/sq mi)
- Time zone: UTC+7 (ICT)
- Postal code: 84150
- Geocode: 8411

Tha Chang (Thai: ท่าฉาง, pronounced [tʰâː t͡ɕʰǎːŋ]) is a district (amphoe) in the west of Surat Thani province of southern Thailand.

Neighboring districts are Chaiya to the north, and to the west the district Kapoe of Ranong province. Bandon Bay to the east, Phunphin district, Vibhavadi and Ban Ta Khun to the south,

== History ==
The minor district (king amphoe) was created on 31 July 1908, consisting of tambons Than, Pak Chalui, and Sawiat of Phum Riang District and Tha Khoei, Tha Chang, and Khlong Sai of Phunphin District. The minor district was made a subordinate of Phum Riang district. It was upgraded to a full district on 1 August 1938.

== Geography ==
The district extends from the coast to the Bandon Bay in the east to the ridges of the Phuket mountain range, which forms the boundary between the provinces Surat Thani and Ranong. Located in these hills is the Kaeng Krung National Park.

The district is crossed by the southern railway, as well as Asian highway AH2.

== Administration ==
The district is divided into six sub-districts (tambons), which in turn are subdivided into 46 villages (mubans). Each of the tambons is administered by a tambon administrative organization (TAO). Tha Chang itself has township (thesaban tambon) status and covers parts of tambons Tha Chang and Khao Than.

No.	Name	Thai name	Villages	Pop.
1.	Tha Chang	ท่าฉาง	5	5,256
2.	Tha Khoei	ท่าเคย	11	5,703
3.	Khlong Sai	คลองไทร	9	4,978
4.	Khao Than	เขาถ่าน	6	4,613
5.	Sawiat	เสวียด	9	4,967
6.	Pak Chalui	ปากฉลุย	6	5,496

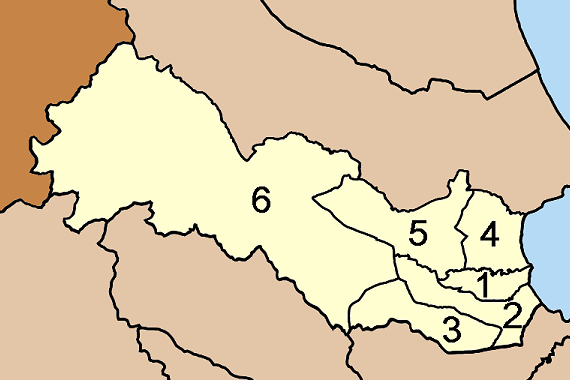
