= Khao Sam Muk =

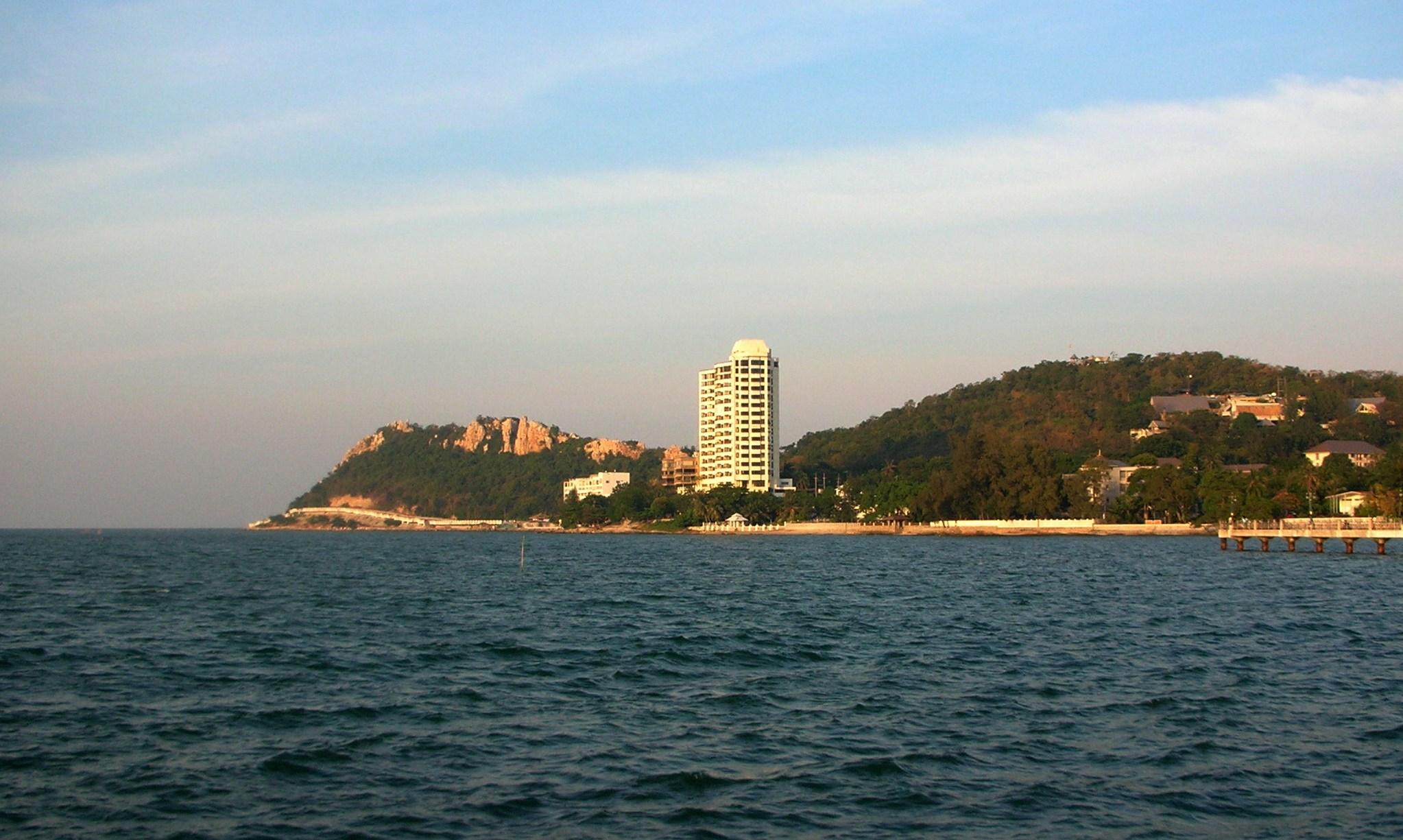

Highest point
- Elevation: 54 m (177 ft)
- Listing: List of mountains in Thailand
- Coordinates: 13°18′46″N 100°54′17″E

Geography
- Location within Thailand
- Location: Chonburi, Thailand

Geology
- Mountain type: sandstone

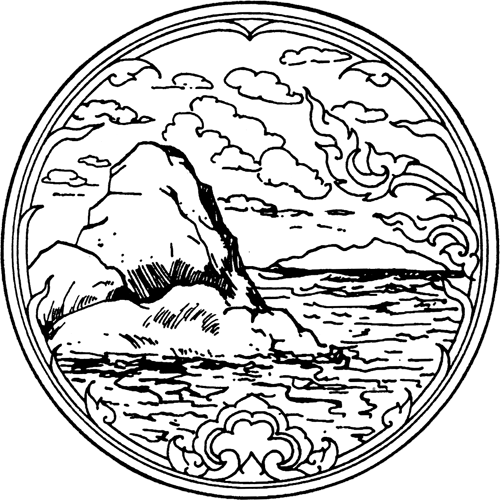
Provincial seal of Chonburi with Khao Sam Muk in the forefront and Ko Sichang Island in the background

Khao Sam Muk (Thai: เขาสามมุข, pronounced [kʰǎw sǎːm múk]), is a 45 m (147.64 ft) high hill in Chonburi Province, Thailand. It is in Chonburi city on Bangkok Bay between Ang Sila and Bang Saen Beach. There is a Chinese shrine of Mazu on the hilltop which affords views of the surrounding landscape, including Bang Saen Beach, and there is another shrine at the foot of the escarpment. This shrine is a Thai shrine built according to the legend of this hill.

== Legends and symbolism ==
Khao Sam Muk has symbolic significance in Chonburi. Local people believe that the spirit of that mountain protects fishers from harm. One legend tells that the wife of a fisherman waited on the hill for her husband who was lost at sea. Another legend tells that in the 18th century a poor Chinese girl named Sam Muk jumped to her death from the cliff after her parents objected to her marriage to her lover, becoming deified after her death. In some versions both the girl and her lover threw themselves from the escarpment. Sam Muk hill appears in somewhat stylized form in the provincial seal of Chonburi.

== See also ==
- List of mountains in Thailand
- Chonburi Province
- Seals of the provinces of Thailand
