= Phum Duang River =

River in southern Thailand

The Phum Duang River (Thai: แม่น้ำพุมดวง, RTGS: Maenam Phum Duang, Thai pronunciation: [mɛ̂ːnáːm pʰum duəŋ]) (rarely also called the Khiri Rat River) is a river in Surat Thani Province, southern Thailand, the main tributary of the Tapi River.

The rivers drains an area of 6,125 square kilometres (2,365 sq mi) west of the Tapi watershed, mainly the eastern slopes of the Phuket mountain range. It joins the estuary of the Tapi 5 kilometres (3 mi) west of Surat Thani in Phunphin District.

The river has a total length of 80 km.

== Etymology ==
The etymology of "Phum Duang" is unknown but the etymology for "Khiri Rat" originated from the rivers origination point being in the Khiri Rat Nikhom District at the confluence of the Phrasaeng and Sok rivers.
