= Phuket Range =

Mountain range in Thailand

- ทิวเขาภูเก็ต
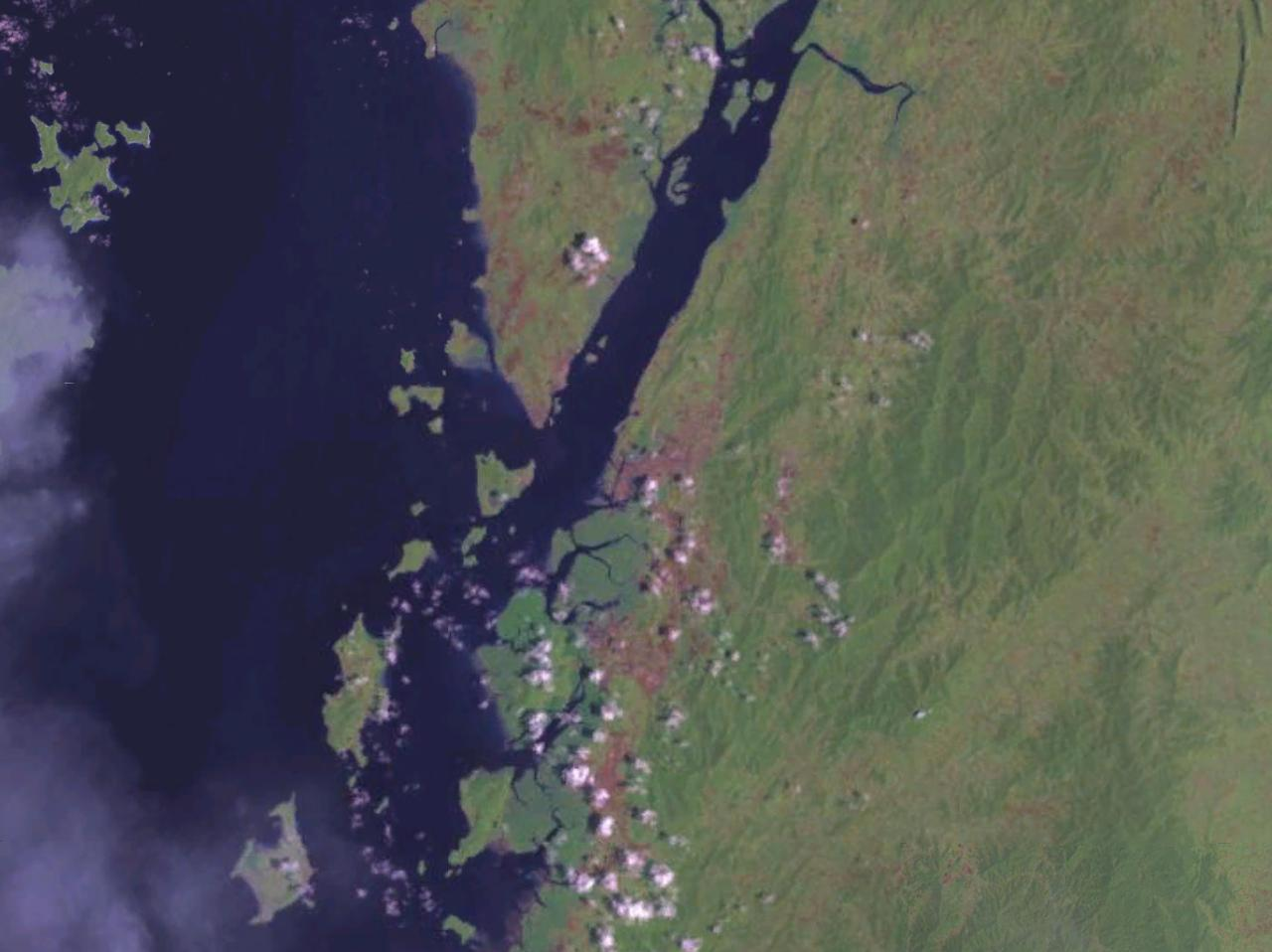
- NASA picture of the northern part of the range

Highest point
- Peak: Khao Langkha Tuek
- Elevation: 1,395 m (4,577 ft)
- Coordinates: 9°20′30″N 98°37′0″E

Dimensions
- Length: 200 km (120 mi) N/S
- Width: 50 km (31 mi) E/W

Geography
- Country: Thailand
- Parent range: Tenasserim Hills

Geology
- Rock age(s): Permian, Triassic
- Rock type(s): granite, limestone

The Phuket Range (Thai: ทิวเขาภูเก็ต, Thio Khao Phuket, IPA: [tʰiw kʰǎw pʰuː.kèt]) is a subrange of the Tenasserim Hills in the Kra Isthmus, Thailand.

== Geography ==
The Phuket Range is a continuation of the greater Tenasserim range, forming one of the southern sections of the central Indo-Malay cordillera, the mountain chain which runs from Tibet through the Malay Peninsula extending southwards for over 200 km. The Nakhon Si Thammarat Range begins 60 km to the east of the southern part of the Phuket Range. Between the ranges there are isolated peaks rising from the lowlands, the highest of which is the 1,350 m high Khao Phanom Bencha near Krabi.

The highest elevation is Khao Langkha Tuek with an elevation of 1395 m. As the hills raise directly from the western coast there are no notable rivers west of the ridge. To the east the largest rivers are the Phum Duang River and the Lang Suan River.

The largest lake within the mountains is the Chiao Lan (Ratchaprapha dam) at 165 km^{2}, an artificial lake within the Khao Sok National Park. The mountains mostly consist of limestone, which leads to the karst geography of steep hills. The hills west of the ridge contain several tin mines, mostly exhausted.

== Protection ==
The range is in the Tenasserim–South Thailand semi-evergreen rain forests ecoregion. Most of the mountains are protected in various national parks and other protected areas. These are (from the south) Si Phang Nga NP, Ton Pariwat Wildlife Sanctuary, Khlong Phanom NP, Khao Sok NP, Khlong Yan Wildlife Sanctuary, Kaeng Krung NP, Khlong Nakha Wildlife Sanctuary and Namtok Ngao NP (formerly named Khlong Phrao NP).
