= Lam Nam Kra Buri National Park =

National park in Thailand

- IUCN category II (national park)
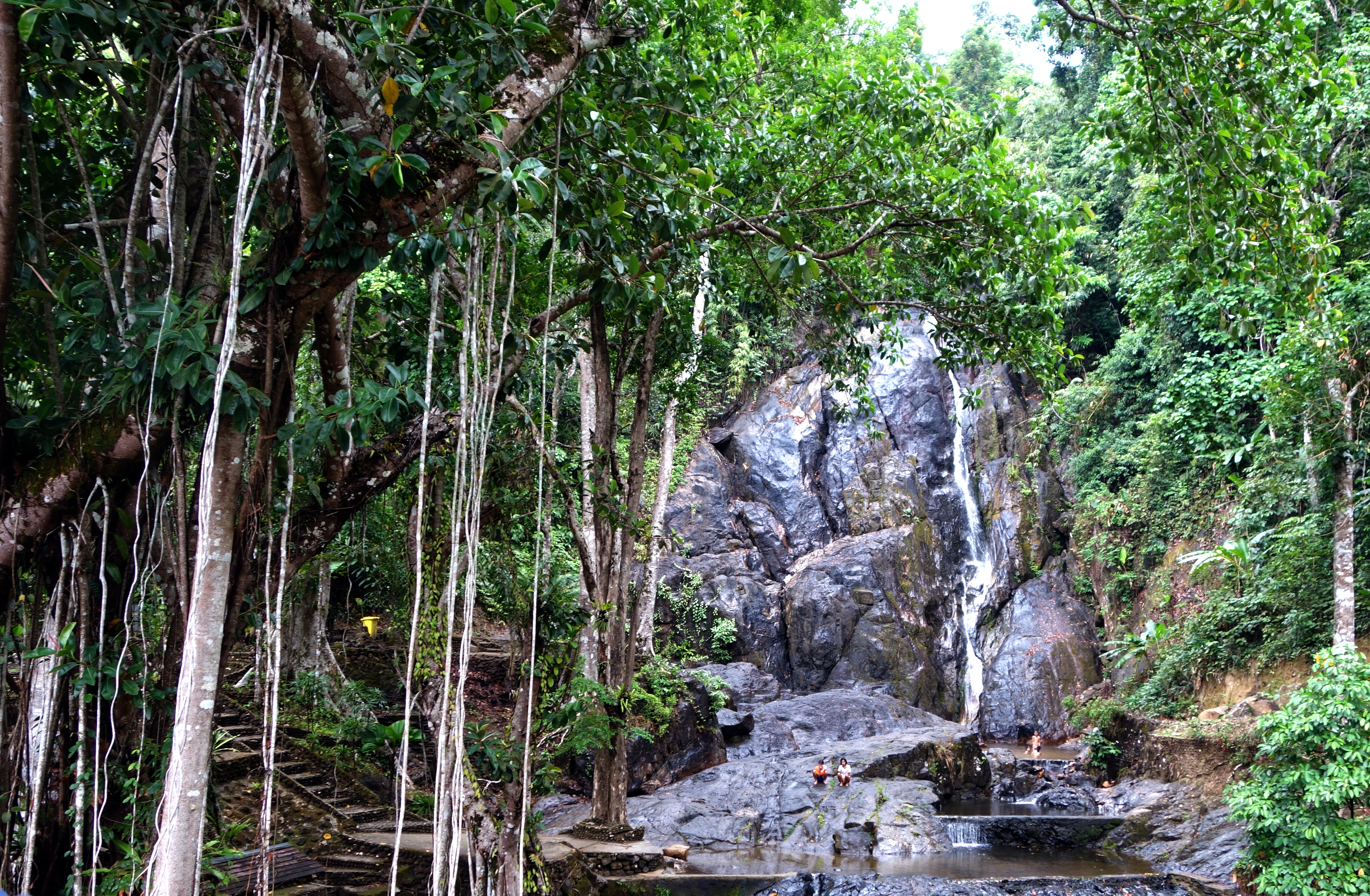
- Punyaban Waterfall

- Park location in Thailand
- Location: Thailand
- Nearest city: Ranong
- Coordinates: 10.0855°N 98.663°E
- Area: 169 km^{2} (65 sq mi)
- Established: 1999
- Governing body: Department of National Parks, Wildlife and Plant Conservation

Lam Nam Kra Buri National Park is a marine national park in Ranong province, Thailand. The park is home to islands, tropical forests and waterfalls.

== Geography ==
Lam Nam Kra Buri National Park is about 18 km (11 mi) from Ranong. The park's total area is 169 km^{2} (65 sq mi), of which 64 km^{2} (25 sq mi) is in the Kra Buri River, which separates Thailand from Myanmar. Six river islands are part of the park: Ko Siat, Ko Khwang, Ko Yao, Ko Chon, Ko Pling and Ko Nok Plao.

== Attractions ==
Waterfalls in the park include Punyaban and Ton Mai Pak waterfalls. The Tham Yipun cave on Ko Khwang was used by the Japanese Army in World War II.

== Flora and fauna ==
The park features tropical rainforest, hosting plant species including Podocarpus wallichianus (now Nageia wallichiana). Mangrove forest along the river is home to species such as Ceriops tagal, Rhizophora mucronata, Rhizophora apiculata, Xylocarpus moluccensis and Xylocarpus granatum.

The park hosts animals including tiger, clouded leopard, Malayan sun bear, crab-eating macaque, dusky leaf monkey, mouse deer and palm civet. Birds in the park include oriental pied hornbill, coucal, hill myna, oriental magpie-robin and red junglefowl.
