= Breast =

Upper region of primate torso

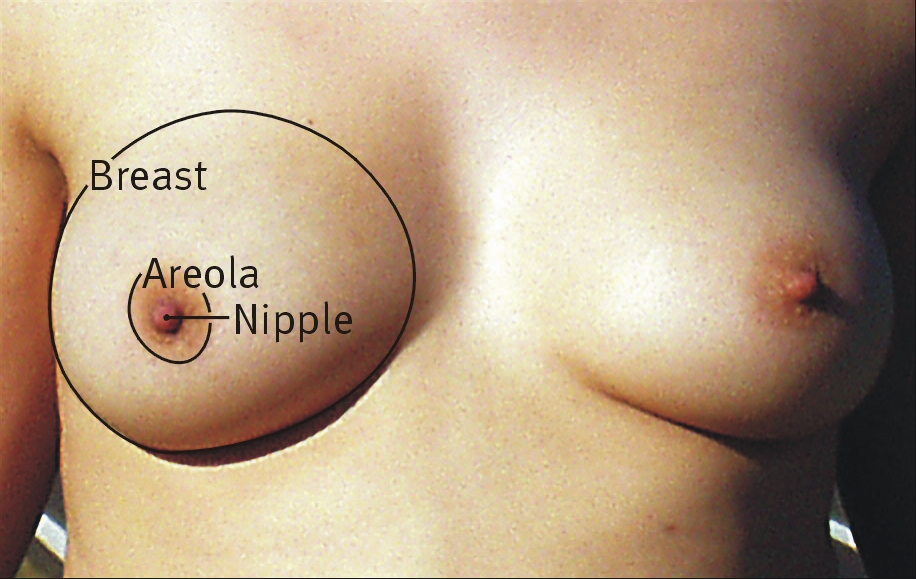
- Morphology of female human breasts, with the areola, nipple, intermammary cleft and inframammary fold

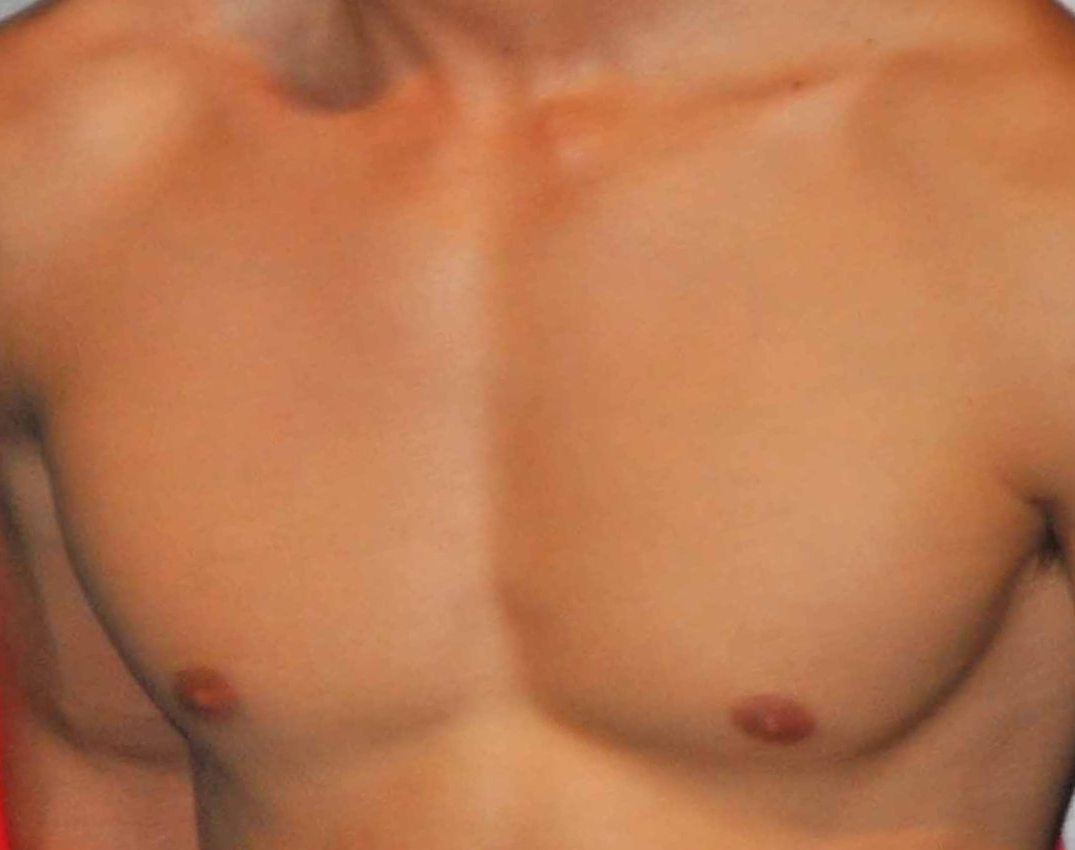
- Male human breasts with defined pectoral muscles

Details
- Artery: Internal thoracic artery
- Vein: Internal thoracic vein

Identifiers
- Latin: mamma (mammalis 'of the breast')

The breasts are two prominences located on the upper ventral region of the torso in humans and other primates. Both sexes develop breasts from the same embryological tissues. The relative size and development of the breasts is a major secondary sex distinction between females and males. There is also considerable variation in size between individuals. Permanent breast growth during puberty is caused by estrogens in conjunction with the growth hormone. Female humans are the only mammals that permanently develop breasts at puberty; all other mammals develop their mammary tissue during the latter period of pregnancy.

In females, the breasts contain mammary glands, which produce and secrete milk to feed infants. Subcutaneous fat covers and envelops a network of ducts that converge on the nipple, and these tissues give the breast its distinct size and globular shape. At the ends of the ducts are lobules, or clusters of alveoli, where milk is produced and stored in response to hormonal signals. During pregnancy, the breast responds to a complex interaction of hormones, including estrogens, progesterone, and prolactin, that mediate the completion of its development, namely lobuloalveolar maturation, in preparation of lactation and breastfeeding.

Along with their major function in providing nutrition for infants, breasts often play a significant role in the perception of a woman's body and sexual attractiveness. Breasts, especially the nipples, can be an erogenous zone, and part of sexual activity. Some cultures ascribe social and sexual characteristics to female breasts, and may regard bare breasts in public as immodest or indecent. Breasts can represent fertility, femininity, or abundance. Breasts have been featured in ancient and modern sculpture, art, and photography.

== Etymology and terminology ==
The English word breast derives from the Old English word brēost 'breast, bosom' from Proto-Germanic *breustam 'breast', from the Proto-Indo-European base *bhreus– 'to swell, to sprout'. The breast spelling conforms to the Scottish and North English dialectal pronunciations. The Merriam-Webster Dictionary states that "Middle English brest, [comes] from Old English brēost; akin to Old High German brust..., Old Irish brú [belly], [and] Russian bryukho"; the first known usage of the term was before the 12th century.

Breasts is often used to refer to female breasts in particular, though the stricter anatomical term refers to the same region on members of either sex. Male breasts are sometimes referred to in the singular to mean the collective upper chest area, (Note: Such that one's hands might be folded "upon one's breast" or one's heart might be "within one's breast") whereas female breasts are referred to in the plural unless speaking of a specific left or right breast.

A large number of colloquial terms for female breasts are used in English, ranging from fairly polite terms to vulgar or slang. (Note: See Wiktionary:Thesaurus:breasts) Some vulgar slang expressions may be considered to be derogatory or sexist to women.

== Evolutionary development ==
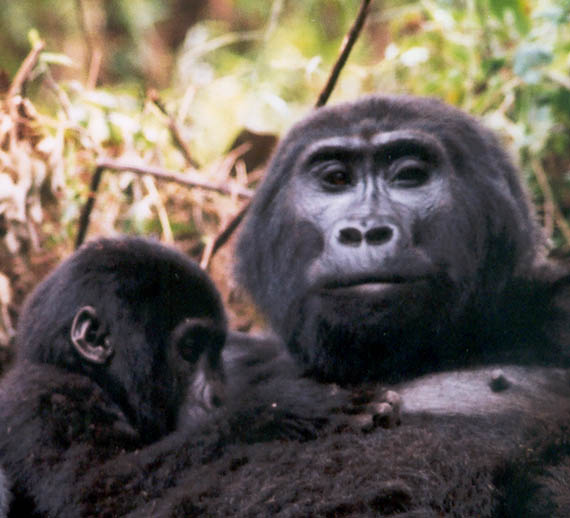
Mountain gorilla breastfeeding an infant

Humans are the only mammals whose breasts become permanently enlarged after sexual maturity (known in humans as puberty). The reason for this evolutionary change is unknown. Several hypotheses have been put forward:

A link has been proposed to processes for synthesizing the endogenous steroid hormone precursor dehydroepiandrosterone which takes place in fat rich regions of the body like the buttocks and breasts. These contributed to human brain development and played a part in increasing brain size. Breast enlargement may for this purpose have occurred as early as Homo ergaster (1.7–1.4 MYA). Other breast formation hypotheses may have then taken over as principal drivers.

It has been suggested by zoologists Avishag and Amotz Zahavi that the size of the human breasts can be explained by the handicap hypothesis of sexual dimorphism. This would see the explanation for larger breasts as them being an honest display of the women's health and ability to grow and carry them in her life. Prospective mates can then evaluate the genes of a potential mate for their ability to sustain her health even with the additional energy demanding burden she is carrying.

The zoologist Desmond Morris describes a sociobiological approach in his science book The Naked Ape. He suggests, by making comparisons with the other primates, that breasts evolved to replace swelling buttocks as a sex signal of ovulation. He notes how humans have, relatively speaking, large penises as well as large breasts. Furthermore, early humans adopted bipedalism and face-to-face coitus. He therefore suggested enlarged sexual signals helped maintain the bond between a mated male and female even though they performed different duties and therefore were separated for lengths of time.

A 2001 study proposed that the rounded shape of a woman's breast evolved to prevent the sucking infant offspring from suffocating while feeding at the teat; that is, because of the human infant's small jaw, which did not project from the face to reach the nipple, they might block the nostrils against the mother's breast if it were of a flatter form (compare with the common chimpanzee). Hypothetically, as the human jaw receded into the face, the woman's body compensated with round breasts.

Ashley Montagu (1965) proposed that breasts came about as an adaptation for infant feeding for a different reason, as early human ancestors adopted bipedalism and the loss of body hair. Human upright stance meant infants must be carried at the hip or shoulder instead of on the back as in the apes. This gives the infant less opportunity to find the nipple or the purchase to cling on to the mother's body hair. The mobility of the nipple on a large breast in most human females gives the infant more ability to find it, grasp it and feed.

Other suggestions include simply that permanent breasts attracted mates, that "pendulous" breasts gave infants something to cling to, or that permanent breasts shared the function of a camel's hump, to store fat as an energy reserve.

== Structure ==
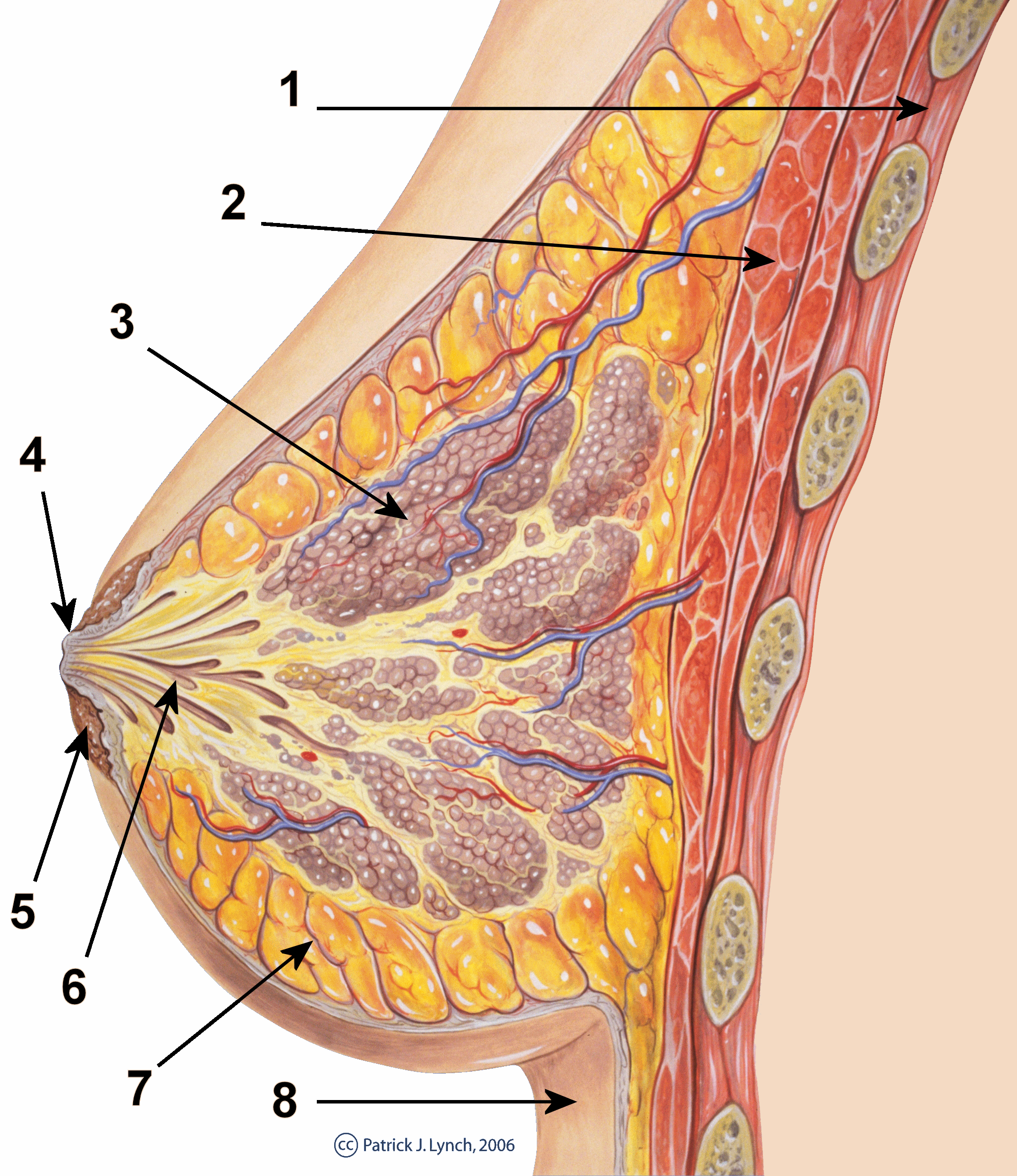
The breast: cross-section scheme of the mammary gland.: 1. Chest wall; 2. Pectoralis muscles; 3. Lobules; 4. Nipple; 5. Areola; 6. Milk duct; 7. Fatty tissue; 8. Skin

In women, the breasts overlie the pectoralis major muscles and extend on average from the level of the second rib to the level of the sixth rib in the front of the rib cage; thus, the breasts cover much of the chest area and the chest walls. At the front of the chest, the breast tissue can extend from the clavicle (collarbone) to the middle of the sternum (breastbone). At the sides of the chest, the breast tissue can extend into the axilla (armpit), and can reach as far to the back as the latissimus dorsi muscle, extending from the lower back to the humerus bone (the bone of the upper arm). As a mammary gland, the breast is composed of differing layers of tissue, predominantly two types: adipose tissue; and glandular tissue, which affects the lactation functions of the breasts. The natural resonant frequency of the human breast is about 2 hertz.

Morphologically, the breast is tear-shaped. The superficial tissue layer (superficial fascia) is separated from the skin by 0.5–2.5 cm of subcutaneous fat (adipose tissue). The suspensory Cooper's ligaments are fibrous-tissue prolongations that radiate from the superficial fascia to the skin envelope. The female adult breast contains 14–18 irregular lactiferous lobes that converge at the nipple. The 2.0–4.5 mm milk ducts are immediately surrounded with dense connective tissue that support the glands. Milk exits the breast through the nipple, which is surrounded by a pigmented area of skin called the areola. The size of the areola can vary widely among women. The areola contains modified sweat glands known as Montgomery's glands. These glands secrete oily fluid that lubricate and protect the nipple during breastfeeding. Volatile compounds in these secretions may also serve as an olfactory stimulus for the newborn's appetite.

The dimensions and weight of the breast vary widely among women. A small-to-medium-sized breast weighs 500 grams (1.1 pounds) or less, and a large breast can weigh approximately 750 to 1,000 grams (1.7 to 2.2 pounds) or more. In terms of composition, the breasts are about 80 to 90% stromal tissue (fat and connective tissue), while epithelial or glandular tissue only accounts for about 10 to 20% of the volume of the breasts. The tissue composition ratios of the breast also vary among women. Some women's breasts have a higher proportion of glandular tissue than of adipose or connective tissues. The fat-to-connective-tissue ratio determines the density or firmness of the breast. During a woman's life, her breasts change size, shape, and weight due to hormonal changes during puberty, the menstrual cycle, pregnancy, breastfeeding, and menopause.

=== Glandular structure ===
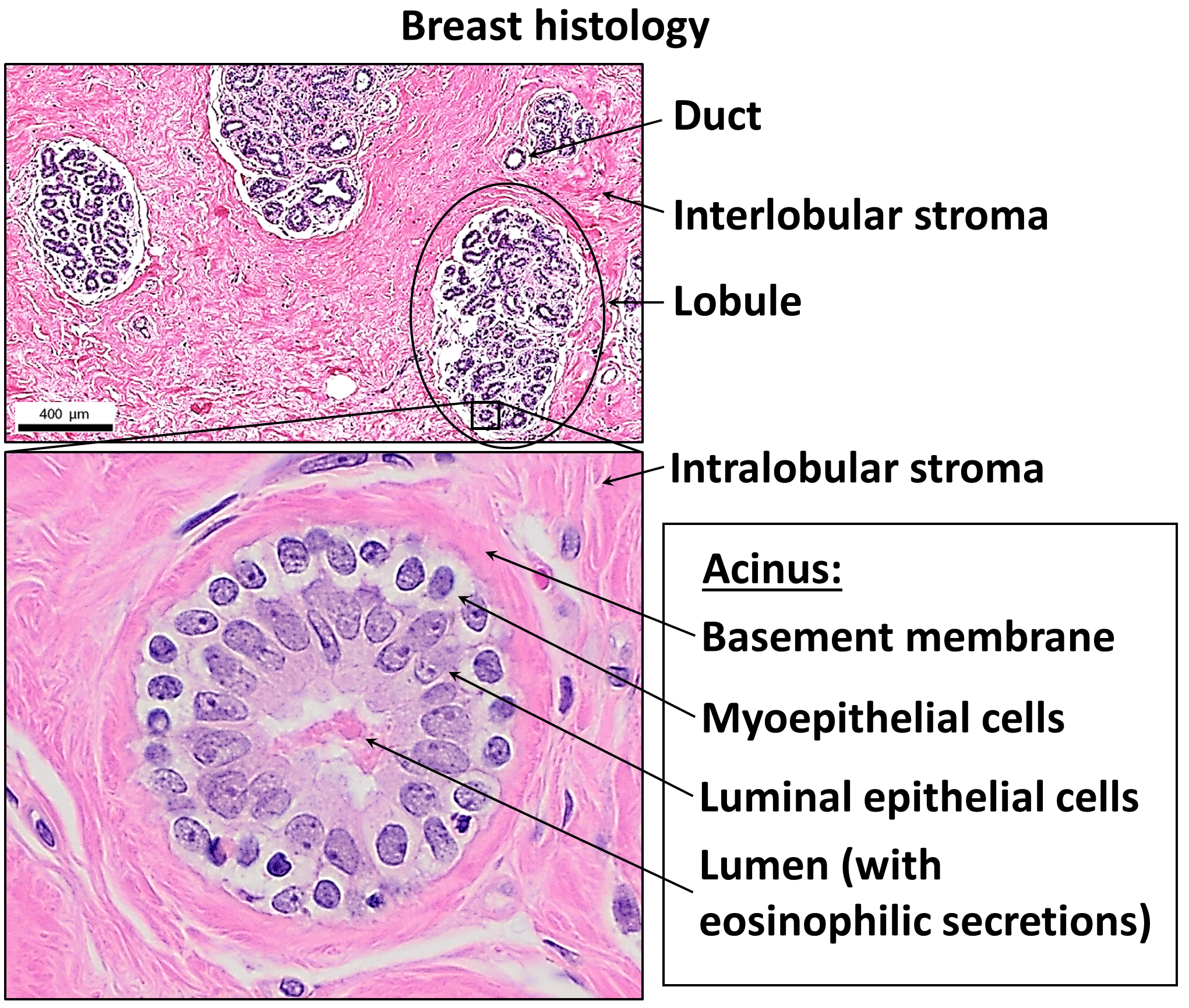
Normal histology of the breast.

The breast is an apocrine gland that produces the milk used to feed an infant. The nipple of the breast is surrounded by the areola (nipple-areola complex). The areola has many sebaceous glands, and the skin color varies from pink to dark brown. The basic units of the breast are the terminal duct lobular units (TDLUs), which produce the fatty breast milk. They give the breast its offspring-feeding functions as a mammary gland. They are distributed throughout the body of the breast. Approximately two-thirds of the lactiferous tissue is within 30 mm of the base of the nipple. The terminal lactiferous ducts drain the milk from TDLUs into 4–18 lactiferous ducts, which drain to the nipple. The milk-glands-to-fat ratio is 2:1 in a lactating woman, and 1:1 in a non-lactating woman. In addition to the milk glands, the breast is also composed of connective tissues (collagen, elastin), white fat, and the suspensory Cooper's ligaments. Sensation in the breast is provided by the peripheral nervous system innervation by means of the front (anterior) and side (lateral) cutaneous branches of the fourth-, fifth-, and sixth intercostal nerves. The T-4 nerve (Thoracic spinal nerve 4), which innervates the dermatomic area, supplies sensation to the nipple-areola complex.

=== Lymphatic drainage ===
Approximately 75% of the lymph from the breast travels to the axillary lymph nodes on the same side of the body, while 25% of the lymph travels to the parasternal nodes (beside the sternum bone). A small amount of remaining lymph travels to the other breast and to the abdominal lymph nodes. The subareolar region has a lymphatic plexus known as the "subareolar plexus of Sappey". The axillary lymph nodes include the pectoral (chest), subscapular (under the scapula), and humeral (humerus-bone area) lymph-node groups, which drain to the central axillary lymph nodes and to the apical axillary lymph nodes. The lymphatic drainage of the breasts is especially relevant to oncology because breast cancer is common to the mammary gland, and cancer cells can metastasize (break away) from a tumor and be dispersed to other parts of the body by means of the lymphatic system.

=== Morphology ===
The morphologic variations in the size, shape, volume, tissue density, pectoral locale, and spacing of the breasts determine their natural shape, appearance, and position on a woman's chest. Breast size and other characteristics do not predict the fat-to-milk-gland ratio or the potential for the woman to nurse an infant. The size and the shape of the breasts are influenced by normal-life hormonal changes (thelarche, menstruation, pregnancy, menopause) and medical conditions (e.g. breast hypertrophy). The shape of the breasts is naturally determined by the support of the suspensory Cooper's ligaments, the underlying muscle and bone structures of the chest, and by the skin envelope. The suspensory ligaments sustain the breast from the clavicle (collarbone) and the clavico-pectoral fascia (collarbone and chest) by traversing and encompassing the fat and milk-gland tissues. The breast is positioned, affixed to, and supported upon the chest wall, while its shape is established and maintained by the skin envelope. In most women, one breast is slightly larger than the other. More obvious and persistent asymmetry in breast size occurs in up to 25% of women.

The base of each breast is attached to the chest by the deep fascia over the pectoralis major muscles. The base of the breast is semi-circular, however the shape and position of the breast above the surface is variable. The space between the breast and the pectoralis major muscle, called retromammary space, gives mobility to the breast. The chest (thoracic cavity) progressively slopes outwards from the thoracic inlet (atop the breastbone) and above to the lowest ribs that support the breasts. The inframammary fold (IMF), where the lower portion of the breast meets the chest, is an anatomic feature created by the adherence of the breast skin and the underlying connective tissues of the chest; the IMF is the lower-most extent of the anatomic breast. Normal breast tissue has a texture that feels nodular or granular, with considerable variation from woman to woman.

Breasts have been categorized into four general morphological groups: "flat, spheric, protruded, and drooped", or "small/flat, large/inward, upward, and droopy".

==== Support ====
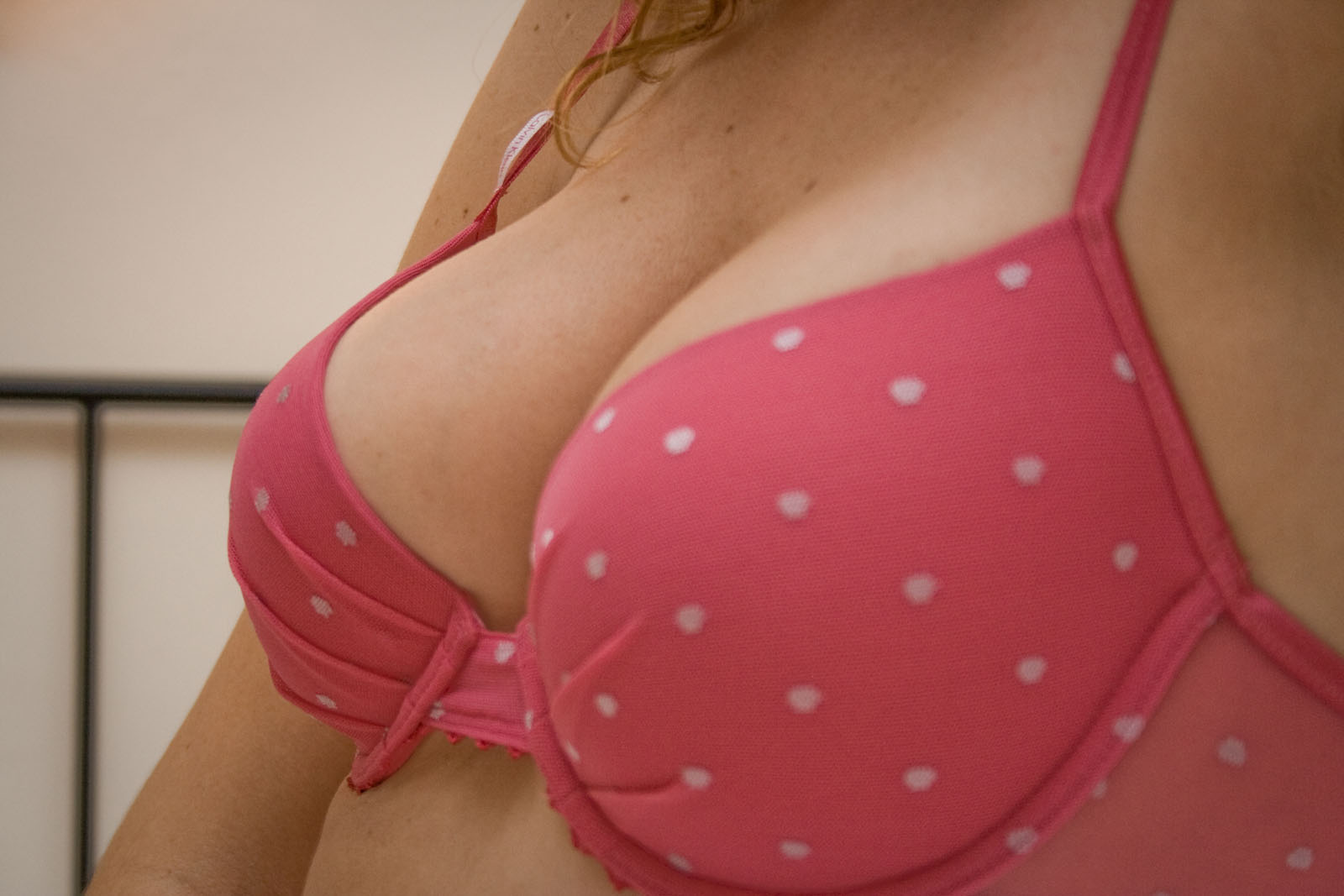
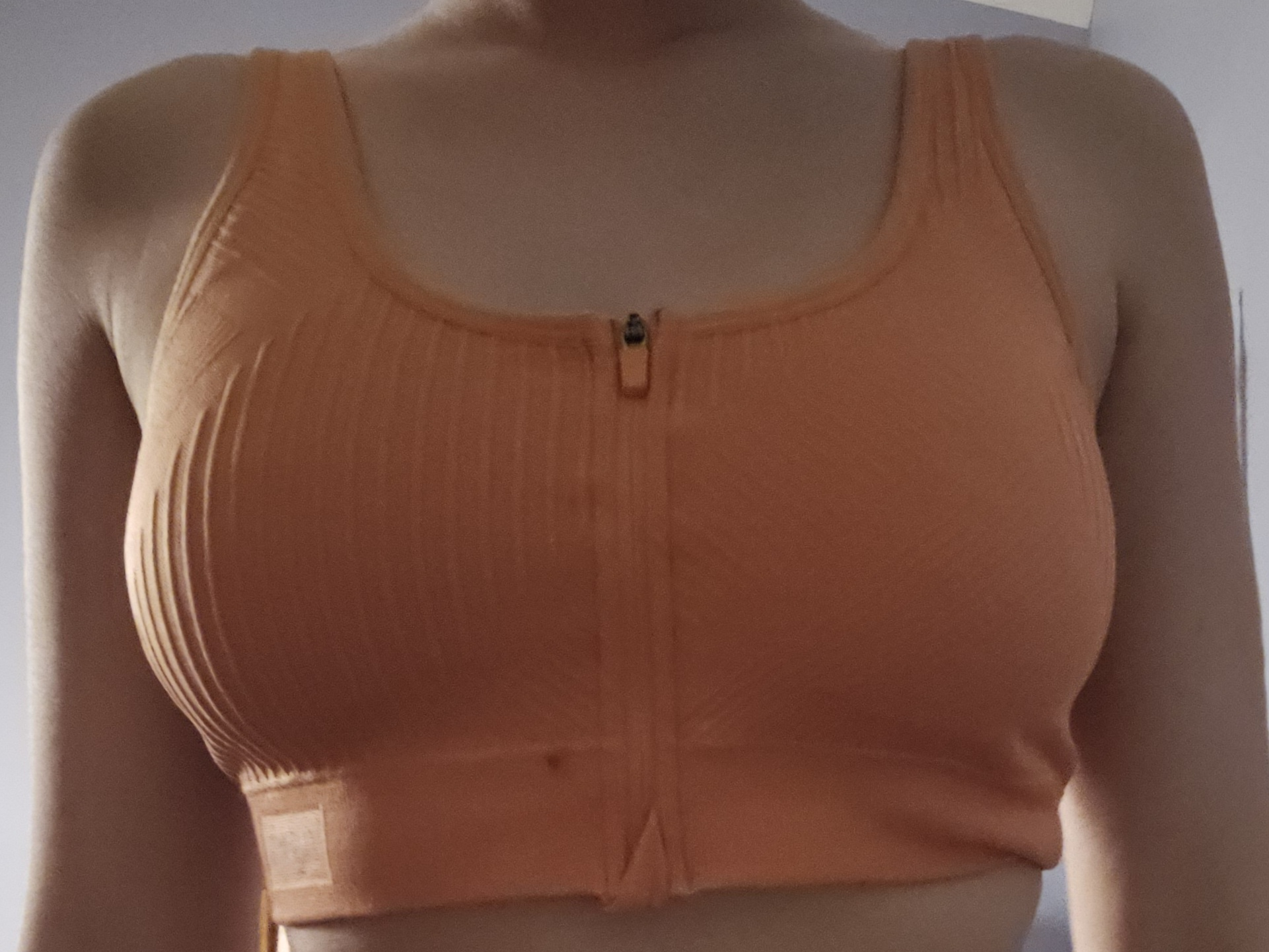
Left: Underwire bra. Right: Sports bra

While it is a common belief that breastfeeding causes breasts to sag, researchers have found that a woman's breasts sag due to four key factors: cigarette smoking, number of pregnancies, gravity, and weight loss or gain. Women sometimes wear bras because they mistakenly believe they prevent breasts from sagging as they get older. Physicians, lingerie retailers, teenagers, and adult women used to believe that bras were medically required to support breasts. In a 1952 article in Parents' Magazine, Frank H. Crowell erroneously reported that it was important for teen girls to begin wearing bras early. According to Crowell, this would prevent sagging breasts, stretched blood vessels, and poor circulation later on. This belief was based on the false idea that breasts cannot anatomically support themselves.

Sports bras are sometimes used for cardiovascular exercise, sports bras are designed to secure the breasts closely to the body to prevent movement during high-motion activity such as running. Studies have indicated sports bras which are overly tight may restrict respiratory function.

== Development ==
The breasts are principally composed of adipose, glandular, and connective tissues. Because these tissues have hormone receptors, their sizes and volumes fluctuate according to the hormonal changes particular to thelarche (sprouting of breasts), menstruation (egg production), pregnancy (reproduction), lactation (feeding of offspring), and menopause (end of menstruation).

=== Puberty ===
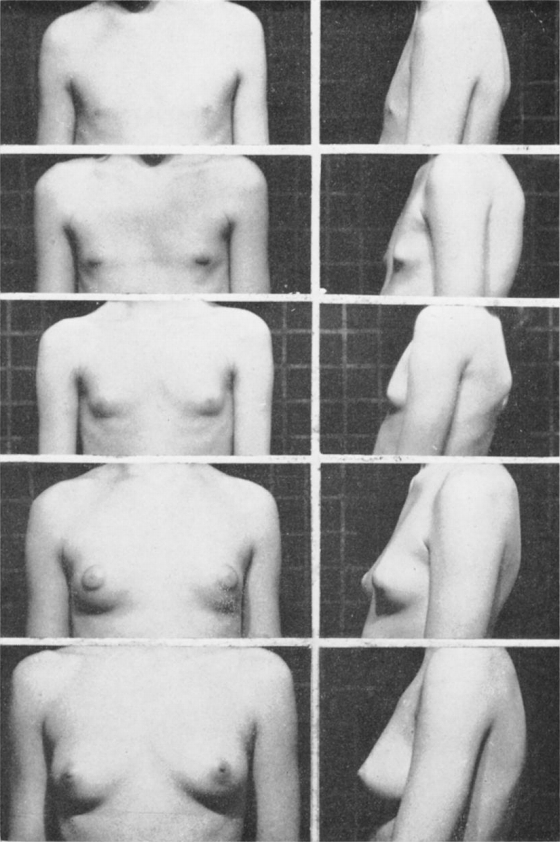
Breast development in puberty is measured with the five-stage Tanner scale

The morphological structure of the human breast is identical in males and females until puberty. For pubescent girls in thelarche (the breast-development stage), the female sex hormones (principally estrogens) in conjunction with growth hormone promote the sprouting, growth, and development of the breasts. During this time, the mammary glands grow in size and volume and begin resting on the chest. These development stages of secondary sex characteristics (breasts, pubic hair, etc.) are illustrated in the five-stage Tanner scale.

During thelarche, the developing breasts are sometimes of unequal size, and usually the left breast is slightly larger. This condition of asymmetry is transitory and statistically normal in female physical and sexual development. Medical conditions can cause overdevelopment (e.g., juvenile breast hypertrophy, macromastia) or underdevelopment (e.g., tuberous breast deformity, micromastia) in girls and women.

Approximately two years after the onset of puberty (a girl's first menstrual cycle), estrogen and growth hormone stimulate the development and growth of the glandular fat and suspensory tissues that compose the breast. This continues for approximately four years until the final shape of the breast (size, volume, density) is established at about the age of 21. Mammoplasia (breast enlargement) in girls begins at puberty, unlike all other primates, in which breasts enlarge only during lactation.

=== Hormone replacement therapy ===
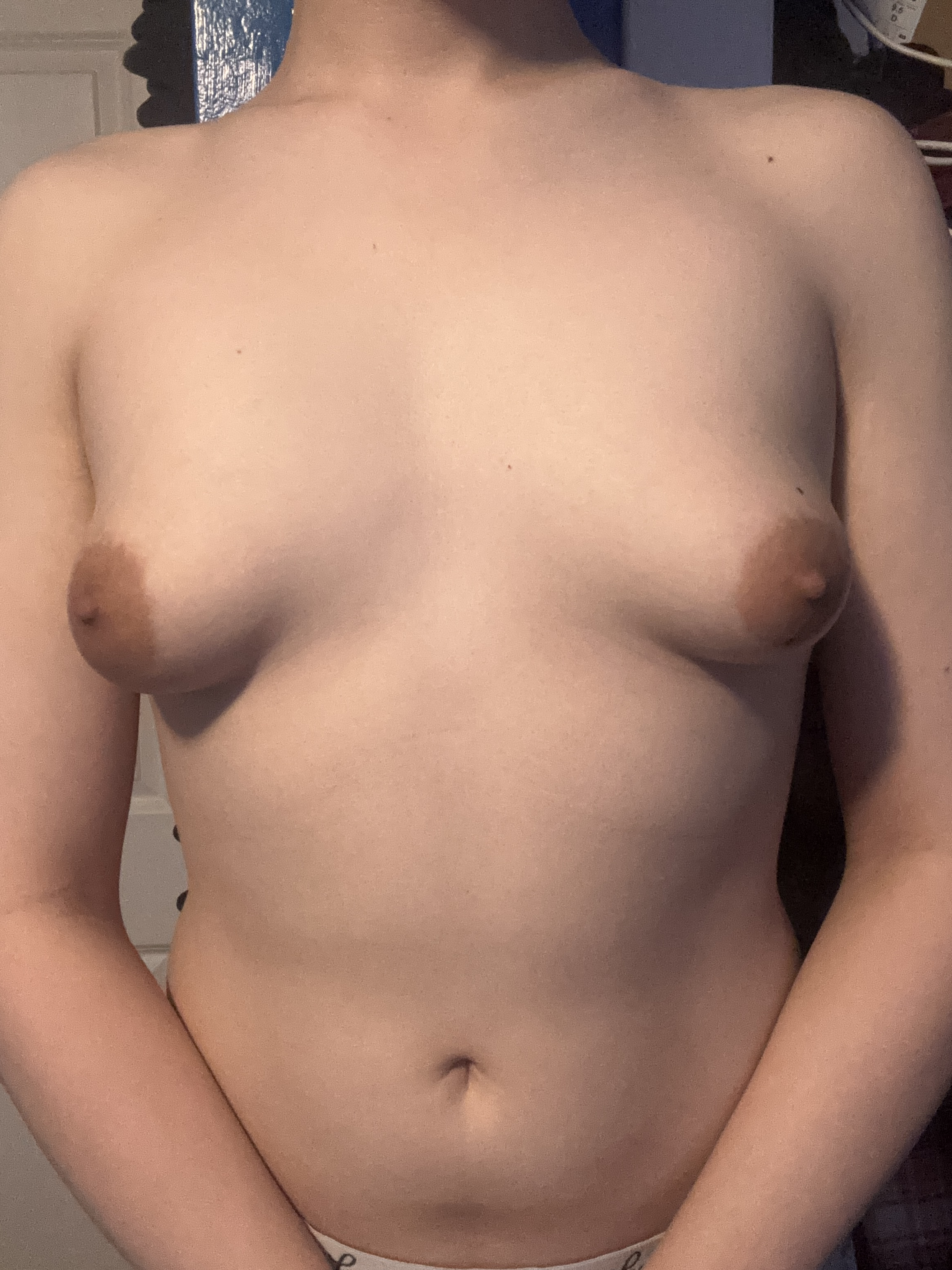
A transgender woman with HRT-induced developed breasts

Hormone replacement therapy, including gender-affirming hormone therapy, stimulates the growth of glandular and adipose tissue through estrogen supplementation.

In menopausal women, HRT helps restore breast volume and skin elasticity diminished by declining estrogen levels, typically using oral or transdermal estradiol.

In gender-affirming hormone therapy, breast development is induced through feminizing HRT, often combining estrogen with anti-androgens to suppress testosterone. Maximum growth is usually achieved after 2–3 years.

Factors such as age, genetics, and hormone dosage influence outcomes.

=== Changes during the menstrual cycle ===
During the menstrual cycle, the breasts are enlarged by premenstrual water retention and temporary growth as influenced by changing hormone levels.

=== Pregnancy and breastfeeding ===
The breasts reach full maturity only when a woman's first pregnancy occurs. Changes to the breasts are among the first signs of pregnancy. The breasts become larger, the nipple-areola complex becomes larger and darker, the Montgomery's glands enlarge, and veins sometimes become more visible. Breast tenderness during pregnancy is common, especially during the first trimester. By mid-pregnancy, the breast is physiologically capable of lactation and some women can express colostrum, a form of breast milk.

Pregnancy causes elevated levels of the hormone prolactin, which has a key role in the production of milk. However, milk production is blocked by the hormones progesterone and estrogen until after delivery, when progesterone and estrogen levels plummet.

=== Menopause ===
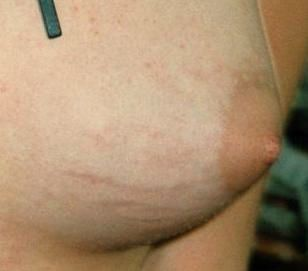
Breast with visible stretch marks

At menopause, breast atrophy occurs. The breasts can decrease in size when the levels of circulating estrogen decline. The adipose tissue and milk glands also begin to wither. The breasts can also become enlarged from adverse side effects of combined oral contraceptive pills. The size of the breasts can also increase and decrease in response to weight fluctuations.

Physical changes to the breasts are often recorded in the stretch marks of the skin envelope; they can serve as historical indicators of the increments and the decrements of the size and volume of a woman's breasts throughout the course of her life.

Breast changes during menopause are sometimes treated with hormone replacement therapy.

== Breastfeeding ==
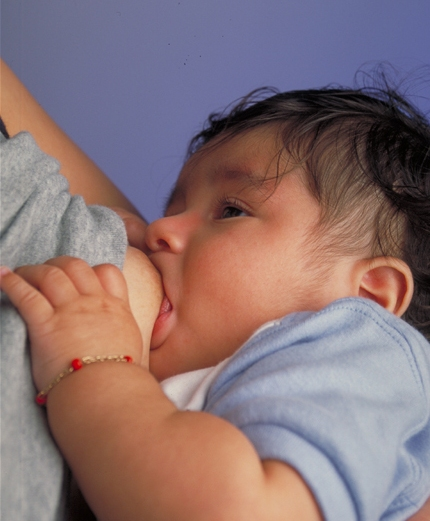
An infant being breastfed

The primary function of the breasts, as mammary glands, is the nourishing of an infant with breast milk. Milk is produced in milk-secreting cells in the alveoli. When the breasts are stimulated by the suckling of her baby, the mother's brain secretes oxytocin. High levels of oxytocin trigger the contraction of muscle cells surrounding the alveoli, causing milk to flow along the ducts that connect the alveoli to the nipple.

Full-term newborns have an instinct and a need to suck on a nipple, and breastfed babies nurse for both nutrition and for comfort. Breast milk provides all necessary nutrients for the first six months of life, and then remains an important source of nutrition, alongside solid foods, until at least one or two years of age.

== Exercise ==
Biomechanical studies have demonstrated that, depending on the activity and the size of a woman's breast, when she walks or runs braless, her breasts may move up and down by 4 to 18 centimetres (1.6 to 7.1 in) or more, and also oscillate side to side. Researchers have also found that as women's breast size increased, they took part in less physical activity, especially vigorous exercise. Few very-large-breasted women jogged, for example. To avoid exercise-related discomfort and pain, medical experts suggest women wear a well-fitted sports bra during activity.

== Clinical significance ==
The breast is susceptible to numerous benign and malignant conditions. The most frequent benign conditions are puerperal mastitis, fibrocystic breast changes and mastalgia.

Lactation unrelated to pregnancy is known as galactorrhea. It can be caused by certain drugs (such as antipsychotic medications), extreme physical stress, or endocrine disorders. Lactation in newborns is caused by hormones from the mother that crossed into the baby's bloodstream during pregnancy.

=== Breast cancer ===
Breast cancer, which develops from breast tissue, is the most common cause of cancer death among women and a leading cause of general death among women. Factors that appear to be implicated in decreasing the risk of breast cancer are regular breast examinations by health care professionals, regular mammograms, self-examination of breasts, healthy diet, exercise to decrease excess body fat, and breastfeeding.

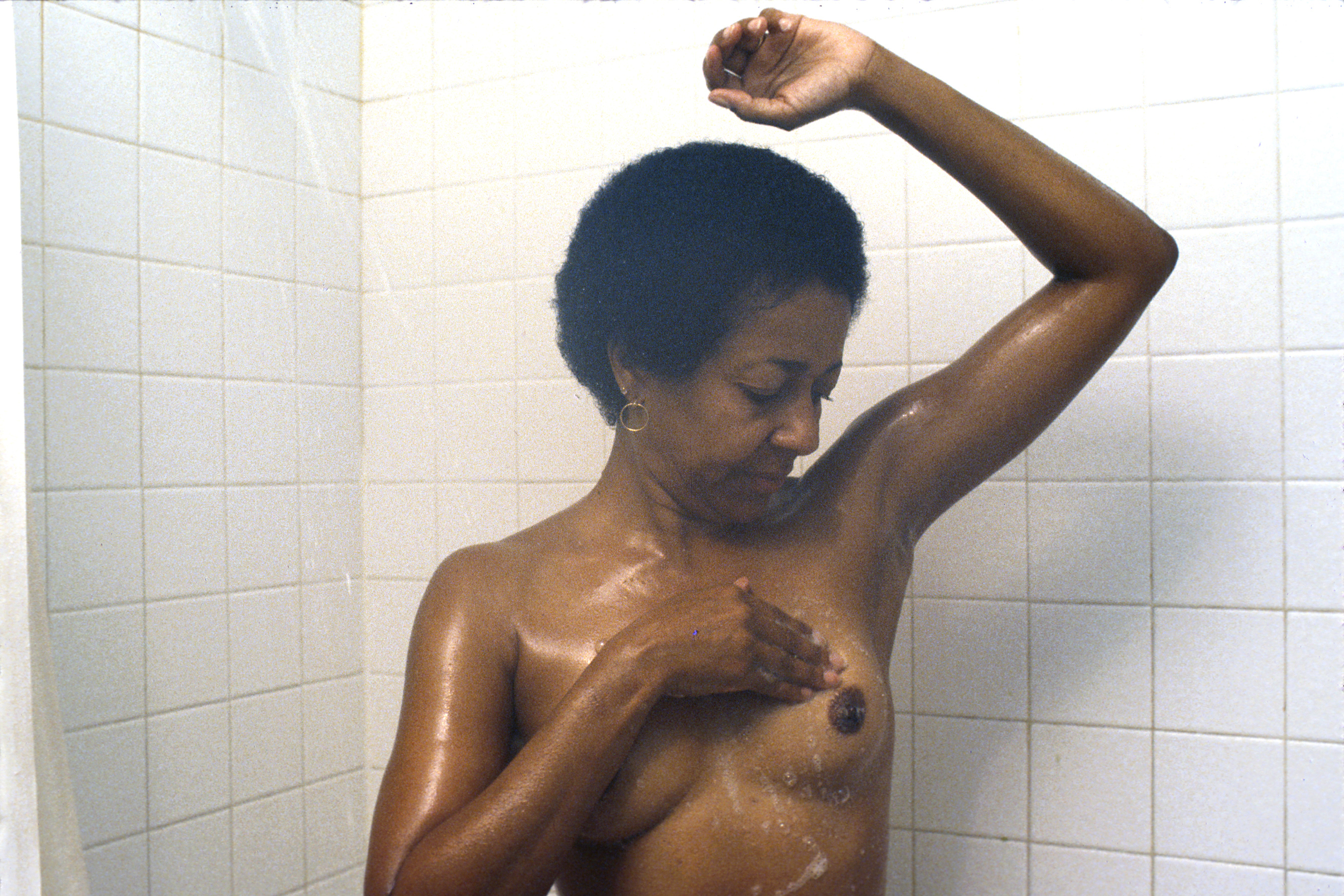
Woman performing a breast self examination to screen for cancer

Signs of breast cancer may include a lump in the breast, a change in breast shape, dimpling of the skin, milk rejection, fluid coming from the nipple, a newly inverted nipple, or a red or scaly patch of skin. In those with distant spread of the disease, there may be bone pain, swollen lymph nodes, shortness of breath, or yellow skin.

Risk factors for developing breast cancer include obesity, a lack of physical exercise, alcohol consumption, hormone replacement therapy during menopause, ionizing radiation, an early age at first menstruation, having children late in life (or not at all), older age, having a prior history of breast cancer, and a family history of breast cancer. About five to ten percent of cases are the result of an inherited genetic predisposition, including BRCA mutations among others. Breast cancer most commonly develops in cells from the lining of milk ducts and the lobules that supply these ducts with milk. Cancers developing from the ducts are known as ductal carcinomas, while those developing from lobules are known as lobular carcinomas. There are more than 18 other sub-types of breast cancer. Some, such as ductal carcinoma in situ, develop from pre-invasive lesions. The diagnosis of breast cancer is confirmed by taking a biopsy of the concerning tissue. Once the diagnosis is made, further tests are carried out to determine if the cancer has spread beyond the breast and which treatments are most likely to be effective.

=== Male breasts ===
Both females and males develop breasts from the same embryological tissues. Anatomically, male breasts do not normally contain lobules and acini that are present in females. In rare instances, it is possible for very few lobules to be present; this makes it possible for some men to develop lobular carcinoma of the breast. Normally, males produce lower levels of estrogens and higher levels of androgens, namely testosterone, which suppress the effects of estrogens in developing excessive breast tissue. In boys and men, abnormal breast development is manifested as gynecomastia, the consequence of a biochemical imbalance between the normal levels of estrogen and testosterone in the male body. Around 70% of boys temporarily develop breast tissue during adolescence. The condition usually resolves by itself within two years. When male lactation occurs, it is considered a symptom of a disorder of the pituitary gland.

=== Plastic surgery ===
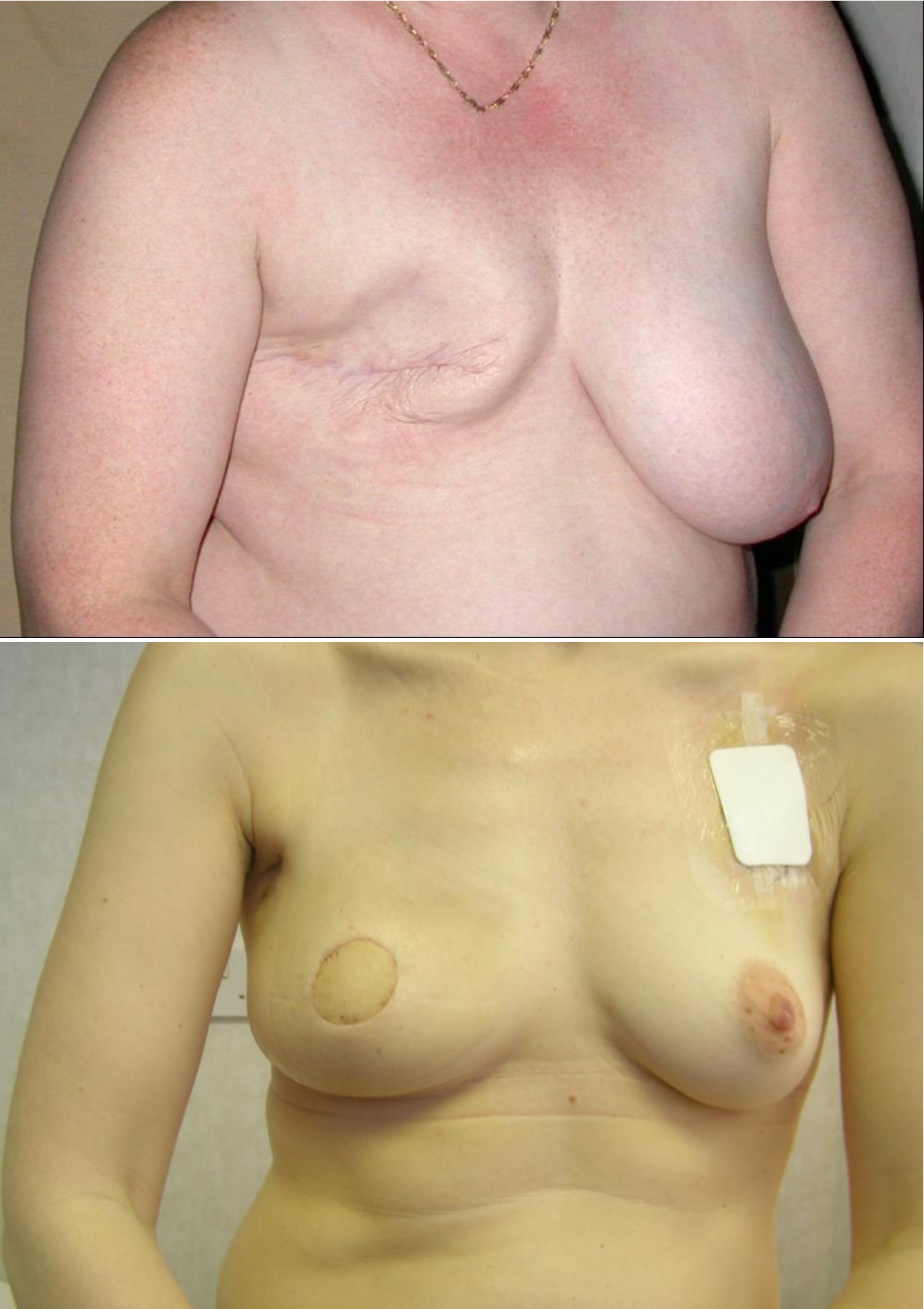
Conventional mastectomy (top); skin sparing mastectomy and latissimus dorsi myocutaneous flap reconstruction, prior to nipple reconstruction and tattooing (bottom)

Plastic surgery can be performed to augment or reduce the size of breasts, or to reconstruct the breast in cases of deformative disease, such as breast cancer. Breast augmentation and breast lift (mastopexy) procedures are done only for cosmetic reasons, whereas breast reduction is sometimes medically indicated. In cases where a woman's breasts are severely asymmetrical, surgery can be performed to either enlarge the smaller breast, reduce the size of the larger breast, or both.

Breast augmentation surgery generally does not interfere with future ability to breastfeed. Breast reduction surgery more frequently leads to decreased sensation in the nipple-areola complex, and to low milk supply in women who choose to breastfeed. Implants can interfere with mammography (breast x-ray images).

== Society and culture ==
=== General ===
In Christian iconography, some works of art depict women with their breasts in their hands or on a platter, signifying that they died as a martyr by having their breasts severed; one example of this is Saint Agatha of Sicily.

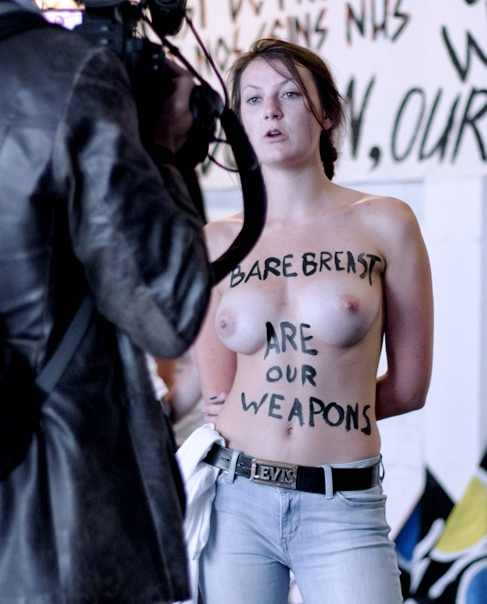
Femen member participating in a protest

Femen is a feminist activist group which uses topless protests as part of their campaigns against sex tourism, religious institutions, sexism, and homophobia. Femen activists have been regularly detained by police in response to their protests.

There is a long history of female breasts being used by comedians as a subject for comedy fodder (e.g., British comic Benny Hill's burlesque/slapstick routines).

=== Art history ===
In European pre-historic societies, sculptures of female figures with pronounced or highly exaggerated breasts were common. A typical example is the so-called Venus of Willendorf, one of many Paleolithic Venus figurines with ample hips and bosom. Artifacts such as bowls, rock carvings and sacred statues with breasts have been recorded from 15,000 BC up to late antiquity all across Europe, North Africa and the Middle East.

Many female deities representing love and fertility were associated with breasts and breast milk. Figures of the Phoenician goddess Astarte were represented as pillars studded with breasts. Isis, an Egyptian goddess who represented, among many other things, ideal motherhood, was often portrayed as suckling pharaohs, thereby confirming their divine status as rulers. Even certain male deities representing regeneration and fertility were occasionally depicted with breast-like appendices, such as the river god Hapy who was considered to be responsible for the annual overflowing of the Nile.

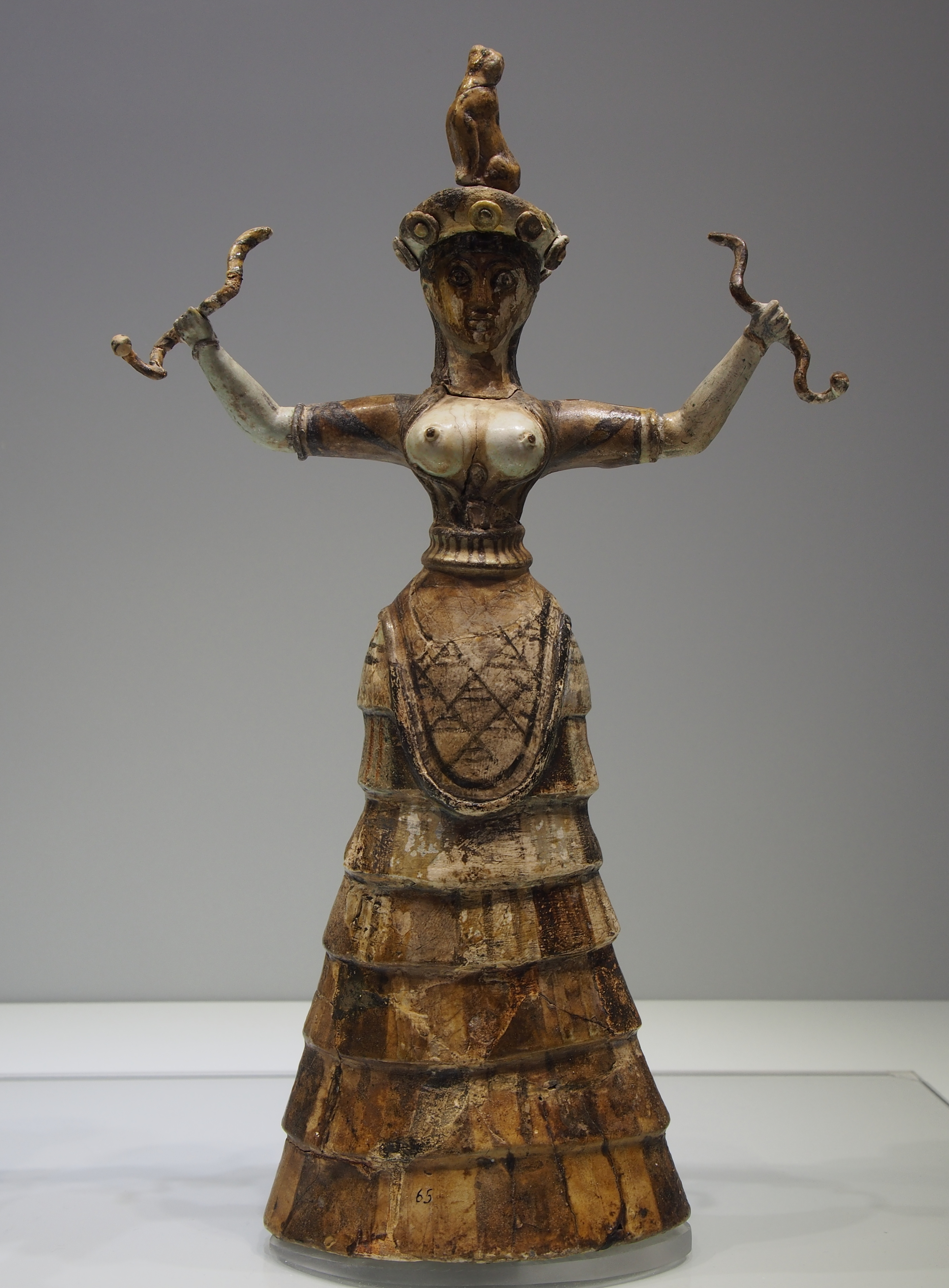
A Cretan snake goddess from the Minoan civilization, c. 1600 BC

Female breasts were also prominent in Minoan art in the form of the famous Snake Goddess statuettes, and a few other pieces, though most female breasts are covered. In Ancient Greece there were several cults worshipping the "Kourotrophos", the suckling mother, represented by goddesses such as Gaia, Hera and Artemis. The worship of deities symbolized by the female breast in Greece became less common during the first millennium. The popular adoration of female goddesses decreased significantly during the rise of the Greek city states, a legacy which was passed on to the later Roman Empire.

During the middle of the first millennium BC, Greek culture experienced a gradual change in the perception of female breasts. Women in art were covered in clothing from the neck down, including female goddesses like Athena, the patron of Athens who represented heroic endeavor. There were exceptions: Aphrodite, the goddess of love, was more frequently portrayed fully nude, though in postures that were intended to portray shyness or modesty, a portrayal that has been compared to modern pin ups by historian Marilyn Yalom. Although nude men were depicted standing upright, most depictions of female nudity in Greek art occurred "usually with drapery near at hand and with a forward-bending, self-protecting posture". A popular legend at the time was of the Amazons, a tribe of fierce female warriors who socialized with men only for procreation and even removed one breast to become better warriors (the idea being that the right breast would interfere with the operation of a bow and arrow). The legend was a popular motif in art during Greek and Roman antiquity and served as an antithetical cautionary tale.

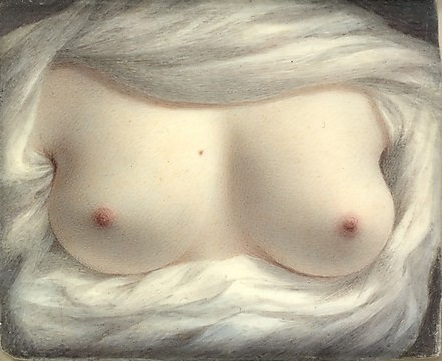
Beauty Revealed, 1828 self-portrait by the American artist Sarah Goodridge

=== Body image ===
Many women regard their breasts as important to their sexual attractiveness, as a sign of femininity that is important to their sense of self. A woman with smaller breasts may regard her breasts as less attractive.

=== Clothing ===
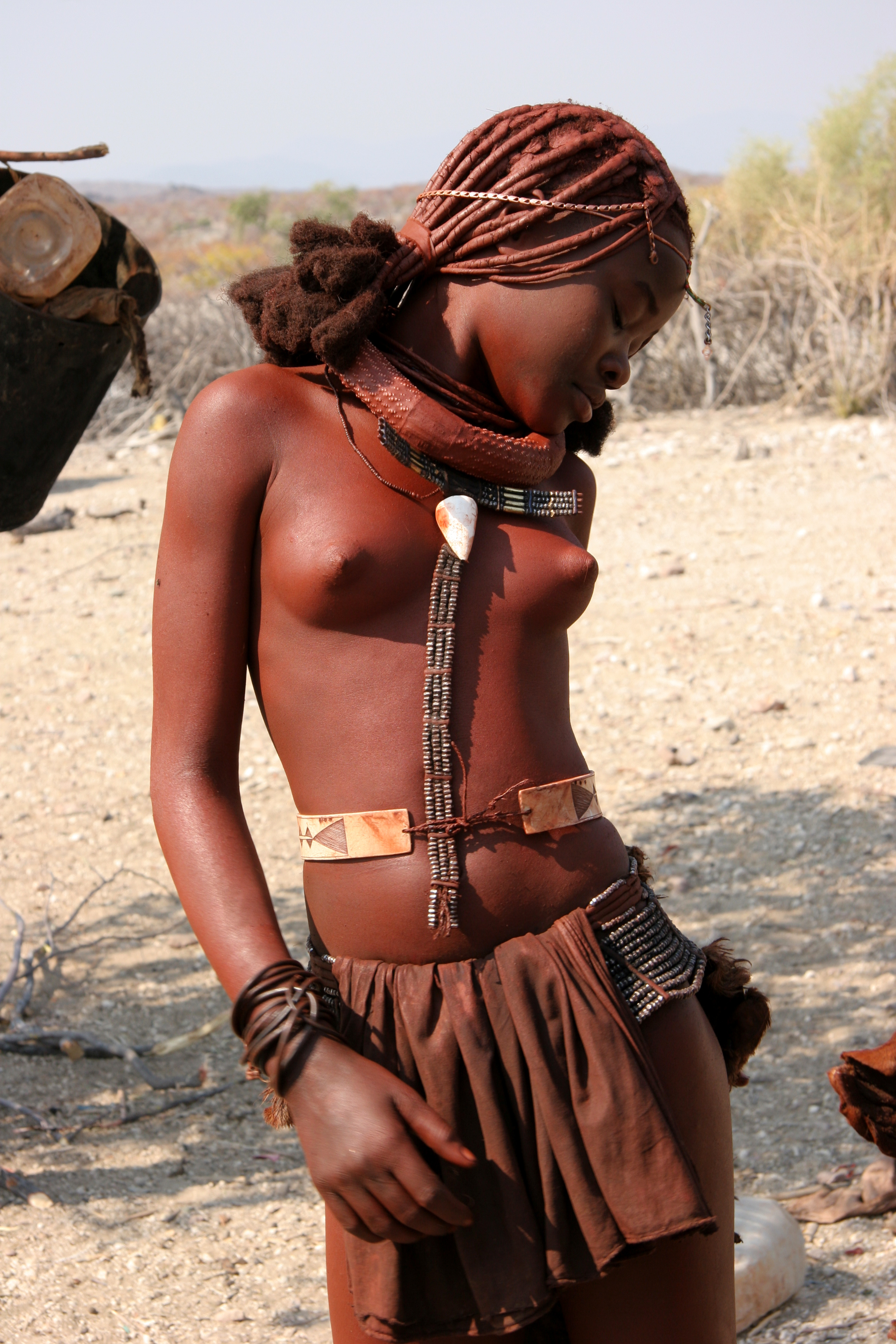
A bare-breasted Himba woman of northern Namibia wears a traditional headdress and skirt.

Because breasts are mostly fatty tissue, their shape can—within limits—be molded by clothing, such as foundation garments. Bras are commonly worn by about 90% of Western women, and are often worn for support. The social norm in most Western cultures is to cover breasts in public, though the extent of coverage varies depending on the social context. Some religions ascribe a special status to the female breast, either in formal teachings or through symbolism. Islam forbids free women from exposing their breasts in public.

Many cultures, including Western cultures in North America, associate breasts with sexuality and tend to regard bare breasts as immodest or indecent. In some cultures, like the Himba in northern Namibia, bare-breasted women are normal. In some African cultures, for example, the thigh is regarded as highly sexualized and never exposed in public, but breast exposure is not taboo. In a few Western countries and regions female toplessness at a beach is acceptable, although it may not be acceptable in the town center.

Social attitudes and laws regarding breastfeeding in public vary widely. In many countries, breastfeeding in public is common, legally protected, and generally not regarded as an issue. However, even though the practice may be legal or socially accepted, some mothers may nevertheless be reluctant to expose a breast in public to breastfeed due to actual or potential objections by other people, negative comments, or harassment. It is estimated that around 63% of mothers across the world have publicly breast-fed. Bare-breasted women are legal and culturally acceptable at public beaches in Australia and much of Europe. Filmmaker Lina Esco made a film entitled Free the Nipple, which is about "...laws against female toplessness or restrictions on images of female, but not male, nipples", which Esco states is an example of sexism in society.

Breast binding, also known as chest binding, is the flattening and hiding of breasts with constrictive materials such as cloth strips or purpose-built undergarments. Binders may also be used as alternatives to bras or for reasons of propriety. People who bind include women, trans men, non-binary people, and cisgender men with gynecomastia.

=== Sexual characteristic ===
In some cultures, breasts play a role in human sexual activity. Breasts and especially the nipples are among the various human erogenous zones. They are sensitive to the touch as they have many nerve endings; and it is common to press or massage them with hands or orally before or during sexual activity. During sexual arousal, breast size increases, venous patterns across the breasts become more visible, and nipples harden. Compared to other primates, human breasts are proportionately large throughout adult females' lives. Some writers have suggested that they may have evolved as a visual signal of sexual maturity and fertility. In Patterns of Sexual Behavior, a 1951 analysis of 191 traditional cultures, the researchers noted that stimulation of the female breast by a male sexual partner "seemed absent in all subhuman forms, although it is common among the members of many different human societies."

Many people regard bare female breasts to be aesthetically pleasing or erotic, and they can elicit heightened sexual desires in men in many cultures. In the ancient Indian work the Kama Sutra, light scratching of the breasts with nails and biting with teeth are considered erotic. Some people show a sexual interest in female breasts distinct from that of the person, which may be regarded as a breast fetish. A number of Western fashions include clothing which accentuate the breasts, such as the use of push-up bras and decollete (plunging neckline) gowns and blouses which show cleavage. While U.S. culture prefers breasts that are youthful and upright, some cultures venerate women with drooping breasts, indicating mothering and the wisdom of experience.

Research conducted at the Victoria University of Wellington showed that breasts are often the first thing men look at, and for a longer time than other body parts. The writers of the study had initially speculated that the reason for this is due to endocrinology with larger breasts indicating higher levels of estrogen and a sign of greater fertility, but the researchers said that "Men may be looking more often at the breasts because they are simply aesthetically pleasing, regardless of the size."

Some women report achieving an orgasm from nipple stimulation, but this is rare. Research suggests that the orgasms are genital orgasms, and may also be directly linked to "the genital area of the brain". In these cases, it seems that sensation from the nipples travels to the same part of the brain as sensations from the vagina, clitoris and cervix. Nipple stimulation may trigger uterine contractions, which then produce a sensation in the genital area of the brain.

=== Anthropomorphic geography ===
There are many mountains named after the breast because they resemble it in appearance and so are objects of religious and ancestral veneration as a fertility symbol and of well-being. In Asia, there was "Breast Mountain", which had a cave where the Buddhist monk Bodhidharma (Da Mo) spent much time in meditation. Other such breast mountains are Mount Elgon on the Uganda–Kenya border; Beinn Chìochan and the Maiden Paps in Scotland; the Bundok ng Susong Dalaga ('Maiden's breast mountains') in Talim Island, Philippines, the twin hills known as the Paps of Anu (Dá Chích Anann or 'the breasts of Anu'), near Killarney in Ireland; the 2,086 m high Tetica de Bacares or La Tetica in the Sierra de Los Filabres, Spain; Khao Nom Sao in Thailand, Cerro Las Tetas in Puerto Rico; and the Breasts of Aphrodite in Mykonos, among many others. In the United States, the Teton Range is named after the French word for 'nipple'.

== Measurement ==
The maturation and size of the breasts can be measured by a variety of different methods. These include Tanner staging, bra cup size, breast volume, breast–chest difference, the breast unit, breast hemicircumference, and breast circumference, among other measures.

== See also ==
- Udder
