= Breast measurement =

For size, shape, or developmental state

Breast measurement involves the measurement of the breasts for quantifying physical characteristics such as size, shape, and developmental state. A variety of different approaches have been employed for measuring the breasts.

== Tanner staging ==
The Tanner scale for measuring breast maturation during puberty.

Tanner staging can be used to assess the developmental state of the breasts during puberty, from childhood (Tanner stage 1) to adulthood (Tanner stage 5).

== Breast volume ==
Breast volume is a method of measuring the size of the breasts. A variety of techniques have been used to measure breast volume, including water displacement, plaster casting, medical imaging (e.g., mammography, magnetic resonance imaging (MRI), ultrasound), and 3D scanning. There is substantial measurement error with many breast volume measures, but MRI imaging appears to have among the lowest error and hence to be the most accurate measure. However, 3D scanning might have the potential to become the new gold standard for clinical assessment. A limitation of 3D scanning is inaccuracy in the case of large and/or ptotic.

In a normative study of breast volumes in cisgender women using 3D scanning, breast volumes were median 515 mL, mean 650 mL, interquartile range 310 to 850 mL, and range ~50 to 3,100 mL. In transgender women, breast volume measured with 3D scanning has been reported to reach a plateau of around 100 mL (but with an apparent range of up to 750 mL) after 3 to 4 years of hormone therapy.

Breast volume has also been assessed with the BreastIdea Volume Estimator (BIVE), a freely available web application that uses user-provided photographs and anthropometric measurements to calculate estimations of breast volume. It has been studied and validated in cisgender women and men, women with macromastia or gigantomastia, and transgender women. Average breast volumes have been reported to be 272 to 283 mL (range 99–694 mL in one study) in cisgender women, 888 mL in women with macromastia or gigantomastia, and 158 to 190 mL (range 20–788 mL) in transgender women after 6 months of hormone therapy. The resolution and accuracy of the BIVE is less than with 3D scanners.

== Breast circumference ==
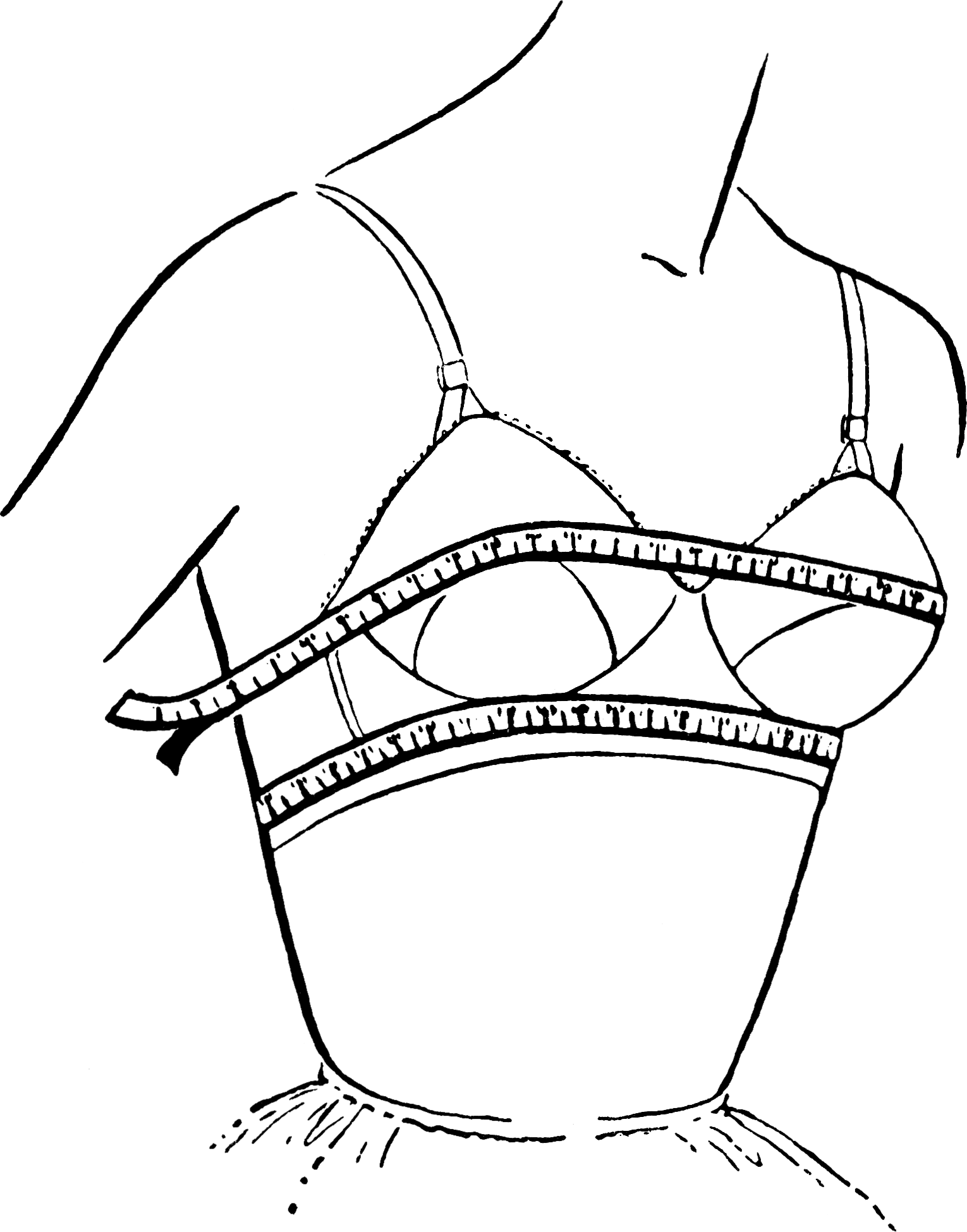
The upper tape measure is breast circumference and the lower tape measure is underbust circumference.

Breast circumference, also known as bust circumference, is a measurement of the circumference of the torso at the level of the breasts. It has been used as a measure of breast size in normal young women, in women with pregnancy, and in transgender women. Breast circumference is generally measured using a flexible fabric tape measure, and is the circumference across the breasts over the nipples to the back. The breast–chest difference is breast circumference minus band or underbust circumference and is used in the determination of bra cup size.

== Breast–chest difference ==
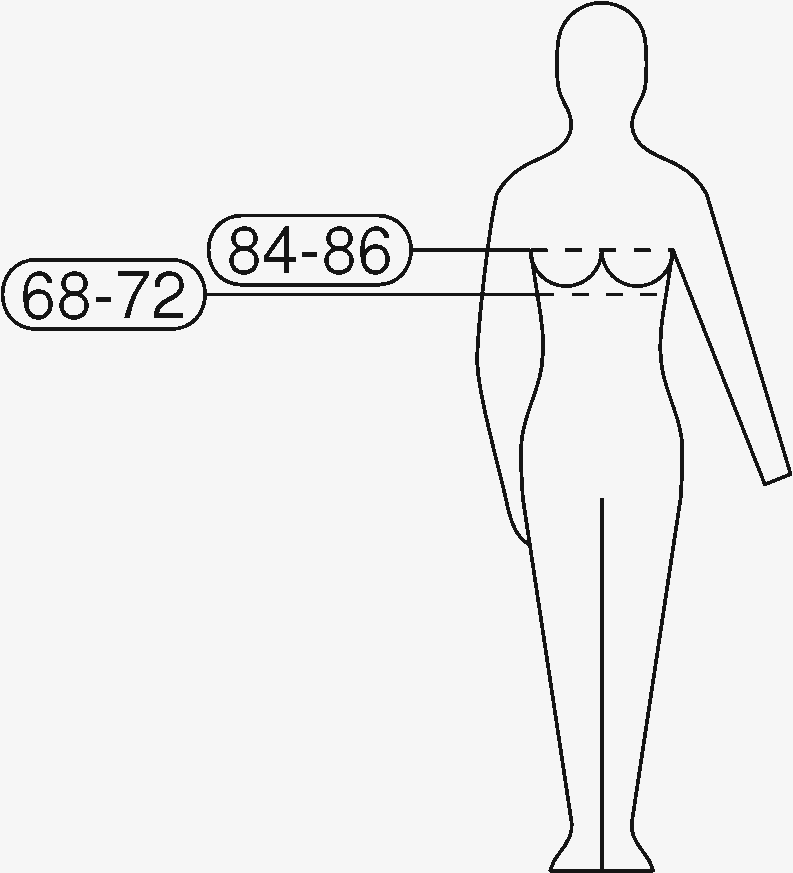
Breast–chest difference is the difference of the breast circumference (upper line) and the underbust circumference (lower line).

Breast–chest difference, also known as bust–band difference, is a measurement used for quantifying breast size. It is calculated as bust circumference minus the band or underbust circumference. Breast–chest difference has been used in the measurement of breast development in transgender women on feminizing hormone therapy.

== Breast hemicircumference ==
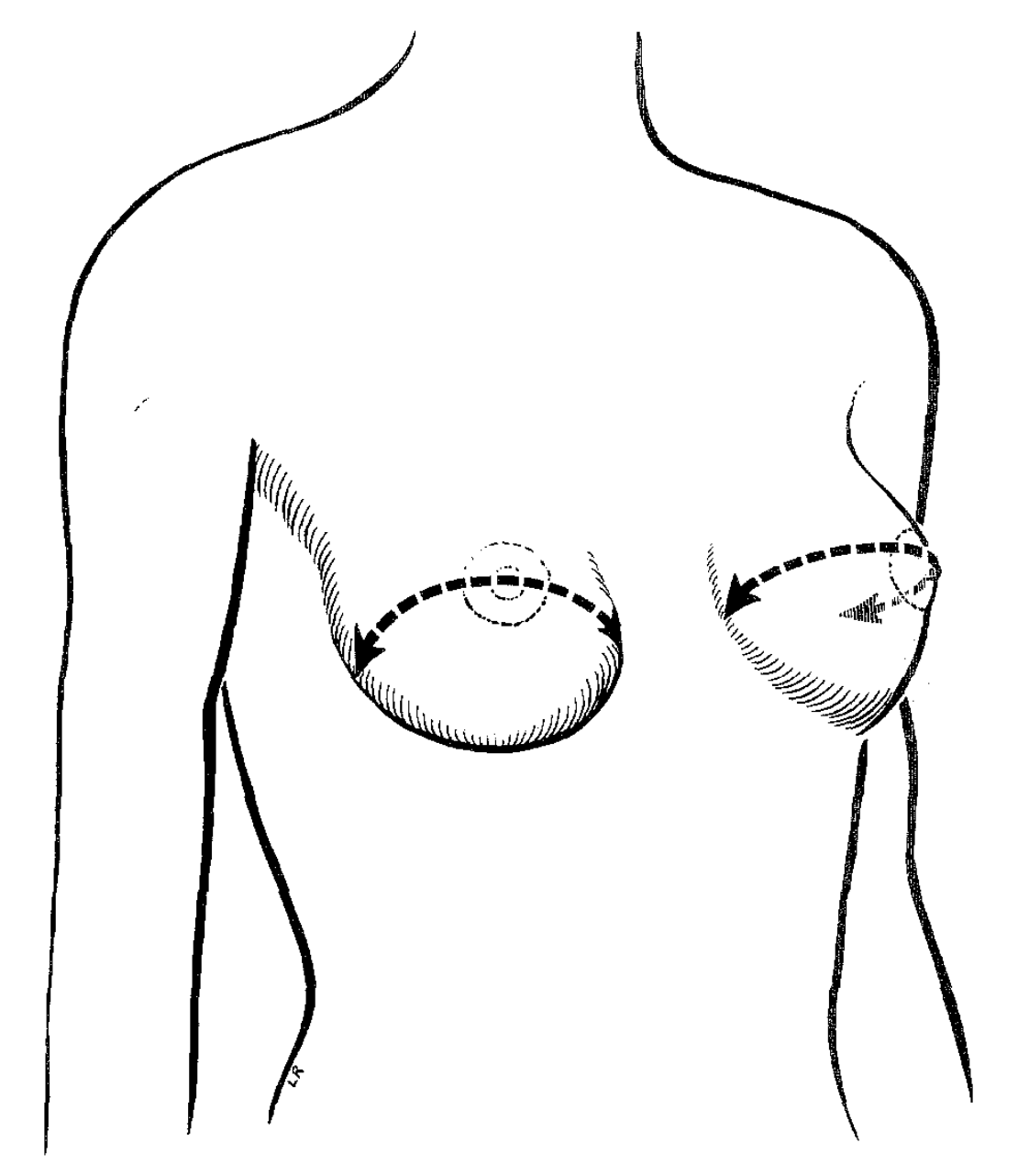
Measurement of breast hemicircumference.

Breast hemicircumference, also sometimes referred to as breast width or as breast circumference (incorrectly), is an anthropometric measure of the breasts which has been used in studies to assess breast development and breast size, including in transgender women. It is the medial horizontal length (measured with a flexible tape measure) from one side of the breast to the other side and running over the nipple. A measurement of 7 inches is said to correspond to an A cup, 8 inches to a B cup, 9 inches to a C cup, and so on, with each further 1-inch increment or decrement corresponding to one cup size up or down.

== Breast unit ==
The breast unit is a measurement of the breasts in which the breasts are measured horizontally and vertically and then these values are multiplied to given an overall idea of breast size. It was devised by Vincent J. Capraro and has been used in pediatric endocrinology to quantify breast development. The method has been described as follows:

At times it is desirable to know whether or not a girl's breasts are developing normally by observing their increasing size over a period of several months. In some cases it is also advantageous to determine whether or not differences in the sizes of the two breasts are of clinical significance. In order to more accurately measure breast size, one of us (V.J.C.) devised a technique for breast measurement. This technique may be used in following up the development of normal breasts as well as of breasts showing asymmetric development. With a centimeter tape measure, the breast is measured from 3 o'clock to 9 o'clock (Fig. 23-4, A) and from 12 o'clock to 6 o'clock (Fig. 23-4, B). These two measurements are multiplied, yielding a figure called the breast unit. Table 23-3 shows the typical spread of breast units in a normal adolescent.

The breast unit has also been used to quantify breast size in girls and women with complete androgen insensitivity syndrome (CAIS) and other individuals with disorders of sexual development. It can also be reported unmultiplied (e.g., 16×14 cm to 41×31 cm in CAIS women).

== Other breast measurements ==
Other measurements of the breasts, like areolar diameter, can also be determined.
