= Namtok Ngao National Park =

National park in Thailand

- IUCN category II (national park)
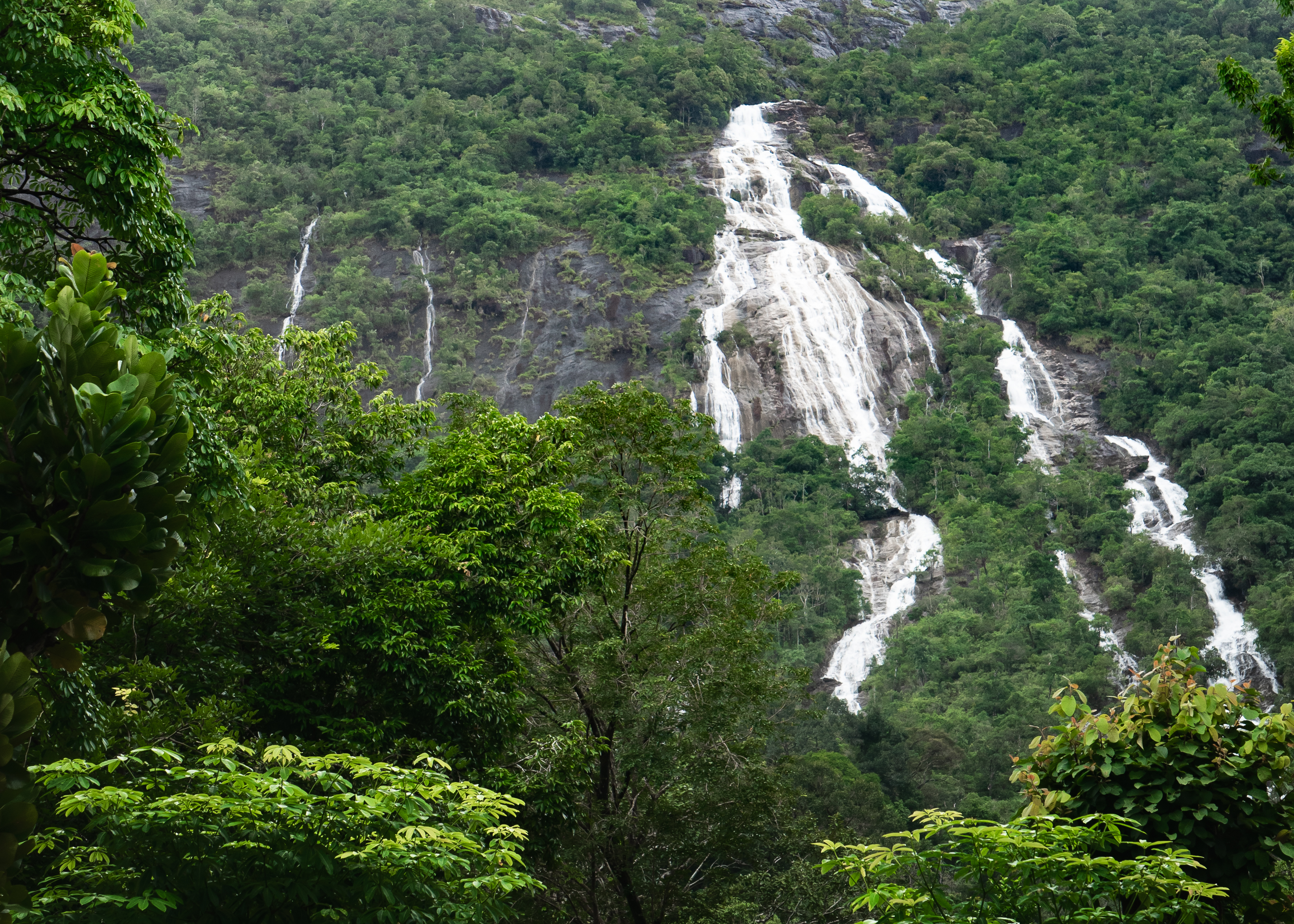
- Ngao waterfall

- Park location in Thailand
- Location: Thailand
- Nearest city: Ranong
- Coordinates: 9.9614°N 98.8°E
- Area: 713 km^{2} (275 sq mi)
- Established: 1999
- Governing body: Department of National Parks, Wildlife and Plant Conservation

Namtok Ngao National Park, formerly Khlong Phrao National Park, is a national park in Ranong and Chumphon provinces in Thailand. The park is home to waterfalls, tropical forests and mountains.

== Geography ==
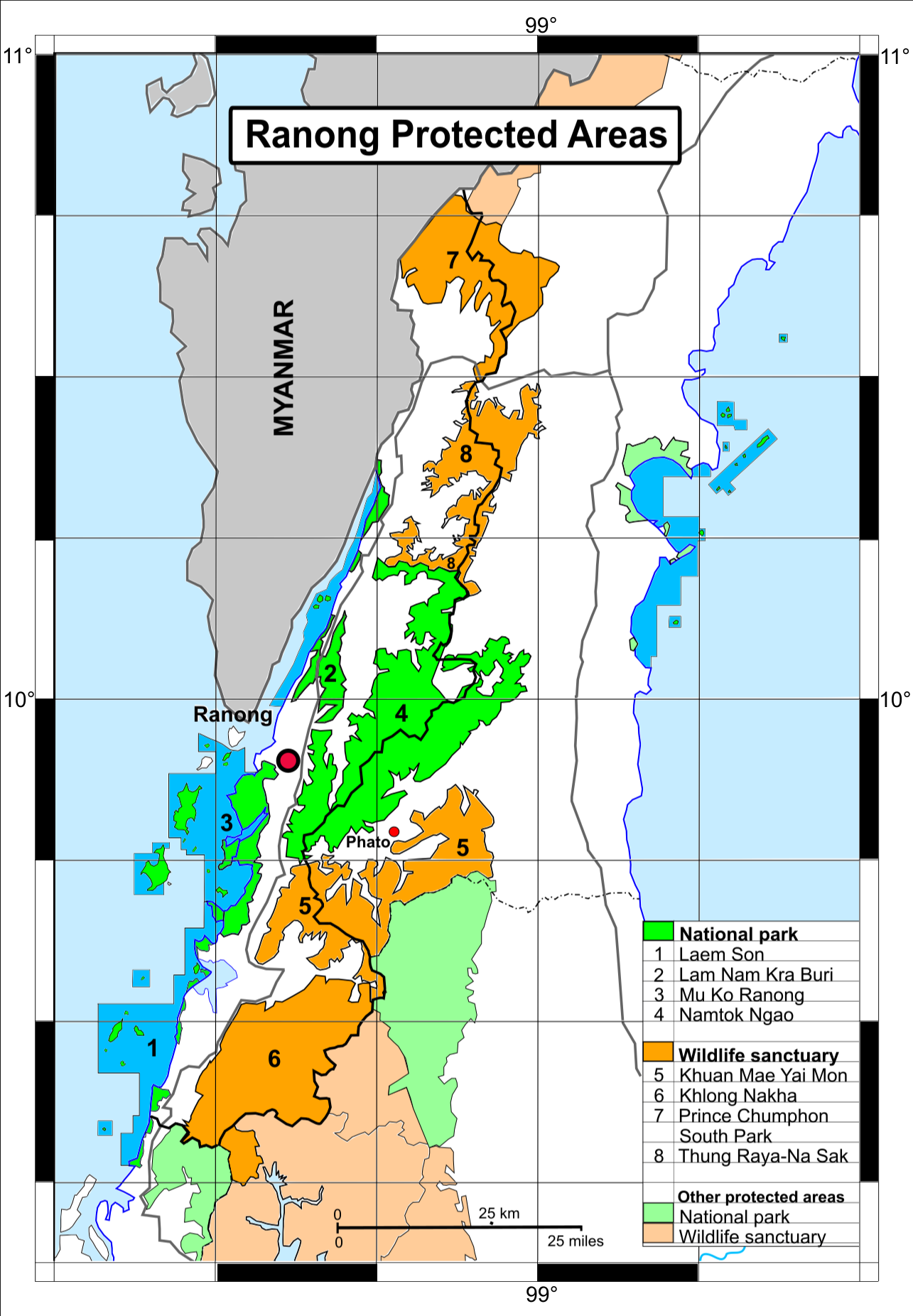
Protected Areas of Ranong province

Namtok Ngao National Park is about 13 km (8 mi) from Ranong. The park's area is 713 km^{2} (275 sq mi). The park's highest point is Khao Nom Sao at 1,089 m (3,573 ft). Other mountains include Khao Daen and Khao Huai Siat.

== Attractions ==
The park's highest waterfall is the namesake Ngao Waterfall. Other park waterfalls include Khlong Phrao, 36 m (120 ft) high, and Bang Rin waterfalls.

== Flora and fauna ==
The park features tropical rainforest, hosting plant species including Rafflesia kerrii, Michelia champaca, Hopea sangal, Intsia palembanica, Mesua ferrea, Lagerstroemia speciosa, Tetrameles nudiflora, Salacca wallichiana, Parashorea stellata and the endangered species Dipterocarpus grandiflorus and Anisoptera costata. Also present is the orchid species Dendrobium formosum, the provincial flower of Ranong province.

The park hosts animals including elephant, tapir, serow, binturong, gaur, common muntjac and endangered primates the pig-tailed macaque and the dusky langur. Birds in the park include great hornbill, bulbul, great argus, red junglefowl.

In 1986, a new species of freshwater crab, Phricotelphusa sirindhorn (panda crab), was identified in the park. Its habitat is in mountain streams at about 100 m (300 ft) elevation.
