= Milk-rejection sign =

- Differential diagnosis: breast cancer (possible)

The milk-rejection sign is a medical sign in which an infant rejects a nursing mother's milk from a particular breast. It is a marker of possible breast cancer.
