= Khao Nom Sao =

Mountain in Thailand

- Location within Thailand

Highest point
- Elevation: 1,089 m (3,573 ft)
- Listing: List of mountains in Thailand; Breast-shaped hills
- Coordinates: 9°48′00″N 98°39′06″E

Geography
- Location: Ranong province, Thailand
- Parent range: Tenasserim Hills

Geology
- Mountain type: limestone/granite

Climbing
- Easiest route: drive

Khao Nom Sao (เขานมสาว), 'female breast mountain', is a mountain in Ranong province, Thailand.

== Description ==
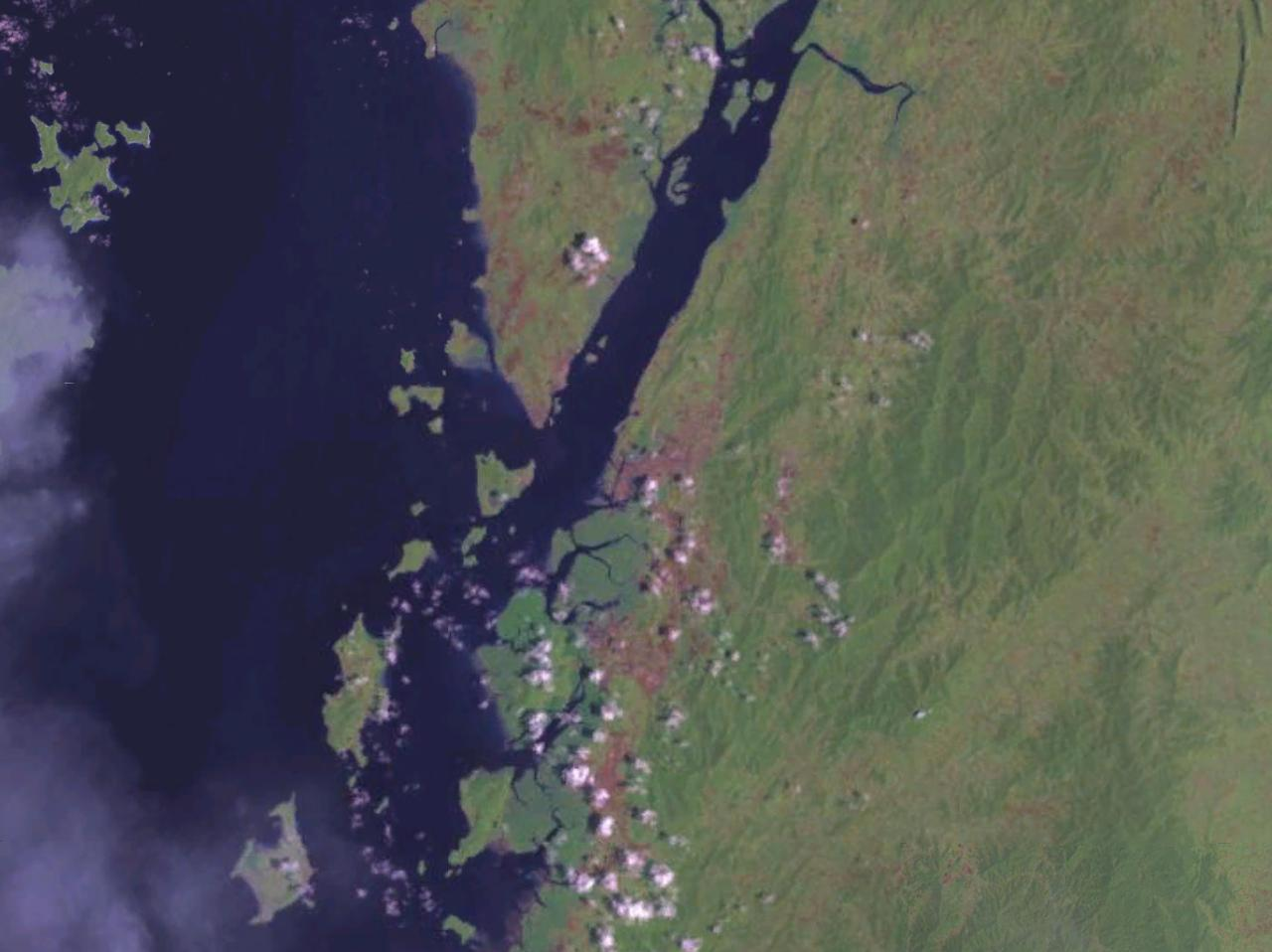
Khao Nom Sao is part of the mountain range on the center-right of the image.

Khao Nom Sao is the highest summit of a rugged mountain massif that stretches roughly from north to south in the Kra Isthmus. This mountain range represents an important catchment area for many rivers of Ranong and Chumphon provinces, forming a natural provincial border. Khao Daen and Khao Huai Siad, are other prominent peaks of the chain, which is part of the wider Tenasserim Hills.

Khao Nom Sao is in Namtok Ngao National Park (อุทยานแห่งชาติน้ำตกหงาว), with hiking trails to the summit.

== See also ==
- Breast-shaped hills
