= Tha Chang railway station (Surat Thani) =

Railway station in Thailand

Coordinates: 9.2754°N 99.1997°E

Tha Chang ท่าฉาง
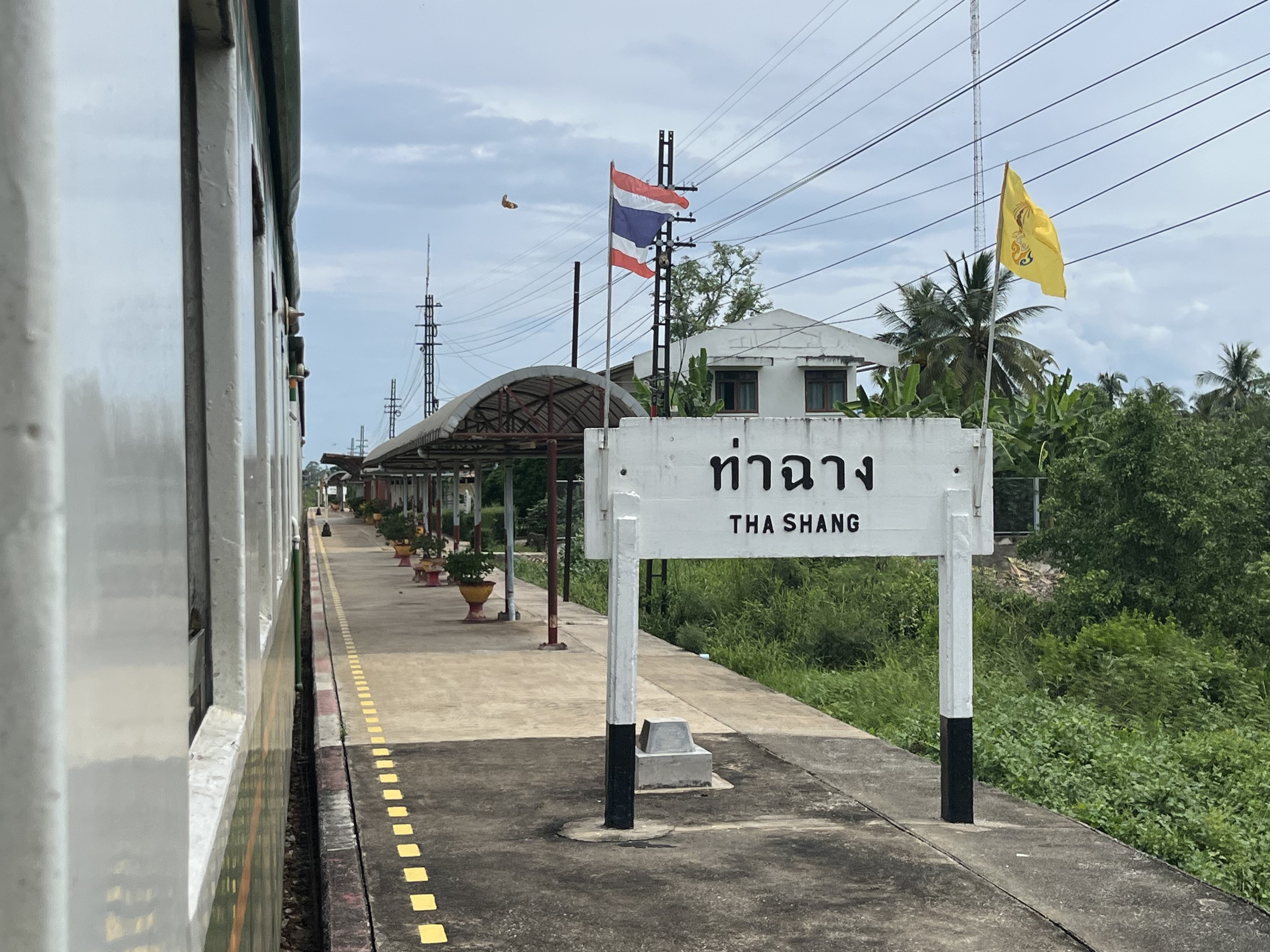

General information
- Location: Khao Than Subdistrict, Tha Chang District, Surat Thani
- Owner: State Railway of Thailand
- Platforms: 1
- Tracks: 2

Other information
- Station code: ทฉ.

History
- Former names: Khao Than

Services
Preceding station	State Railway of Thailand	Following station
Chaiya towards Hua Lamphong or Krung Thep Aphiwat	Southern Line	Khlong Khut Halt towards Su-ngai Kolok
Location

Tha Chang railway station (spelt 'Tha Shang' on signage) is a railway station located in Khao Than Subdistrict, Tha Chang District, Surat Thani. It is a class 2 railway station, located 610.538 km (379.4 mi) from Thon Buri railway station.

== Train services ==
- Rapid No. 167/168 Bangkok-Kantang-Bangkok
- Local No. 445/446 Chumphon-Hat Yai Junction-Chumphon

== Gallery ==
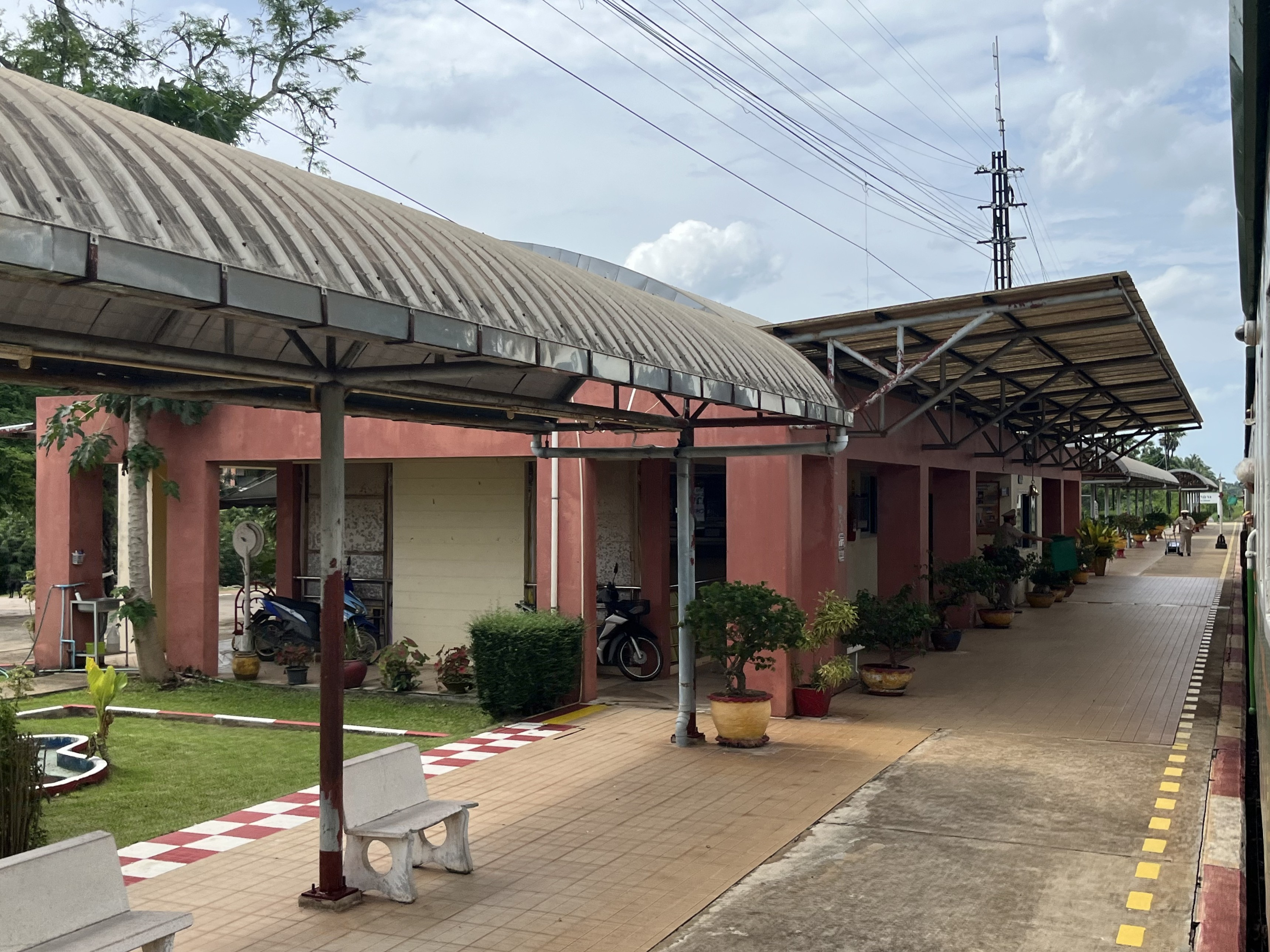
Current station building
