= Maluan railway station =

Railway station in Thailand

Coordinates: 9.1649°N 99.1593°E

Maluan มะลวน
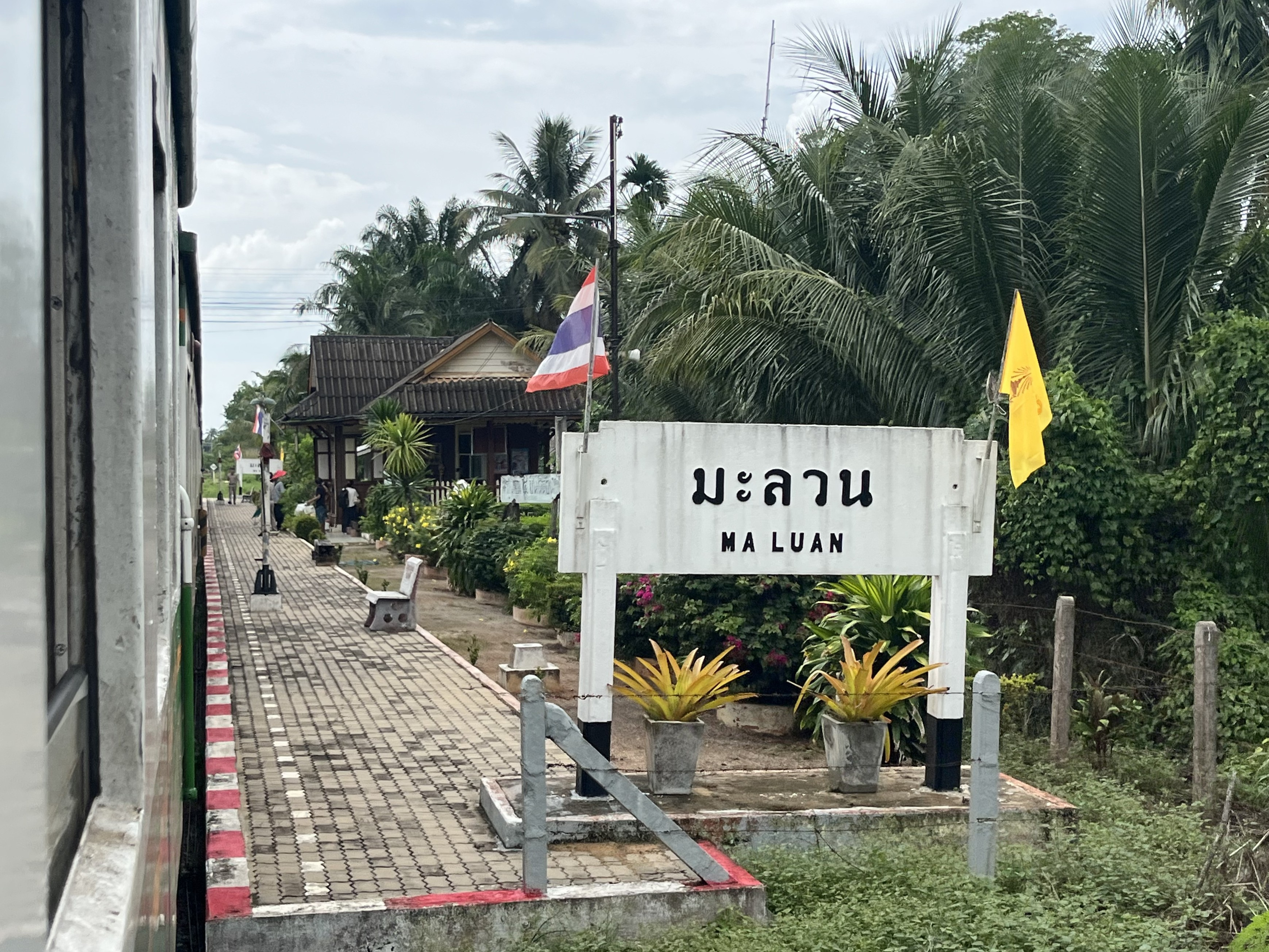

General information
- Location: National Highway No.4112, Maluan Subdistrict, Phunphin District, Surat Thani
- Owner: State Railway of Thailand
- Line: Southern Line
- Platforms: 1
- Tracks: 2

Other information
- Station code: ลว.

Services
Preceding station	State Railway of Thailand	Following station
Khlong Sye towards Hua Lamphong or Krung Thep Aphiwat	Southern Line	Ban Thung Pho Junction towards Su-ngai Kolok
Location

Maluan railway station is a railway station located in Maluan Subdistrict, Phunphin District, Surat Thani, Thailand. It is a class 3 railway station located 623.929 km (387.7 mi) from Thon Buri railway station.

== Train services ==
- Local No. 445/446 Chumphon-Hat Yai Junction-Chumphon
