= Khlong Sai railway station (Surat Thani) =

Railway station in Thailand

Coordinates: 9.2087°N 99.1644°E

Khlong Sai คลองไทร
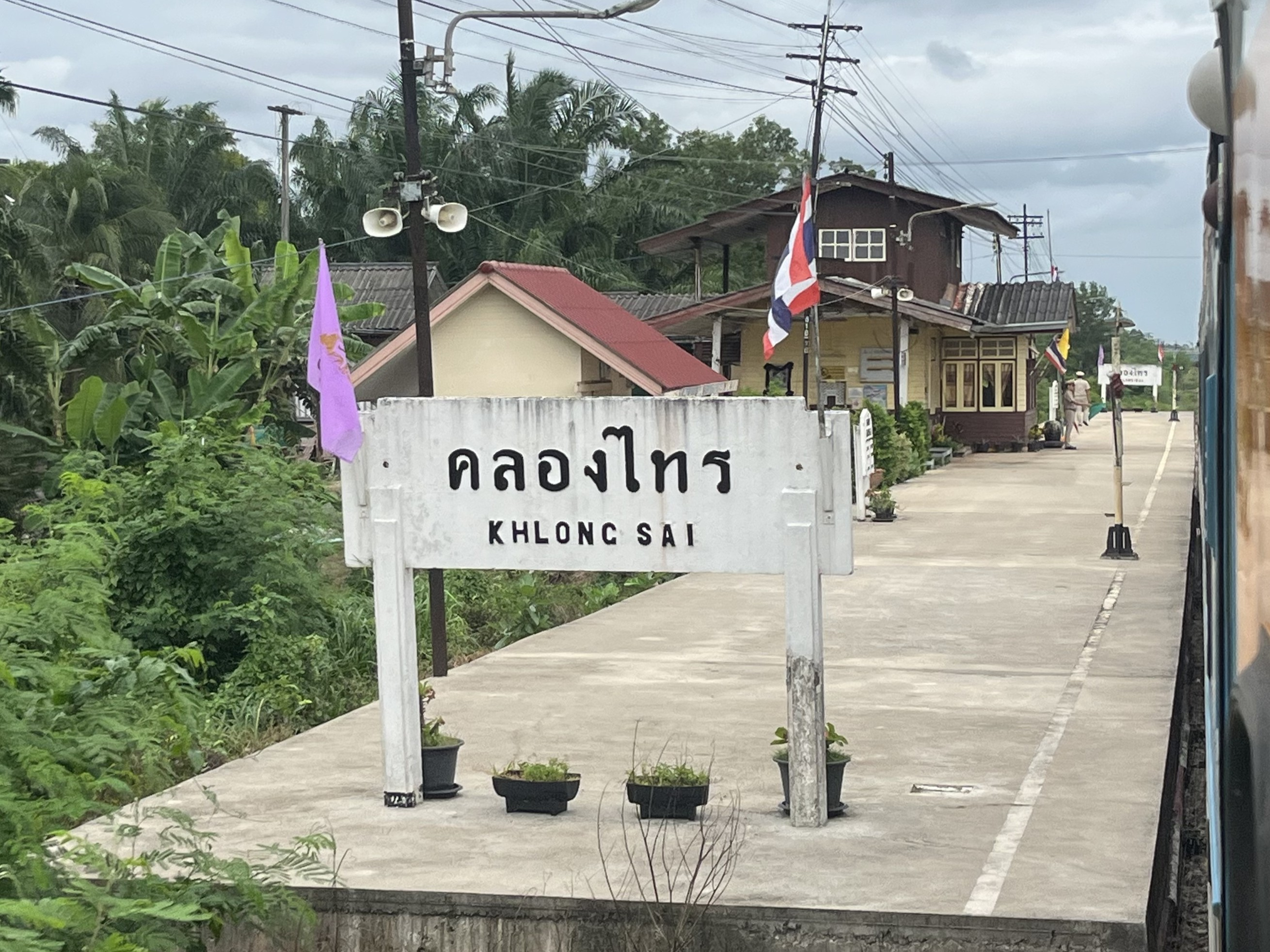
- Station in 2026

General information
- Location: National Highway No. 4112, Khlong Sai Subdistrict, Tha Chang District, Surat Thani
- Owner: State Railway of Thailand
- Line: Southern Line
- Platforms: 1
- Tracks: 2

Other information
- Station code: คไ.

History
- Former names: Tha Khoei

Services
Preceding station	State Railway of Thailand	Following station
Khlong Khut Halt towards Hua Lamphong or Krung Thep Aphiwat	Southern Line	Maluan towards Su-ngai Kolok
Location

Khlong Sai railway station (Note: Adjacent stations (Maluan, Tha Chang) still use the old spelling "Khlong Sye" on their signage.) is a railway station located in Khlong Sai Subdistrict, Tha Chang District, Surat Thani. It is a class 3 railway station located 618.877 km (384.6 mi) from Thon Buri railway station.

== Train services ==
- Local No. 445/446 Chumphon-Hat Yai Junction-Chumphon

== Gallery ==
Station building
