= Khlong Khut railway halt =

Railway station in Thailand

Khlong Khut คลองขุด
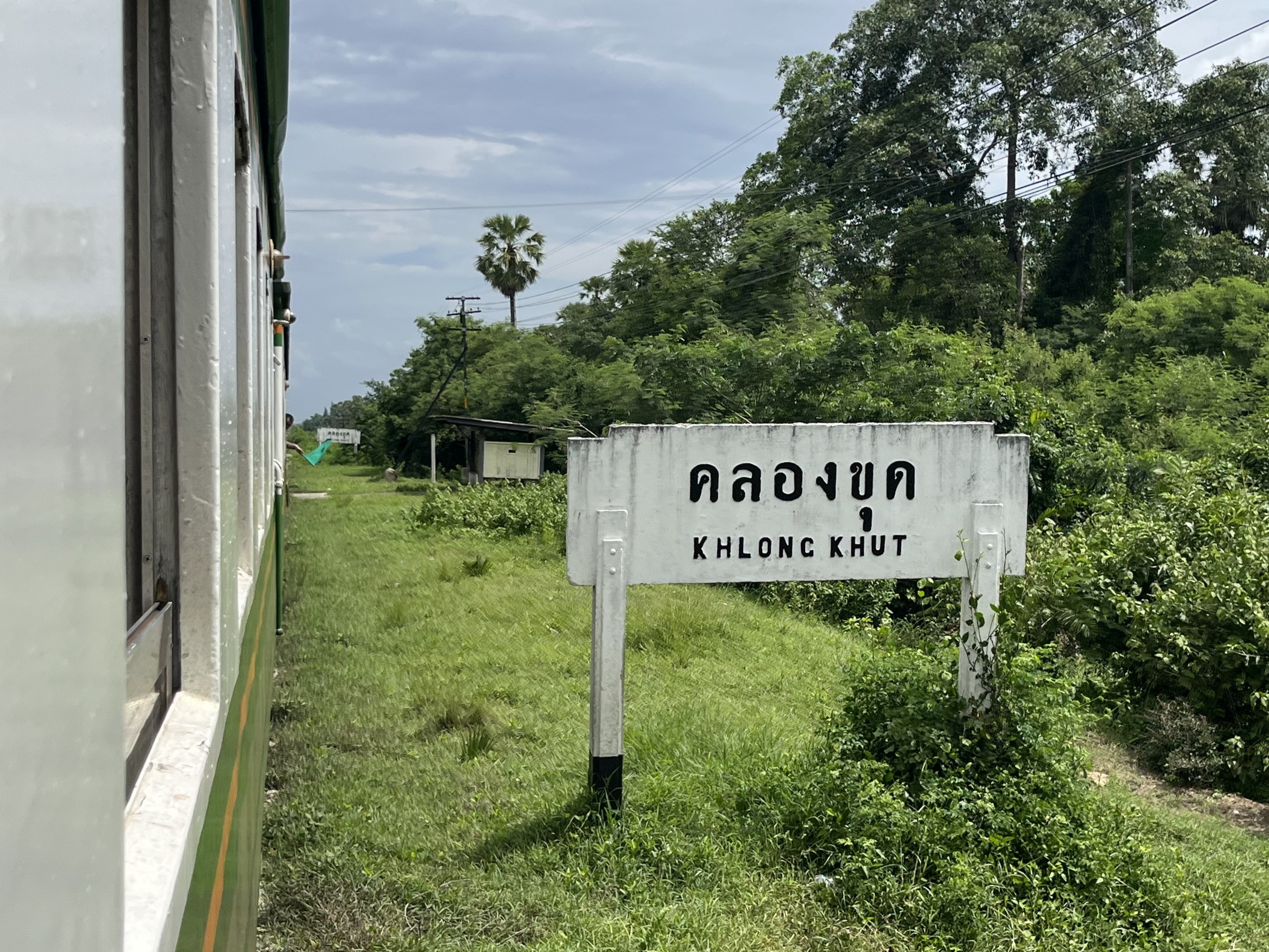

General information
- Location: National Highway No.4112, Mu 5 (Ban Khlong Khut), Tha Chang Subdistrict, Tha Chang District, Surat Thani
- Owner: State Railway of Thailand
- Line: Southern Line
- Platforms: 1
- Tracks: 1

Other information
- Station code: ขด.

Services
Preceding station	State Railway of Thailand	Following station
Tha Chang (Surat Thani) towards Hua Lamphong or Krung Thep Aphiwat	Southern Line	Khlong Sye towards Su-ngai Kolok
Location

Khlong Khut Railway Halt is a railway halt located in Tha Chang Subdistrict, Tha Chang District, Surat Thani. It is located 614 km (381.5 mi) from Thon Buri Railway Station.

== Train services ==
- Local No. 445/446 Chumphon-Hat Yai Junction-Chumphon

== Gallery ==
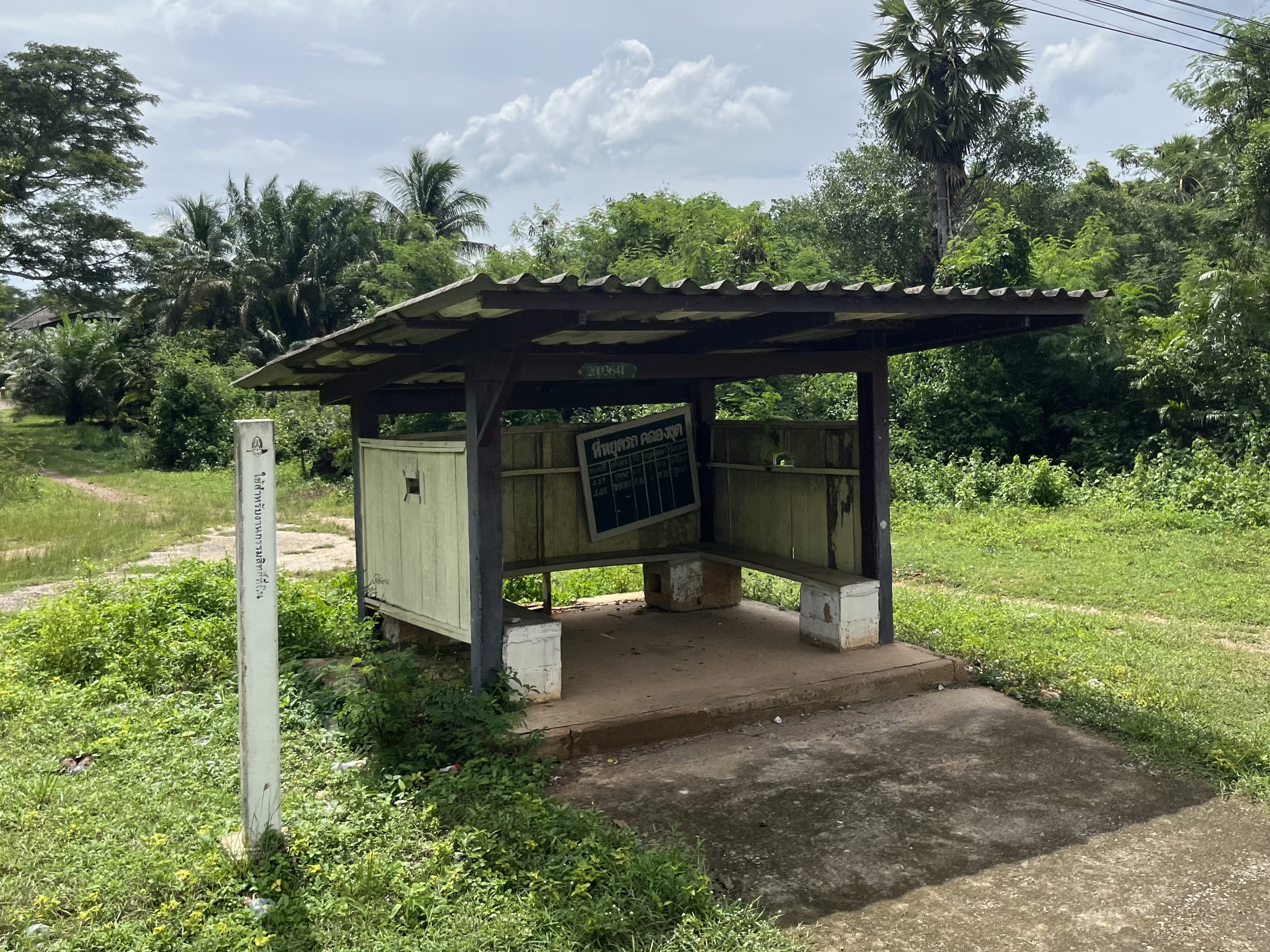
Halt shelter, built on top of former station building.
