= Tha Kham, Surat Thani =

Tha Kham ท่าข้าม
- Town municipality
- Tha Kham Town Municipality เทศบาลเมืองท่าข้าม
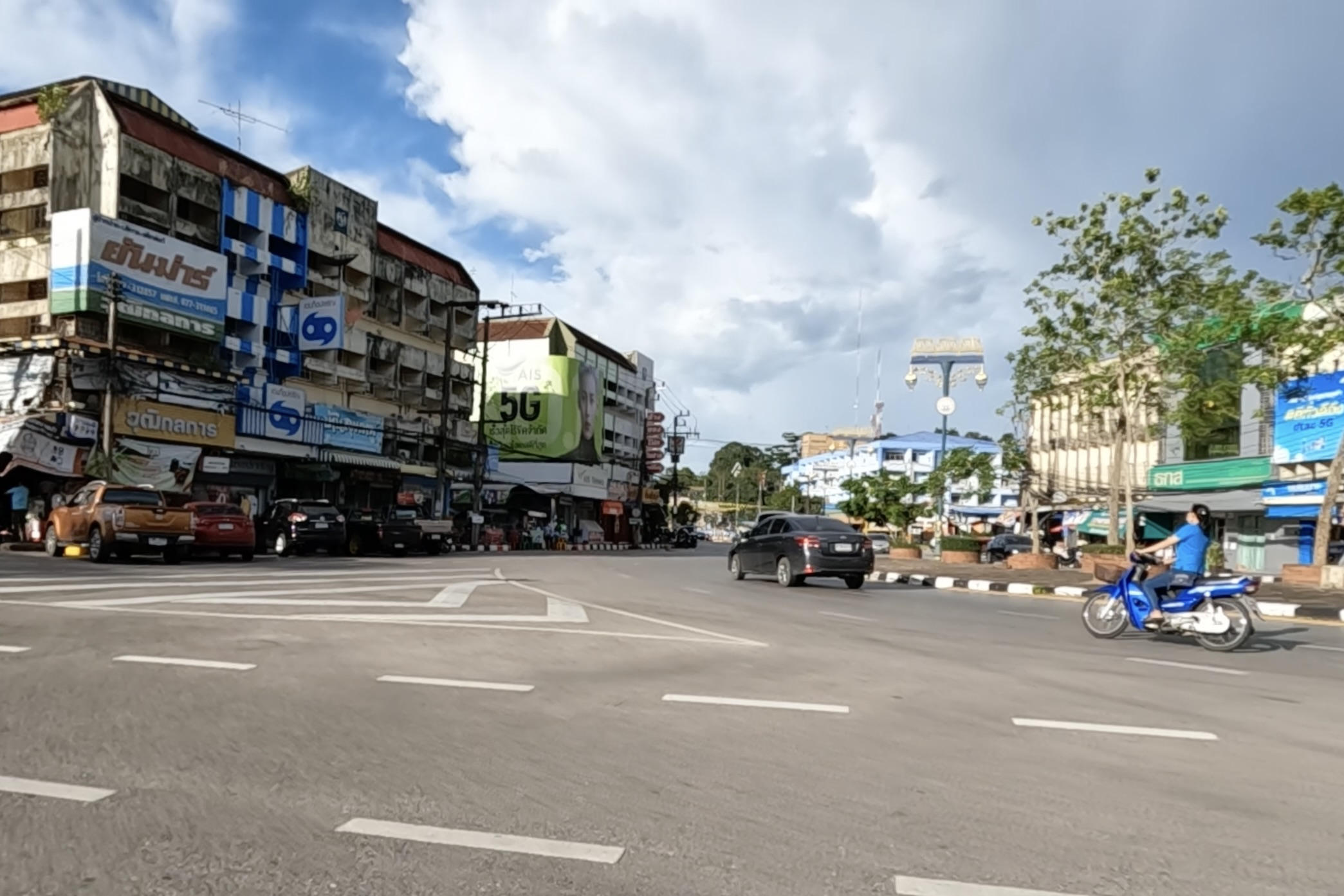
- Tha Kham town center, in front of Surat Thani railway station

- Location of Tha Kham in Thailand
- Coordinates: 9°6′21.2″N 99°13′57.4″E
- Country: Thailand
- Province: Surat Thani
- District: Phunphin

Government
  - Type: Mayor–council government
  - Mayor: Wasu Praditporn

Area
  - Total: 14.10 km^{2} (5.44 sq mi)

Population (May 2024)
  - Total: 17,880
  - Density: 1,268/km^{2} (3,284/sq mi)
- Local government code: 04841701
- Website: www.takhamcity.go.th

Tha Kham (Thai: ท่าข้าม) is a town in southern Thailand. As of May 2024 it covered an area of 14.10 km² and had a population of 17,880. It covers parts of the subdistrict (tambon) Tha Kham of Phunphin District, Surat Thani Province. It is on the shores of the Tapi River. The Surat Thani Railway Station is in town center.

== History ==
The town dates back to the sanitary district (sukhaphiban), Tha Kham, which was created on 17 September 1955. It was upgraded to a township (thesaban tambon) on 14 April 1986, and further upgraded to a town (thesaban mueang) on 20 December 2000.

== Symbols ==
The seal of the town shows the Tapi River railway bridge.
