= Rungius =

Rungius may refer to:

- Carl Rungius (1869–1959), German-American wildlife artist
- Nicolaus Rungius (ca. 1560–1629), vicar of Keminmaa, Finland
