= Capuchin Crypt in Brno =

17th century burial site

- Kapucínská hrobka v Brně
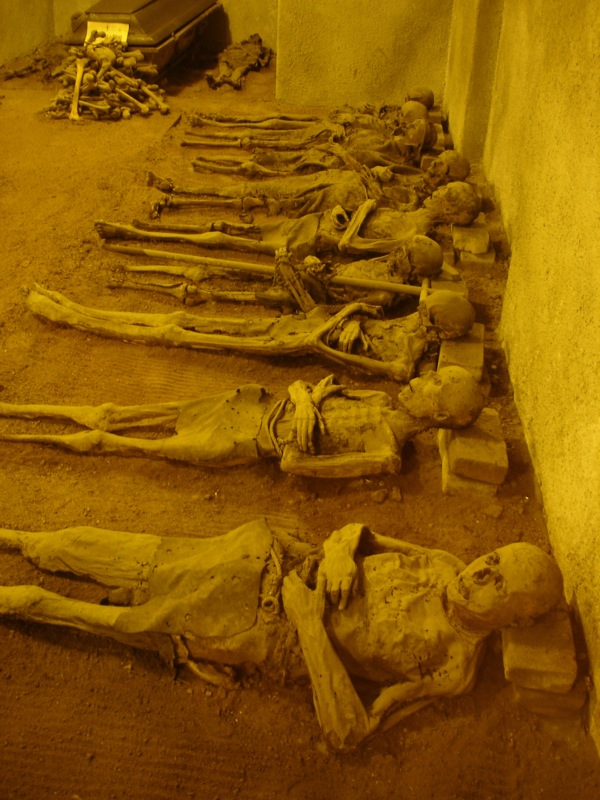

General information
- Location: Brno, Kapucínské náměstí 303, Czech Republic
- Coordinates: 49°11′28.01″N 16°36′33.98″E
- Completed: mid 17th century

Website
- https://hrobka.kapucini.cz/subdom/hrobka/index.php/en/

The Capuchin Crypt in Brno (Czech: Kapucínská hrobka v Brně) is a funeral room mainly for Capuchin friars. The crypt was founded in the mid 17th century in the basement of the Capuchin Monastery in the historical centre of Brno. The bodies of people buried there turned into mummies because of the geological composition of the ground and the system of airing. Near the entrance of the crypt rests the body and relics of St Clementaine, an ancient Roman noblewoman.

Under a poverty vow, Capuchin friars believed coffins to be a luxury. The mummies are today considered a tourist attraction but are also useful for scientific research.
