= Nicolaus Rungius =

Natural mummy of a Finnish Lutheran vicar (c. 1560–1629)

Nicolaus Matthiae Rungius
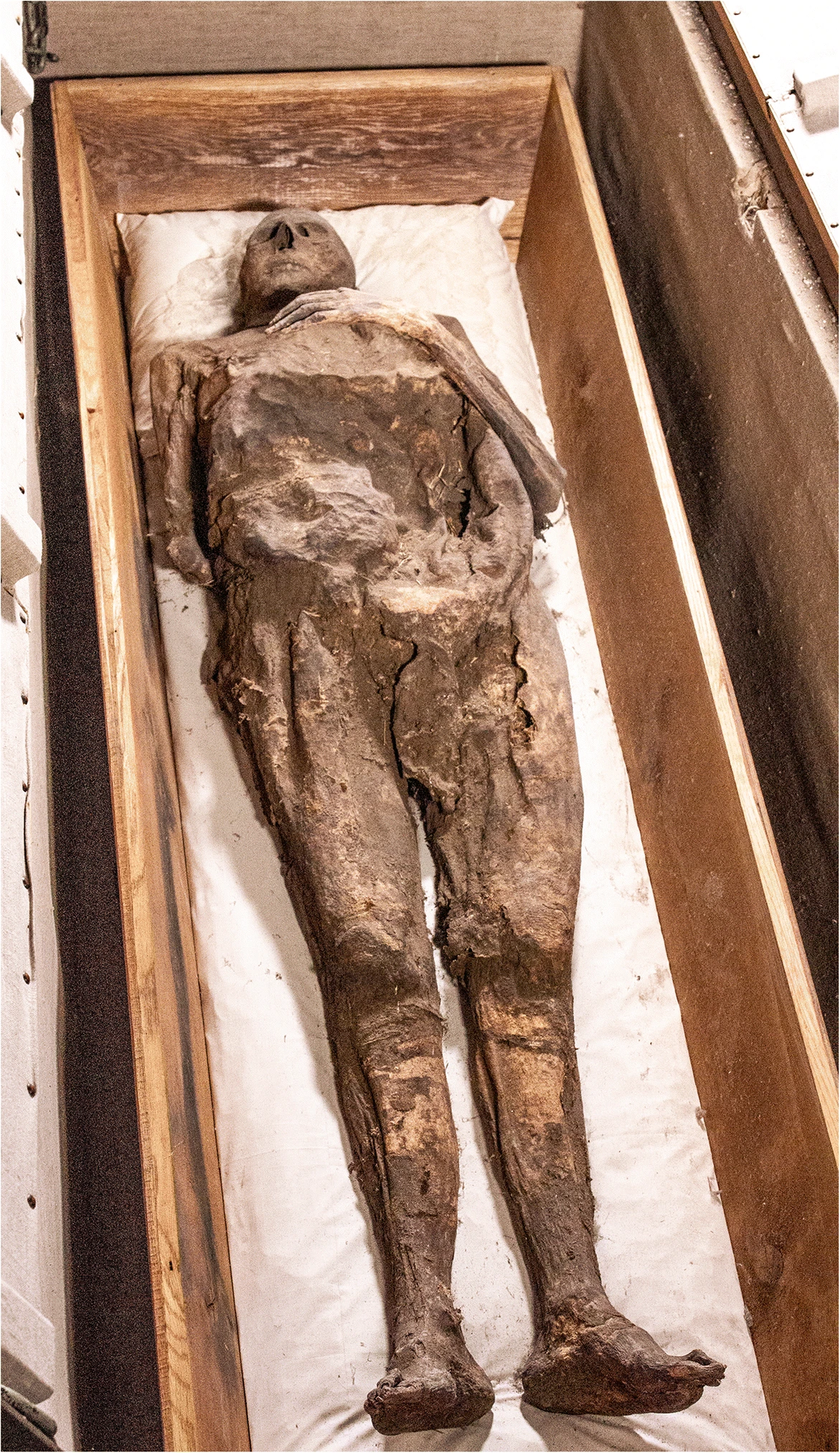
- Rungius's naturally mummified remains in St. Michael's Church, Keminmaa, 2018
- Born: Nicolaus Ryngius c. 1560; Loimaa, Finland
- Died: 1629 (aged 68–69); Keminmaa, Finland
- Resting place: St. Michael's Church, Keminmaa
- Other name: Nicolaus Ryngen
- Occupation: Lutheran clergyman
- Years active: c.1590s–1629
- Known for: Natural mummification of his body beneath St. Michael's Church, Keminmaa

Nicolaus Matthiae Rungius (also spelled Ryngius or Ryngen in contemporary sources; born c. 1560 in Loimaa – died 1629 in Keminmaa) was a Finnish Lutheran vicar who served Kemi Parish in northern Finland during the early seventeenth century.

Following his death, Rungius was buried beneath the floor of St. Michael's Church, Keminmaa, where his body became naturally mummified in the cold, dry conditions beneath the church. Rediscovered during the early eighteenth century, the remarkably well-preserved remains became the focus of local legends, pilgrimage and popular veneration. Modern examinations using computed tomography, radiography, osteology, stable isotope analysis and histology have made Rungius one of Finland's best-studied naturally mummified individuals.

== Biography ==
Rungius was born at the Rynkö homestead in Loimaa, and so he was named Ryngius (later changed to Rungius). He worked as a chaplain in the Nykarleby and Keminmaa churches. He married Helena, the daughter of the Kemi vicar Simon Ruuth, and followed his father-in-law as vicar. As vicar, he managed matters all over the Kemi Lapland area, but was not an unusual preacher during his lifetime.

== Death and burial ==
Rungius died in 1629 after serving as vicar of Kemi Parish for about 15 years, during the Thirty Years' War. Following the custom for prominent Lutheran clergy of the period, he was buried beneath the floor of St. Michael's Church in Keminmaa, near the chancel.

== Condition and preservation ==
Nearly 400 years after his death, Rungius's body remains naturally mummified beneath St. Michael's Church in Keminmaa. Much of his skin, hair, muscles, tendons and ligaments have survived, together with some internal soft tissues, although the body has shrunk and darkened as it dried over the centuries. His head is detached from the torso, and one forearm disappeared after 1875, probably after being removed as a relic.

When Rungius was buried beneath the church floor in 1629, his body was not embalmed or deliberately preserved. Instead, the cold, dry and well-ventilated conditions beneath the church gradually dehydrated the body rather than allowing it to decompose completely. Researchers have suggested that an interval between his death and burial allowed some of the internal organs to begin decomposing before the remaining tissues dried naturally.

After the body was rediscovered in the early eighteenth century, it was moved several times, examined by researchers and repeatedly displayed to visitors. Today, the remains are displayed in a protective glass case that allows visitors to view the mummy.

== Rediscovery ==
Rungius's reputation grew when his body, which had been mummified instead of decomposing, was found underneath the church floor during the Greater Wrath in the early 18th century. Thus started stories about his powerful words and miracles. A legend of sainthood proportions surrounded him and people went as far as to go on pilgrimages to see his body. Rungius has been claimed to have said during his life: "If my words are not true, my body will decompose, but if they are true, it will never decompose."

Unusually, Rungius's body was not intentionally protected from decomposition, but rather naturally mummified beneath the church floor. The body still retained two arms by 1875, but one of them has since disappeared, apparently taken as a relic.

== Clothing and associated items ==
Although nearly 400 years had passed since Rungius's burial, enough of his clothing remained for researchers to reconstruct aspects of his burial attire and social status. While repeated transfers between coffins over the following three centuries damaged many of the textiles, the surviving fragments show that he was buried in garments made from fine flax, nettle and cotton fabrics. Analysis of the textiles indicates that Rungius was buried in high-quality clothing consistent with his relatively high social status.

Rungius was buried wearing finely knitted, knee-length flax stockings that still cover much of his lower legs. Although much of the fabric has decayed, the knit pattern remains impressed into the skin beneath it. Made from exceptionally fine thread, the stockings would have been more expensive than the wool stockings worn by most seventeenth-century Finns. Marks below both knees also suggest they were originally secured with garters, which have since disappeared.

Fragments of finely woven nettle cloth found on his chest probably came from the shirt in which he was buried, while additional pieces of nettle and cotton fabric remained on his right thigh. Cotton was a rare imported material in early seventeenth-century northern Finland, probably arriving through long-distance trade from India. Researchers suggest the textiles represent either high-quality garments from his lifetime or clothing prepared specifically for his burial.

Among the textile remains, researchers also recovered part of a bird feather. It may indicate that Rungius rested on a feather-filled mattress or pillow, although the feather could also have been carried into the coffin later by rodents. Together, the clothing and associated finds provide further evidence of Rungius's relatively high social status.

== Scientific study ==
Nearly 400 years after his death, Rungius has been examined using computed tomography (CT), radiography, osteology, stable isotope analysis and histology, making him one of the best-studied naturally mummified individuals in Finland.

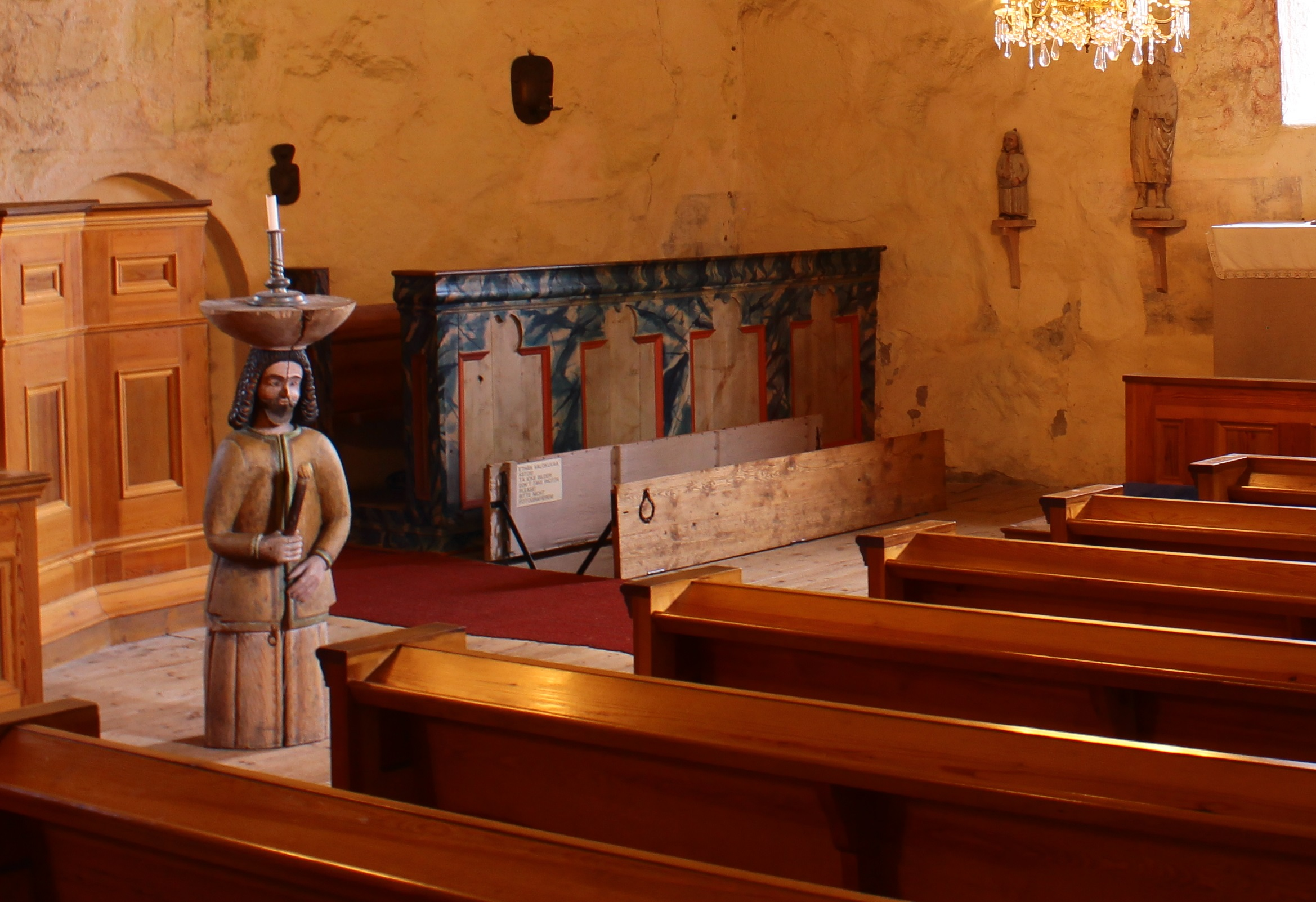
The location of Rungius's burial beneath the floor of St. Michael's Church, Keminmaa. His remains are displayed beneath the open floor hatches between the altar and the sacristy.

In 2011, a full-body CT scan allowed researchers to examine Rungius without disturbing his remains. The scans showed that much of his skin, muscles, tendons and ligaments had survived despite centuries beneath the floor of St. Michael's Church, Keminmaa. They also documented the condition of the preserved remains and identified diffuse idiopathic skeletal hyperostosis (DISH), together with possible evidence of spinal tuberculosis and other age-related skeletal changes. The imaging further indicated that Rungius was a relatively large man for an early seventeenth-century Finn.

The studies also provided new insights into Rungius's health and lifestyle. Osteological examination found no evidence of heavy physical labour, while his teeth were generally well preserved. Stable isotope analysis of his bones indicated that he regularly consumed a protein-rich diet, probably including salmon, seal, game and domestic livestock available in northern Finland. His nitrogen isotope values were higher than those reported for other early modern individuals buried beneath northern Finnish churches.

The research also helped explain why Rungius's body survived. Microscopic examination of preserved tissues found no evidence of embalming, indicating that his body was naturally mummified as the cold, dry and well-ventilated conditions beneath St. Michael's Church gradually dehydrated the remains and limited microbial decay.

== Exhibition ==
The vicar's body is still in the Keminmaa old St. Michael Church underneath the floor between the altar and the sacristry, protected by glass. Visitors may see the mummy during summertime, when the church is open for tourists, but the corpse may not be photographed.
