= List of mummies =

This is a list of mummies – corpses whose skin and organs have been preserved intentionally, or incidentally.

This list does not include the following:

- Bog bodies for which there is a separate list
- List of Egyptian mummies (royalty)
- List of Egyptian mummies (officials, nobles, and commoners)

Name	Location	Approximate lifetime	Picture	Refs.
Baishinni (梅唇尼)	Japan			
Jeremy Bentham	England	15 February 1748 – 6 June 1832		
Taoists Bi Yuexia (碧月俠), Bi Dengxia (碧燈俠), Bi Chenxia (碧塵俠)	China			
Bùi Thị Khang	Vietnam			
Amy Carlson	United States	November 30, 1975 – April 2021		
Chen Jinggu (陳靖姑) (Taoist woman)	Taiwan	766 CE - 790 CE		
Chiang Kai-shek	Taiwan	1887–1975		
Chiang Ching-kuo	Taiwan	1910–1988		
Children of Llullaillaco	Argentine	2 girls and 1 boy mummies		
Chinchorro mummies	Chile / Peru	5000–3000 BCE		
Charles Eugène de Croÿ	Estonia	died 1702		
Cladh Hallan mummies	South Uist, Scotland	c. 1600–1100 BCE (individuals represented in two composite mummies)		
Claudia Zobel	Philippines	1964–1984		
Egtved Girl	Denmark	1370 BC		
Empress Xiaoyichun (Weigiya)	China			
Franklin's lost expedition mummies	Canada	1845		
Fujiwara no Kiyohira	Japan	1056–1128		
Fujiwara no Motohira (藤原基衡)	Japan			
Fujiwara no Hidehira	Japan	1122?–1187		
Fujiwara no Yasuhira	Japan	1155–1189		
Georgi Dimitrov (buried)	Bulgaria	1882–1949		
Gu Congli (顧從禮) and wife Qiao (喬氏)	China	1510–1583		
Guanche mummies	Canary Islands	some have been radiocarbon dated as early as the 12th century		
Han Sicong (韓思聰)	China	1412–1476		
Hazel Farris	USA	ca 1880–20 December 1906		
James Hepburn, 4th Earl of Bothwell	England	c. 1534–14 April 1578		
Ho Chi Minh	Vietnam	19 May 1890 – 2 September 1969		
Huang Zhuowu (黃拙吾)	China	died c. Kangxi era		
Mummy Juanita	Peru	died c. 1450–1480		
The Ice Maiden	Siberia	5th century BCE		
Dashi-Dorzho Itigilov	Siberia	1852–1927		
Christian Friedrich von Kahlbutz	Prussia	1651–1702		
Sogen Kato	Japan	22 July 1899–c. November 1978		
Mustafa Kemal Atatürk, buried	Turkey	1881–1938		
Kherima Mumie	Brazil	1804–1824		
Klement Gottwald, buried	Czechoslovakia	1896–1953		
Kim Il-Sung	North Korea	15 April 1912 – 8 July 1994		
Kim Jong-il	North Korea	16 February 1941 – 17 December 2011		
Vissarion Korkoliacos	Greece	1908–1991		
Kwäday Dän Ts’ìnchi	Canada	born c. 1450–1700		
Le Du Tong (黎裕宗)	Vietnam	1680–1731		
Lee Myung Jeong (李明正)	South Korea	died c. 1550		
Vladimir Lenin	Russia	22 April 1870 – 21 January 1924		
Li (李公)	China	died c. 1550		
Ling Huiping (凌惠平)	China	c. 1		
Rosalia Lombardo	Sicily	1918–6 December 1920		
Ma Jinying (馬金瑛) (Taoist woman)	China			
Manchester Mummy	England	1688–February 1758		
Maunula mummy	Finland	1938–1994		
Maronite mummies	Lebanon	1283 AD		
Mao Zedong	China	1893–1976		
Elmer McCurdy	USA	January, 1880–7 October 1911		
Moimango	New Guinea			
José dos Santos Ferreira Moura	Portugal	1839–1887		
Mummies of Guanajuato	Mexico	died in Cholera outbreak in 1833		
Mun (一善文氏) and a grandson Yi Eung-tae (李應台)	South Korea	Yi 1556–1586		
Nicolaus Rungius	Finland	c. 1560–1629		
Ötzi the Iceman	Italy / Austria	c. 3300 BCE		
San Pedro Mountains mummy	USA			
Eva Perón	Argentina	7 May 1919 – 26 July 1952		
Persian Princess	Pakistan	died 1996		
Phạm Thị Nguyên Chân	Vietnam			
Pham Thi Dang	Vietnam			
Polleke	Netherlands	mummified cat (died ca. 1440-1460)		
Pregnant Mummy	Egypt			
Luang Pho Daeng	Thailand	1894-1973		
Qilakitsoq mummies	Greenland	c. 1460		
Qiao Jian'an (喬健庵) and wife	China	died c. Jiajing		
Joseph Stalin (buried)	Russia	18 December 1878 – 5 March 1953		
Taoists Xuanxu (玄虛道人), his student Xuanzhi (玄智道人), Songfeng (松風道人), Songzhu (松竹道人)	China			
Spirit Cave mummy	USA	died about 9400 ago		
St. Michan's Church mummies	Ireland	diverse lifetimes; e.g. a 400-year-old mummy of a nun		
Sui Shaoyan (遂少言)	China	died 67 BCE		
Tarim mummies (including Cherchen Man, Yingpan man, Princess of Xiaohe, and Beauty of Loulan)	China	2000–300 BCE		
Tetsumonkai	Japan	1768–1829		
Uan Muhuggiag	Africa / Central Sahara	c. 3500 BCE		
Venzone mummies	Italy			
Wang Bi'an (王弼庵)	China	died 1882		
Windeby I	Germany	41 AD–118 AD		
Wu Yunqing (吴云青) (Taoist)	China			
Xin Zhui	China	c. 217 BCE-168 BCE		
Xu Fan (徐藩) and wife Zhang Panlong (張盤龍)	China	1532		
Yang Fuxun (楊福信)	China	died c.1500		
Yoon clan woman with fetus	South Korea	16th century, Joseon Dynasty		
Yvette Vickers	US			cremated
Zagreb mummy	Croatia	the bindings of the mummy were created 250–100 BCE as a book, around 100 CE there was a shortage of bindings and other materials like the book were used		
Zhang Xiong (張雄)	China	584–633		
Zhou Yu (周瑀)	China	1222–1262		
Amélie of Leuchtenberg	Brazil	31 July 1812 – 26 January 1873		

== See also ==
- List of DNA tested mummies
- Buddhist mummies
- Incorruptibility
