= Huiji Temple =

Huiji Temple (simplified Chinese: 惠济寺; traditional Chinese: 惠濟寺; pinyin: Huìjì Sì or simplified Chinese: 慧济寺; traditional Chinese: 慧濟寺; pinyin: Huìjì Sì), may refer to:

- Huiji Temple (Mount Putuo) (慧济寺; 慧濟寺), on Mount Putuo, in Zhoushan, Zhejiang, China
- Huiji Temple (Nanjing) (惠济寺; 惠濟寺), in Pukou District of Nanjing, Jiangsu, China
- Huiji Temple (Yuanping) (惠济寺; 惠濟寺), in Yuanping, Shanxi, China
