= Wat Lamai =

Coordinates: 9.4740°N 100.0426°E

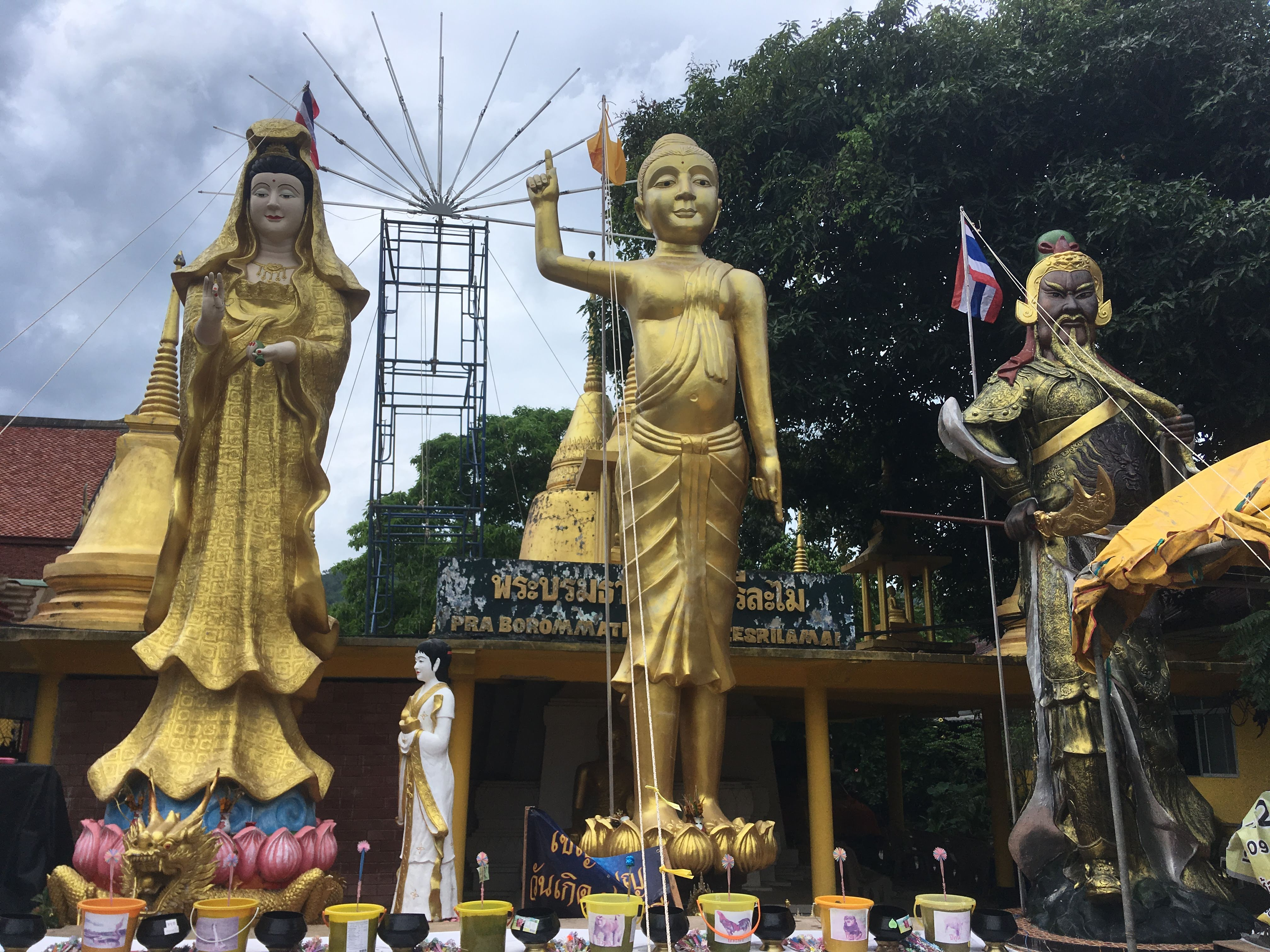
Wat Lamai in Lamai, Ko Samui.

Wat Lamai is a Buddhist temple in the old part of Ban Lamai (usually known as Lamai Beach) on the resort island of Ko Samui, Thailand. Located adjacent to a main bend in Thai Route 4161, the island's ring road, it has a museum of Buddhist artifacts and the history of Ko Samui and also has a cultural hall for public cultural events and other gatherings such as weddings and funerals.

The site covers 8 acres (3.2 ha) (1 ngan, 50 square wah).

== See also ==
- List of Buddhist temples in Thailand
- Wat Phra Yai
- Wat Khunaram
- Wat Plai Laem
