= Tibetan mythology =

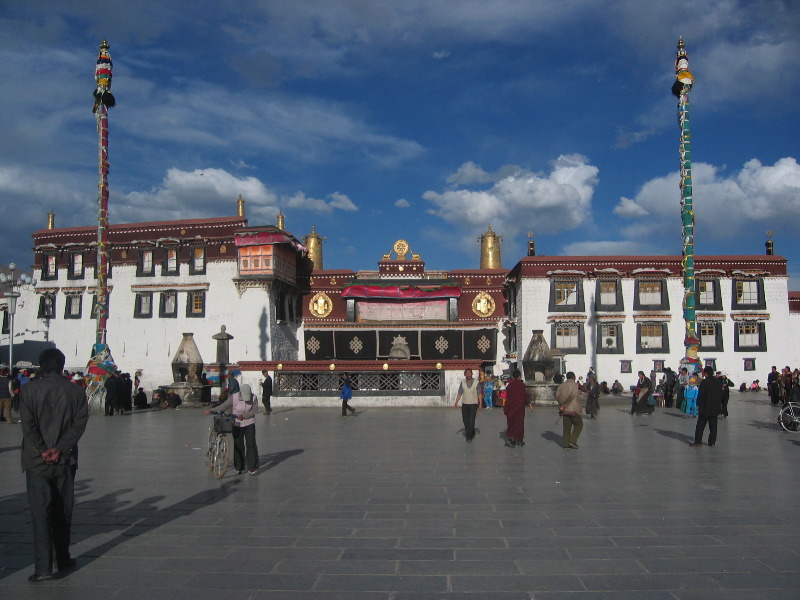
The Jokhang Temple in Tibet.

Tibetan mythology refers to the traditional as well as the religious stories that have been passed down by the Tibetan people. Tibetan mythology consists mainly of national mythology stemming from the Tibetan culture as well as religious mythology from both Tibetan Buddhism and Bön religion. These myths are often passed down orally, through rituals or through traditional art like sculptures or cave paintings. They also feature a variety of different creatures ranging from gods to spirits to monsters which play a significant role in Tibetan mythology. These deities and monsters/evil entities deal with our mental emotions and how to control them. Some of these myths have broken into mainstream Western media, with the most notable one being the Abominable Snowman – the Yeti.

== National mythology ==
National Tibetan mythology stems from the history of the country, and was passed down by word of mouth or works of art such as cave paintings. The latter include gods and sacred mythological creatures like the Five Clawed Great Eagle of the Sky, and also record information about how the Tibetan people lived.

=== Creation myth ===
In the Tibetan creation myth, Pha Trelgen Changchup Sempa is believed to be the monkey ancestor of the Tibetan people. Many versions of this myth have been presented. In the most widely accepted version, the monkey ancestor arrived in Tibet when the world was covered in water and had children that were baby monkeys. These children eventually learned how to use tools, harvest crops, and became self-sufficient. The Tibetan people are said to be descendants of this civilisation.

=== Myths from the Tibetan landscape ===
Many traditional Tibetan myths are based on its unique landscape being located atop a plateau and amongst many mountains. Some of these notable myths include ‘Wild Men of the Tibetan Steppes’, which tells the tale of groups of hairy wild men that were said to be living on the peaks of Tibet amongst the snow and mythical white lions. They were said to be hairy naked savages by some, and the Mongolians referred to them as wild men or Almas a Mongolian term for Bigfoot or other similar hairy big mythical creatures. Others have said that the footprints of these supposed wild men were actually from bears. The immured anchorite is another myth which concerns monks that are confined within a dark, stony walled space only enough fit for one person and would meditate in that small space for the whole of their lives, with a single hole present as to be able to pass food and drink through. These monks take a vow to live their lives in the darkness and these stone walls are not only the place they spend their entire life in but also their tomb. Despite having many national Tibetan myths that are based on the culture and environment in Tibet, there are many myths that share similarities to the mythology from other cultures as Tibet shares borders spanning across different countries. This includes the Epic of King Gesar a ballad follows the story of a brave and fearless lord, Gesar from the mythical kingdom of GLing, and the various heroic deeds he accomplished. Although this is a myth which is a well-known Tibetan myth in the form of an epic poem that is still being sung in the form of a ballad by many throughout Tibet, Mongolia, and much of Central Asia.

== Buddhism ==
The religious mythology present in Tibetan mythology is mostly from Vajrayana Buddhism and Bön Religion. Although the two are separate religions, they are often blended together within Tibetan mythology. Buddhism originally spread from India to Tibet and many myths have been passed down through the form of artworks involving the Samsara, which is the Buddhist cycle of life and death that is at the bane of Buddhism. Bön religion, on the other hand, is a Tibetan religion that has many shared beliefs with Buddhism and has many myths that originate before Buddhism was introduced into the country. Bön religion primarily involves making peace between the human and celestial realms and is closely linked to Tibetan folklore. Religious concepts such as the Rainbow body level of realization are also present in this category.

=== Reincarnation ===
Ideas of reincarnation as well as ghosts and spirits also appear often in these myths as the cycle of rebirth is a concept that entails souls as a temporary form, where some souls become ghosts and roam the world if this cycle is disrupted or unable to be completed. For example in Tibet there are a series of popular narratives regarding death and the afterlife in Buddhism, a story known as ‘A ghost in Monk's Clothes’ is one of these narratives which depicts ghosts as the lingering souls of humans who are unable to move on and that in order to move on, understanding the samsara as well as reflecting on one's life is required. These two qualities are rooted in Buddhism. Buddhist art is often used to record and display myths and is often art that requires active participation from the viewer in order to create meaning for the piece, this also means that it is not just trying to tell a story but also portray a mentality and way of thinking. This idea in Buddhism has been present in Tibetan mythology for a long time and is often seen in Buddhist sculptures throughout history. Although Bön religion and Buddhism are the main religions where most of the myths stem from, Tibet is located in South-West China and borders Burma, India, Nepal, and Bhutan there are also many myths shared within these cultures religions. For example, the Hindu demon Jvarasura the fever deity is also present within Tibetan mythology.

== Deities within Tibetan Mythology ==
A variety of different deities are present within Tibetan mythology and some of the more well-known deities in Tibetan mythology are either from the national mythology of Tibet or from Buddhism, and so are present and shared amongst many cultures.

=== Mountain gods ===
Mountain gods are one of the more notable creatures, as Tibet is covered in mountains, many of which are among the tallest in the world. This led to many myths about mountain gods and how they came to be. It was believed that every mountain had a god guarding it and these gods differ from those who were benevolent and gods who were malevolent. There are four great Sacred Mountains and each one had a god, alongside another five famous Mountain Gods; together, they were named the Nine Creator-Gods. Different areas of Tibet worship different mountain gods. These Mountain Gods were divided into good and bad; gods that rose out of the rubble of old mountains were good and beneficial as they had to face challenges and hardships to emerge, whilst those who rose out of lush green forests were viewed as evil since they were believed to have everything to begin with.

=== Chenrezig ===
Often known as the Avalokiteśvara or Guanyin, this Bodhisattva is portrayed as male in Tibetan culture, but is also portrayed as female in other cultures. Chenrezig is said to personify the compassion of all Buddhas, this Bodhisattva in Tibetan mythology is said to have created Tara, the female Bodhisattva of success with a single tear. This tear had fallen and when it landed it created a lake where Tara emerged from a lotus.

=== Vajrapani ===
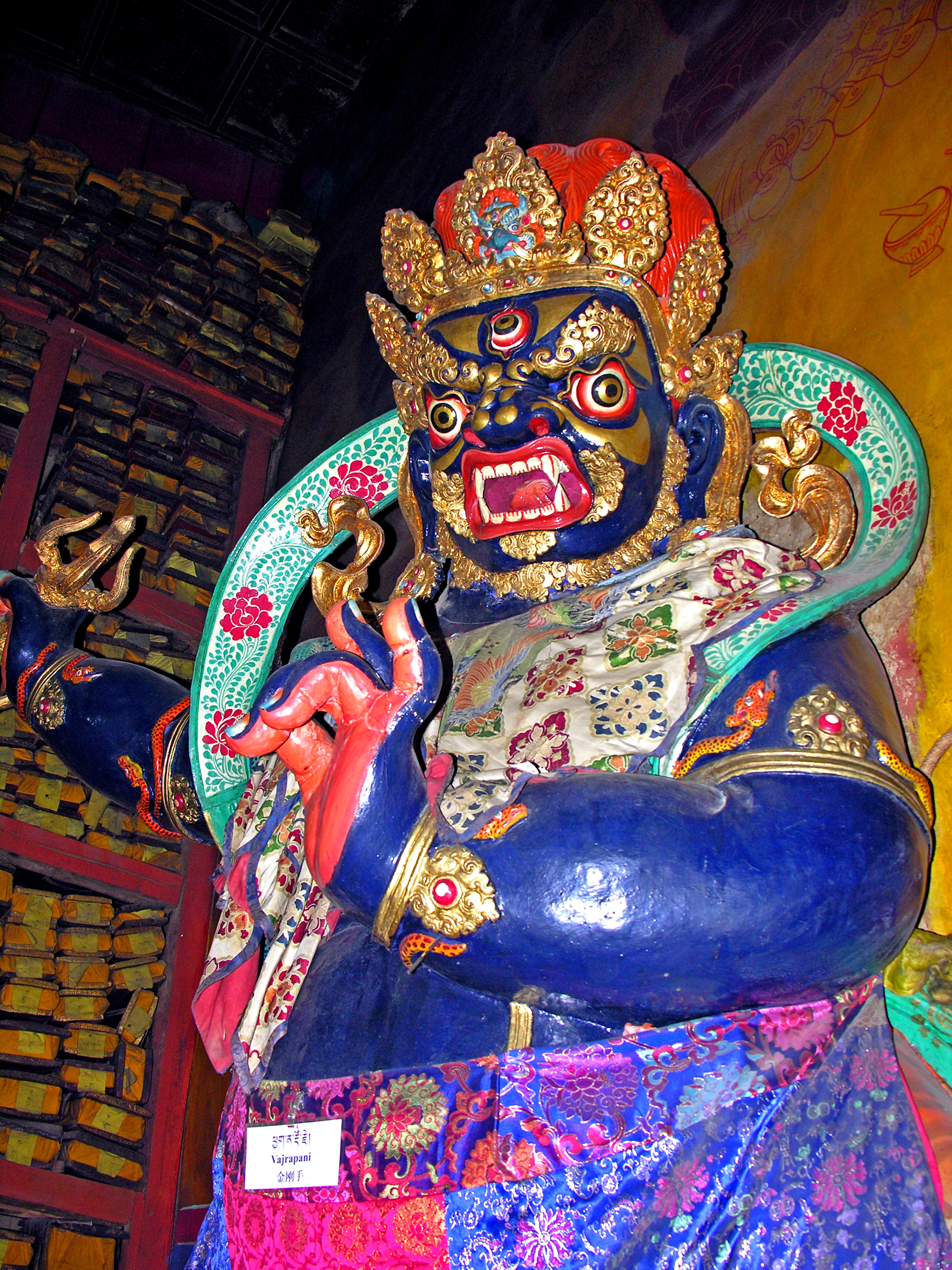
A statue of Vajrapani at the Drepung Monastery in Lhasa, Tibet

Vajrapani has many forms in Tibetan mythology with the main ones being the Dharmapala and the Vajrapani-Acharya. The deity is depicted in human form to possess a single head and a third eye and is wearing a necklace made out of snakes. Nilambara-Vajrapani is depicted as having either four or six hands and as having a head and a third eye wearing a crown of skulls. Mahachakra-Vajrapani is another form of the Vajrapani however unlike the previous forms this form has three heads, six arms, and two legs as well as a third eye and is holding a skull cup in his left hand. Many Buddhist statues as well as artworks depicting this deity is found in many countries including Nepal, Japan, India, and Cambodia.

=== Jampelyang ===
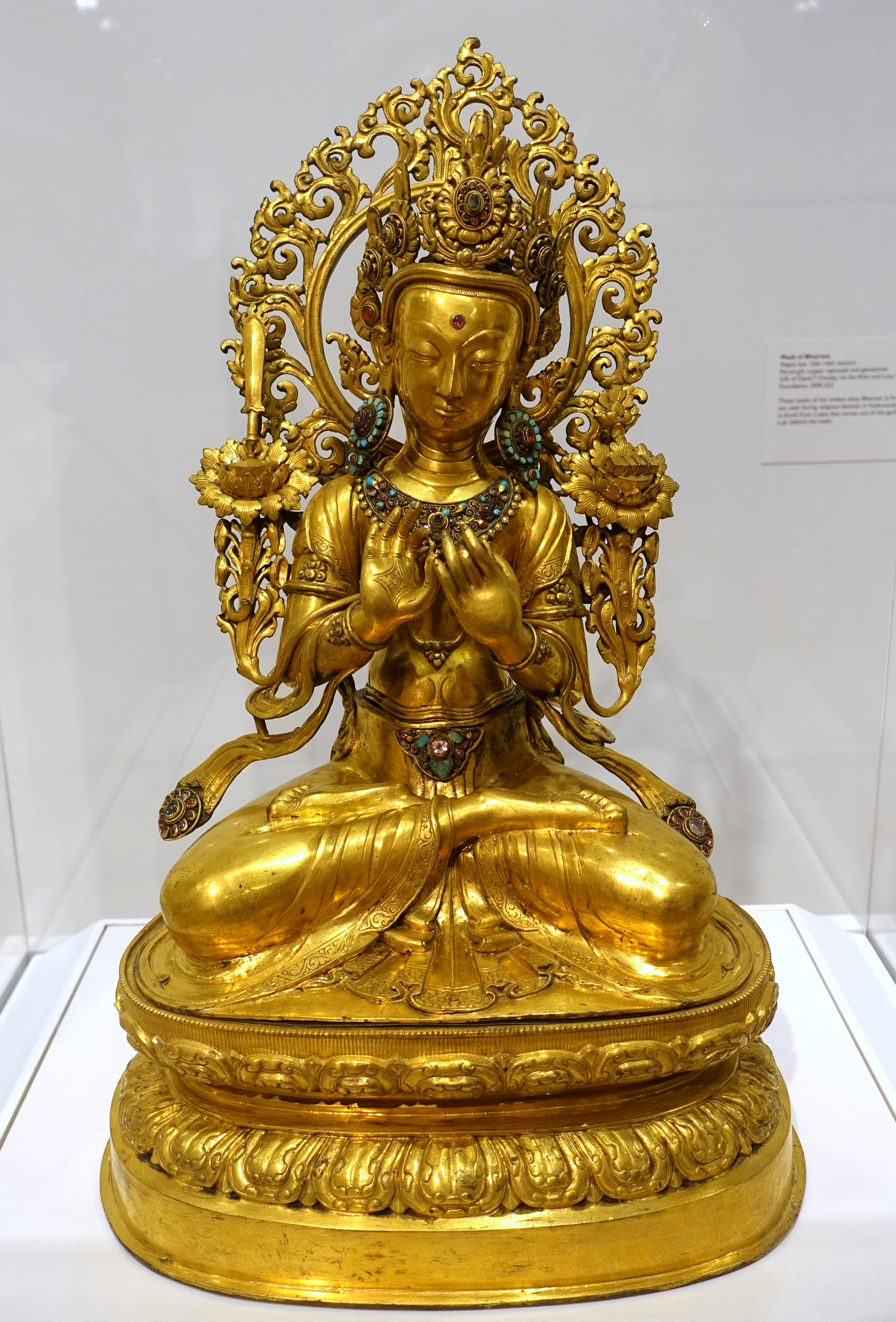
A Tibetan figure of Jampelyang at the Dallas Museum of Art in Dallas, Texas, United States

The Jampelyang also often known as Manjushri is the Bodhisattva of wisdom and insight and within Tibetan mythology is also said to have connections with Vajrayana Buddhism, the traditions of Tantra. Depicted to have been holding a sword in flames in his right hand to cut down ignorance and a lotus in the left hand as a symbol of fully blossomed wisdom. The Jampelyang is often featured in many Buddhist artworks and is often depicted with Chenrezig and Vajrapani as the family protector deities.

== Creatures ==
Different mythical creatures are often featured within Tibetan mythology, ranging from creatures that resemble animals like the snow lion to spirits. These creatures are present in both religious mythology as well as national mythology and are often a result of the Tibetan environment or are shared amongst many countries as a result of the spread of religion.

=== The Yeti ===
The Yeti is one of the most well-known mythical creatures around the world. Tibetan mythology also has a version of the Yeti myth alongside Chinese and Russian myths. The large creature was said to resemble an ape and in recent years this myth has been adapted into different forms, like a kids’ movies such as Abominable or Smallfoot. It was said to have been sighted in the snowy mountains around Tibet with tufts of orange fur and large footsteps being spotted in the snow. The reports of the Yeti in Western media had peaked around the 1950s when pictures were taken of these large footprints in the snow.

=== The snow lion ===
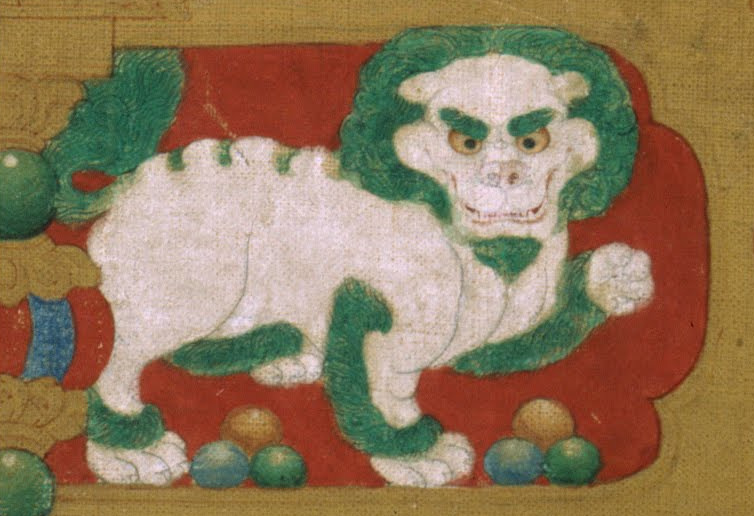
A snow lion on a painting of 9th Karmapa, Wangchuk Dorje

The Snow Lion is a celestial animal and the emblem of Tibet, its appearance is symbolic of the snowy mountain ranges that make up most of Tibet. It is thought to live in the highest mountains and the snow lion often makes appearances in other stories, this makes the snow lion often regarded as the king of beasts. The snow lion was present on coins, banknotes, postage stamps, and even on the national flag of Tibet. The Senggeh Garcham or the snow lion dance is still practiced in areas of Tibet and is a traditional Buddhist dance that is performed by monks. Although vastly popular in Tibet, the snow lion is also present in Buddhism and so statues and art of the snow lion can also be seen within temples in China, Japan, India, and parts of different Himalayan regions.

=== Wind Horse ===
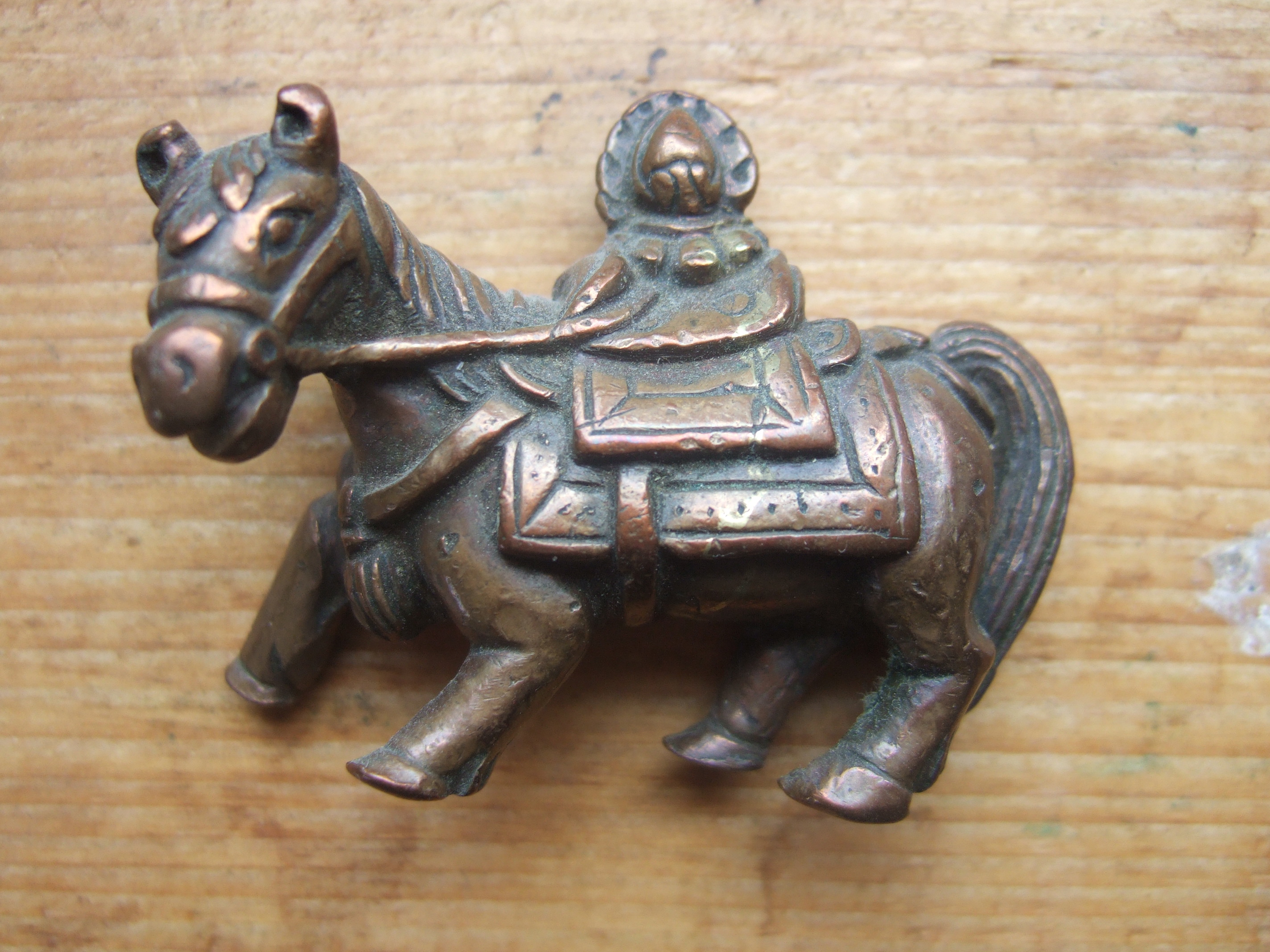
Tibetan bronze figurine of a windhorse with a rider

The Wind Horse stems from Tibetan Buddhism in Tibet. They were thought to be mighty creatures that are able to carry the wishes and prayers of the people to the Gods using the might of the wind. These mythical creatures are often present in prayer flags as a symbol of luck and believed to be able to change aspects of the world. Tibetan prayer flags stem from the Bön religion and are often strung around the mountains in Tibet and the greater Himalayan region in order to bless the regions. The flags are made of cloth and are often brightly colored and strung together with string. These flags for the wind horse are said to increase the positives in life and so are often strung in higher regions of the blessed areas such as treetops.

=== Ghosts ===
Other common Tibetan myths include Tibetan ghosts, this is often due to Buddhism and so there are many similarities to Indian ghost mythology. These include the hungry ghosts who are a symbol of greediness and unfulfillment of the tulpa which is a manifestation of high-ranking monks' wishes. These ghosts are deeply tied to the Tibetan culture with an annual religious ceremony being held near the end of the year for getting rid of all the negative energy, spirits, or bad luck in order to receive the new year.

== See also ==
- Mythology of the Turkic and Mongolian peoples
- Several articles in German Wikipedia de:Kategorie:Tibetische Mythologie
