= Wat Plai Laem =

Wat on the resort island of Ko Samui, Thailand

Coordinates: 9.5716°N 100.0666°E

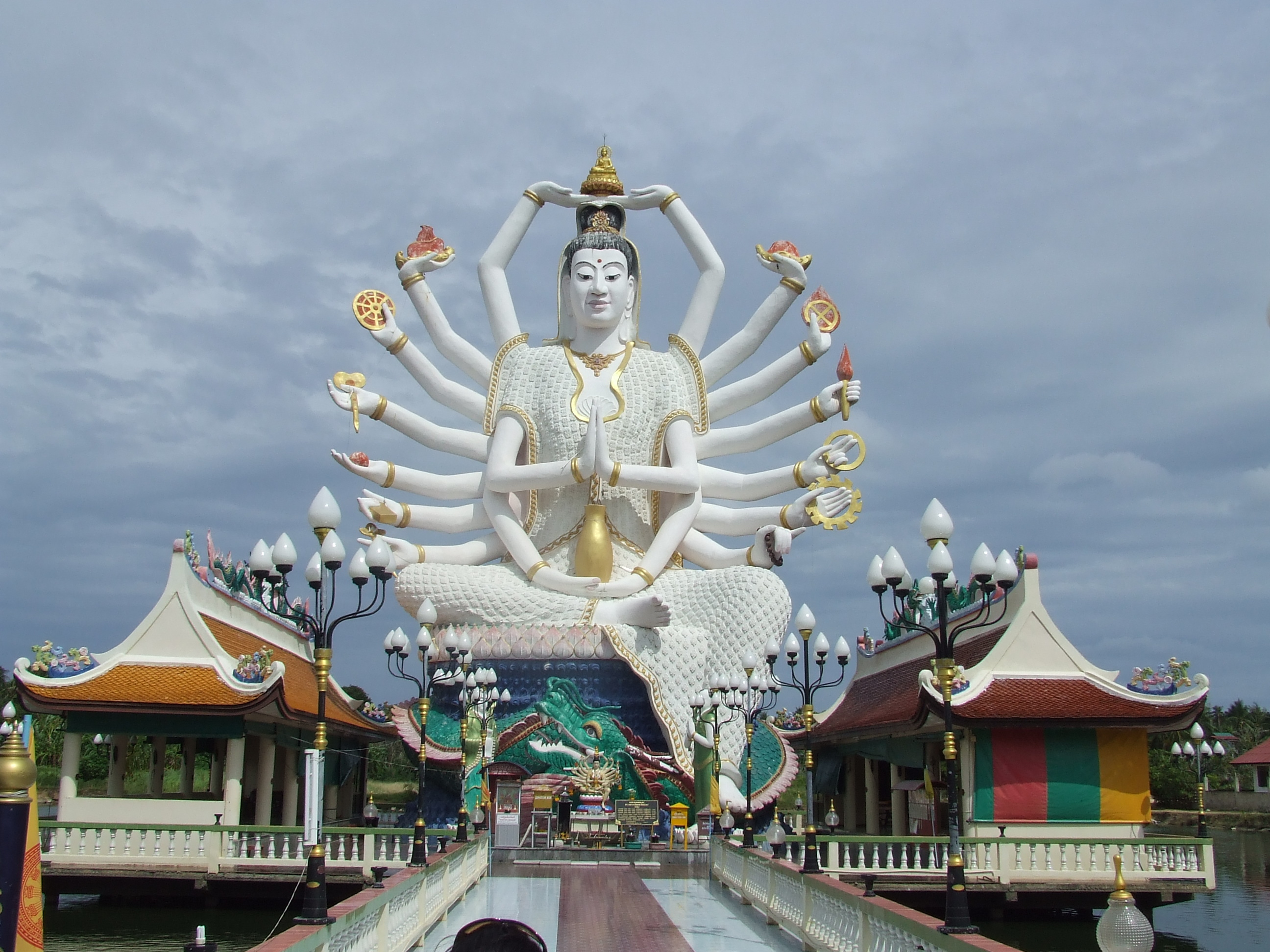
Statue of "Guanyin with eighteen arms" at Wat Plai Laem, Ko Samui

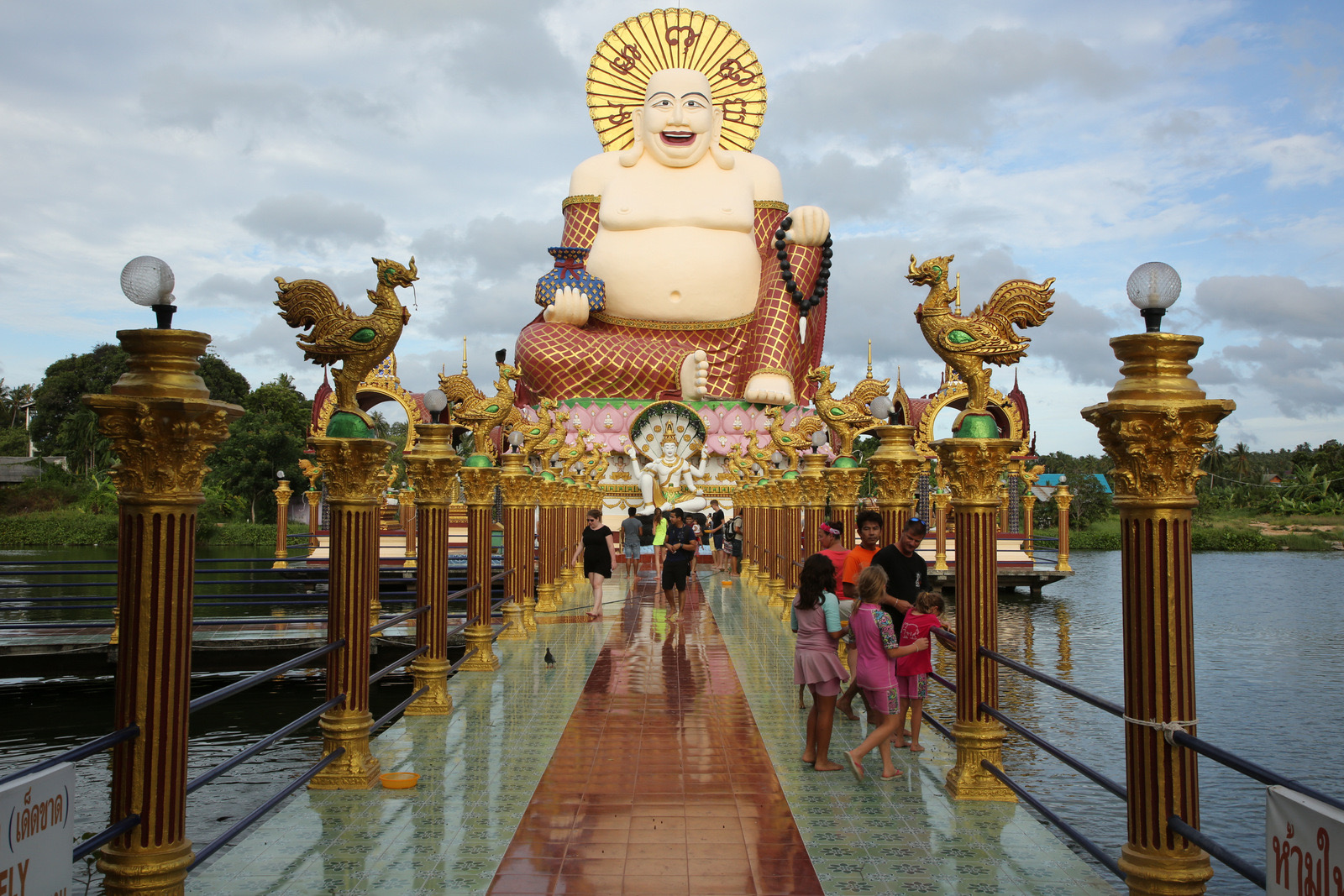
Statue of Budai

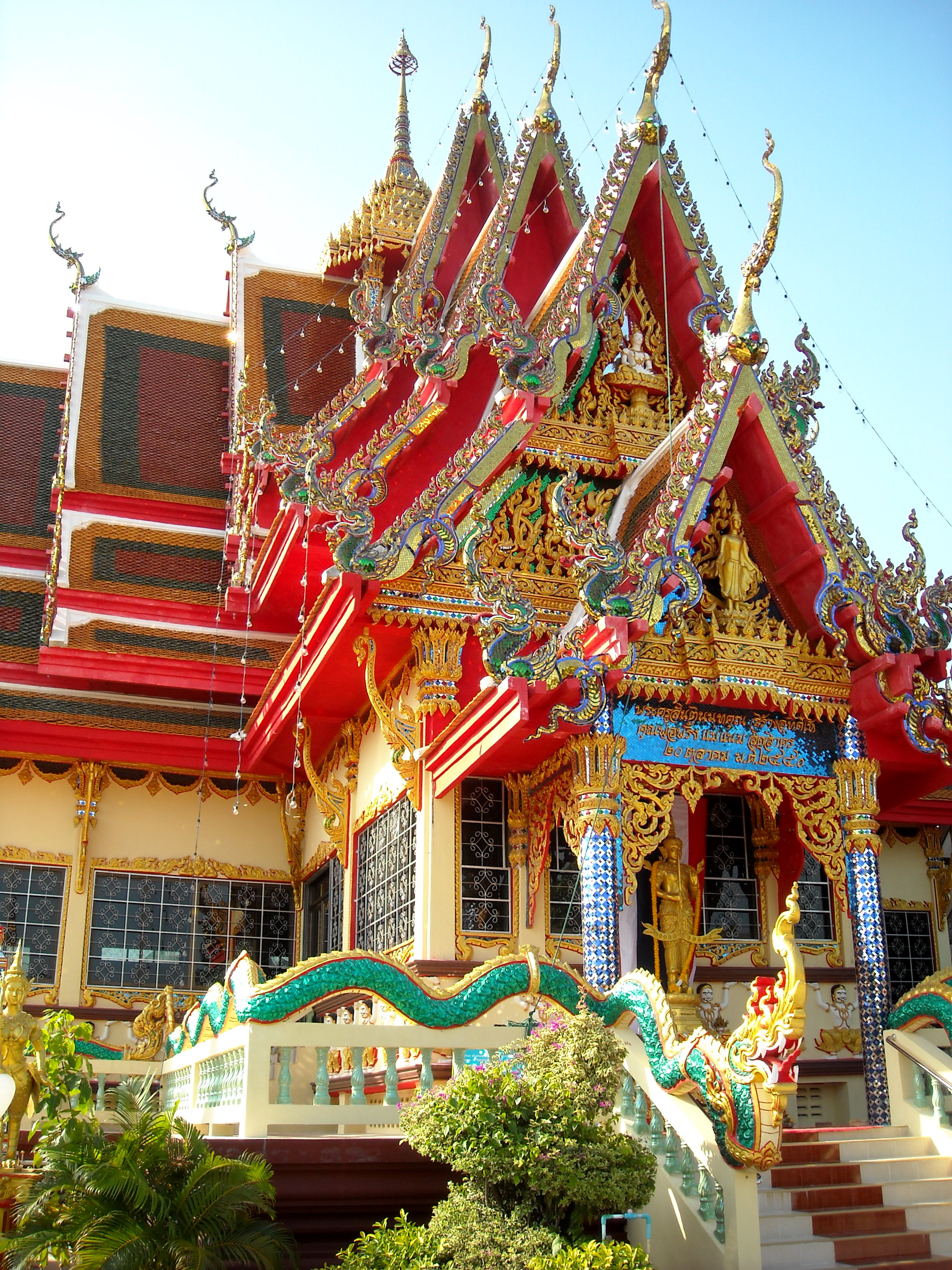
Wat Plai Laem, Ko Samui, Thailand

Wat Plai Laem (Thai: วัดปลายแหลม) is a wat on the resort island of Ko Samui, Thailand. Like the nearby Wat Phra Yai or "Big Buddha Temple", it is a modern Buddhist temple. The temple's design incorporates elements of Chinese and Thai traditions and was in part designed by distinguished Thai artist Jarit Phumdonming. Its main statue, which is in Chinese style, is not of Gautama Buddha. It is a form of the bodhisattva of compassion and mercy, Avalokiteśvara, called Cundi. This form of the deity is known in Chinese as "Guanyin with eighteen arms".

In addition to the main statue, there is also a white statue of Budai and smaller shrines dedicated to Ganesha, Vishnu, Shiva and Sakka.

Although it is an open-air image, it is located within an elaborate ubosot on a platform-pavilion surrounded by a temple lake.

== See also ==
- List of Buddhist temples in Thailand
- Wat Phra Yai
- Wat Khunaram
- Wat Lamai
