= Wat Phra Yai =

Buddhist temple on Ko Samui, Thailand

- วัดพระใหญ่
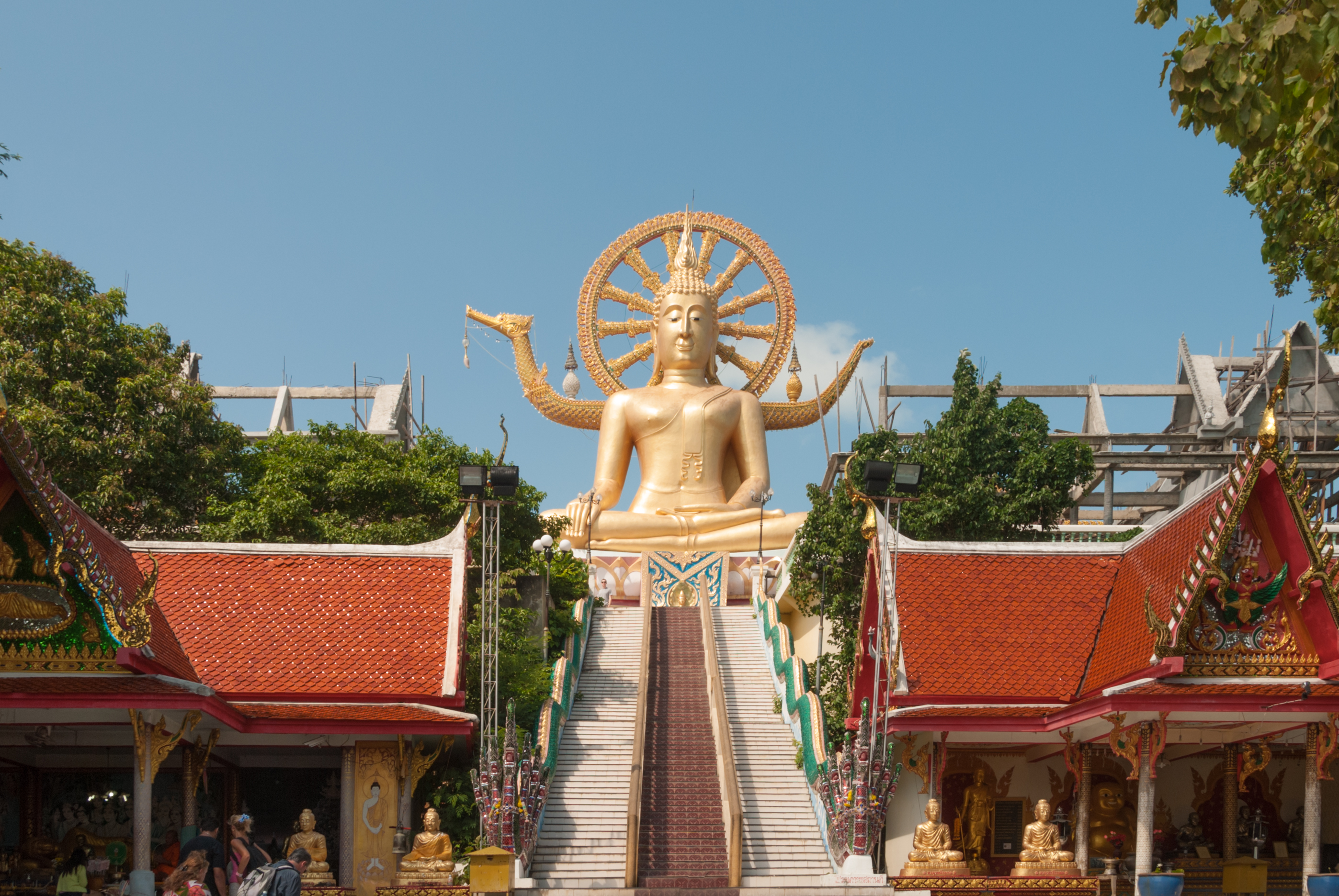

- Location within Thailand

Religion
- Affiliation: Buddhism

Location
- Country: Thailand
- Interactive map of Wat Phra Yai
- Coordinates: 9.570804°N 100.059845°E

Architecture
- Completed: 1972

Wat Phra Yai, known in English as the Big Buddha Temple, is a Buddhist temple on Ko Phan (also spelled Koh Fan or Koh Faan), a small island offshore from the northeastern area of Ko Samui, Thailand, connected to that island by a short causeway 3 kilometres (1.9 miles) north of Samui International Airport. As its name indicates, it is home to a giant, 12-metre-high (39-foot) gold-painted Buddha statue. Since being built in 1972, it has become one of Ko Samui's main tourist attractions and a major landmark.

== Statues ==
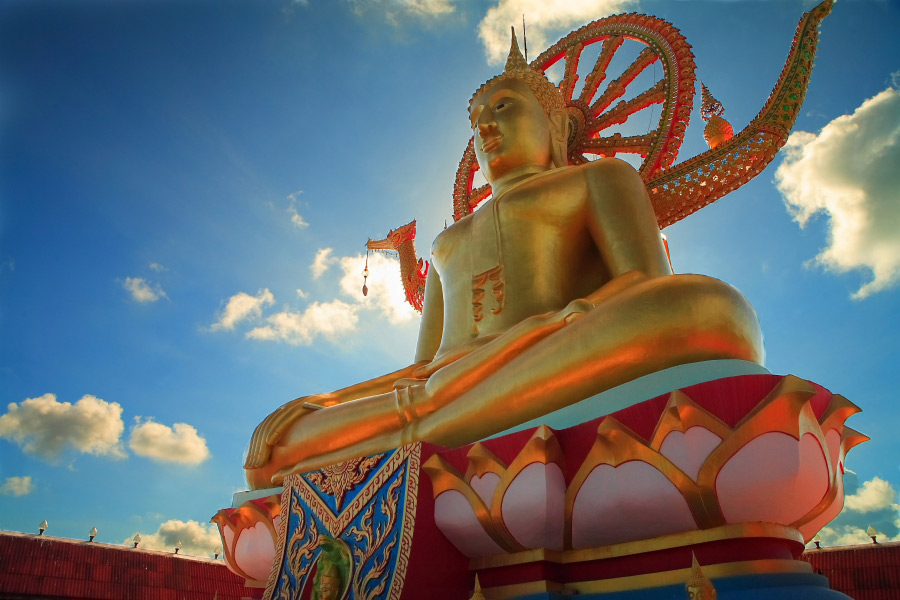
Big Buddha statue

The Buddha statue depicts Buddha in a state of calm and purity and resolve, having overcome temptation and fear sent at him by Mara, Lord of Illusion. Known as the Mara posture, the left hand rests palm open and up in the statue's lap, the right hand facing down over the right knee, almost to the ground.

There is a second, smaller Buddha statue, depicting the Metteyya of the Future and a collection of bells around the temple's rear side.

The temple design has elements of animism, Brahminism and Buddhism in its architecture. As in many Thai temples, nāga statues line the staircase. There is a bazaar within the temple grounds selling tourist items as well as amulets and other Buddhist items.

There are many restaurants and shops around the temple in the area known as Big Buddha Beach (Bang Rak).

== Location ==
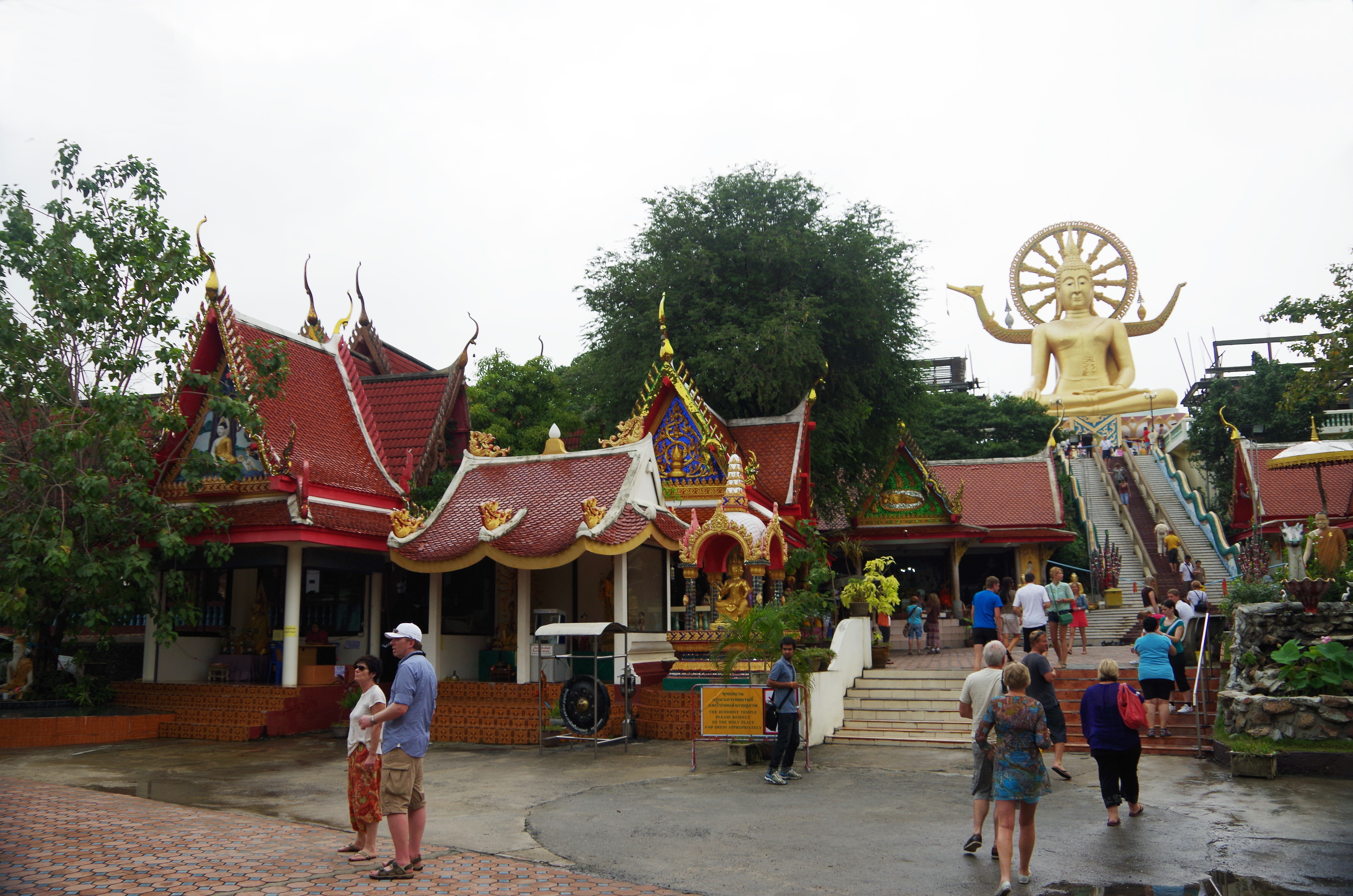
Route to Big Buddha

The Buddha is near a beachtown called Bang Rak, now often called Big Buddha Beach. It is 7.5 km (4.7 mi) northwest from Chaweng and 3 km (1.9 mi) east from Bophut. The temple is located on Thai highway 4171, which is a side route off of Highway 4169, the main route around the island.

== Gallery ==
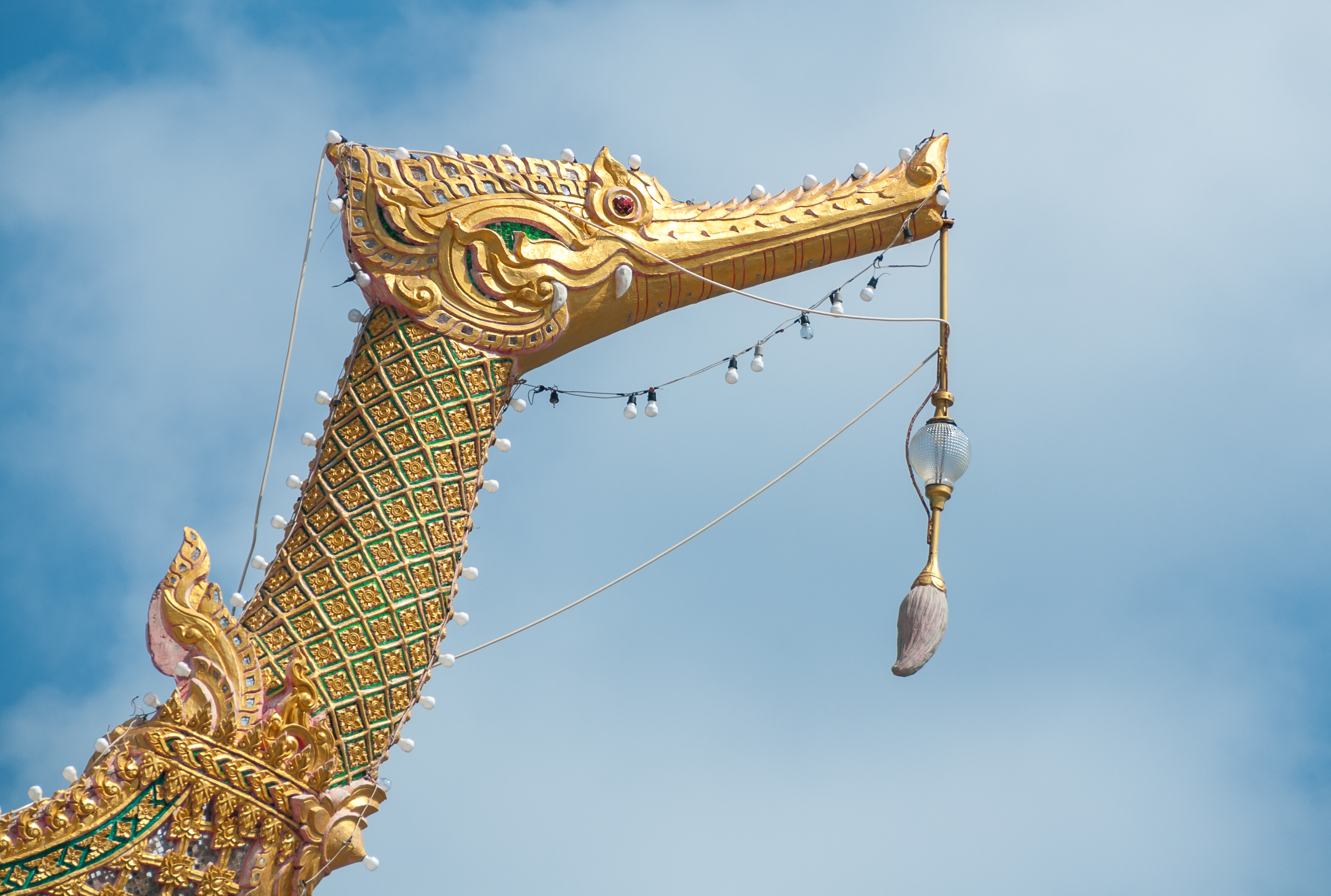
Details of Big Buddha statue at Ko Samui island, Thailand

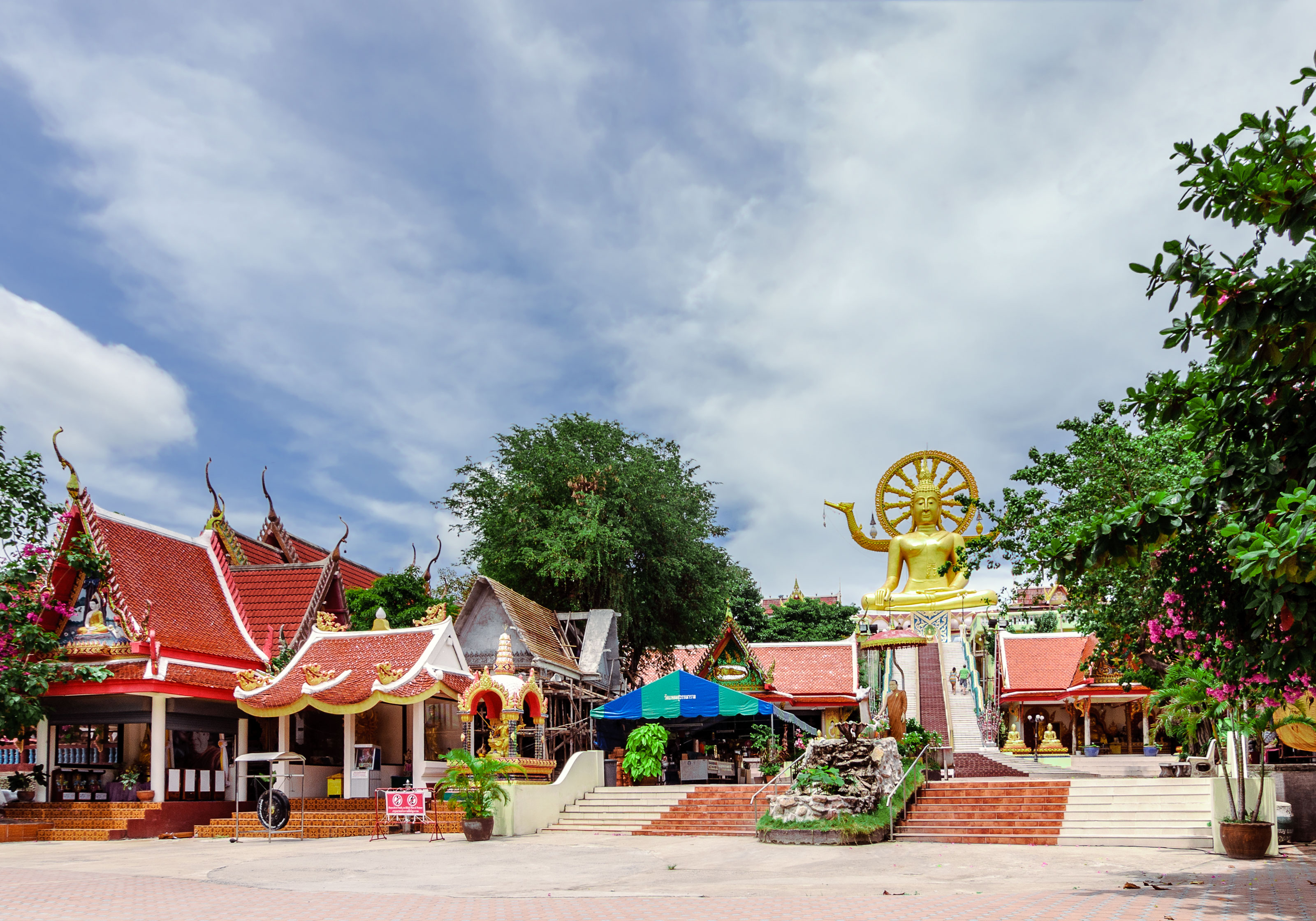

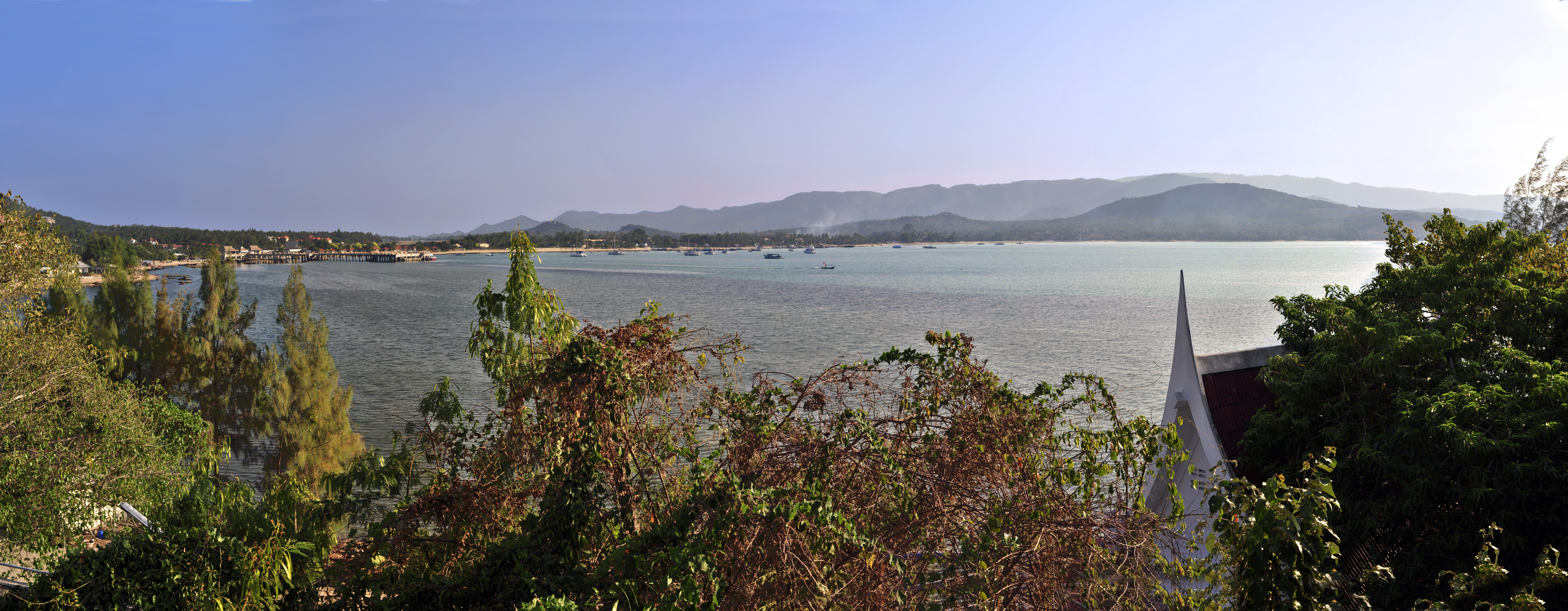
View from Big Buddha Beach

== See also ==
- Buddha images in Thailand
- List of Buddhist temples in Thailand
- Wat Khunaram
- Wat Lamai
- Wat Plai Laem
