= Luang Pho Daeng =

Mummified Buddhist monk (1894–1973)

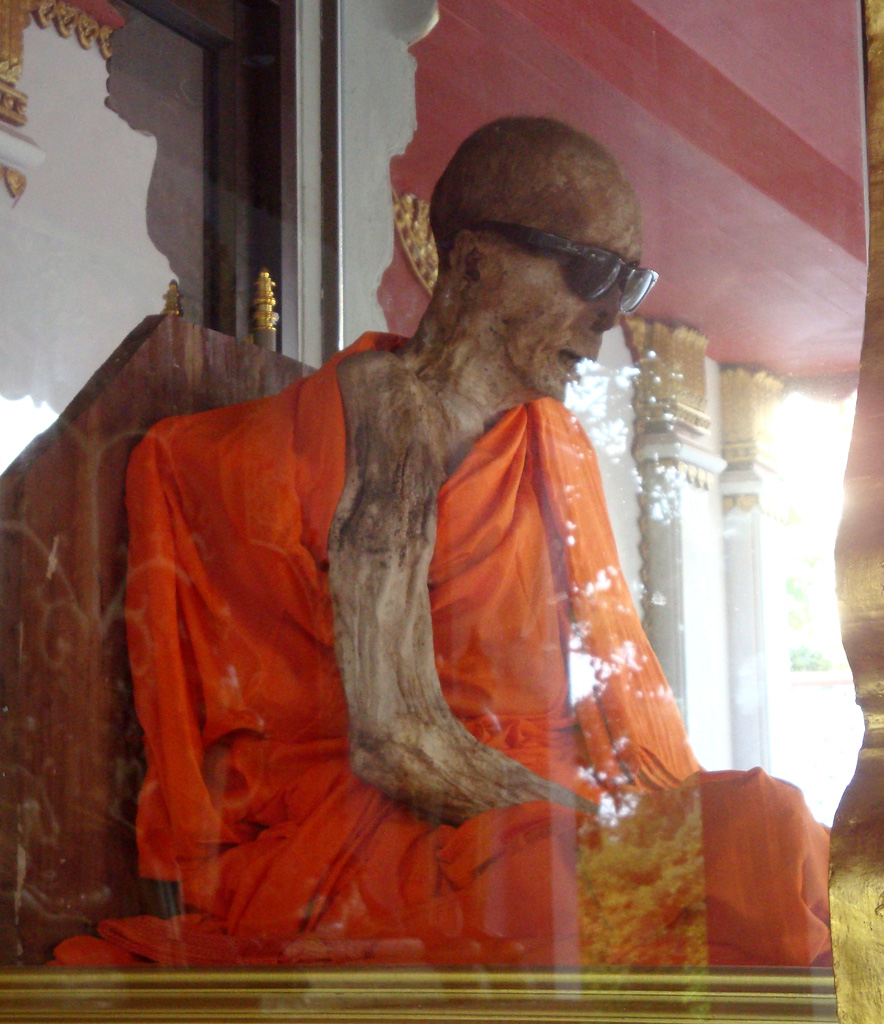
- Daeng's mummy, pictured in 2009
- Born: 1894; Ko Samui, Thailand
- Died: 1973 (aged 78–79); Ko Samui, Thailand
- Resting place: Wat Khunaram, Ko Samui, Thailand; 9.45°N 100.0005°E

Luang Pho Daeng (Thai: หลวงพ่อแดง; born Phra Khru Samathakittikhun) was a Thai Buddhist monk who died while meditating in 1973.

== Biography ==
Daeng was born in 1894 in Ko Samui, an island off the east coast of Thailand. His birth name was Phra Khru Samathakittikhun. He was briefly interested in becoming a monk in his 20s, but decided that he would rather be married instead. He raised six children with his only wife.

However, his first religious experience had profoundly and permanently transformed his character, even after he became a successful businessman. Thus, for several decades, he behaved as a philanthropist, showing great generosity to those in need, offering them money, clothing, and medicine during World War II.

After his children had grown up, at the age of 50 he decided to fulfil his dream and became a monk. He was briefly an abbot at a temple in southern Thailand, but moved to Wat Khunaram near his childhood home. He was particularly interested in meditation techniques such as Samatha-vipassanā. He became a master in this field and taught many monks. It is said that he could go 15 days without eating or drinking. He repeated long periods of fasting, despite the warnings of doctors. He became famous and many pilgrims visited him.

== Death and mummification ==
When Daeng felt that his death was approaching, he gave instructions to those around him so that his body would not decompose. He died while meditating in 1973. He wanted his body to self-mummify, even though it would be a very long process, but ultimately failed to achieve self-mummification. Instead, Daeng's body was preserved by others; he asked for a glass coffin to be built, in which his body would be displayed to the public. Daeng wanted his physical remains to be preserved for posterity.

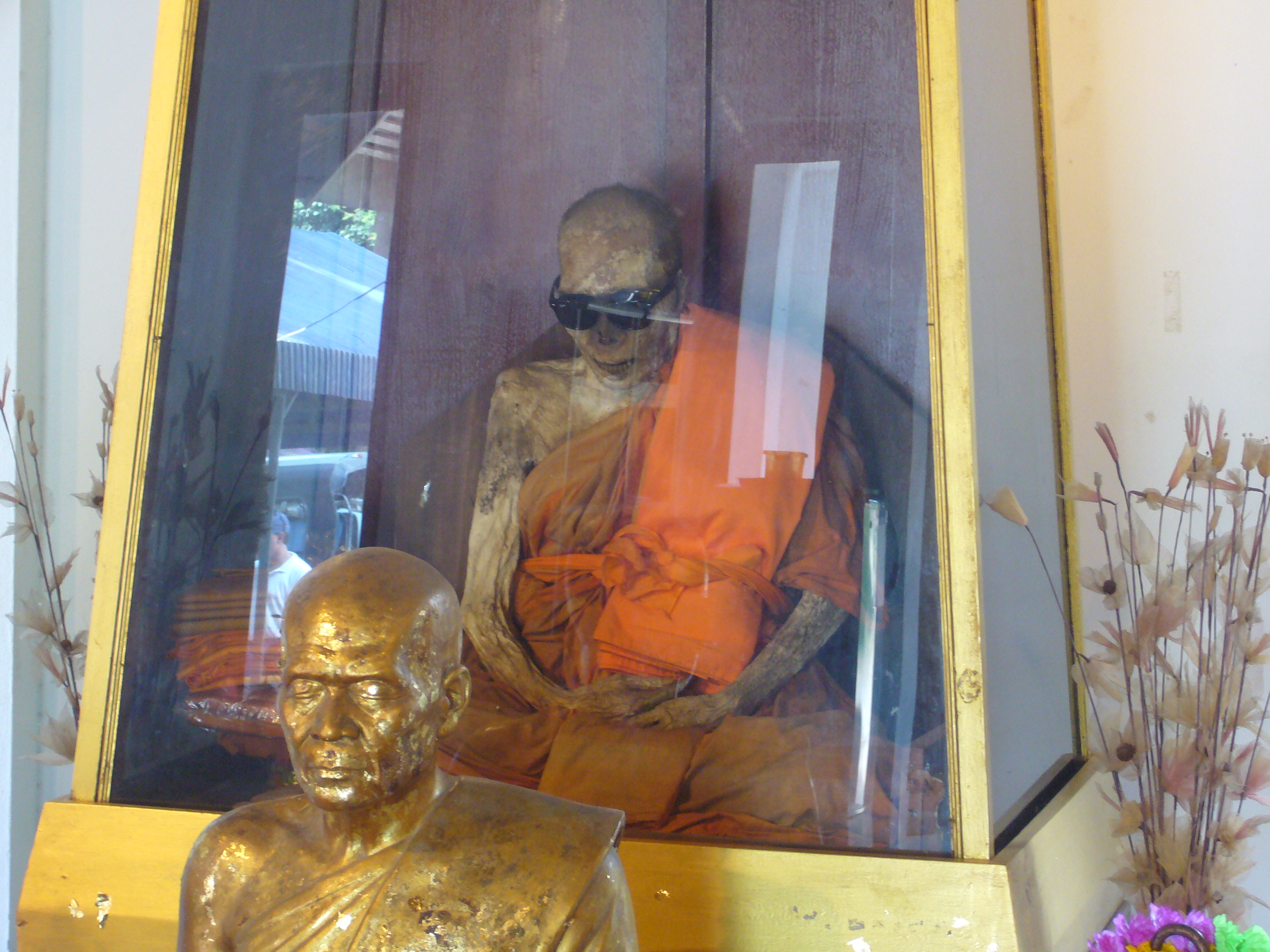
Luang Pho Daeng's mummy in 2015

As early as 2002, researchers from the Bioanthropology Research Institute X-rayed the mummy. They were astonished to find that the organs were still in place, intact, although shrunk due to dehydration. They also discovered that geckos had laid eggs in the mouth, throat, and skull, wherever there was a gap or empty cavity. Only the eyes had rotted. Local monks decided to cover the eye sockets with sunglasses, so that children would not be frightened by visible eye sockets.

The mummy has thus become an attraction that draws many visitors. Some skeptics speculate that the body displayed in the glass case is made of wax, but a report filmed by National Geographic has confirmed that it is indeed a real mummy.

== See also ==
- Buddhist mummy
- Sokushinbutsu
