= Buddhist mummy =

Incorrupt bodies of Buddhist monks and nuns

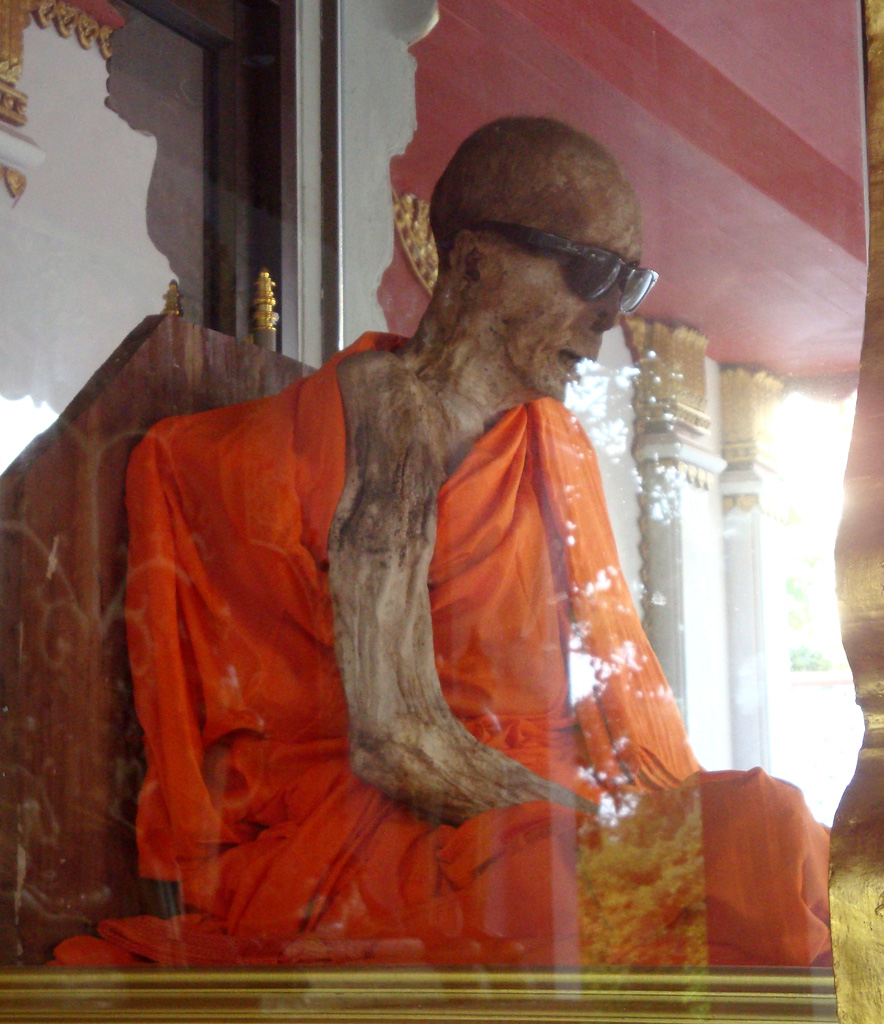
Luang Pho Daeng, a Thai Buddhist monk who died while meditating in 1973.

Buddhist mummies, also called flesh body bodhisattvas, full body sariras, relic bodies, whole-body relics, or living buddhas (Sokushinbutsu) refer to the bodies of Buddhist monks and nuns that remain incorrupt, without any traces of deliberate mummification by another party. Many were destroyed or lost to history. In 2015, the Hungarian Natural History Museum exhibited a Buddhist mummy hidden inside a statue of Buddha, during its first tour outside China.

== History ==
Self-mummification is a common method in China. Examples of monks who practiced this include Tao Wing (道榮) or Yuet Kai (月溪). Some practitioners have covered their own bodies with clay or salt.

The earliest account of a Buddhist mummy dates to the end of the 3rd century, when Heluojie failed to be cremated in traditional Buddhist fashion. In the 4th century, several other Buddhist mummies were reported, those being Shan Daokai, Bo Sengguang, and Zhu Tanyou. However, these instances of self-mummification are thought to have been accidental, rather than intentional. Many early Buddhist mummies were mummified after death. It is believed that the earliest Buddhist mummies were in Central Asia, where humid conditions encouraged the process. One factor in early Buddhist mummification was the rarity of cremation, as the costs associated meant that only abbots and high-ranking monks could be cremated. Lower-ranking monks and the laity were buried in a traditional manner. This created the conditions for Buddhist mummies to be found.

In the 7th century, Xuanzang reported seeing Buddhist mummies during his journeys.

In 1975, a mummy of a Tibetan monk named Sangha Tenzin was found in a stupa in Gue, Himachal Pradesh, in India, 9 kilometres (5.6 mi) from the Tibetan border. The body was estimated to be more than 500 years old. It was also found with a gomtag, which is a traditional Buddhist meditation belt. The process of self-mummification was achieved by the sophisticated practices of meditation, coupled with prolonged starvation and slow self-suffocation using a special belt that connected the neck with his knees in a lotus position.

In 2014, a 1,000 year old mummy was discovered within a Chinese Buddha statue on loan at the Drents Museum. The body is thought to be thought to be the corpse of Liuquan, an ancient Chinese Buddhist who died around A.D. 1100. The mummy inside was discovered after a CT scan of the statue. The process of mummification was not clear, but the internal organs of the mummy had been removed and replaced with Chinese writing and material which was too rotten to identify. Following the discovery, the body was kept in the statue and remained on display in various museums as part of a travelling display.

In 2002, a mummy thought to be a Theravada Buddhist monk was discovered in Mongolia. Ice-chilled mummies have been uncommonly found in Mongolia, but this marked the first potential Buddhist mummy found in the country. Following testing in 2015, the mummy was thought to be about 200 years old. It was also theorized that it may be the body of Dashi-Dorzho Itigilov.

During the Cultural Revolution, many Buddhist mummies in China were destroyed. However, many still survived.

The process of Buddhist mummification is still active in Taiwan. Since the 1950s, five Buddhist monks and one Buddhist nun have been mummified, the most recent of which was in 1997. One of the monks, Cihang, was mummified after death. However, prior to his death, he maintained a strict diet which eased the mummification process. Following his mummification, he was sealed in a large jar. In accordance with his will, three years later, the jar was opened to prove the mummification process had been successful. However, it is still debated whether Cihang's mummy counts as a relic body or not, as he died of a stroke instead of by the self-mummification process. The most recent Buddhist mummy in Taiwan was also the first Buddhist nun to undergo mummification, by the name of Gongga. She died in 1997, while her body was enshrined in 2000. There have also been some instances of failed mummification in Taiwan.

The process of Buddhist mummification has become a contentious issue in Taiwan. It is seen by some as an outdated practice which fails to fit the principle of humanistic Buddhism, while others believe that Buddhist mummification can still play a role in modern Buddhism. Some have attempted to explain the process of Buddhist mummification through scientific means which also comply with Buddhist teachings. Buddhist mummies also play a role in tourism, which encourages some Buddhist shrines to display them. In recent years, new Buddhist mummies have attracted less attention from Buddhist organizations, showing the controversial nature of the process.

== Methods ==
Buddhist self-mummification is a years-long process. Monks typically keep to a strict diet, which includes light plant-based foods, as well as lightly poisonous things such as nuts. They remain in a praying position without moving. This removes body fat and shrinks internal organs to ensure that mummification happens immediately upon death. Buddhist mummies are typically given a several year window to display their mummification. If they fail to decay during this period, they are treated as relics and displayed in Buddhist shrines. Some Buddhist mummies are gilded or encased in Buddha statues. Gilding of Buddhist mummies is done to further preserve them. Buddhist mummies are displayed wearing clothes similar to what they wore in life. Sometimes additional preservatives are added to the body, such as lacquer. Buddhist mummification is found in all sects of Buddhism.

The process of Buddhist self-mummification has been compared to incorruptibility in the Catholic and Orthodox churches.

=== Sokushinbutsu ===
The only fully documented form of Buddhist mummification is Sokushinbutsu (即身仏). This form was practices between the 11th and 19th centuries, after which it was banned. In 1879, the Meiji Emperor banned the process of Sokushinbutsu, classifying it as assisted and religious suicide.

Some Shingon monks in Japan practiced Sokushinbutsu, which caused their own death by adhering to a wood-eating diet consisting of salt, poisonous cycad nuts, seeds, roots, pine bark, and urushi tea. The process removed moisture from the body, acted as a deterrent to flesh-eating insects after death, stripped the body of fat, and shrank internal organs, to ensure immediate mummification upon death. They were then buried alive in a pine-wood box with the only opening being a tube for air, meditating in lotus position and occasionally ringing a bell to signal they were alive. When the bell stopped ringing, the box would be dug up and treated as a buddha, granting favor provided it was preserved.

== See also ==
- Mummy
- List of mummies
- Incorruptibility
- Sokushinbutsu
- Cao Gugu

== Sources ==
- 内藤正敏 (1999/5/10). ミイラ信仰の研究.（京都）法蔵館. ISBN 978-4-8318-7244-9
- 日本ミイラ研究グループ (1993). 日本・中国ミイラ信仰の研究. 平凡社. ISBN 4-582-42002-8
