= Cao Gugu =

Figure venerated at a Buddhist temple in Shanxi

Cao Gugu (Chinese: 曹姑姑; lit. 'Aunt Cao') is a figure venerated at Huiji Temple in Yuanping, Shanxi, China. According to local tradition, she was a girl who helped build the temple and died there at the age of 16. Her remains are said to be preserved inside a clay statue in the temple's Wenshu Hall (文殊殿). Local people worship her as a flesh-bodied bodhisattva (肉身菩薩).

== Legend ==
Cao Gugu is said to have been born in Lianjiagang Village (練家崗村), where Huiji Temple stands. Her original name is unknown. According to local accounts, she was a kind girl who wanted to help when the villagers began building the temple. She offered to carry water for the workers. Every morning, she rose before dawn and filled a large container with enough water for the day's work. Some accounts also say that she helped prepare food for the workers.

The work is said to have made her ill. When the temple was completed, she died there while sitting in meditation. She was said to be only 16 years old. The monks and villagers were grateful for her help and made a statue around her remains. They then placed the statue in the temple for worship.

Another account calls her Cao Shi Lao (曹氏姥) and does not give her age. It also tells how she carried water during the temple's construction and died after the work was completed.

== Statue and worship ==
Cao Gugu's statue is kept in a corner of the Wenshu Hall, the main hall of Huiji Temple. The temple was founded during the Tang dynasty and rebuilt during the Song dynasty. The statue is about one metre tall and shows a woman sitting cross-legged. She has black hair tied up on her head and wears a red shawl.

The statue has a clay covering with human bones inside. Part of the clay around one knee has fallen away, exposing the bone beneath it. Reports of the statue describe the bones as being preserved within the clay figure. It is locally known as a flesh-bodied bodhisattva because of these remains.

Local people continue to worship Cao Gugu for her help in building the temple. Some village women believe that she can answer their prayers. Visitors have also claimed that a faint fragrance comes from her statue.
