= Sangha Tenzin =

Self-mummified Buddhist monk in India

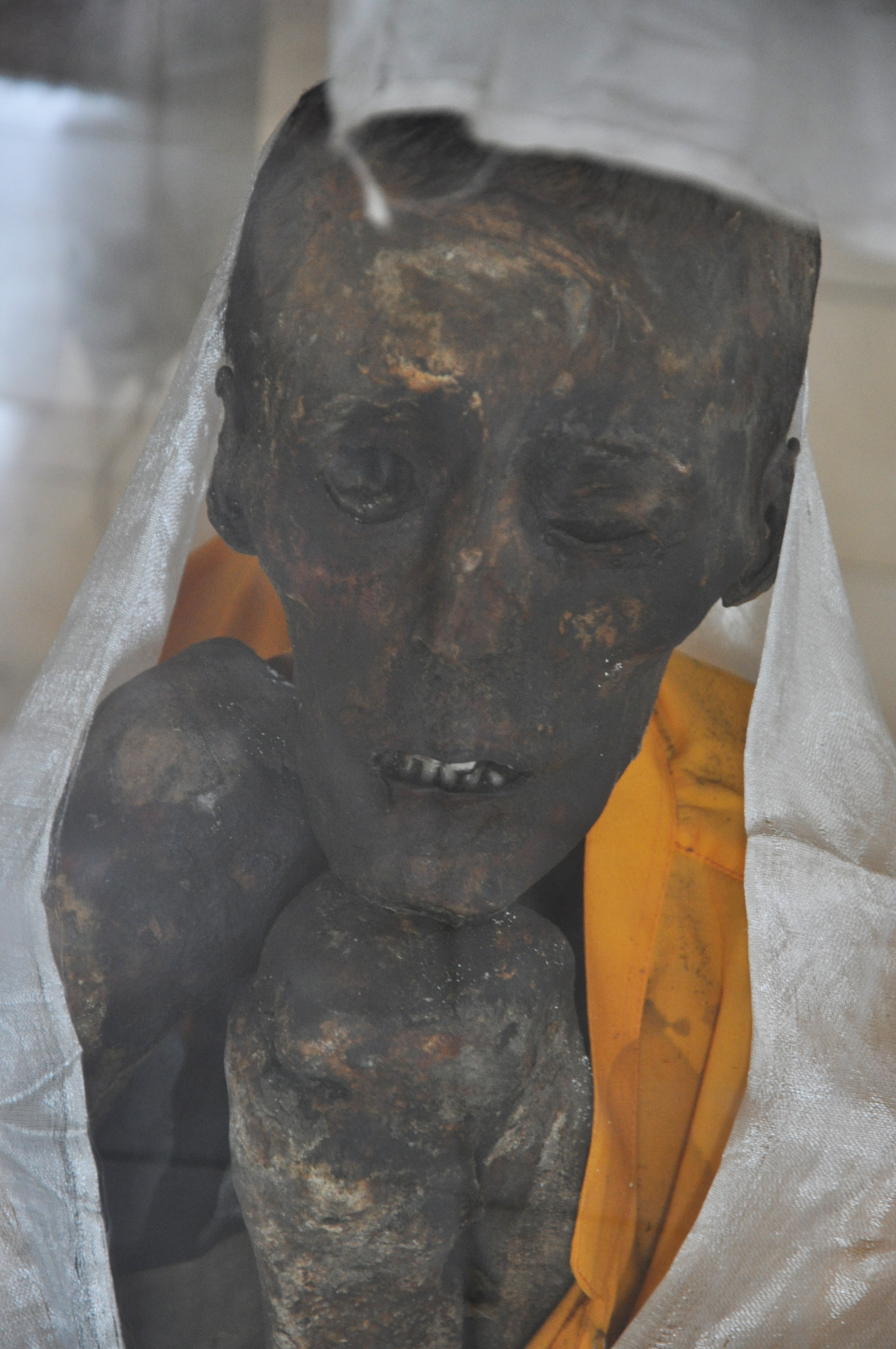
Sangha Tenzin, Monk Mummy of Himalayan region

Lama Sangha Tenzin was a Buddhist monk. He is thought to have died in the 1500s. His remains are preserved as a mummy, which was discovered in 1975 in Gue, a small village in the Spiti valley, Himachal Pradesh, India. Tenzin's tomb was established in the village near the Line of Actual Control (LAC) in the Spiti Valley. His body is the only mummy of a Buddhist monk in India that was self-mummified. However, the mummy was buried in an earthquake, leading the body to be rediscovered by ITBP personnel in 2004 when they were constructing roads in the area. When found, the body was naturally preserved in a thick glass box without the use of chemical preservatives.

Originally from Tibet, Sangha Tenzin came to Gue for meditation when he was 45 years old.

== Folklore ==
According to local folklore, Tenzin sacrificed his life to save the village from a plague of scorpions. It is believed that when Tenzin's soul left his body, a rainbow appeared in the sky and the village was freed from the scorpions forever.

Legend says the mummy is alive and hence became known as "living Buddha", and some local people worship the mummy as a "living god". Legend claims that the hair and nails are still growing. The mummy is self-mummified, meaning that it was not artificially preserved or exposed to chemical preservatives, making it a "natural" mummy. It belongs to a 15th-century Buddhist monastery.
