= Huiji Temple (Yuanping) =

Buddhist temple in Yuanping, Shanxi, China

Huiji Temple (simplified Chinese: 惠济寺; traditional Chinese: 惠濟寺; pinyin: Huìjì Sì) is a Buddhist temple in Lianjiagang Village (练家岗村), Yuanping, Shanxi, China. It was founded during the Tang dynasty and rebuilt during the Song dynasty.

== History ==
The temple was repaired during the Jin, Yuan, Ming and Qing dynasties. It became a protected cultural site of Shanxi Province in 1986. In 2013, it was listed as a Major Historical and Cultural Site Protected at the National Level.

== Buildings and sculptures ==
Huiji Temple covers more than 2,000 square metres and faces south. Its main hall, the Manjushri Hall (文殊殿), contains painted Buddhist sculptures from the Song dynasty. The Guanyin Hall has statues of Guanyin and the Twelve Yuanjue (十二圓覺). Its walls show Guanyin saving people from eight dangers. The western hall contains statues of Samantabhadra and the Eighteen Arhats.

Some statues in the eastern hall were damaged in the past. Government-funded repairs were reported in 2026.

== Cao Gugu ==
The Manjushri Hall also contains a statue of Cao Gugu (曹姑姑). Local tradition says that she helped build the temple by bringing water to the workers every morning. One container of water was said to be enough for a day's work. She died when the temple was completed, and the villagers made a statue of her. An older account calls her Cao Shi Lao (曹氏姥).

The statue is made of clay and is reported to contain human bones. Local people worship Cao Gugu as a flesh-bodied bodhisattva (肉身菩薩). Another version of her story says that she died at the age of 16.
