= Cladh Hallan Mummies =

Bronze Age composite mummies found in Scotland

Coordinates: 57.17116°N 7.40759°W

Composition of the male mummy:blue: male c. 1600 BCyellow: male c. 1500-1400 BC red: male c. 1440-1360 BC

The Cladh Hallan mummies are two composite skeletons discovered in 2001 at Cladh Hallan, a prehistoric settlement on South Uist in Scotland's Outer Hebrides. Each was assembled from the remains of at least three people. Although no preserved skin or other soft tissue survived, analysis of the bones indicated that the bodies had been mummified before their eventual burial beneath a roundhouse floor.

The people whose remains formed the two bodies died during the Bronze Age, at different times between approximately 1600 and 1100 BCE. The composite bodies were buried during the construction of a row of adjoining roundhouses in the eleventh century BCE, long after some of the individuals had died. Changes to the bones suggest that they had previously been exposed to an acidic environment, most likely a peat bog, which helped preserve them.

The remains provided the first evidence of mummification in prehistoric Britain. Their preservation, rearrangement and burial have been interpreted as evidence of an enduring relationship between the living and the dead. Researchers have suggested that combining remains from different people may have brought together ancestral identities or lines of descent, although the purpose of the practice remains uncertain.

== Discovery ==
Archaeological excavations at Cladh Hallan began in 1988. Over the next 14 years, archaeologists working on the South Uist Archaeological Project uncovered preserved floors, walls, middens and outdoor surfaces. Beneath these layers, they found traces of earlier ploughed fields, a Bronze Age burial ground and evidence of earlier occupation.

Near the end of the excavations in 2001, archaeologists believed they had found the remains of four individuals beneath the floors of the Bronze Age roundhouses: two adults and two children.

The adult skeletons were identified as a man and a woman from their skeletal characteristics. The children consisted of a crouched burial estimated to have been between 10 and 14 years old and the largely disarticulated remains of a younger child aged about 18 months to three years.

Because the soft tissue had decomposed, the remains appeared to be ordinary skeletons rather than deliberately preserved bodies. The burials were initially interpreted as representing four individuals who had lived and died during the occupation of the settlement.

== Condition and preservation ==
The Cladh Hallan skeletons differ from most bog bodies in two respects: unlike most bog bodies, they appear to have been put in the bog for the express purpose of preservation (whereas most bog bodies were simply interred in the bog), and unlike most bog bodies, their soft tissue was no longer preserved at the time of discovery.

The high level of the calcareous sand in Cladh Hallan and the Scottish Highlands had been attributed in part to the preservation of the mummies over thousands of years.

== Scientific analysis ==
=== Osteological analysis ===
After the 2001 excavation, researchers examined the physical characteristics of the bones using osteological analysis. One adult skeleton, initially identified as female, contained conflicting features: the pelvis was consistent with an adult female, while the skull and mandible had characteristics more typical of an adult male.

The differences suggested that bones from several people might have been combined. Osteological examination, radiocarbon dating and stable isotope analysis could not resolve the question, leading researchers to compare individual bones using ancient DNA.

=== Ancient DNA analysis ===
In 2012, researchers used ancient DNA analysis to investigate the adult skeleton that had been identified as female. Earlier examination of the bones had produced conflicting results. The pelvis was consistent with an adult female, while the skull and mandible had characteristics more typical of an adult male. Radiocarbon dating and stable isotope analysis could not determine whether the bones belonged to one person or several.

To answer that question, researchers removed small samples from the skull, mandible, right humerus and right femur. DNA was extracted from a molar in the mandible and from the other bone samples under laboratory conditions designed to minimise modern contamination.

The team analysed mitochondrial DNA because it is more likely than nuclear DNA to survive in ancient remains. After excluding DNA sequences likely to represent contamination, they compared the genetic profiles recovered from each bone.

The analysis showed that the mandible, humerus and femur each came from different individuals. Too little DNA was recovered from the skull to determine whether it belonged to one of those individuals or to a fourth person. The study showed that the skeleton was a composite assembled from the remains of multiple people, although the total number of individuals represented could not be determined.

=== Radiocarbon dating ===
Radiocarbon dating showed that the adult male and female died several centuries before they were buried beneath the floors of the Bronze Age roundhouses. The male died around 1600 BCE and the female around 1300 BCE, but neither was buried until approximately 1120 BCE. This meant that the male's remains were kept for about 500 years, while the female's were kept for roughly 180 years before their final burial. Such a long interval between death and burial indicated that the bodies had not been interred immediately after death.

Combined with evidence of limited demineralisation of the outer layers of the bones, the radiocarbon dates supported the conclusion that the bodies had been placed in a peat bog for approximately 6 to 18 months shortly after death. They were then recovered from the bog and kept for generations before being buried beneath the houses.

== Deposition ==
The two composite mummies were buried in separate graves beneath the floor of one of the roundhouses. This was the northernmost of three adjoining houses built between 1095 and 1015 BCE, about 3,000 years ago. Archaeologist Mike Parker Pearson's 2023 reassessment concluded that the bodies were most likely buried during construction, after the builders had dug out the hollows for the houses but before they laid the floors. The male composite was placed beneath the northeastern part of the house, tightly curled up, with bones from different people arranged to form a single body. The female–male composite was buried beneath the southern part of the same floor.

The female–male composite lay on its left side with its legs drawn towards its chest. Large stones filled the grave, including a broken piece of a saddle quern, a stone used to grind grain. Its right leg lay over the left, which was missing its knee. Parts of that knee and the right wrist were found in another pit about 5 metres (16 ft) away, outside the house and south of its east-facing doorway. The upper shinbone and lower thighbone were still positioned together as a knee joint. These bones had broken when they were already dry, long after death. Because the right leg still covered the missing left knee, researchers concluded that the knee had been removed before the body was placed in its final grave.

In Parker Pearson's reconstruction, the outside pit was the female's earlier grave. Her preserved body was taken out about a century after burial, leaving the broken knee behind. Her head was then replaced with an older male head, and her right arm with an arm from a third person, before the assembled body was buried beneath the house. This proposed sequence would explain both the separate knee deposit and the mixture of individuals represented in the final burial.

== See also ==
- List of bog bodies from Great Britain
