= Huiji Temple (Nanjing) =

Buddhist temple in Jiangsu, China

- 惠济寺
- Location within Jiangsu Location within China

Religion
- Affiliation: Buddhism
- Deity: Chan Buddhism
- Leadership: Langming (朗明)

Location
- Location: Pukou District, Nanjing, Jiangsu
- Country: China
- Interactive map of Huiji Temple
- Coordinates: 32°06′08″N 118°31′16″E

Architecture
- Style: Chinese architecture
- Established: Southern and Northern dynasties (420–589)
- Completed: 19th century (reconstruction)

Website
- www.huijisi.com/web/huijisi/index

Huiji Temple (simplified Chinese: 惠济寺; traditional Chinese: 惠濟寺; pinyin: Huìjì Sì) is a Buddhist temple located in Pukou District of Nanjing, Jiangsu, China.

== History ==
=== Southern and Northern dynasties ===
Originally built in the Southern and Northern dynasties (420–589), the temple was called "Tangquan Chanyuan" (汤泉禅院).

=== Song dynasty ===
In the early Song dynasty (960–1276), the temple was renamed "Huiji Yuan" (惠济院). During the reign of Emperor Shenzong (1048–1085), Zhaoqing (昭庆) settled at the temple. At the same time, Sun Jue (孙觉), Qin Guan and monk Canliao (参寥) visited the temple and Qin Guan wrote a famous article named A Record of Touring Tangquan (游汤泉记).

=== Ming dynasty ===
After the establishment of the Ming dynasty (1368–1644), Hongwu Emperor toured Tangquan Town where the temple located. Due to the social taboo of "Tang" (汤), its name was changed to "Xiangquan Temple" (香泉寺).

=== Qing dynasty ===
During the Xianfeng era (1851–1861) of the Qing dynasty (1644–1911), the temple was badly damaged in the war between the Qing army and Taiping Rebellion. Then the temple was restored in the Guangxu period (1871–1908).

=== People's Republic of China ===
A large-scale reconstruction began in 2014.

== Ginkgo tree ==
There are three millennial ginkgo trees in the temple.
