= Sokushinbutsu =

Buddhist mummification

Sokushinbutsu (即身仏) is a type of Buddhist mummy. In Japan the term refers to the practice of Buddhist monks observing asceticism to the point of death and entering mummification while still alive. Although mummified monks are seen in a number of Buddhist countries, especially in Southeast Asia where monks are mummified after dying of natural causes, it is believed that it is only in Japan where monks have induced their own deaths by starvation.

There is a common suggestion that Shingon school founder Kūkai brought this practice to Japan from Tang dynasty China as part of secret tantric practices he learned. During the 20th century, Japanese scholars found very little evidence of live burial or dochū nyūjō. They rather concluded that mummification took place after the demise of the monk practising this kind of asceticism, as seen in Southeast Asian lands.

== Origin ==
There is at least one "self-mummified" 550-year-old corpse in existence: that of a Buddhist monk named Sangha Tenzin in a northern Himalayan region of India, visible in a temple in Gue village, Spiti, Himachal Pradesh. This mummy was rediscovered in 1975 when the old stupa preserving it collapsed, and it is estimated to be from about the 14th century. The monk was likely a Tibetan dzogpa-chenpo practitioner. Similar mummies have been found in Tibet and East Asia. The cold weather and aridity of the area facilitated the preservation of the mummy for at least five centuries.

According to Paul Williams, the sokushinbutsu ascetic practices of Shugendō were likely inspired by Kūkai, the founder of Shingon Buddhism, who ended his life by reducing and then stopping intake of food and water, while continuing to meditate and chant Buddhist mantras. Ascetic self-mummification practices are also recorded in China and associated with the Chan tradition there. Alternate ascetic practices similar to sokushinbutsu are also known, such as public self-immolation practice in China. This was considered as evidence of a renunciant bodhisattva.

== Japan ==
In the 7th century, a mountain-worshipping religion called Shugendō emerged in Japan as a syncretism between Vajrayana Buddhism, Shinto and Taoism, which stressed ascetic practices. One of these practices was sokushinbutsu (or sokushin jobutsu), connoting mountain austerities in order to attain Enlightenment in a single lifetime. This practice was perfected over a period of time, particularly in the Three Mountains of Dewa region of Japan, that is the Haguro, Gassan and Yudono mountains. These mountains remain sacred in the Shugendō tradition to this day, and ascetic austerities continue to be performed in the valleys and mountain range in this area.

In medieval Japan, this tradition developed a process for sokushinbutsu, which a monk completed over about 3,000 days. It involved a strict diet called mokujiki (literally, 'eating a tree'); the monk abstained from any cereals or cooked foods and relied on pine needles, resins, and seeds found in the mountains, which would eliminate all fat in the body. Increasing rates of fasting and meditation would lead to starvation. The monks would slowly reduce then stop liquid intake, thus dehydrating the body and shrinking all organs. The monks would die in a state of jhana (meditation) while chanting the nenbutsu (a recitation of the Buddha Amitabha's name in remembrance of him), and their body would become naturally preserved as a mummy with skin and teeth intact without decay and without the need of any artificial preservatives. Many Buddhist sokushinbutsu mummies have been found in northern Japan and are estimated to be centuries old, while texts suggest that hundreds of these cases are buried in the stupas and mountains of Japan. These mummies have been revered and venerated by the laypeople of Buddhism.

One of the altars in the Honmyō-ji temple of Yamagata Prefecture continues to preserve one of the oldest mummies—that of the sokushinbutsu ascetic named Honmyōkai. This process of self-mummification was mainly practiced in Yamagata in Northern Japan between the 11th and 19th century, by members of the Japanese Vajrayana school of Buddhism called Shingon ("True Word"). The practitioners of sokushinbutsu did not view this practice as an act of suicide, but rather as a form of further enlightenment.

Emperor Meiji banned and criminalized this practice in 1877, viewing it as "anachronistic and depraved". However, in 1903, a Buddhist monk named Bukkai succeeded in transforming into a sokushinbutsu, becoming the last person in Japan to do so. Bukkai's remains were later exhumed by researchers at Tohoku University in 1961 and now rest in Kanzeon-ji, Fukuoka.

== In popular culture ==
- The practice was satirized in the story "The Destiny That Spanned Two Lifetimes" by Ueda Akinari, in which such a monk was found centuries later and resuscitated. The story appears in the collection Harusame Monogatari.
- In the video game Sekiro: Shadows Die Twice by FromSoftware (2019), the player character can see monks specifically undergoing a form of this process in a twisted search of a form of immortality. The game specifically has a region called Shugendo, named after the religion, with obvious connotations.

== See also ==
- Bog bodies – Corpse preserved in a bog
- Embalming – Method of preserving human remains
- Immured anchorite – Tibetan monk
- Incorruptibility – Supposed miraculous preservation of the corpses of some Catholic and Orthodox saints
- Mellified man – Legendary medicinal substance, made of a human corpse preserved in honey
- Plastination – Technique used in anatomy to preserve bodies or body parts
- Prayopavesa – Hindu practice of suicide by fasting
- Rainbow body – Level of realization within Tibetan Buddhism
- Sallekhana – Voluntarily fasting to death in Jainism
- Meivazhi – Syncretic monotheistic religion
