= Incorruptibility =

Supposed miraculous preservation of the corpses of some Catholic and Orthodox saints

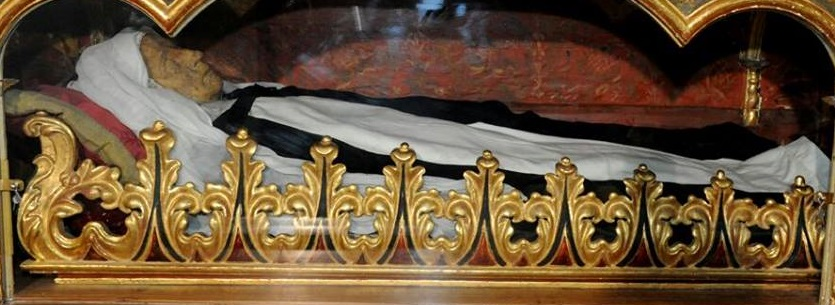
The body of Mary of Jesus de León y Delgado (1643–1731), Monastery of St. Catherine of Siena, found to be incorrupt by the Catholic Church (Tenerife, Spain)

Incorruptibility is a Catholic and Orthodox belief that divine intervention allows some human bodies (specifically saints and beati) to completely or partially avoid the normal process of decomposition after death as a sign of their holiness.

Incorruptibility is thought to occur even in the presence of factors which normally hasten decomposition, as in the cases of saints Catherine of Genoa, Julie Billiart and Francis Xavier.

== Catholicism ==
In Catholicism, if a body is judged as incorruptible after death, this is most often seen as a sign that the individual is a saint. Canon law allows inspection of the body so that relics can be taken and sent to Rome.

The relics must be sealed with wax and the body must be replaced after inspection. These ritual inspections are performed very rarely and can only be performed by a bishop according to the requirements of canon law. A pontifical commission can authorize inspection of the relics and demand a written report. After solemn inspection of the relics, it can be decided that the body be presented in an open reliquary and displayed for veneration. Catholic law allows saints to be buried under the altar, so Mass can be celebrated above the remains.

It is possible that only part of a body may be incorrupt. In the case of Anthony of Padua, only his tongue and jaw were preserved, the rest of the body having decomposed. Bonaventure, one of the men who originally exhumed the corpse in 1263, saw this as a sign that Anthony was a "messenger of God's love". Likewise, one hagiography attributes the tongue's preservation to the "perfection of the teachings formed upon it".

However, according to The Tablet, a Catholic international weekly review, incorruptible saints are deliberately preserved in such a state using wax and silicone. Monsignor Robert Sarno, a priest, also stated the belief in incorruptibility is false and the body may be slow to decay due to environmental conditions and other discoveries about decomposition from modern science.

=== Evaluation ===
Incorruptibility is seen as distinct from the good preservation of a body, or from mummification. Incorruptible bodies are often said to have the odour of sanctity, exuding a sweet or floral, pleasant aroma.

Not every saint is expected to have an incorruptible corpse. Although believers see incorruptibility as supernatural, it is no longer counted as a miracle in the recognition of a saint.

Embalmed bodies are not recognized as incorruptibles. For example, although the body of Pope John XXIII remained in a remarkably intact state after its exhumation, Church officials remarked that the body had been embalmed and additionally that there was a lack of oxygen in his sealed triple coffin.

=== Saints ===
The remains of Bernadette Soubirous were inspected multiple times, and reports by the church tribunal confirmed that the body was preserved. The opening of the coffin was attended by multiple canons, the mayor and the bishop in 1919, and repeated in 1925. However, the face and hands were covered with a wax mask.

The partial remains of Teresa of Ávila held at Alba de Tormes were examined in 1914 and pronounced "completely incorrupt" as in 1750 by the Diocese of Ávila. They were re-examined in 2024 and proclaimed "in the same condition" as in 1914 by the postulator general of the Discalced Carmelite Order.

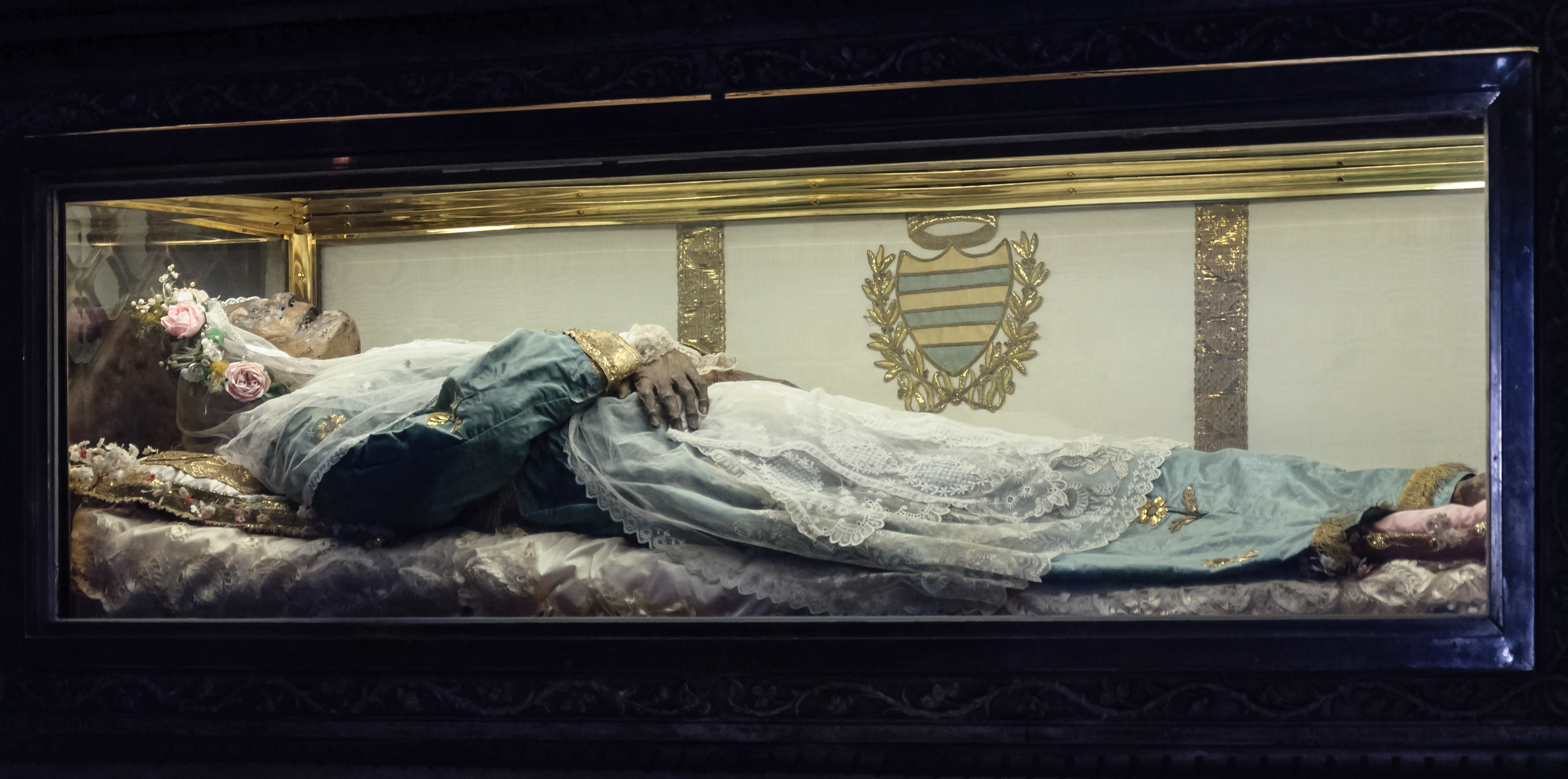
The body of Saint Zita, found to be incorrupt by the Catholic Church (c. 1218 – April 27, 1272)

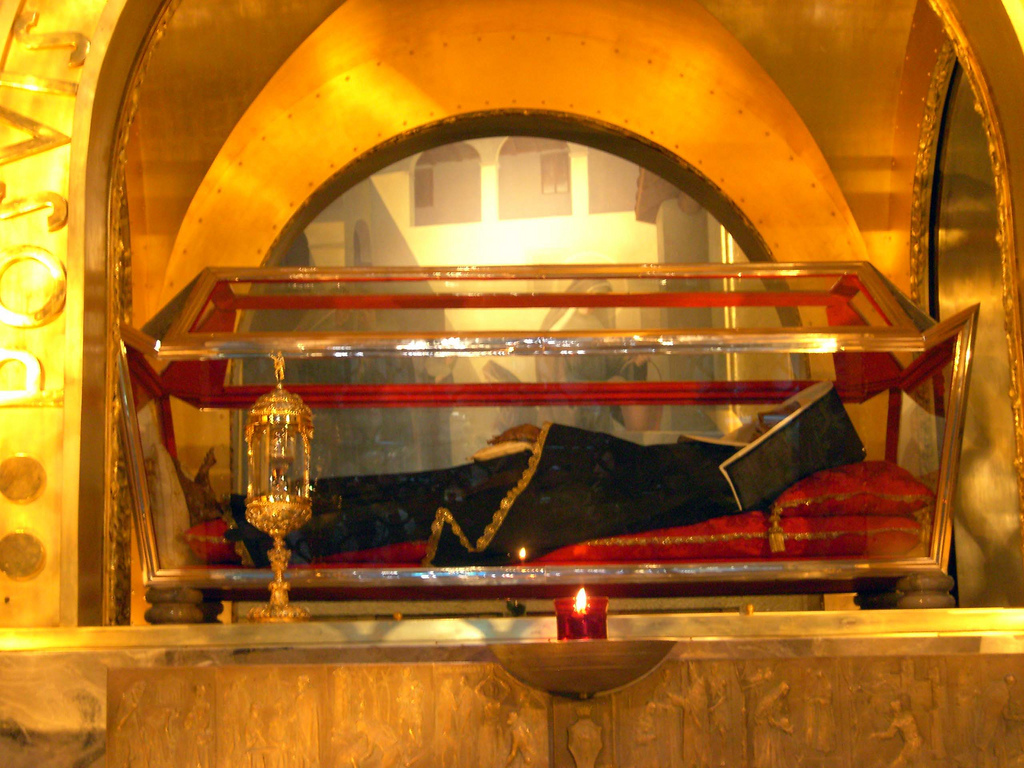
The body of Saint Rita of Cascia, found to be incorrupt by the Catholic Church (1381 – May 22, 1457)

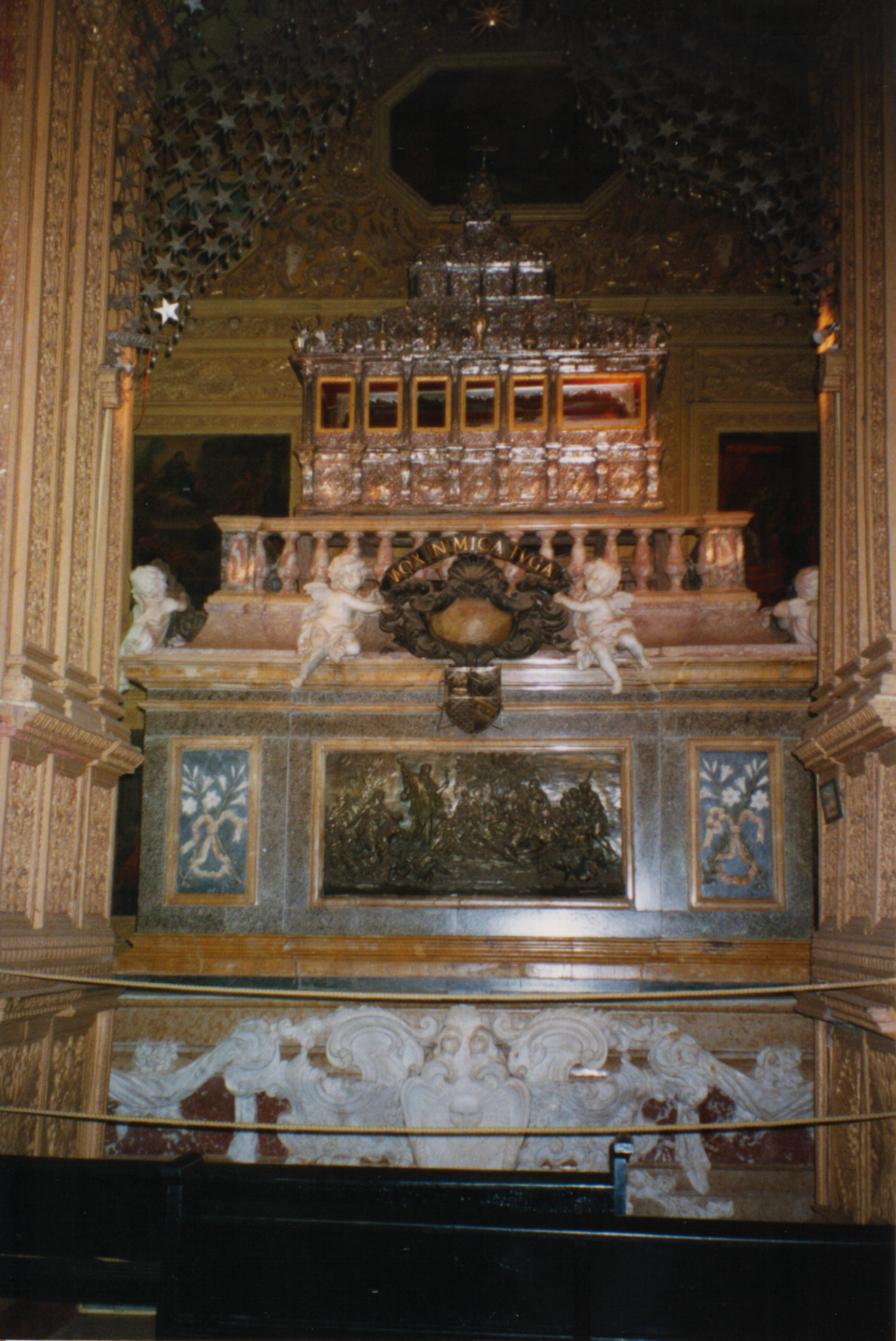
Casket of Saint Francis Xavier in the Basilica of Bom Jesus in Goa, India

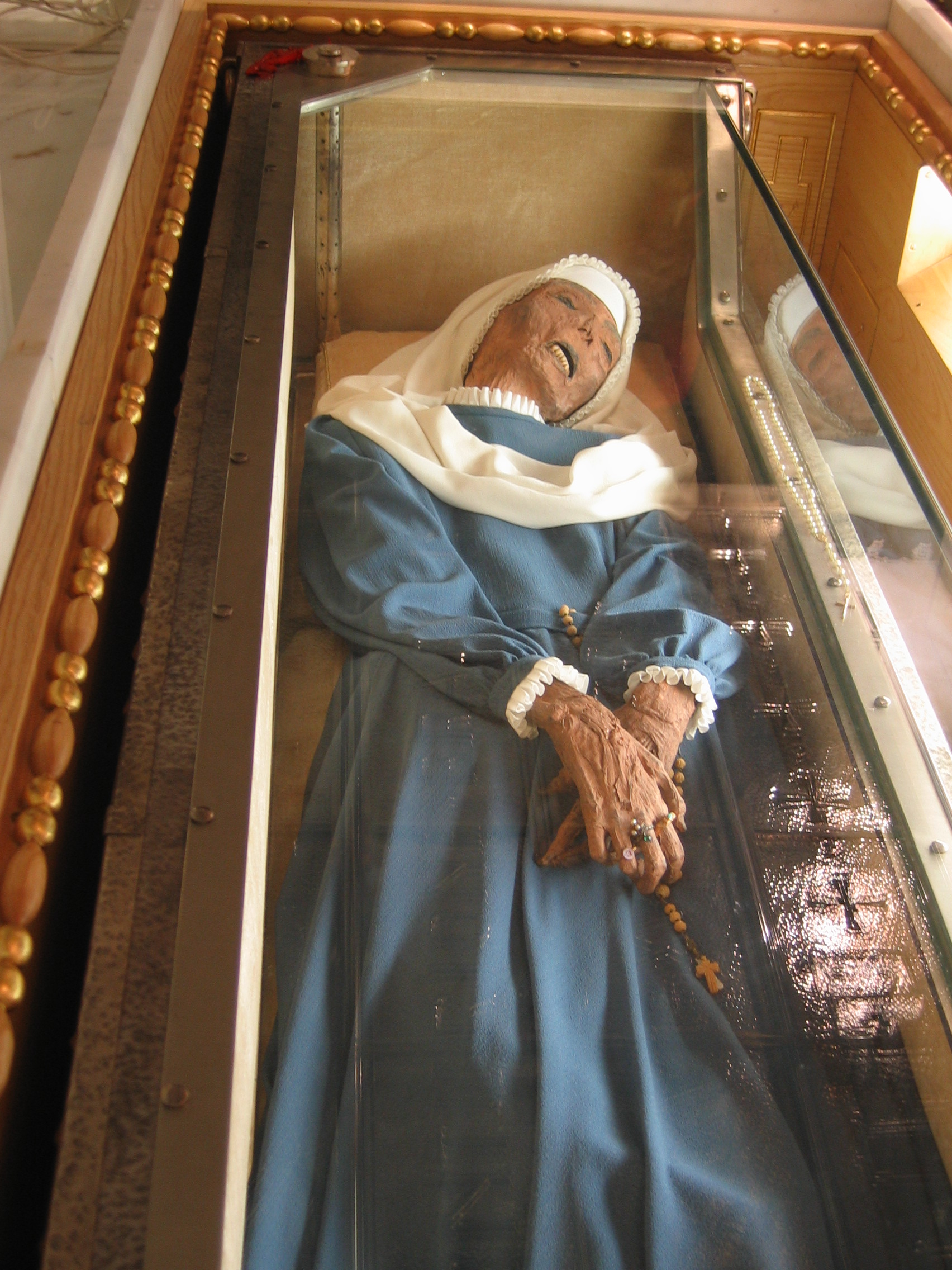
The body of Saint Virginia Centurione, found to be incorrupt by the Catholic Church (April 2, 1587 – December 15, 1651)

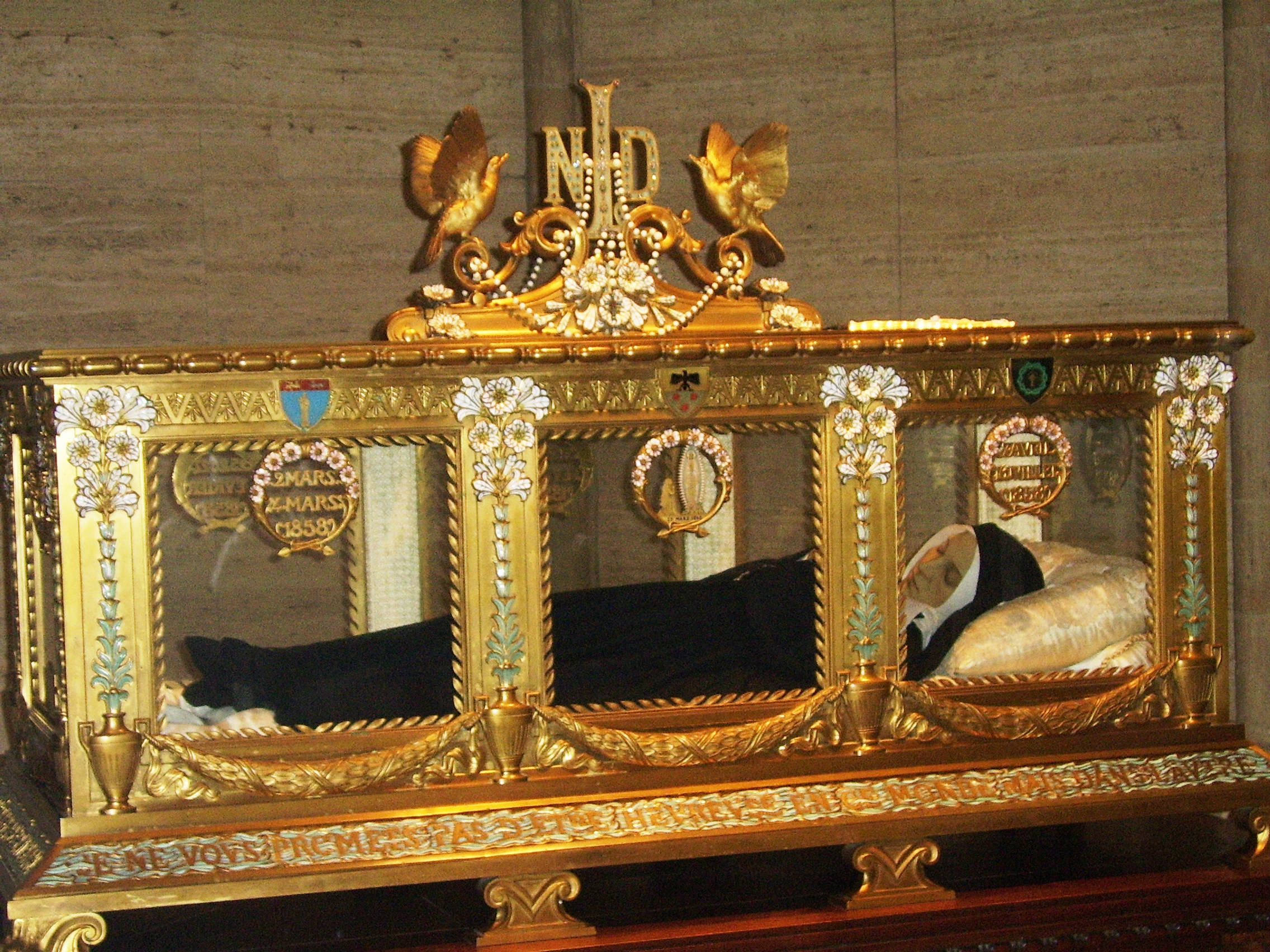
The body of Saint Bernadette of Lourdes with wax face and hand coverings, declared to appear incorrupt by a committee in 1909 (subsequent exhumations indicated corruption). (January 7, 1844 – April 16, 1879)

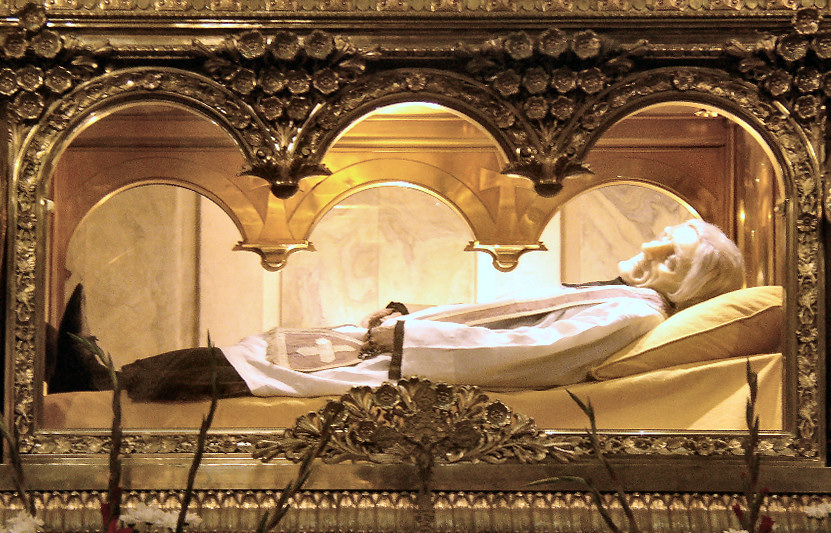
The body of Saint John Mary Vianney wearing a wax mask, found to be incorrupt by the Catholic Church (May 8, 1786 – August 4, 1859)

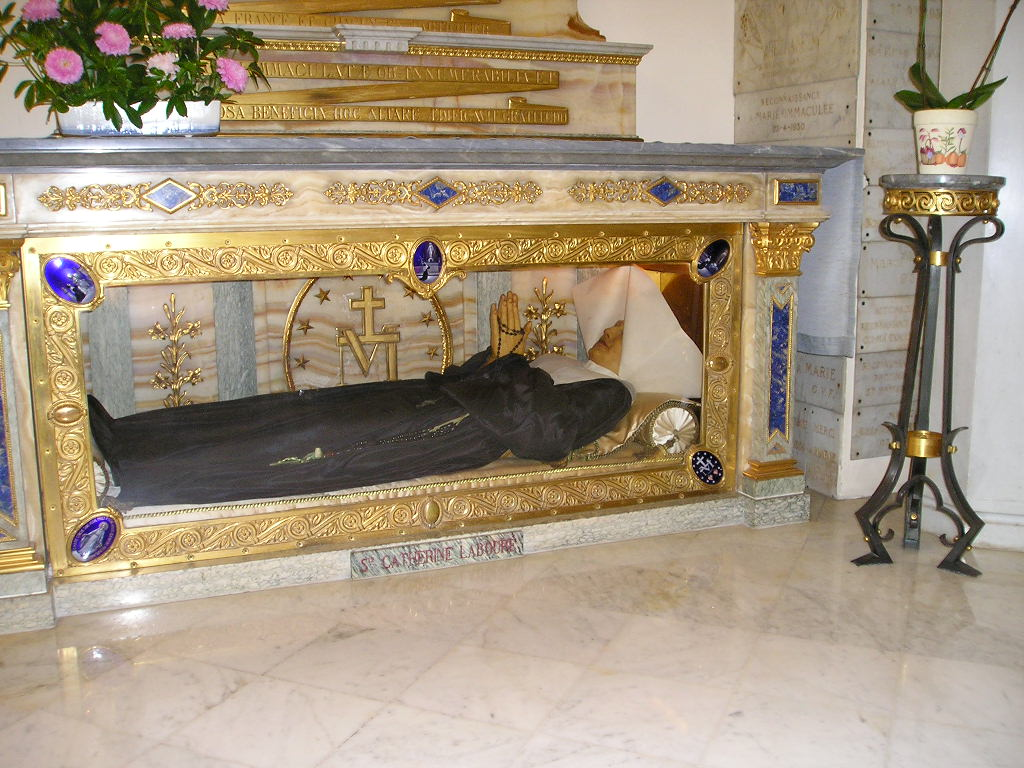
The body of Saint Catherine Labouré, found to be incorrupt by the Catholic Church (May 2, 1806 – December 31, 1876)

=== Blesseds ===
- Saint Margaret of Castello
- Alfredo Ildefonso Schuster
- Charles I of Austria
- Maria Angela Astorch
- Sebastian de Aparicio
- Imelda Lambertini

== Eastern Orthodoxy ==
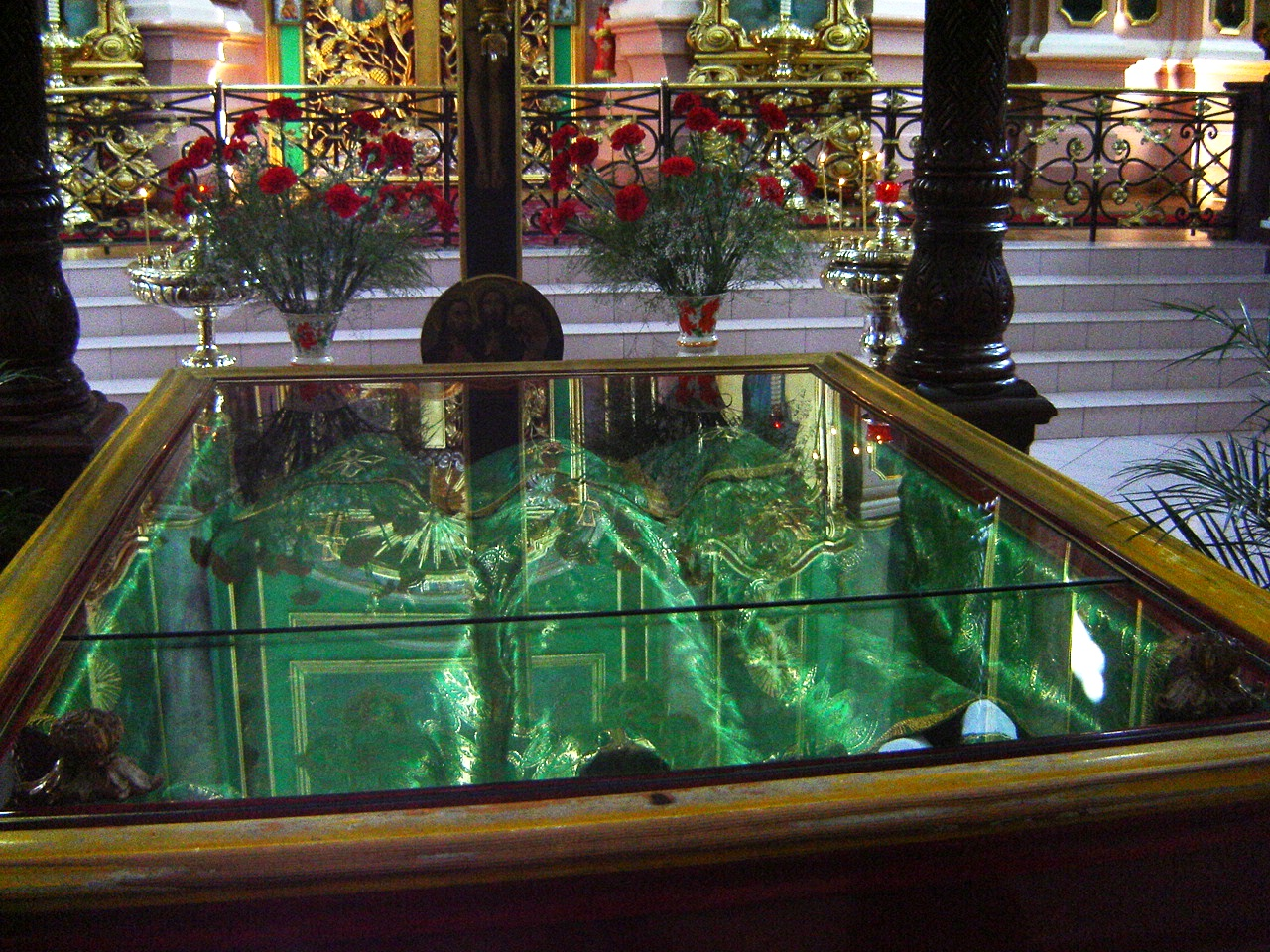
Relics of Anthony, John, and Eustathios at the Orthodox Church of the Holy Spirit in Vilnius, Lithuania

To the Eastern Orthodox, a distinction is made between natural mummification and what is believed to be supernatural incorruptibility. While incorruptibility is not generally deemed to be a prerequisite for sainthood, there are reportedly many Eastern Orthodox saints whose bodies have been found to be incorrupt and are widely venerated. These include:

- Saint Alexander of Svir – the incorrupt relics of the saint were removed from the Svir Monastery by the Bolsheviks on December 20, 1918, after several unsuccessful attempts to confiscate them. Finally, the holy relics were sent to Petrograd's Military Medical Academy. There they remained for nearly eighty years. A second uncovering of St Alexander's relics took place in December 1997, before their return to the Svir Monastery.
- Saint Alexander Nevsky
- Saints Anthony, John, and Eustathios
- Saint Dionysios of Zakynthos
- Saint Elizabeth
- Saint Gerasimus of Kefalonia
- Saint Ioasaph of Belgorod – In 1918 the Bolsheviks removed Saint Ioasaph's relics from his shrine in the cathedral of the Holy Trinity at Belgorod, and for some seventy years, their whereabouts remained unknown. In 1927, the cathedral itself was demolished. In the late 1980s, the relics were discovered in Leningrad's Museum of Religion and Atheism, and on 16 September 1991, they were solemnly returned to the new Cathedral of the Transfiguration of Our Lord in Belgorod, in the presence of Patriarch Alexy II.
- Saint Job of Pochayiv
- Saint John Maximovitch of Shanghai and San Francisco
- Saint John the Russian
- Saint Nectarios of Aegina
- Saint Parascheva of the Balkans
- Saint Spyridon, island of Kerkyra (Corfu)
- Saint Theodora the Empress, island of Kerkyra (Corfu)
- Elder Vissarion (d. 1991), Holy monastery of Agathon, Greece
- Blessed nun Eirini Myrtidiotissa, island of Oenoussai, Greece
- Saint Zosima
- Archbishop Dimitri Royster

== Oriental Orthodoxy ==
- Sidhom Bishay
- Pope Cyril VI of Alexandria

== Judaism ==
Rabbi Louis Ginzberg in his monumental "Legends of the Jews" (Vol. 4, Chapter 10) based on the Jewish Apocrypha and Aggadah mentions an alleged case of bodily incorruptibility of the Biblical Baruch, scribe of Jeremiah (whose tomb is found in Iraq). Similar stories are told of later Hasidic saints, such as Rebbe Elimelech of Lizhensk, Rebbe Sholom Dovber Schneersohn and others.

== See also ==
- Bog body
- Buddhist mummies
- Gisant
- Gebelein predynastic mummies
- Meivazhi
- Paramahansa Yogananda
- Shahid
- Sokushinbutsu
- Sufism

== Literature ==
- Cruz, Joan Carroll (1977 and 1991). The Incorruptibles: A Study of the Incorruption of the Bodies of Various Catholic Saints and Beati, by, OCDS, TAN Books. ISBN 0-89555-066-0.
- Jeremiah, Ken (2012). Christian Mummification: An Interpretive History of the Preservation of Saints, Martyrs and Others, OCDS, McFarland & Co., Inc. ISBN 0786465190.
