= Maunula mummy =

Finnish man whose body was mummified after 6 years dead

The Maunula mummy or Mummy of Maunula was a Finnish man whose mummified body was found in an apartment in Maunula, Helsinki in April 2000. He had been lying dead on his bed for six years. Reasons for his mummification include dry air and good air conditioning.

== Public reaction ==
Police officer Kari Tolvanen described the matter as "a kind of sad record" on TV news.

The matter caused much discussion about could lonely people be somehow helped or otherwise act to prevent such events. The social bureau was blamed for only having paid his rent and not checking his living conditions or whether he was even alive. On the other hand, some people said that officials shouldn't interfere with people's private lives unless necessary. There are very many cases in apartment buildings in big cities where people sometimes interact very little with their neighbours living in the same building.

A similar discussion happened in autumn 2006, when the Yleisradio reporter Ilpo Hakasalo was found in his apartment half a year after his death.

== Life ==
The Maunula mummy was a man born in Helsinki 1938, living alone. The Helsingin Sanomat monthly supplement in November 2000 told his life story. The background for the story had been assembled mostly from official registries and by interviewing his former spouse and former girlfriends.

The man was an only child. His hobbies included scouting and he was very interested in cars and motorcycles. His life took a turn for the worse already in his school days, as he didn't do very well in school. He did well in subjects requiring physical hand skills, such as woodwork, but he did badly in languages and mathematics. He dropped out of school because he had been forced to repeat the same class for several years.

He was described as a restless person who couldn't stay still for long. His jobs were short, and he often moved house. He had been working in harbours, at the sea, in road construction and driving a forklift. He was very sad when his mother died in the middle 1950s. He was not in good terms with his father. After being released from the army, he was married for a short time, during which he had two children.

The man was convicted for several thefts, for which he was sentenced to harsh prison terms. He spent almost the entire 1960s in prison. He once managed to escape from prison and remain escaped for years. After being released from prison, he lived with his girlfriends or was homeless. In the late 1980s, he received a rental apartment in Maunula and lived there alone. At the same time, he had retired due to inability to work because of a myocardial infarction. He had poor skills with money and just spent everything, and so his pension was given to the social bureau to handle for him, and the bureau paid his rent and other necessary costs. Because he had broken contact with his children and other family members years ago and his money was handled by the social bureau, no one had any contact with him for years.

== Death ==
The building maintenance staff found the man's mummified body when they had gone to install a smoke detector in his apartment. After the staff rang the doorbell but the man didn't answer, they used a master key to get in. Police investigation confirmed the day of his death as 15 February 1994 mostly by the mail that had been assembled on the floor. He had been 55 years old at the time of his death.

The man was finally buried at the Honkanummi cemetery, where his ashes were buried in the ground six years after his death. A brass plaque in his memory was attached to a memorial stone along tens of other similar plaques.
