= Immured anchorite =

Tibetan monk

An immured anchorite is a Tibetan monk who has taken a vow to spend time, with some references stating seven days, sealed inside a small walled cell. The cell has a single opening and the monk spends his time mostly in darkness. When the monk is ready to leave he must crawl out through the square hole in the side of the cell.

There have been Christian references to anchorites who have immured themselves seeking a life of prayer and meditation. Usually there would be two holes in their cell, one attached to the church in order to hear and observe Mass and the other on the opposite side for visitors.

== See also ==
- Anchorite
- Immurement
- Sokushinbutsu
- Stylite
