= Wat Khunaram =

Buddhist temple in Surat Thani province, Thailand

Coordinates: 9.4500°N 100.0005°E

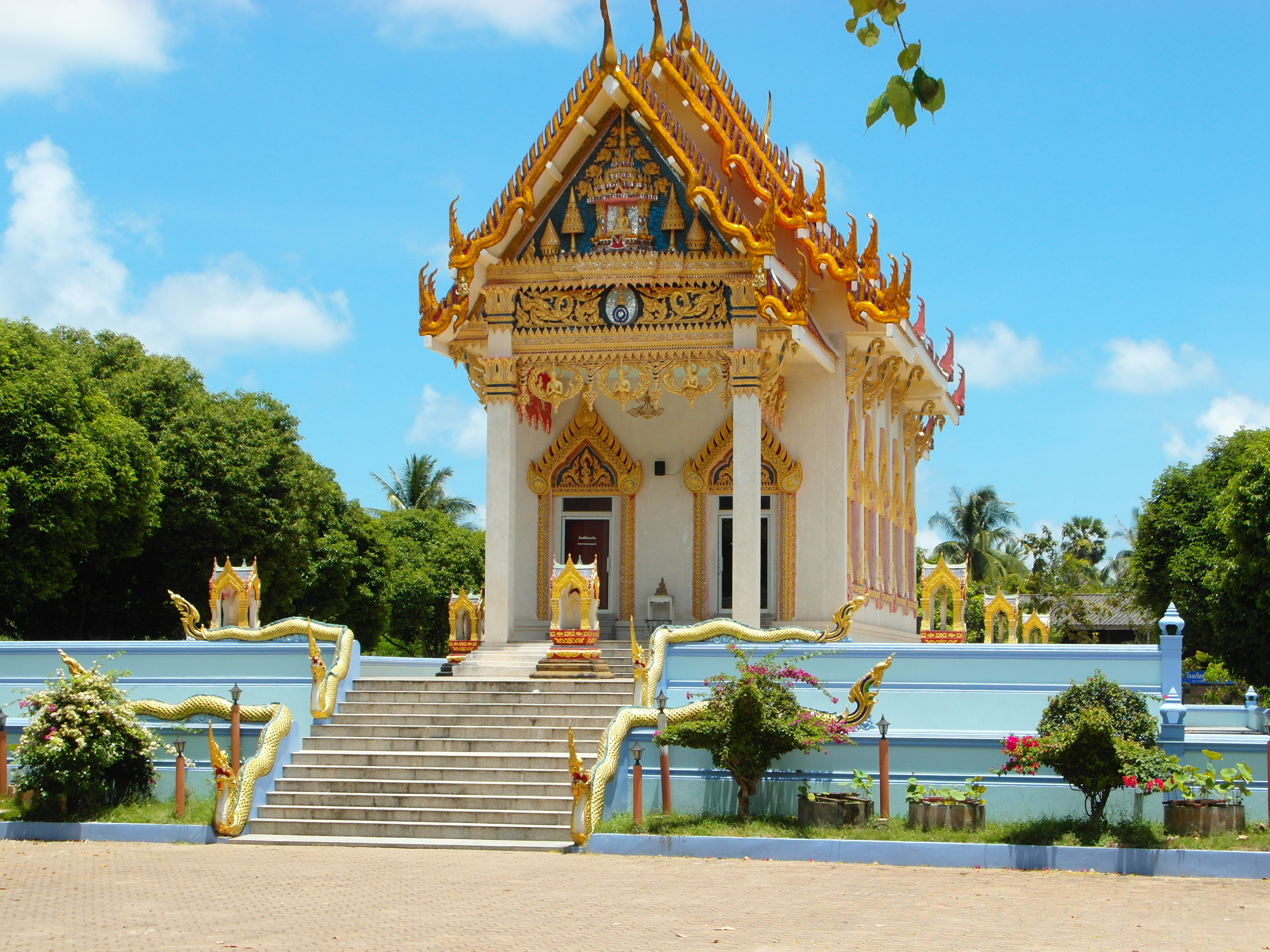
Samui 2013 May - panoramio

Wat Khunaram (Thai: วัดคุณาราม) is a Buddhist temple on the island of Ko Samui in Surat Thani Province, Thailand. It is most notable for being the shrine of "the Mummy Monk", Luang Pho Daeng, who died in 1973 and directed that his body be put on display as a reminder of the transience of human existence. It is located in the area between Na Muang and Hua Thanon on Thai route 4169, the main route around the island. It is 13 km southeast of Nathon, the island's "capital city" and main port, and 6 km west of the resort town of Lamai Beach.

== See also ==
- List of Buddhist temples in Thailand
