= Polleke (cat) =

15th-century Dutch mummified cat

- Species: Felis catus
- Sex: unknown
- Died: ca. 1440–1460; Breda, Duchy of Brabant
- Known for: Mummified cat found in the Grote Kerk Breda
- Named after: John II, Lord of Polanen and reflects the Flemish heritage of the church's original builders

Polleke (died c. 1440-1460) is the name of a 15th-century mummified cat that was discovered in 1906 inside the walls of the Grote Kerk ('Great Church') in Breda, Netherlands. The cat is believed to have been deliberately sealed into the church’s structure as a foundation sacrifice—a ritual believed to protect buildings from evil spirits. In 2025, the cat was officially named Polleke and returned to public display in the church.

== Discovery ==
In 1906, during restoration work on the Grote Kerk (Great Church) in Breda, Netherlands, stonemasons discovered the mummified remains of a domestic cat between two walls in a tower on the north side of the church.

The cat, later named Polleke, was removed from the wall and taken home by M. A. Nieukerken, the architect responsible for the church's restoration. Nieukerken preserved the remains behind glass in the vestibule of his home. In a note accompanying the cat, he wrote that it "always attracts attention" and that he repeatedly had to recount how it had been discovered. He also recorded that the remains had been requested for display at cat exhibitions.

== Disappearance and return ==
Polleke was exhibited in 1916 at a cat show in the Hague Zoo, where it was displayed as a curiosity. After that, the cat's whereabouts were unknown for many decades.

In 2020, the Grote Kerk received a message from the Huys te Warmond Foundation near Leiden. The cat had been found in an attic and was offered back to the church.

== Scientific analysis ==
In 2024, more than a century after Polleke was discovered in 1906, researchers carried out a programme of scientific analysis using historical photographs, computed tomography (CT) scanning and radiocarbon dating. The remains were compared with a 1906 glass negative photograph taken shortly after the discovery, confirming that they were the same specimen.

Radiocarbon dating conducted by Archeoplan ECO and the Centre for Isotope Research at the University of Groningen dated the cat to approximately 1440–1460 with greater than 95 per cent probability. The results placed Polleke in the same period as the construction of the section of the Grote Kerk where it had been discovered.

CT scans performed at Amsterdam University Medical Center showed that the cat's body was complete and that none of its bones had been fractured. Researchers estimated that it had died between one and seven years of age. Examination of the claws and teeth found no unusual wear, suggesting that the animal had not attempted to scratch or bite its way out of the wall. The analysis was unable to determine the cat's sex, coat colour or cause of death.

== Ritual significance ==
Historians believe the cat was used as a building sacrifice—an old ritual in which animals or objects were embedded in buildings to ward off evil. According to the director of the church, Marieke Wiegel, it is unlikely the cat was entombed alive, as its posture and condition show no signs of struggle. The practice is linked to medieval beliefs in which cats were associated with the devil, and sealing one in a wall symbolised protection against evil.

== Naming contest ==
In 2025, the church organised a naming contest involving school children from Breda. Out of 847 entries, the name Polleke was chosen. The winning submission came from a 12-year-old student, who was inspired by John II, Lord of Polanen, a 14th-century nobleman associated with the founding of the Grote Kerk. The name also reflects the Flemish heritage of the church's original builders and has a gender-neutral quality in Dutch, appropriate given the unknown sex of the cat.

== Current display ==
Since 18 June 2025, Polleke has been on public display in the Grote Kerk Breda. The mummified cat is exhibited in a historic wooden box, inside a climate-controlled glass case to ensure preservation for future generations.

== See also ==
- Animal mummy
- List of individual cats
- List of mummies
