= Animal mummy =

Mummification of animals in ancient Egypt

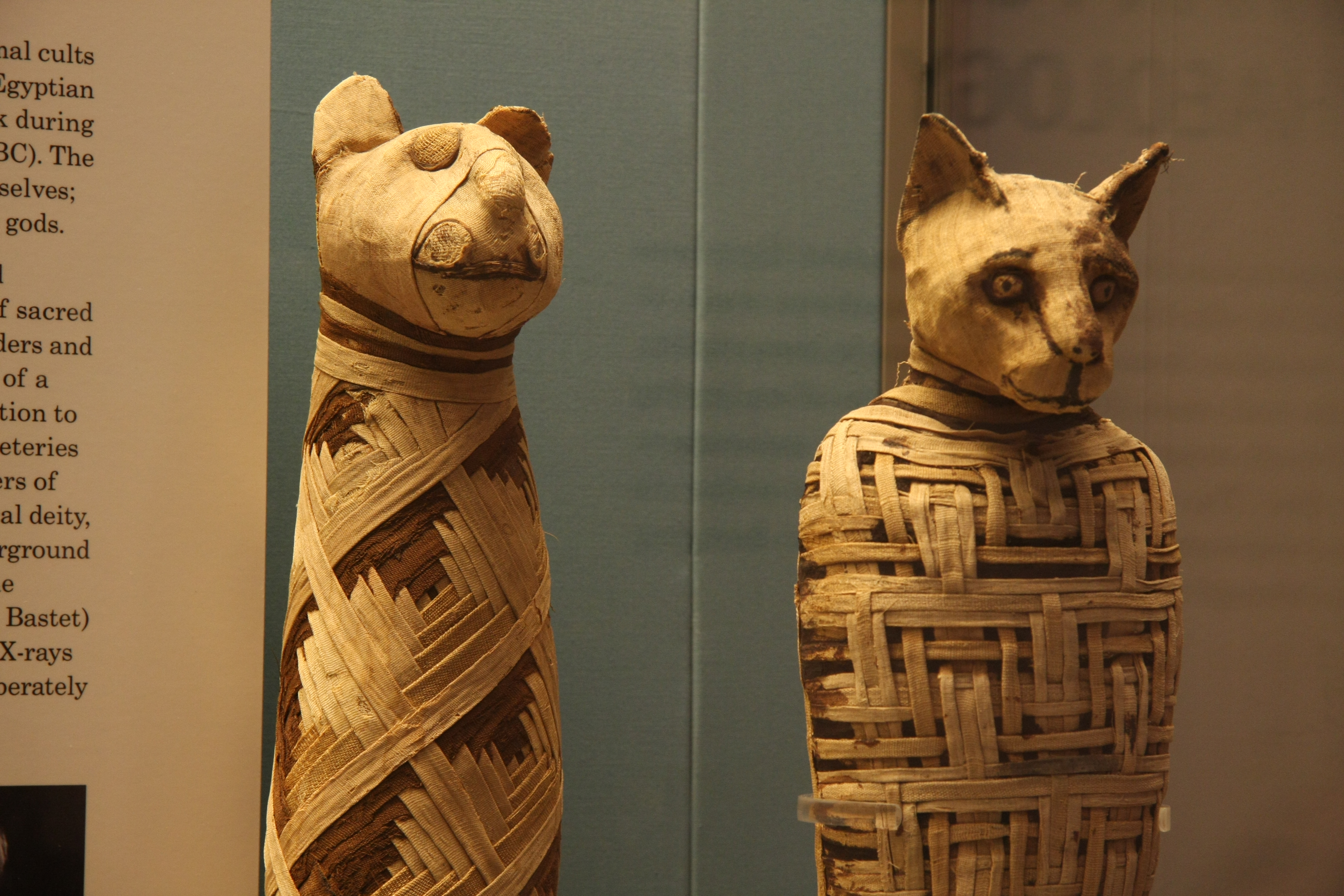
Egyptian mummies of animals in the British Museum

Animal mummification was common in ancient Egypt. Animals were an important part of Egyptian culture, not only in their role as food and pets, but also for religious reasons. Many different types of animals were mummified, typically for four main purposes: to allow people's beloved pets to go on to the afterlife, to provide food in the afterlife, to act as offerings to a particular god, and because some were seen as physical manifestations of specific deities that the Egyptians worshipped. Bastet, the cat goddess, is an example of one such deity. In 1888, an Egyptian farmer digging in the sand near Istabl Antar discovered a mass grave of felines, ancient cats that were mummified and buried in pits at great numbers.

Besides Egypt, pre-Columbian bird mummies have been found in the Atacama Desert of Chile, including some next to the oasis town of Pica. These mummies were part of unknown rituals and a long-range trade from the humid tropics across the Altiplano and the Andes to reach Atacama Desert in modern Chile. If bird distribution was as in present, the closest place to Pica from where all bird species could have been captured is Beni Department in northern Bolivia. The mummified birds found in Atacama Desert had their organs removed as well as their tail feathers. Some bird mummies were found wrapped in textiles.

In Europe a 15th-century mummified cat (named Polleke), was discovered inside the walls of a church in the Netherlands. The cat is believed to have been deliberately sealed into the church's structure as a foundation sacrifice; a ritual believed to protect buildings from evil spirits.

== Egyptian beliefs about animals ==
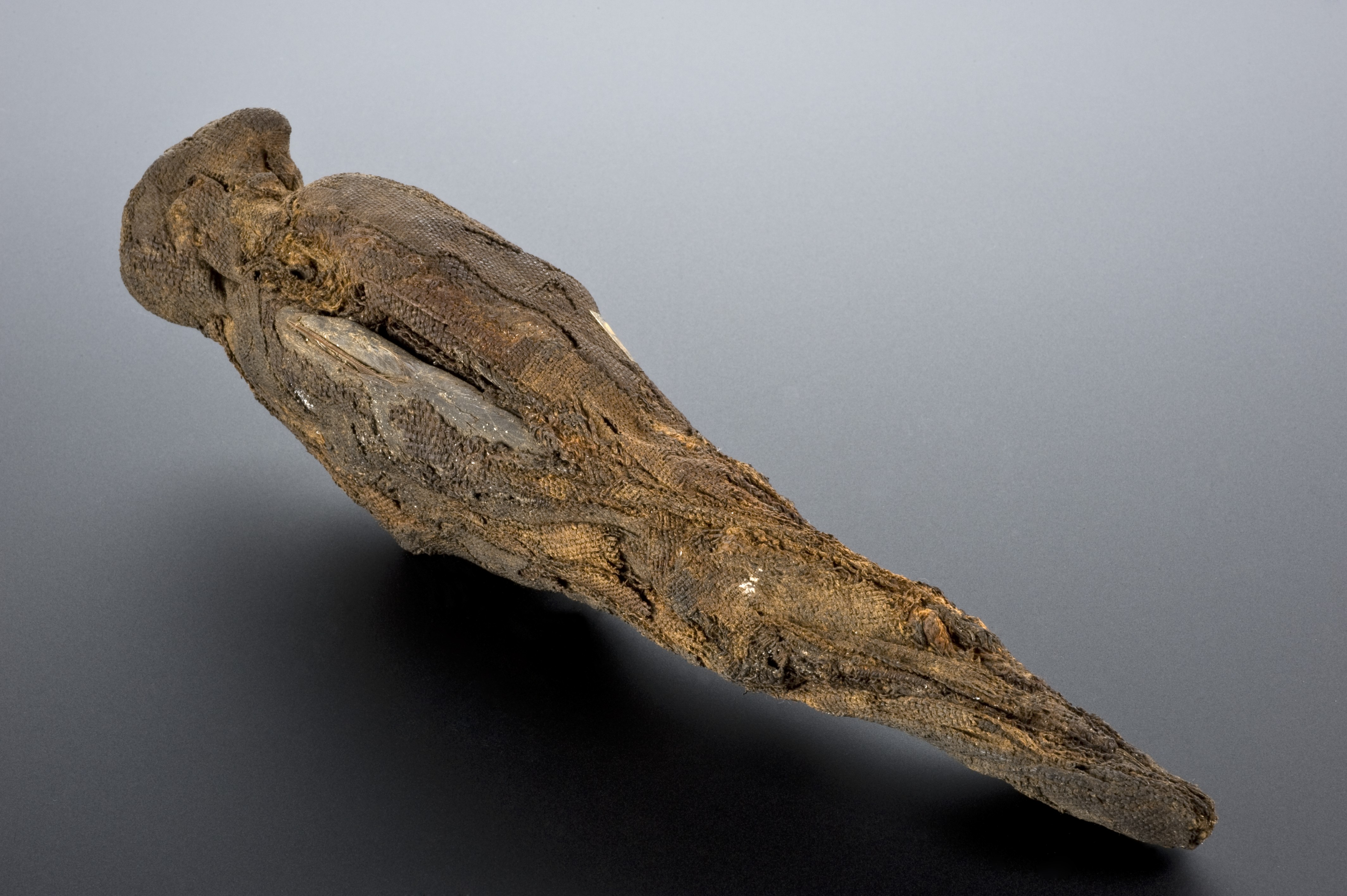
Mummy of a peregrine falcon

Throughout the history of Ancient Egypt, animals were highly respected. According to Egyptologist Herman te Velde, in few other cultures have animals been as influential in so many aspects of life, nor has any culture depicted animals so often in their artwork or writing. It is estimated that one in every four or five Egyptian hieroglyphs relates to animals. Egyptians believed that animals were crucial to both physical and spiritual survival—vital to physical survival because they were a major source of food and to spiritual survival based on how well a person treated animals during their life on earth. Some animals were considered to be literal incarnations of the deities; therefore, it is understandable why Egyptians would have wanted to hold such animals in the highest regard, giving them a proper burial through mummification. In order to determine a person's admittance or denial to the afterlife, the deities would ask a series of judgment questions. One of these crucial questions would be whether they had mistreated any animals during their life on earth. Because of this religious belief, the killing of an animal was considered a serious crime punishable by death. Diodorus Siculus, a Greek historian from the first century BCE, witnessed the lynching of a Roman who had accidentally killed a cat during a visit to Egypt. Understandably, this punishment frightened many Egyptians to the point that if one would happen upon a dead animal, they would flee from it as to avoid the accusation of being its killer.

=== Beloved pets ===
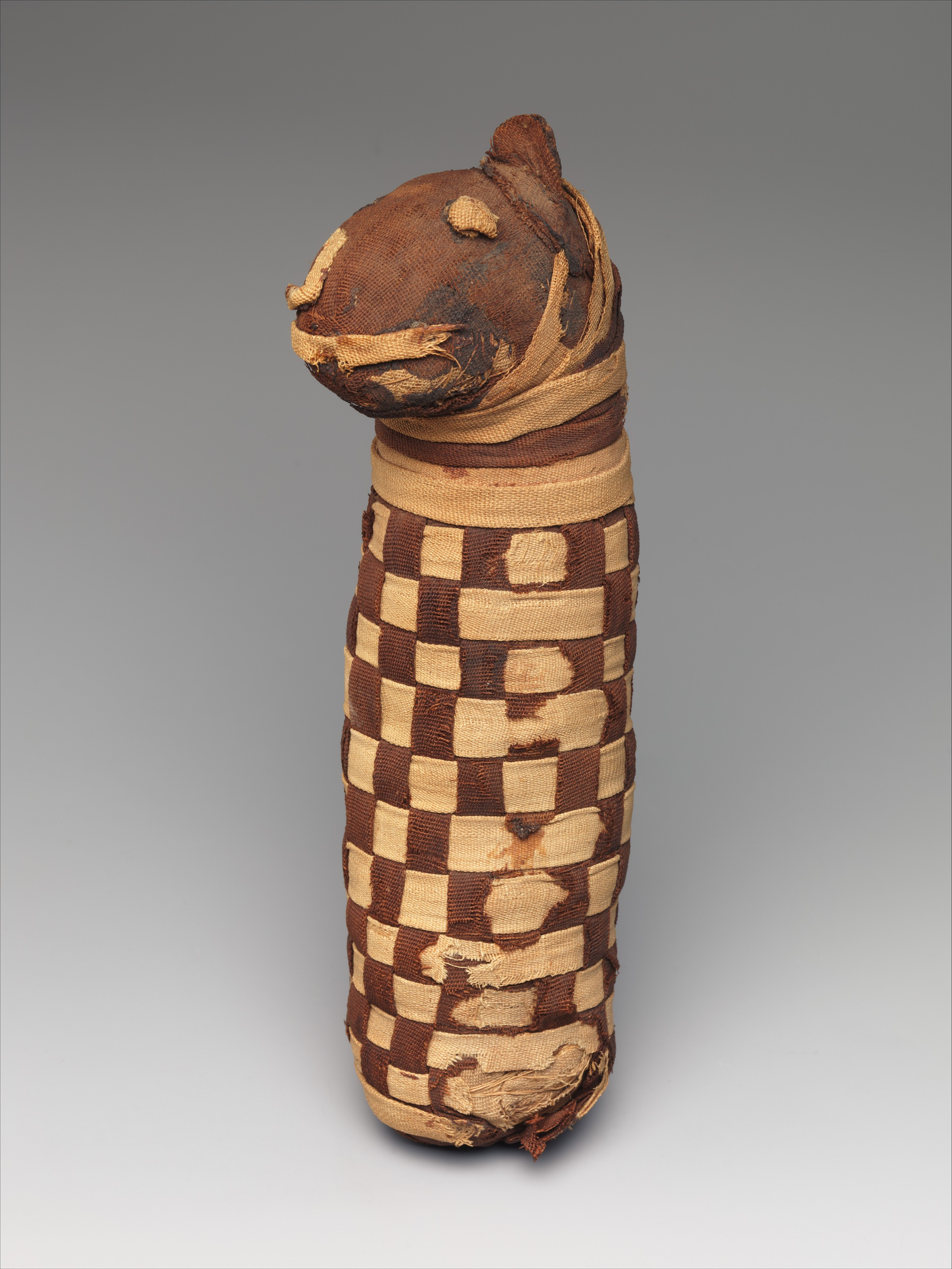
Animal mummy containing dog bones, Metropolitan Museum of Art

Long before animal mummies were used as religious offerings, animals in Egypt were occasionally mummified for a more personal reason—as beloved pets that were to keep the deceased company in the afterlife. The most common Egyptian pets included cats, dogs, mongooses, monkeys, gazelles, and birds. Many Egyptians loved their pets, and the customary process of mourning the loss of a loved pet included crying and shaving one's eyebrows. Ancient Egyptian pets were given names just like they are today, a fact evidenced by more than seventy names deciphered in inscriptions identifying pet dog mummies. Pets were often depicted on the tombs of Egyptians, indicating their masters’ affection toward the animals. Egyptians believed that mummification was imperative in order to gain admittance to the afterlife, and therefore the belief was that the mummification of these pets would ensure the animals’ immortality.

Specific archaeological findings have confirmed that pets were mummified. The most famous example of this is the Theban priestess Maatkare Mutemhat’s African green monkey (Chlorocebus aethiops). When her tomb was discovered, there was a small, mummified bundle present at her feet, which was initially believed to be her child. This puzzled archaeologists because Maatkare Mutemhat was a High Priestess who had taken a serious vow of celibacy. If this had been her child, it would have meant that she had, at some point, broken the oath she had taken as High Priestess, raising a slew of other questions regarding her life. Finally, in 1968, an X-ray of the small mummy revealed it to be an adult African green monkey (Chlorocebus aethiops), not a child. Similarly, Maatkare's half-sister, Esemkhet, was discovered buried with a mummified pet—she had a mummified gazelle in her tomb.

Prince Thutmose of the Eighteenth Dynasty was also buried with a beloved animal—his pet cat was mummified and placed in a stone coffin in his tomb. Another Egyptian, named Hapymen, had his pet dog mummified, wrapped in cloth, and placed at the side of his coffin. At the tomb KV50 in the Valley of the Kings, a mummified dog and baboon were discovered buried together, although the owner is unknown.

=== Food for the afterlife ===
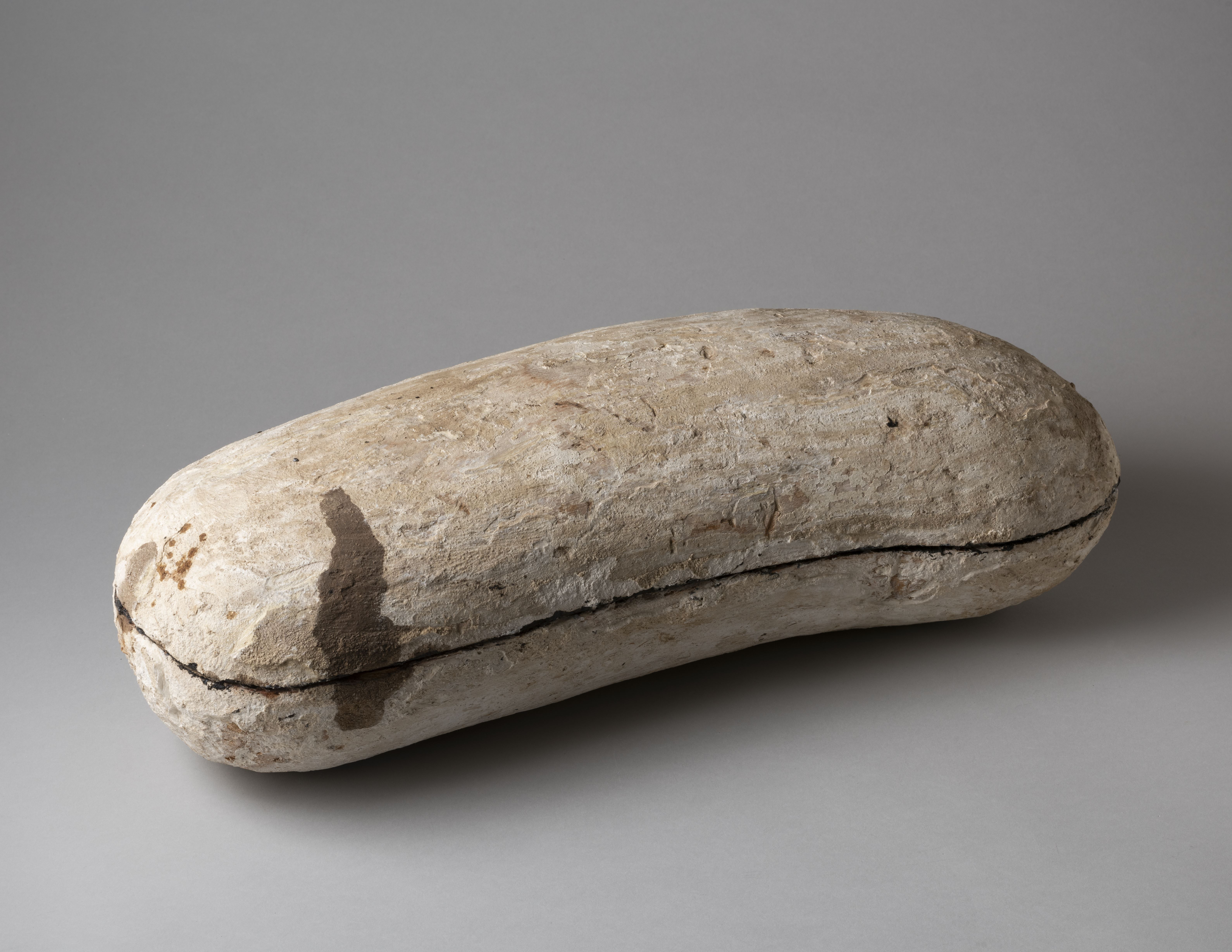
Container for mummified meat (beef thighs and ribs), wood, from tomb QV46 in the Valley of the Queens. Between 1493 and 1482 BC (New Kingdom). Museo Egizio, Turin (S 5087). It is meant to contain mummified food used to preserve food intended for the deceased's sustenance. The container is rounded and shaped like a duck.

Egyptians believed that the afterlife would be a continuation of this one, allowing for the transportation of items from this life to the next. In order to bring food to the afterlife, Egyptians would surround human mummies by what are known as victual mummies, made of edible animals. These animals were prepared by dehydrating the meat and wrapping it in linen bandages, which indicated that the animals were food, not pets. The victual animals were not mummified to the same meticulous extent that a pet or human would be, but they were nonetheless carefully preserved using natron and other special salts. This food was included in tombs in order to sustain the deceased person's soul, called the ka, during the journey to the next world. A variety of food has been found in many tombs, mostly breads, meats, and fowl. King Tutankhamun's tomb held several coffin-shaped wooden boxes containing victual mummies, in his case duck and other types of meats.

Container for a mummified duck, from tomb QV46. 1493 - 1482 BC (New Kingdom). Museo Egizio, Turin (S.5083)

=== Religious purposes ===
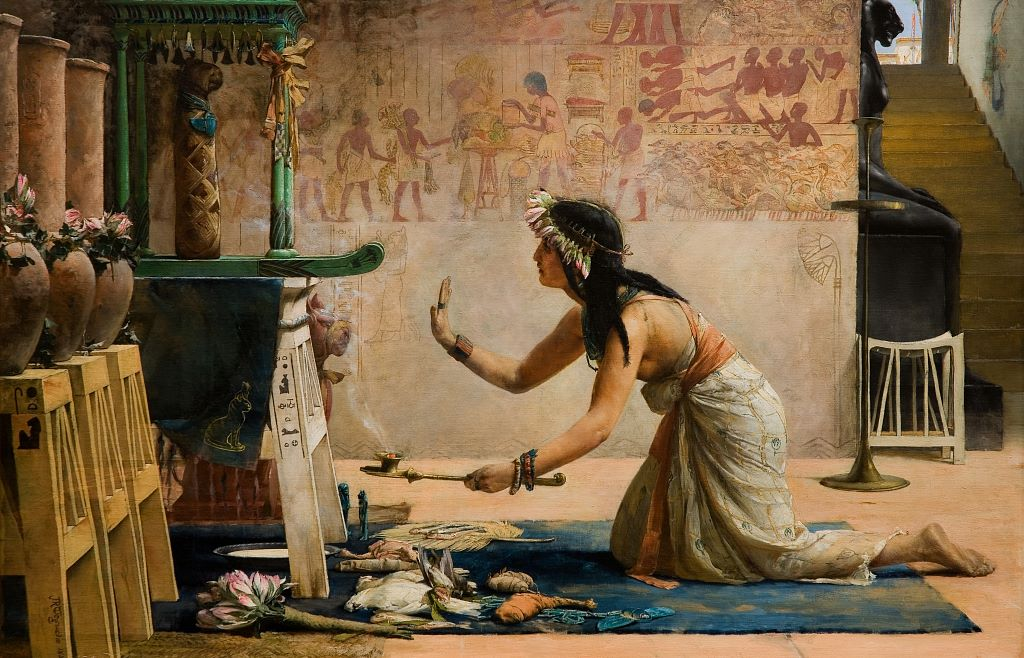
The Obsequies of an Egyptian Cat, by John Reinhard Weguelin (1886).

Ancient Egyptian religion was characterized by polytheism, the belief in multiple deities. Prior to the unification of Upper and Lower Egypt, there were a tremendous number of these deities, each representative of a different element of the natural world. After the great unification, a more limited list of deities developed. These were usually depicted as having a human body and an animal head, further emphasizing the importance of animals in Egyptian religion. Over time, religious cults emerged for the worship of each specific deity. Two main types of worship distinguished the cults: the first choosing to worship the god through mass mummified animal offerings; the second selecting a totem animal to represent the god during its life, which was then mummified at the time of its death (e.g., the Apis bull).

==== Votive offerings ====
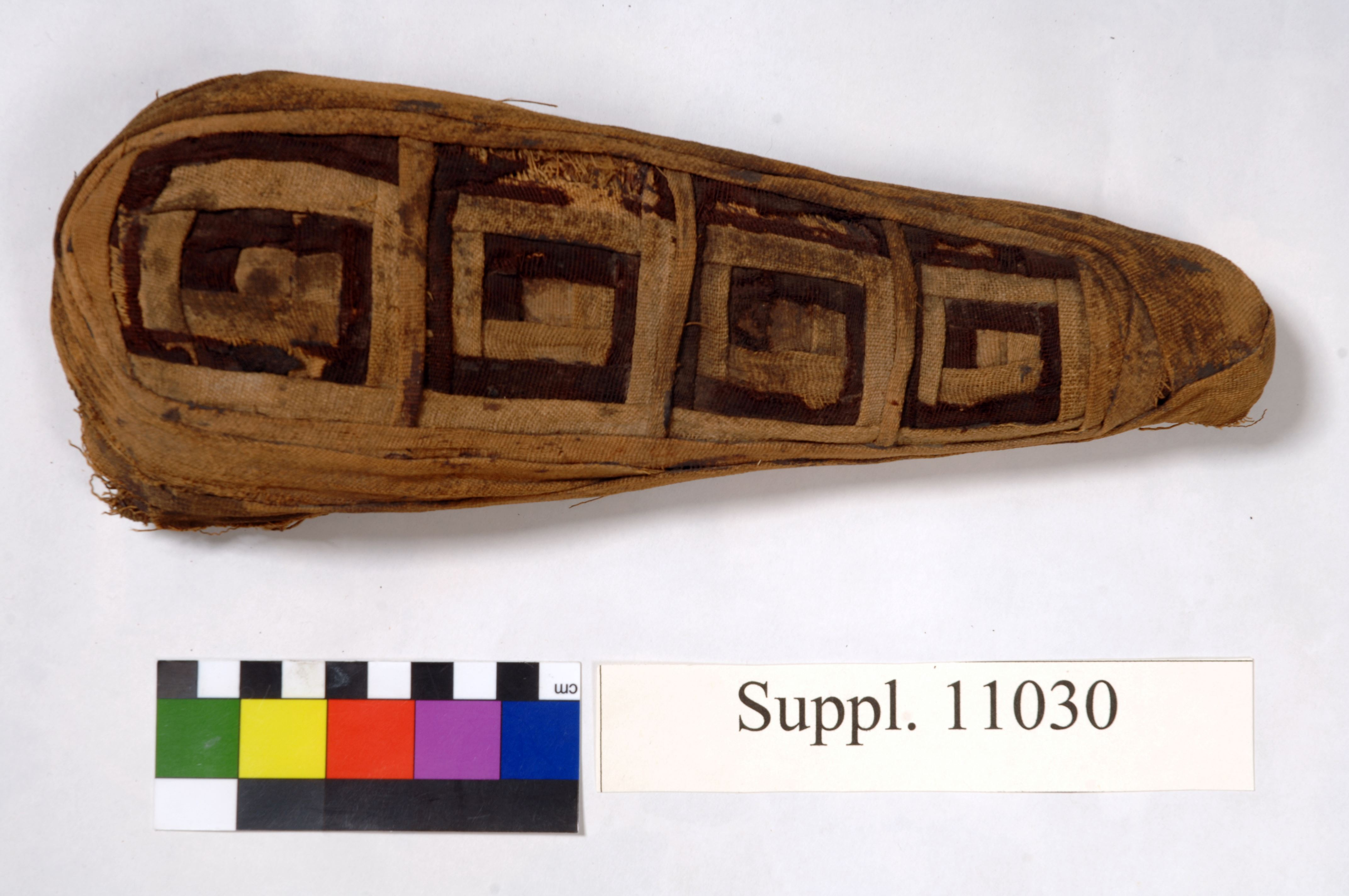
Hawk mummy. Between 299 and 300 BC, Ptolemaic Kingdom/Roman Egypt. Museo Egizio , Turin (S. 11030).

The vast majority of Egyptian animal mummies were religious offerings. If an Egyptian sought a favor from a deity, an offering would be made or purchased, then placed at the appropriate temple. Before animal mummification became common, these offerings were usually bronze statues depicting the animals. However, eventually animal mummies—a cheaper alternative to bronze statues—became the most popular form of offering. As such, millions of these mummified animals have been discovered throughout Egypt. Inspection of those mummies, usually done through CT scans which allow researchers to examine the skeletons of the mummies without damaging the outer wrappings, has suggested that these types of animals were bred for the sole purpose of offerings. As the process of animal mummification for the purpose of offerings grew, mummification techniques became progressively less meticulous. Studies have revealed many of the large-scale animal offerings to be "fakes" (the wrappings containing only a few bones, feathers, reeds, wood, or pieces of pottery). The animals were raised on temple grounds and then sold to pilgrims or regular citizens. The necks of the animals were often broken, an indication that their sole purpose in life was to be sacrificed as offerings. When visiting the temples, Egyptians of the general public would purchase these pre-mummified animals and offer them to the gods.

The Egyptian scribe known as Hor son of Harendjiotef, writing in the second century BCE, suggests the purpose underlying the practice of mummifying animals: "The benefit [of mummification] which is performed for the Ibis, the soul of Toth, the greatest one, is made for the Hawk also, the soul of Ptah, the soul of Apis, the soul of Pre, the soul of Shu, the soul of Tefnut, the soul of Geb, the soul of Osiris, the soul of Isis, the soul of Nephtys, the great gods of Egypt, the Ibis and the Hawk." The scribe indicates that each mummy harbors the essence of the deity with which it is associated: That is to say, some animals were, or contained, a ba, a part of the soul that is an active agent in this world and the spiritual world. Therefore, ancient Egyptians believed, the votive animal mummies enabled the animals' souls to act as messengers between people on earth and the gods.

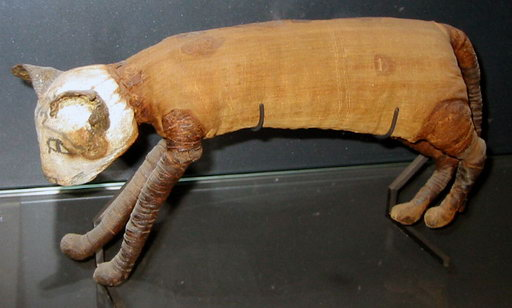
A mummified cat

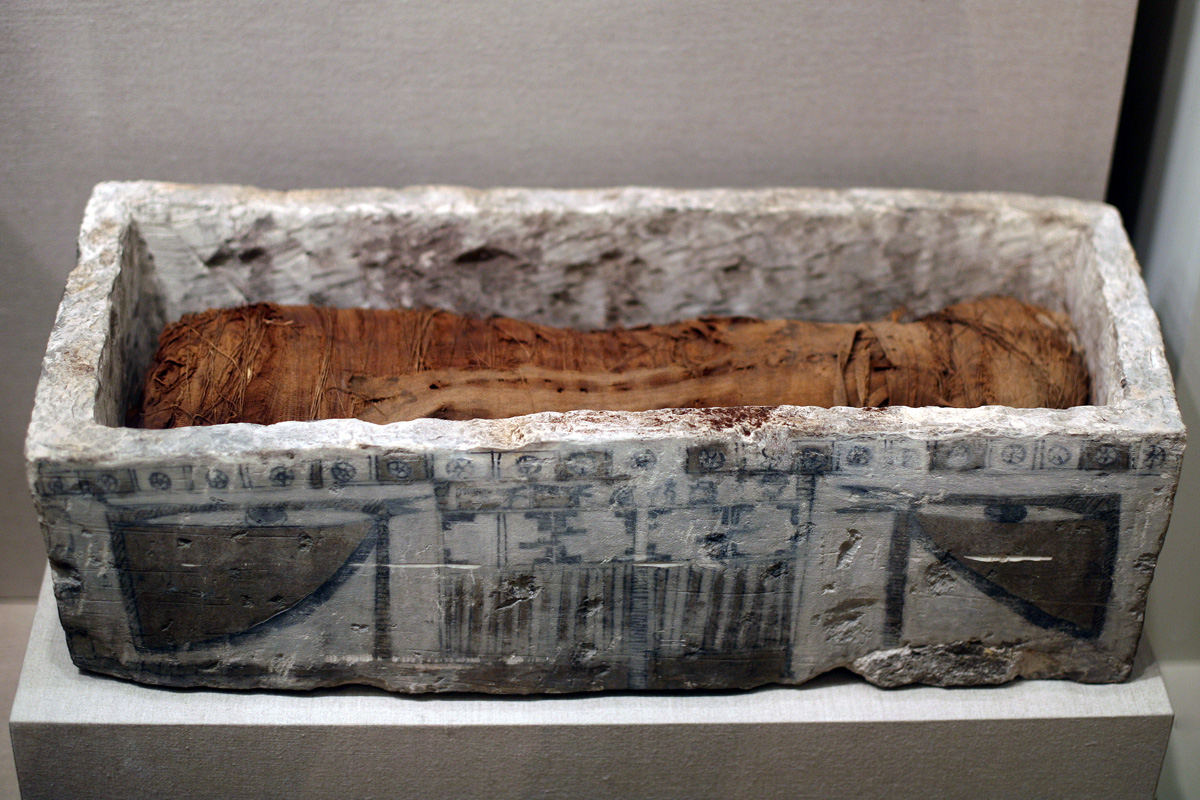
Sarcophagus for cat mummy, ca 305 BCE, Brooklyn Museum

===== Cats =====
Cats were mummified as religious offerings in enormous quantities and were believed to represent the war goddess Bastet. This cult was primarily centered at Thebes and Beni Hasan beginning in the Ptolemaic Period. In addition, thousands of cat mummies have been found at the catacombs of Saqqara. Cats who were bred to become offerings of this type usually died due to strangulation or the breaking of their necks. During mummification, the cat bodies would be dried and filled with soil, sand or some other kind of packing material. They were either positioned with their limbs folded closely to their bodies or in a sitting, lifelike position. The wrapping was usually completed through intricate, geometric patterns.

Early in the development of animal mummification, cat mummies were placed in little bronze or wooden sarcophagi. More expensive mummies were typically adorned with features drawn in black paint and colored glass, obsidian or rock crystal eyes. Kittens and fetuses were mummified and buried inside the stomach of a statue that represented their mother. As time went by, like all mummies designed for this purpose, the mummification became less precise. In fact, Sir T. C. S. Morrison-Scott, former Director of the British Museum of Natural History, unwrapped a large number of cat mummies, but discovered many were simply stuffed with random body parts of cats and not mummified with detailed care.

Mummified cats have also been found outside Egypt. In 1906 a 15th-century mummified cat, in 2025 named Polleke, was discovered in the inside the walls of the Grote Kerk in Breda, the Netherlands. The cat is believed to have been deliberately sealed into the church's structure as a foundation sacrifice; a ritual believed to protect buildings from evil spirits.

Cat mummy of the Egyptian Late Period – Ptolemaic Period, 400–200 BCE. Museo Egizio, Turin (C.2348/01)

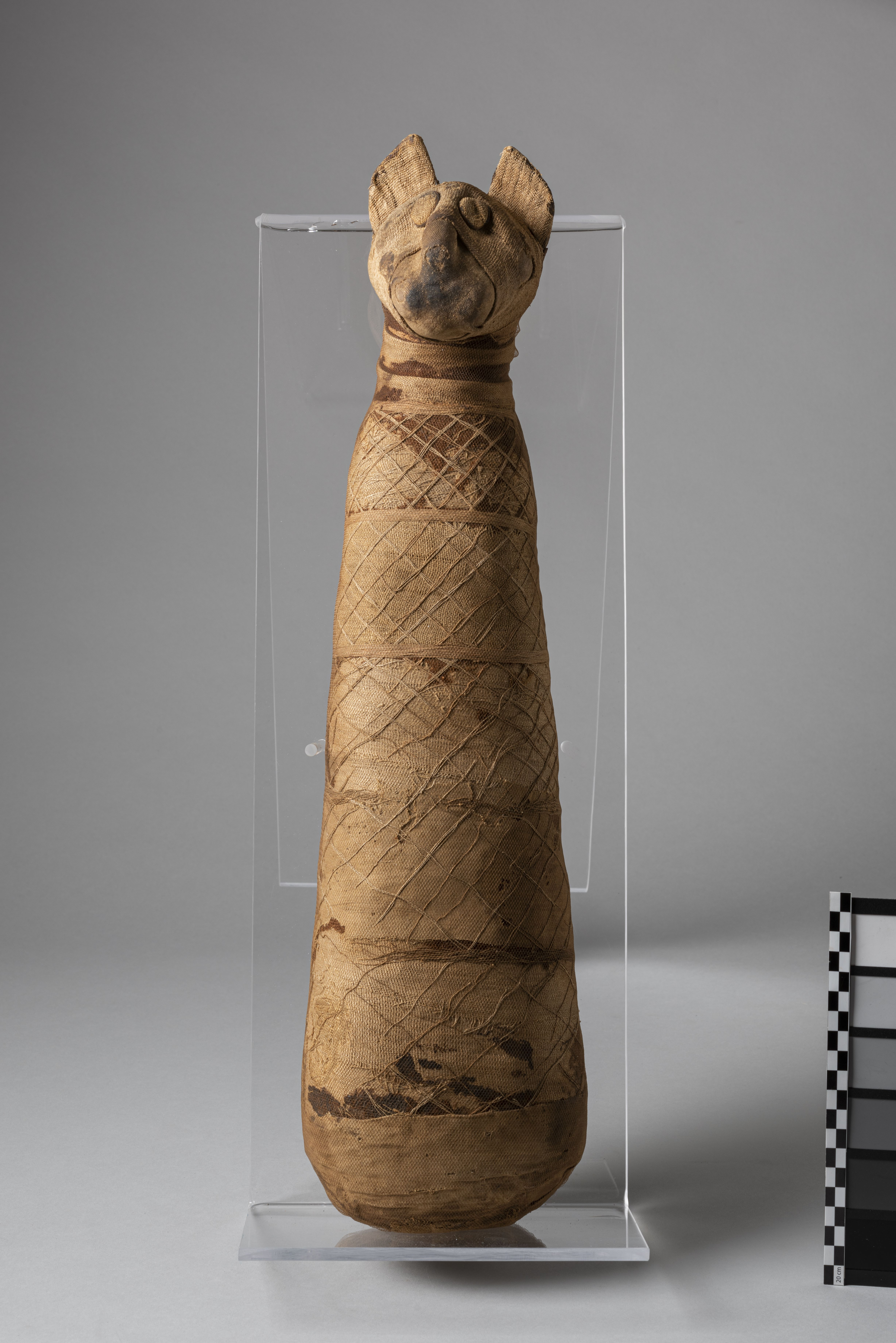
Skittle-type cat mummy with a naturalistic, modeled head.

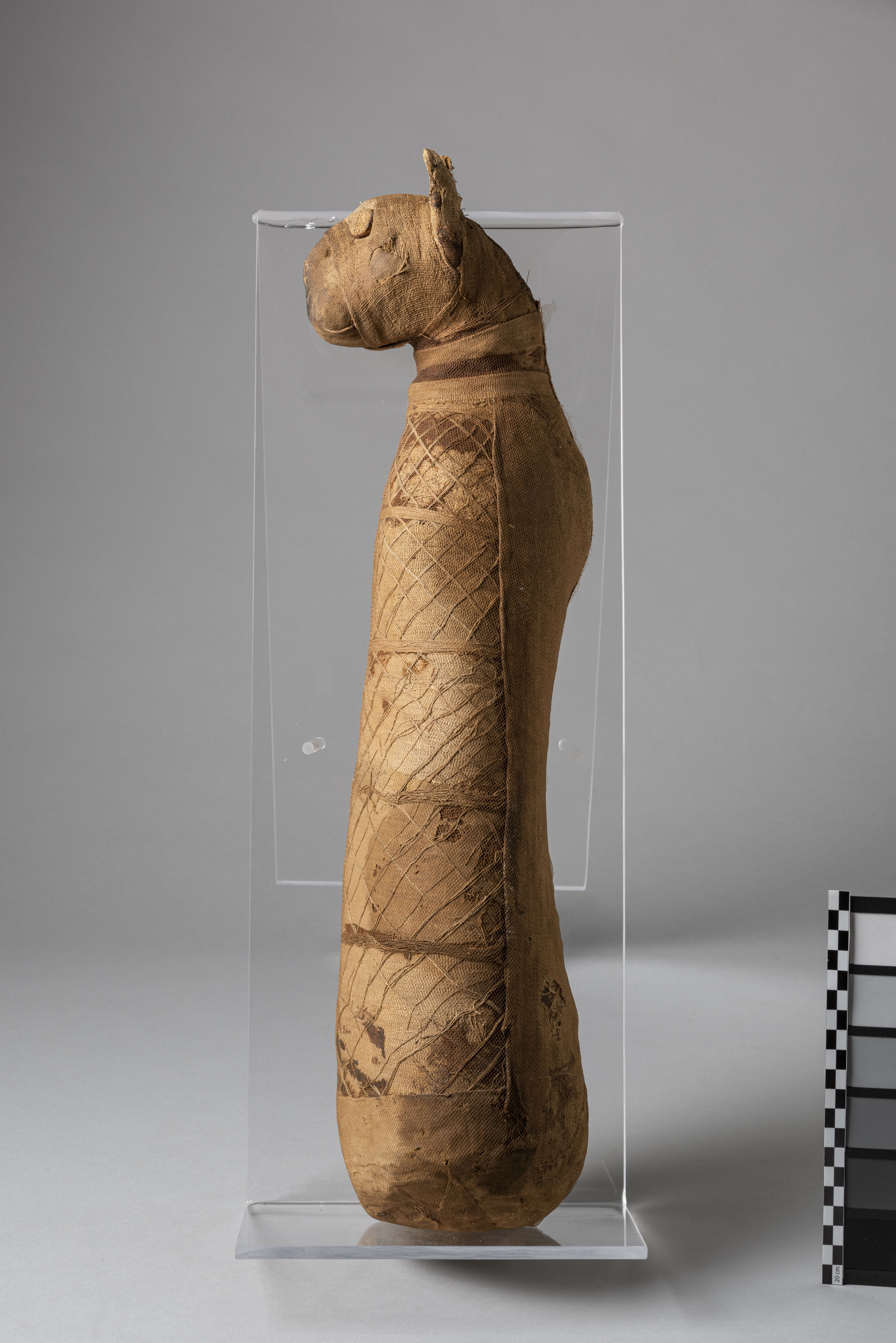
Profile view

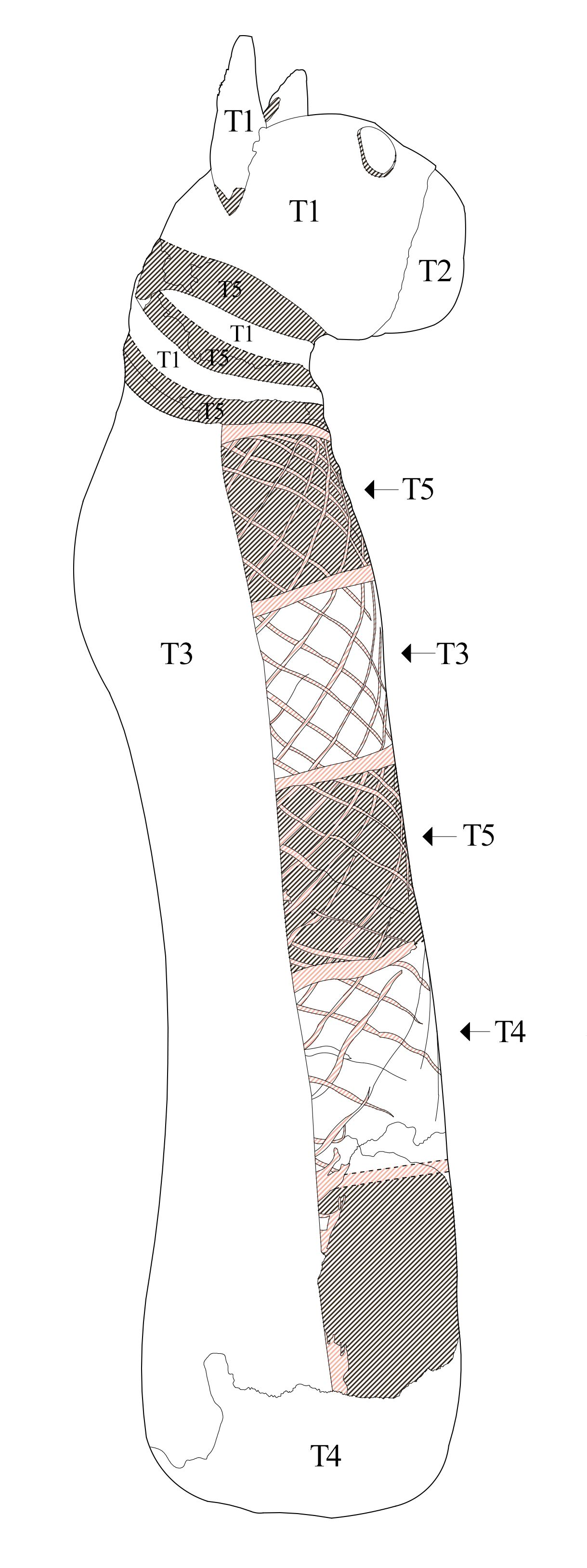
The body is wrapped in five different types of fabric. The front of the body is covered with a pattern of linen cords woven with linen threads, creating a net.

Radiography. The cat died as an adult at approximately twenty-two months of age.

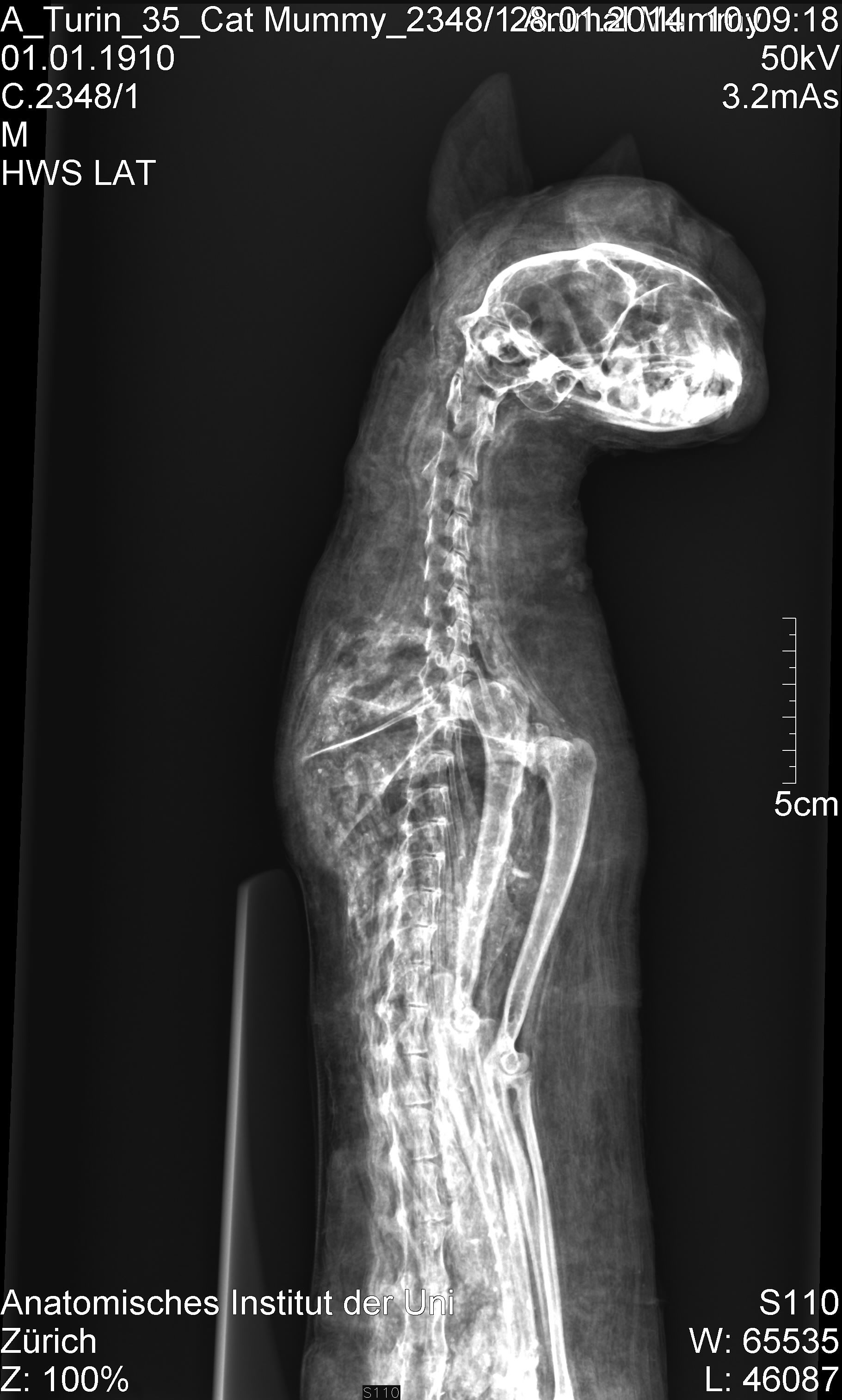
Radiography (detail of the upper part)

===== Ibises =====
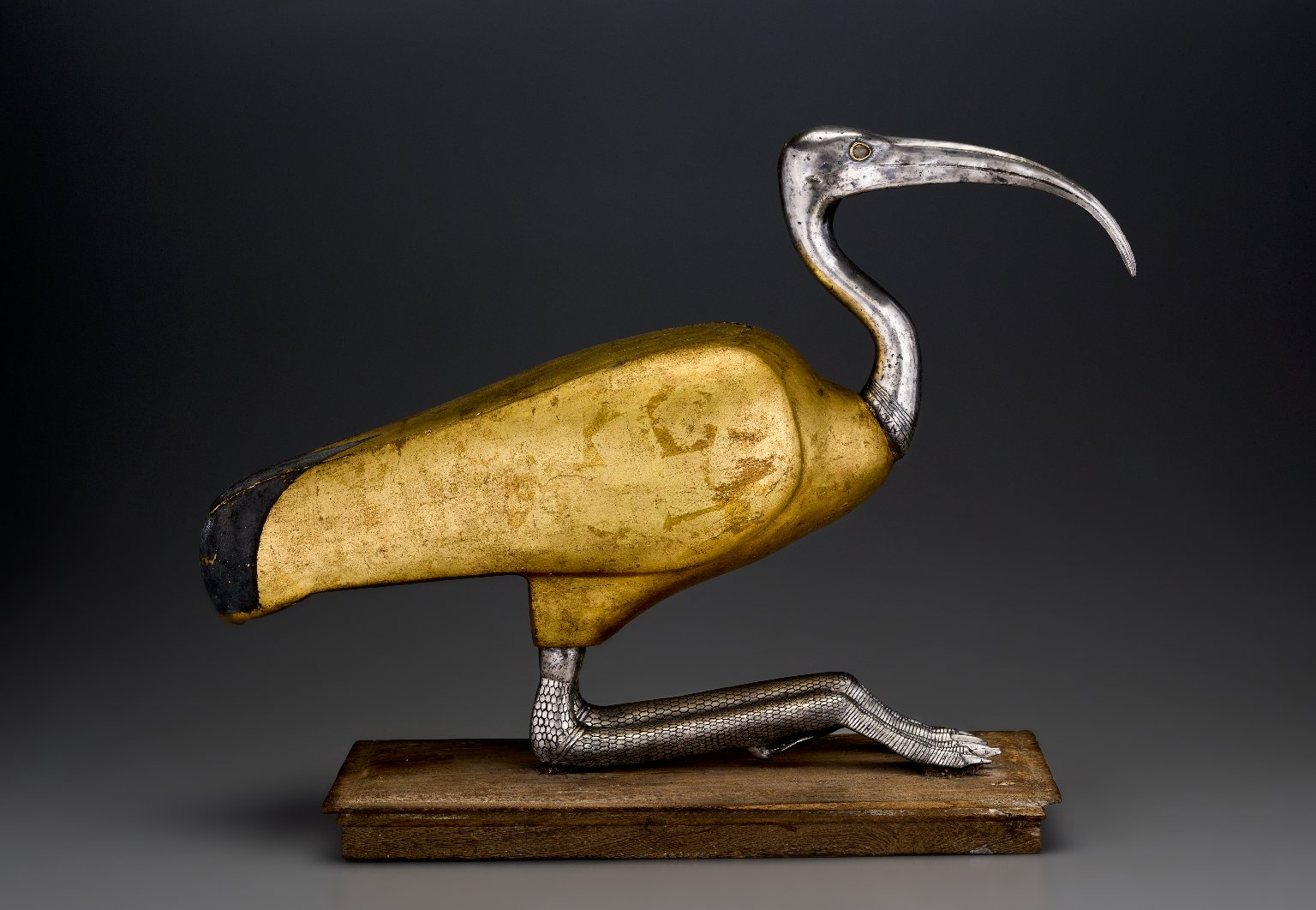
Ibis coffin, 305 BCE–30 BCE; Brooklyn Museum

The ibis cult was established primarily during the Ptolemaic and Roman periods and was dedicated to the god of wisdom, Thoth. Research from 2015 using 14C radiocarbon dating suggests that the Egyptian ibis mummies in the study were from time frame that falls between approximately 450 BCE and 250 BCE. This timing falls in Egyptian history between the Late Period to the Ptolemaic Period. Saqqara alone is estimated to contain nearly 500,000 of these mummies and is also thought to have produced 10,000 mummified offerings per year. In addition, approximately four million ibis burials have been uncovered at the catacombs of Tuna el-Gebel.

Mummification of the ibis included desiccation and evisceration. Usually, the head and neck of the bird were bent backwards and pressed on the body. The body was then dipped in tar and wrapped tightly with linen. The vast number of mummified ibises suggests that this was done in a mass production, as many times the mummies contained only a part of the body. After serving their ritual purposes, the mummified bodies were placed in ceramic pots, coffins or sarcophagi.

===== Baboons =====
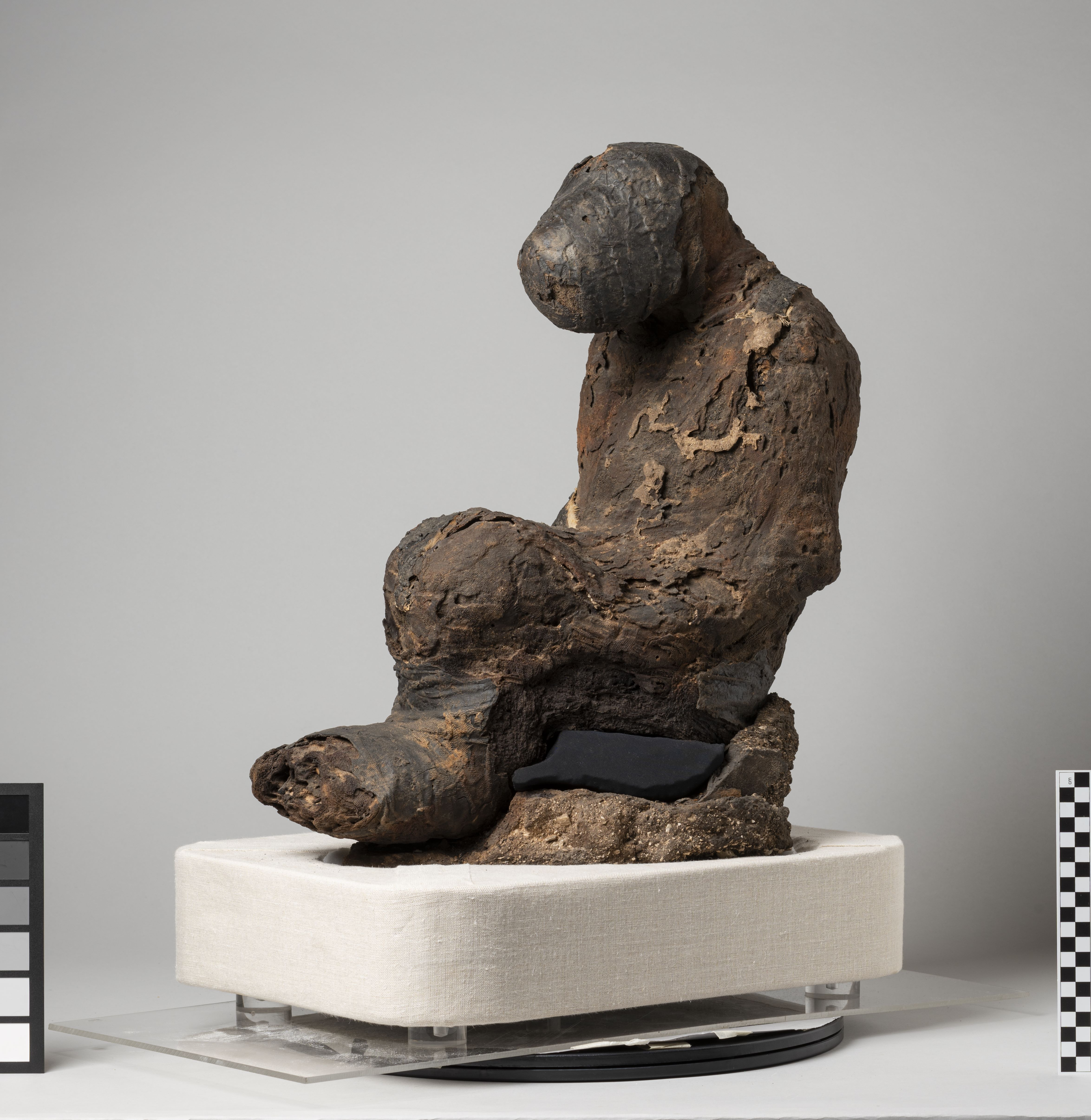
Baboon mummy of the Third Intermediate Period – Late Period, 740–400 BCE. Museo Egizio, Turin (C.2345). It's a seated position on what appears to be a low stool or cushion made of loosely woven and blackened (maybe by resin) textile reinforced with mud, coarse sand, and gravel. The right-hand rests on the lap, while the left hand has slightly slipped down along the thigh. The tail curves around the right side of the body.

Baboons represented Thoth, the god of the moon as well as the god of wisdom. The appearance of baboons on canopic jars, which housed the organs of human mummies, is testament of the animals’ cultural significance. Baboons were reared in mass quantities at temples, though the numbers of baboon mummies that have been discovered are not as large as cats or ibises. Around 400 were uncovered at the tombs of Saqqara. Most baboons were mummified with the use of plaster and buried in wooden chests. Baboon mummies that have been discovered have provided significant evidence that they were bred and mummified as offerings. This evidence includes proof that the baboons usually did not die from natural causes, and that the majority suffered from malnutrition, fractures, osteomyelitis, and vitamin D deficiency.

Baboon mummy of the Third Intermediate Period – Late Period, 740–400 BCE. Museo Egizio, Turin (C.2345)

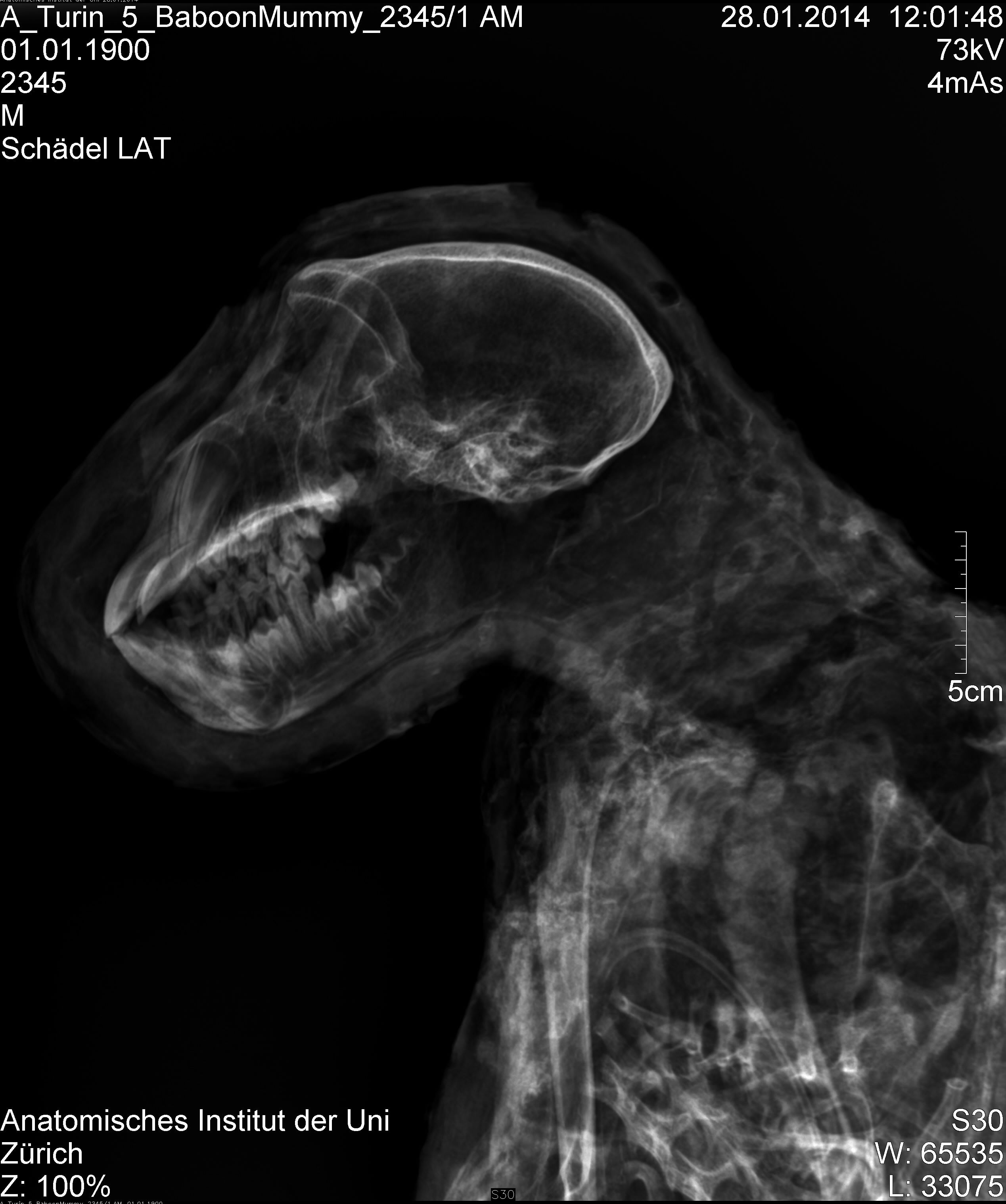
Radiography of a baboon mummy. The animal is wrapped in a variety of linens. They are for the most part hidden under a coating of resinous substances, thus only some fabrics can be identified. They are visible through gaps at the shoulder, arms, and knees.

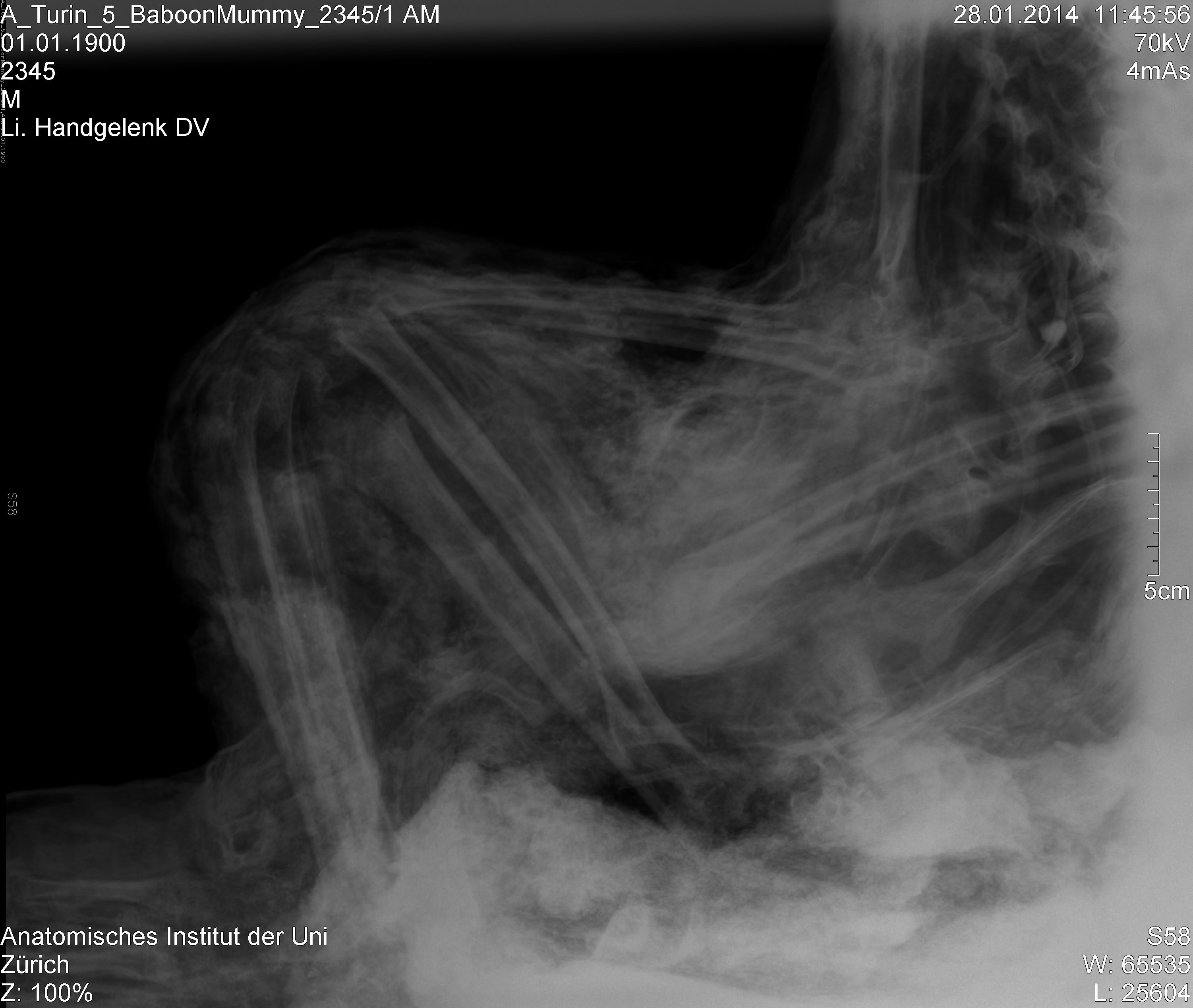
The foot area is broken. The lower section of the thoracic cavity appears to have been eviscerated, and some bandages were introduced into the body.

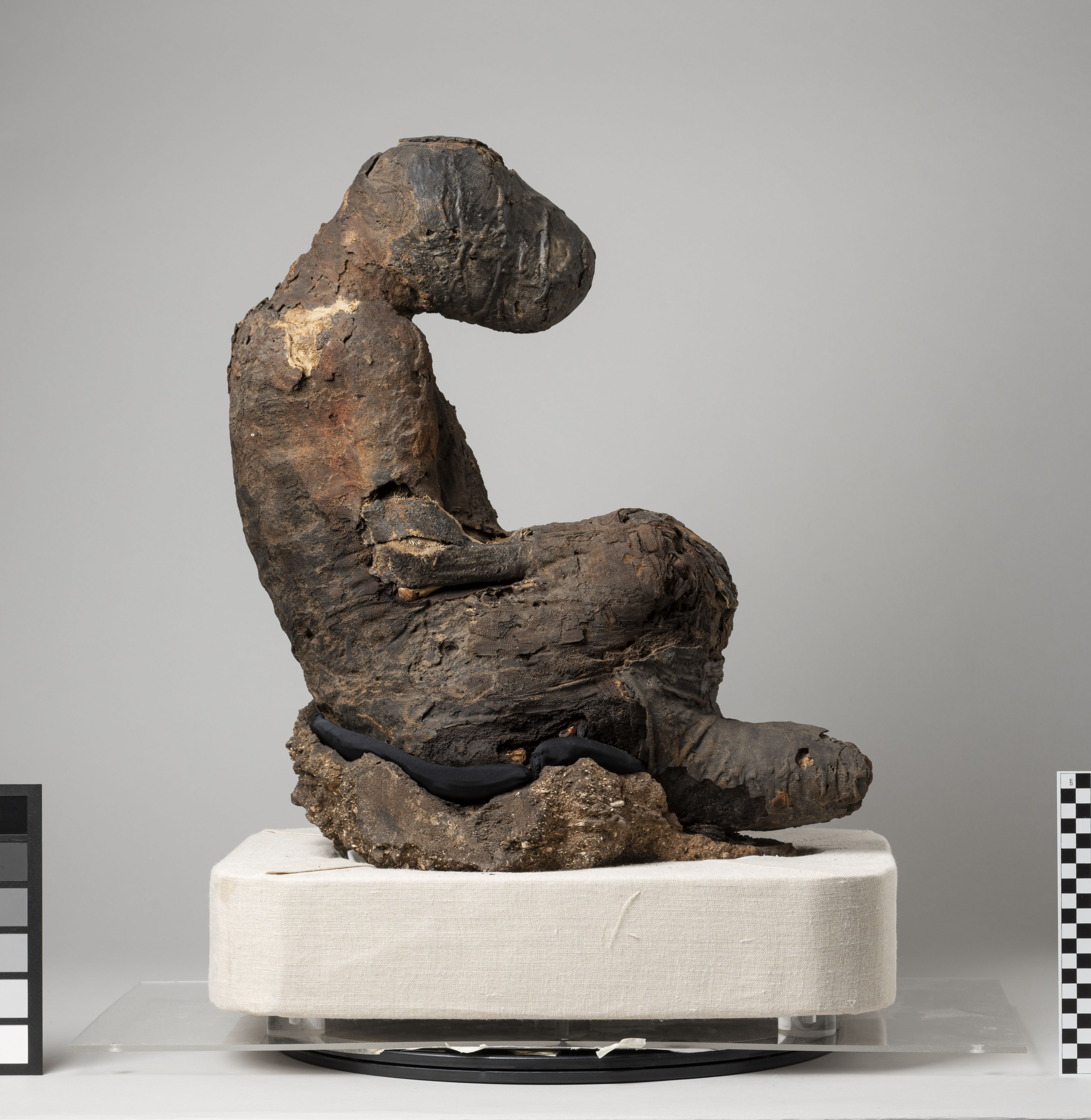
The animal is a male juvenile baboon (probably Papio anubis) The head is padded with bandages. A rope-type element (probably twisted linen) was wrapped around it, followed by more textiles, wrapping also around the whole body.

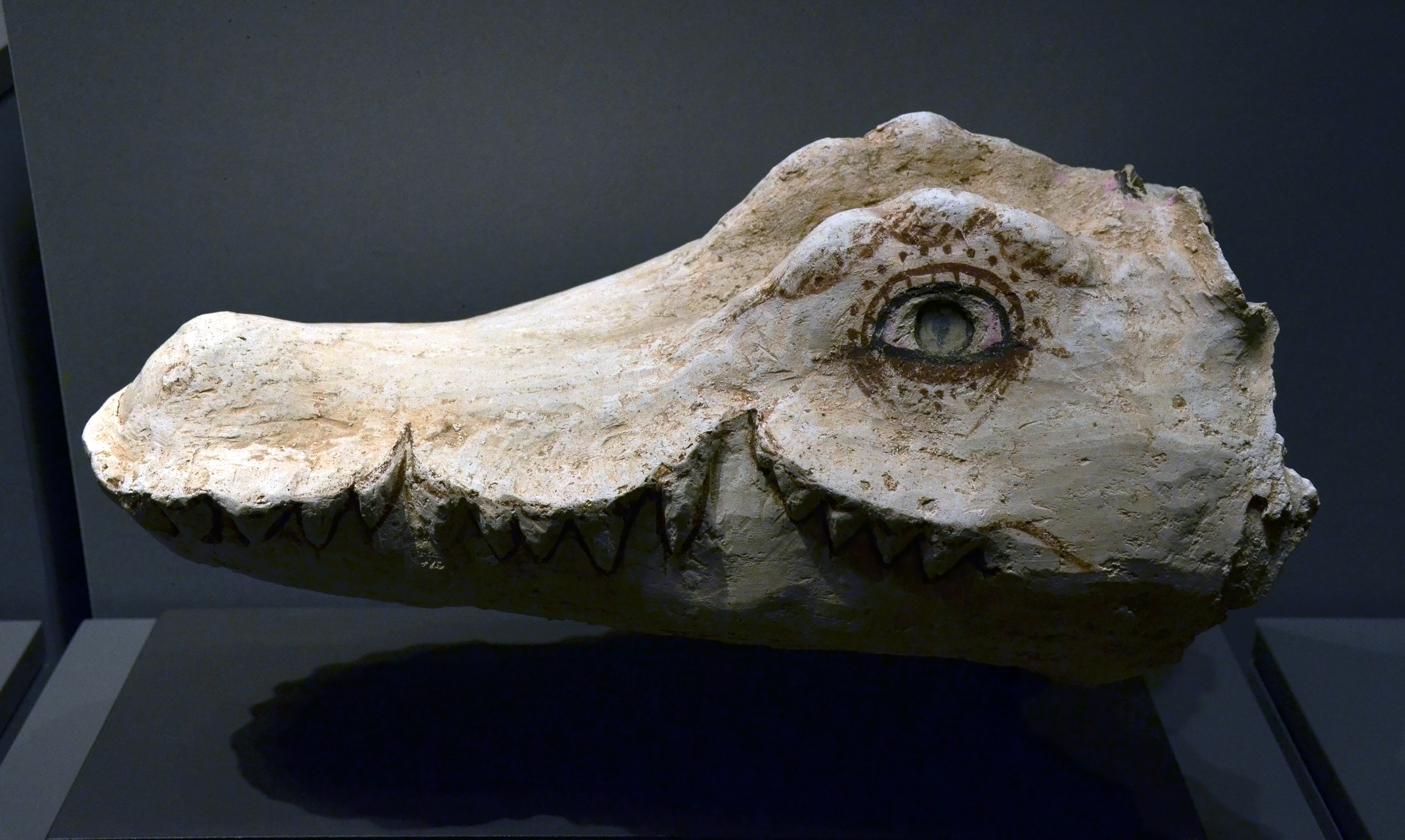
Mummy mask for a crocodile, Roman period. Staatliche Sammlung für Ägyptische Kunst, Munich.

===== Crocodiles =====
The crocodile was regarded as an extremely fierce animal, often used to terrify enemies during war. The crocodile cult was devoted to Sobek, god of fertility, and the sun god, Ra. Typically, crocodiles were raised in a life of complete luxury, indulged until they died. In the early years of this cult, dead crocodiles were lavishly mummified with gold and other precious things. However, as mummification gradually became a production process, less effort was exerted in their mummification and eventually consisted simply of cloth wrappings and the application of resin, a preserving agent. When found in extremely large quantities, crocodile mummies, like many other sorts of animal offerings, contained only reeds or random body parts. At the main temple of Shedet, later called Crocodilopolis, sacred crocodiles were mummified and displayed in temple shrines or carried in processions.

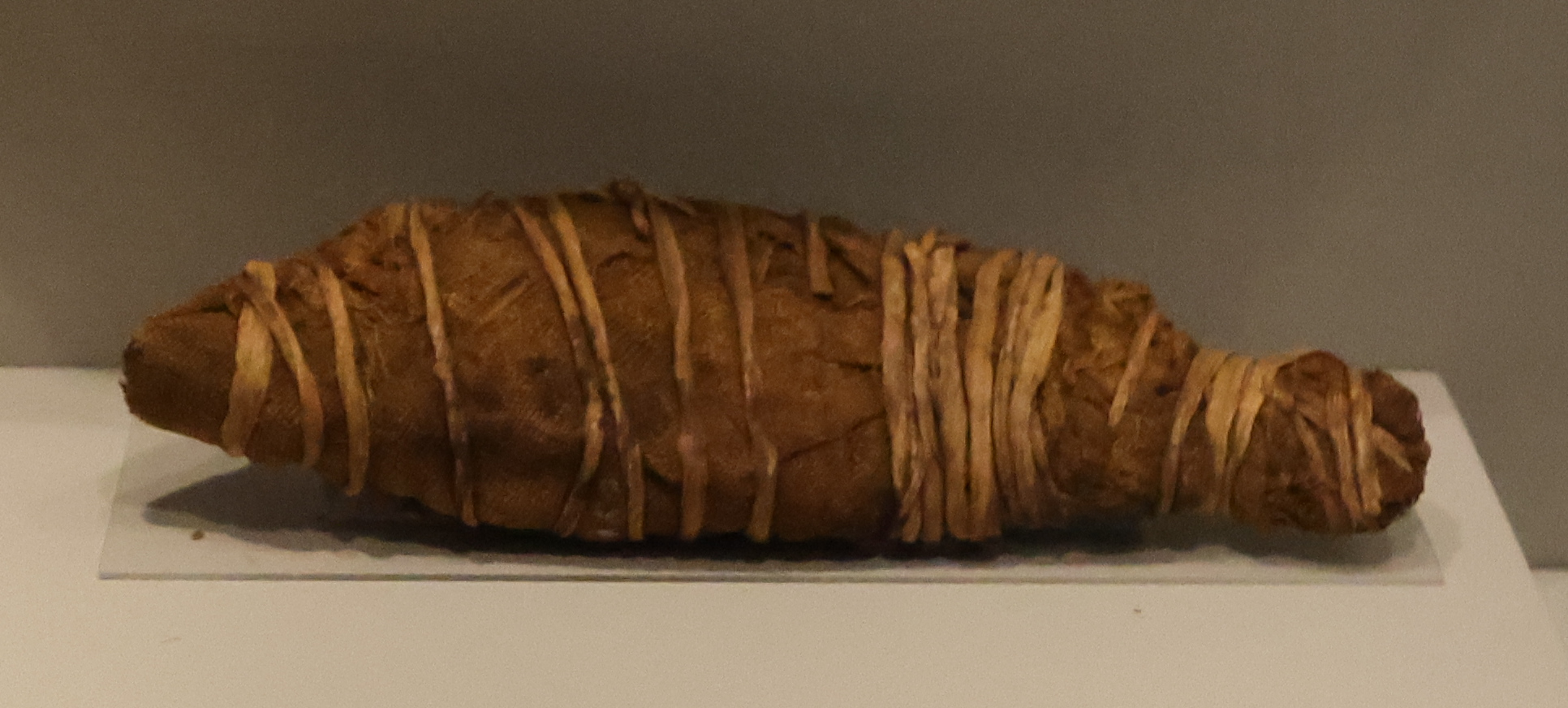
A mummified Nile perch from Esna

===== Fish =====
Fish were mummified in mass quantities as offerings to the deities. They were wrapped in linen and held together by bands of cloth soaked in sticky resin, permanently encasing the mummies. Many times, black circles representing the eyes were painted on the hardened linen. Several species of fish have been identified, but due to the deteriorating condition of the mummies, scientists are unable to conclude if the organs were typically removed during the process of mummification. According to the Museum of Liverpool, the Nile perch was one of the species mummified and offered to the gods; one of these cults is related to the goddess Neith. A deposit of several thousand mummified perch was excavated in an area to the west of Esna where there was a temple to Neith. Mummified perch have also been found at Gurob near a temple to Neith.

===== Miscellaneous =====
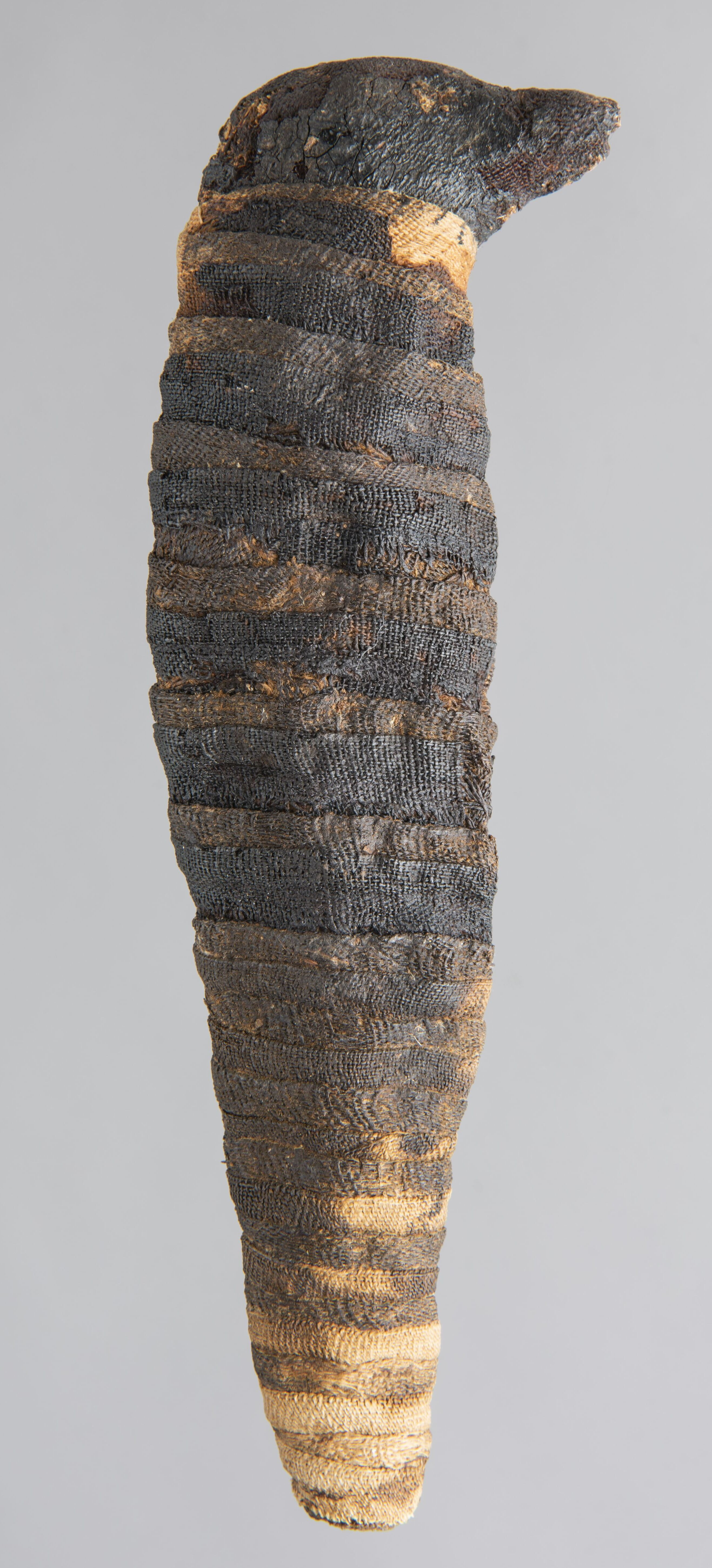
Mummy of a shrew, from Asyūṭ. Museo Egizio, Turin (S.8191).

Additional animals mummified and the corresponding god they represented:

- Mongooses and Shrews (Horus)
  - A large type of mongoose common in Africa, the ichneumon (Herpestes ichneumon) is represented in Egyptian art from the Old Kingdom onward. Revered for its ability to kill snakes, the ichneumon was related to Horus and Atum, among others, and worshipped throughout the country. The shrew, a mouse-sized nocturnal mammal, substituted for ichneumons in Egyptian mythology. Believed to have vision in both light and darkness, the god Khenty-irty, a form of Horus worshipped in Letopolis, was represented by the wide-eyed type of ichneumon and the shrew respectively. Shrews appear as the focus of worship particularly in the Late Period.
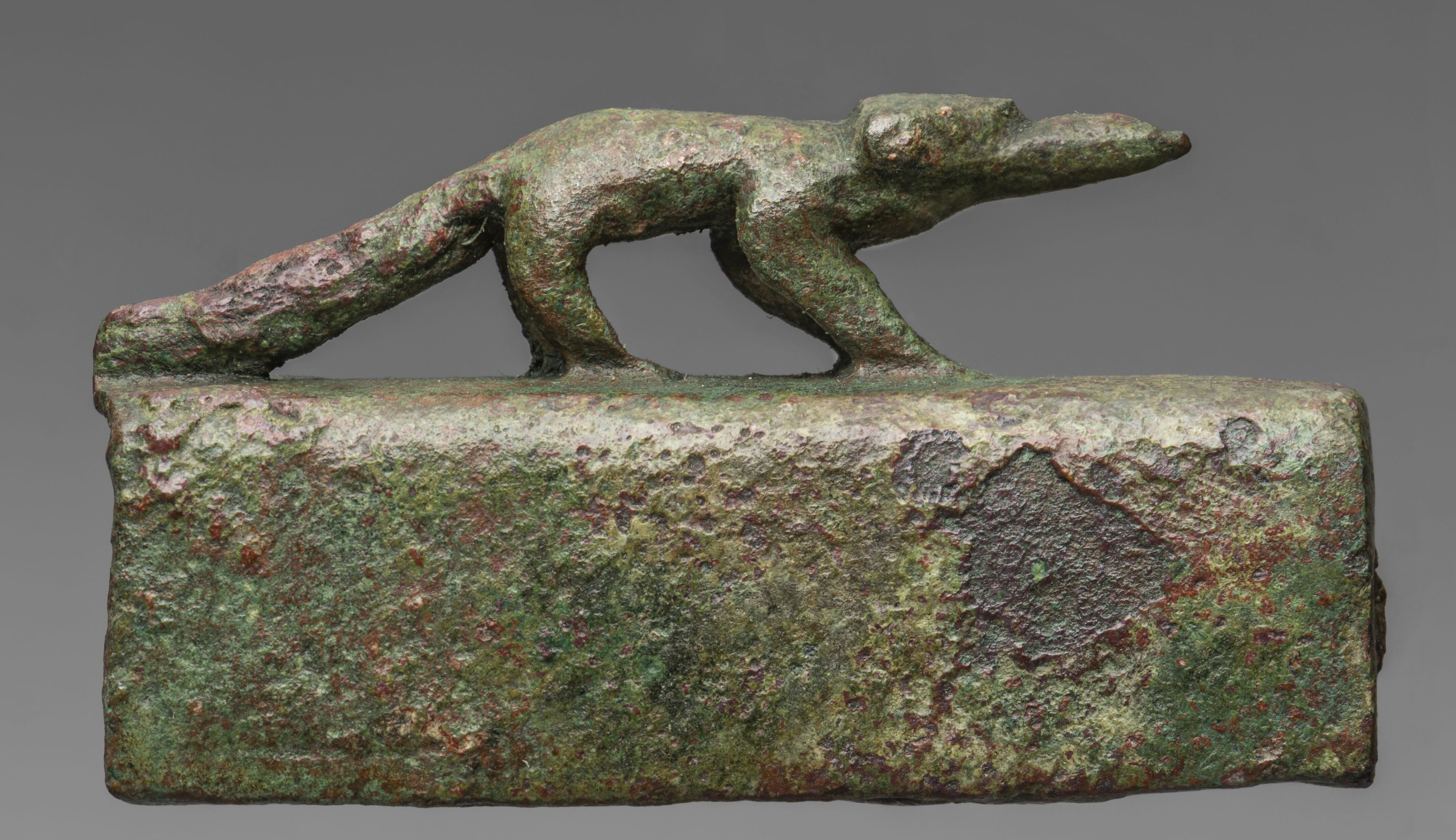
Coffin for a shrew, bronze. Between 722 and 332 BCE, Late Period. Museo Egizio, Turin (S.18099)

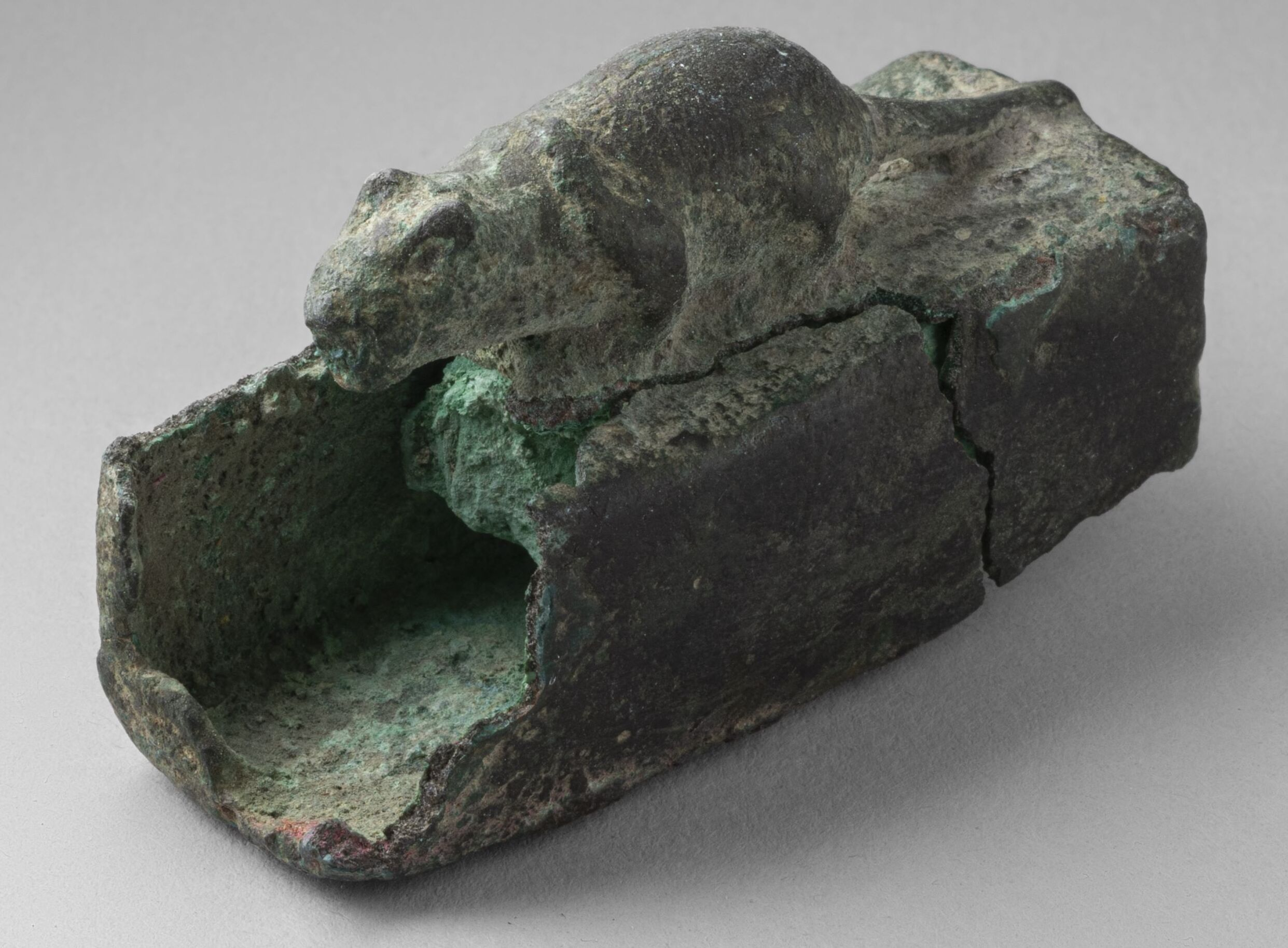
Coffin for a mongoose, bronze. Between 722 and 332 BC, Late Period. Museo Egizio, Turin (S.19134/A)

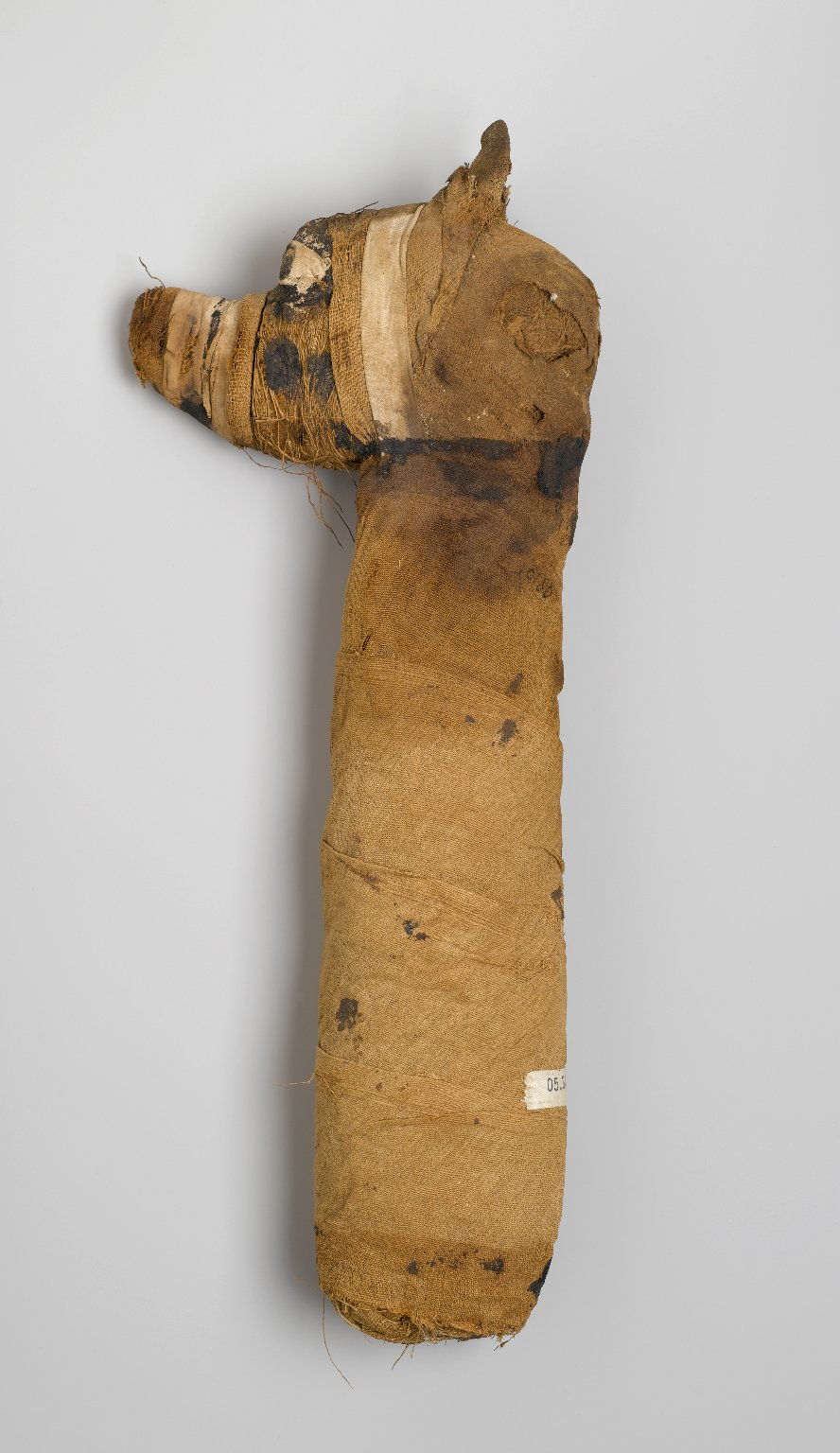
Dog mummy, 305 BC – 395 CE; Brooklyn Museum

- Dogs and Jackals (Anubis)
  - Dogs were used as domestic pets, guardians, herders, and police assistants. Several dog breeds could be found in ancient Egypt, the most popular being the greyhound, basenji, and saluki, all very good for hunting. From the First Dynasty, Egyptians venerated several jackal deities, with the most prominent being Anubis. He was represented as a canine or a canine-headed human. Traditionally, the Anubis animal has been identified as a jackal, but its generally black coloring, symbolic of the afterlife and rebirth, is not typical of jackals and may instead denote a wild dog. Because dogs and jackals roamed the desert's edge, where the dead were generally buried, they were seen as protectors of cemeteries.

Two coffins for falcons, containing mummies. Museo Egizio, Turin (C.2374, C.2375)

- Birds of all types (Horus)
  - Poultry intended for victual mummies were placed in containers shaped like food, whereas pets or birds intended to serve as messengers to the gods were given their own proper mummification.

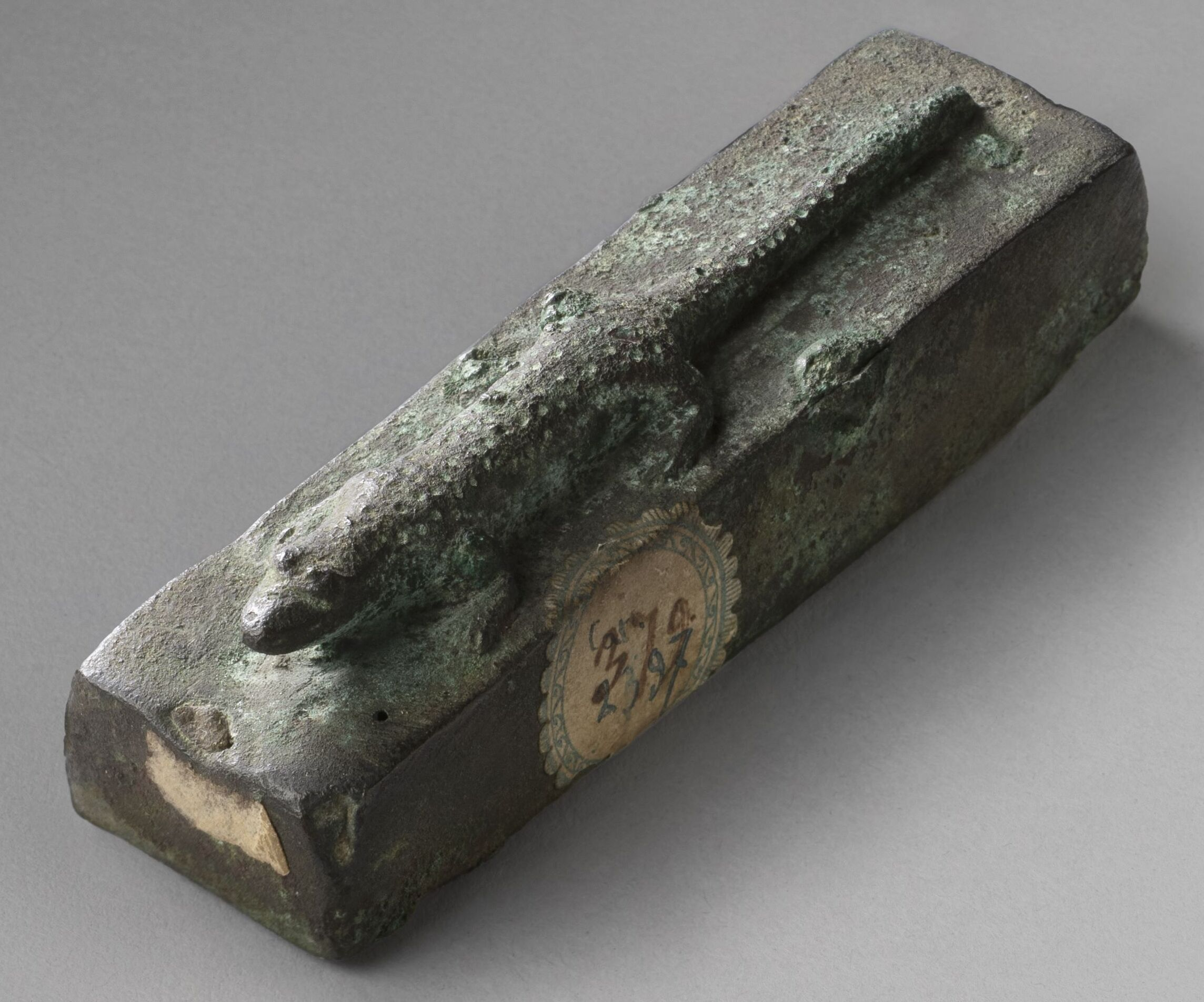
Coffin for a lizard or a skink, bronze. 722-332 BCE, Late Period. Museo Egizio, Turin (C.2397)

- Snakes and Lizards (Atum)
  - Snakes and lizards, as well as eels, were popular depictions of the god Atum. Serpents were seen as creatures of the earth that embodied primeval, chthonic qualities, involved in the process of creation. Because many snakes inhabit marshes, they were closely linked to water and the primeval ocean of Nun. Egyptians were well aware of both the snake's usefulness in controlling vermin and the dangers posed by its venom. Texts like the Brooklyn Papyrus include remedies and magical spells to cure the bitten. Snake deities were worshipped in hopes of preventing potential attacks by their earthly representatives. While lizards did not play much of a role in the early culture of ancient Egypt, they were commonly mummified during the Late, Ptolemaic and Roman periods.
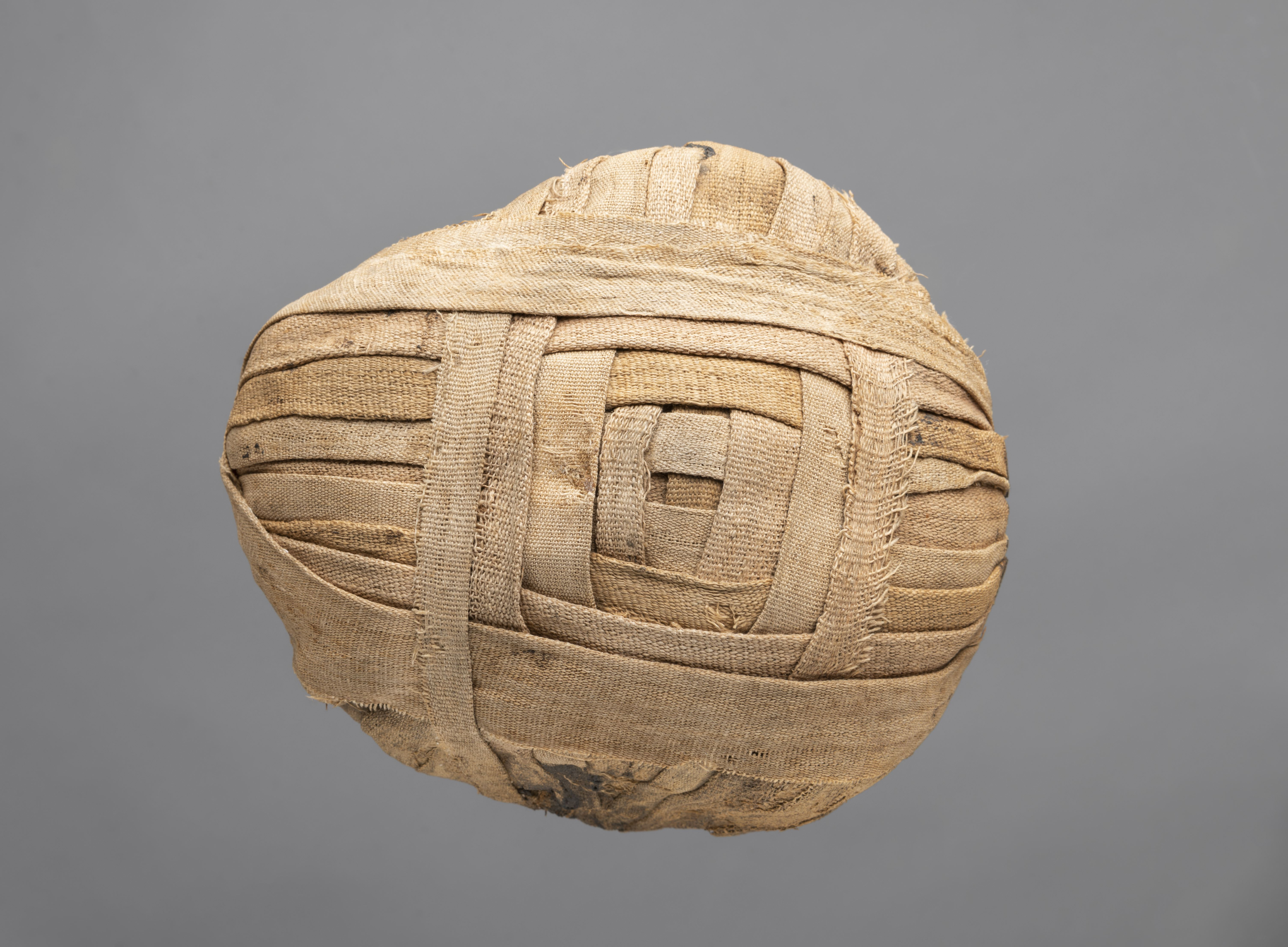
Snake mummy. 750-390 BC, Third Intermediate Period/Late Period. Museo Egizio, Turin (P.6110).
- Beetles (Khepri)
  - Among beetles, the scarab was very popular in Egyptian culture. Images of scarabs were placed in tombs as early as the fourth millennium BCE and used as official seals and amulets for the living and the dead. The Egyptian word for scarab also means "to come into being" or "appear". A scarab pushing a spherical object evoked the image of a beetle propelling the sun disk through heaven. While it is known that scarab beetles were mummified, only a few extremely rare specimens have been found.

==== Sacred animals ====
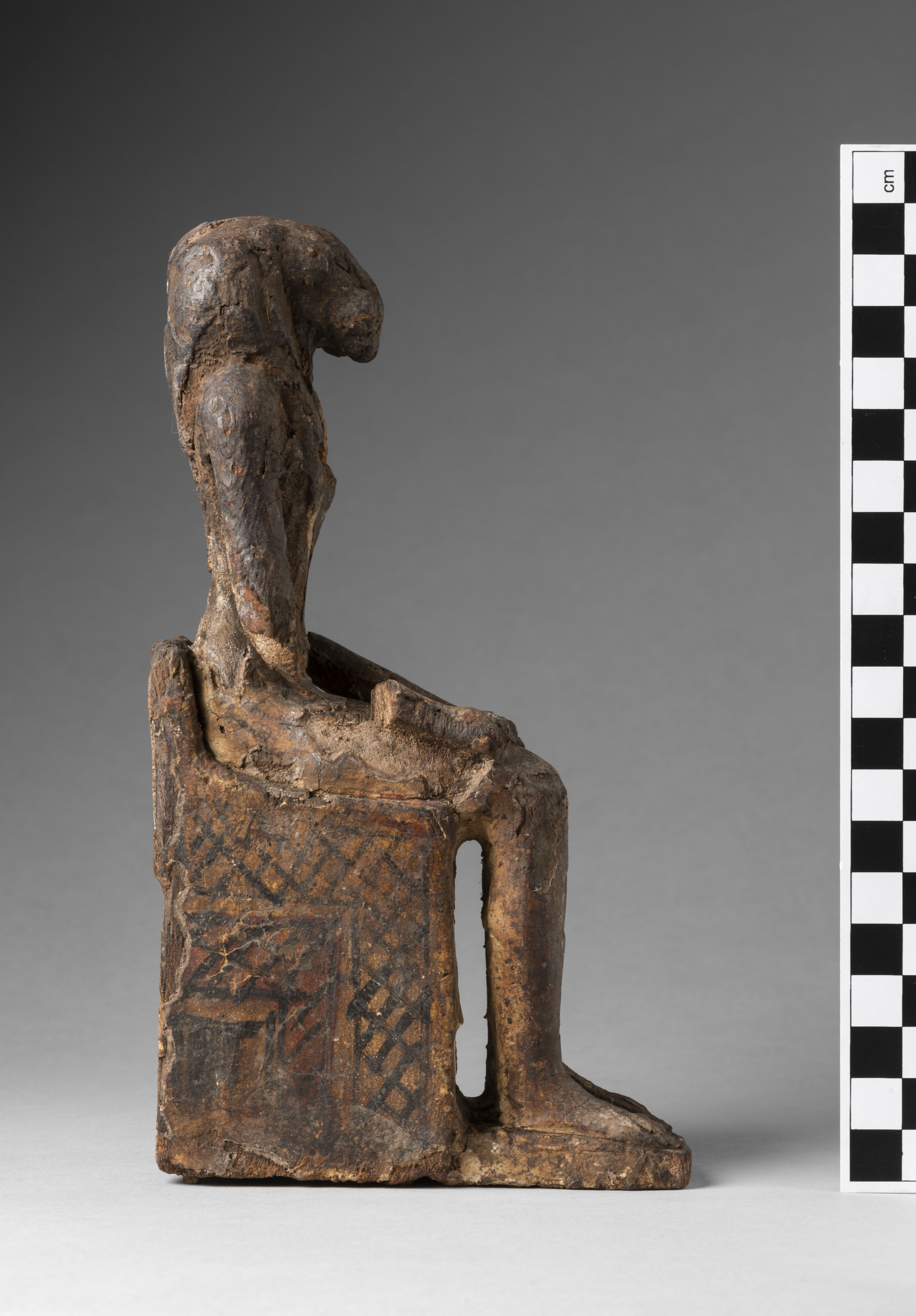
Coffin probably for a cat, wood. Based on parallels in bronze, the figure can be identified as the goddess Wadjet. The base of the throne is now empty, but it possibly contained a shrew, mongoose, snake or cat mummy. Museo Egizio, Turin (C.2368).

Instead of making offerings of large numbers of mummified animals of a particular species, a few cults would select one specific animal, chosen because of its special markings, to be the living totem of the particular god. Each sacred animal was pampered and cared for until its death, when elaborate burial proceedings took place. The animal was then mummified as a sign of respect to the deity. Next, a new symbolic animal was chosen to serve as the sacred one; only a single individual at a time carried out this role. These animal cults reached the pinnacle of popularity during the Late and Greco-Roman periods. The cycle of selecting a new totem animal continued for hundreds of years. Though the animals were undoubtedly considered sacred, Egyptians did not worship the individual animal itself, but rather the invisible spirit they believed was present within the animal symbolizing the god. In certain cases, such as the Apis bull, the animal could even be a way to communicate the desires of the deity. The Apis bull cult was the main source of this type of religious animal mummy in ancient Egypt, as most other animals were mummified in large quantities for religious offerings.

===== Bulls =====
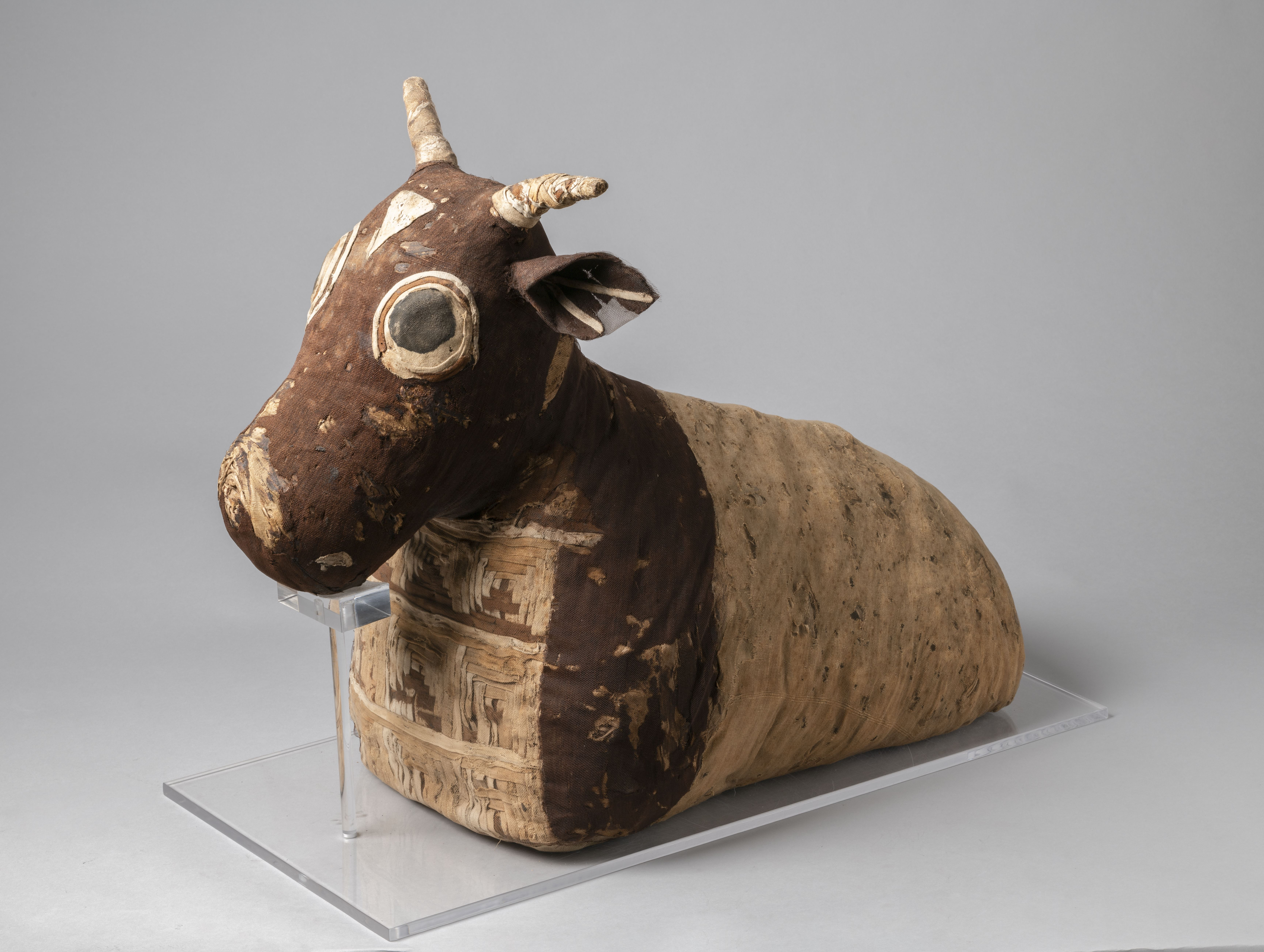
Mummy of a bull. Late Period / Hellenistic Period, 305–30 BCE. Museo Egizio, Turin (C.2343/02).

The Apis bull cult is estimated to have originated as early as 800 BCE, the first cult supported by archaeological evidence. The earliest and largest of all animal cults, the Apis bull cult considered the bull to be a symbol of strength and fertility, representing the creator gods Ptah and Osiris. Mummification was a key part in the worshipping of these animals. While alive, the bull would be housed in a special temple, lavishly pampered for its entire life. Priests believed that the Apis bull was a medium of communication between the two creator gods, so its movements were carefully observed and sometimes consulted as an oracle.

These sacred animals were allowed to die a natural death unless they reached the age of 28, at which time they were killed. When an Apis bull died, the entire country went into mourning. It was afforded an elaborate funeral and intricate burial procedures. Because the bulls were so large, the process of mummification was lengthy and complicated. Enormous alabaster embalming tables were constructed at Memphis, the center of the cult. They were complete with engravings and fluid drainage channels. After the funerary ceremonies, the bull would be transported to these tables where it would be strapped to the table. Its internal organs would be destroyed through intra-anal oils. The animal's body would be dried out using natron salts and packed with sand. It would then be wrapped in linens. Artificial eyes and an artistic plaster head would be added, ensuring the bull still looked like itself.

Cattle mummy of the Late Period – Hellenistic Period, 540–210 BCE. Museo Egizio, Turin (C.2343/01)

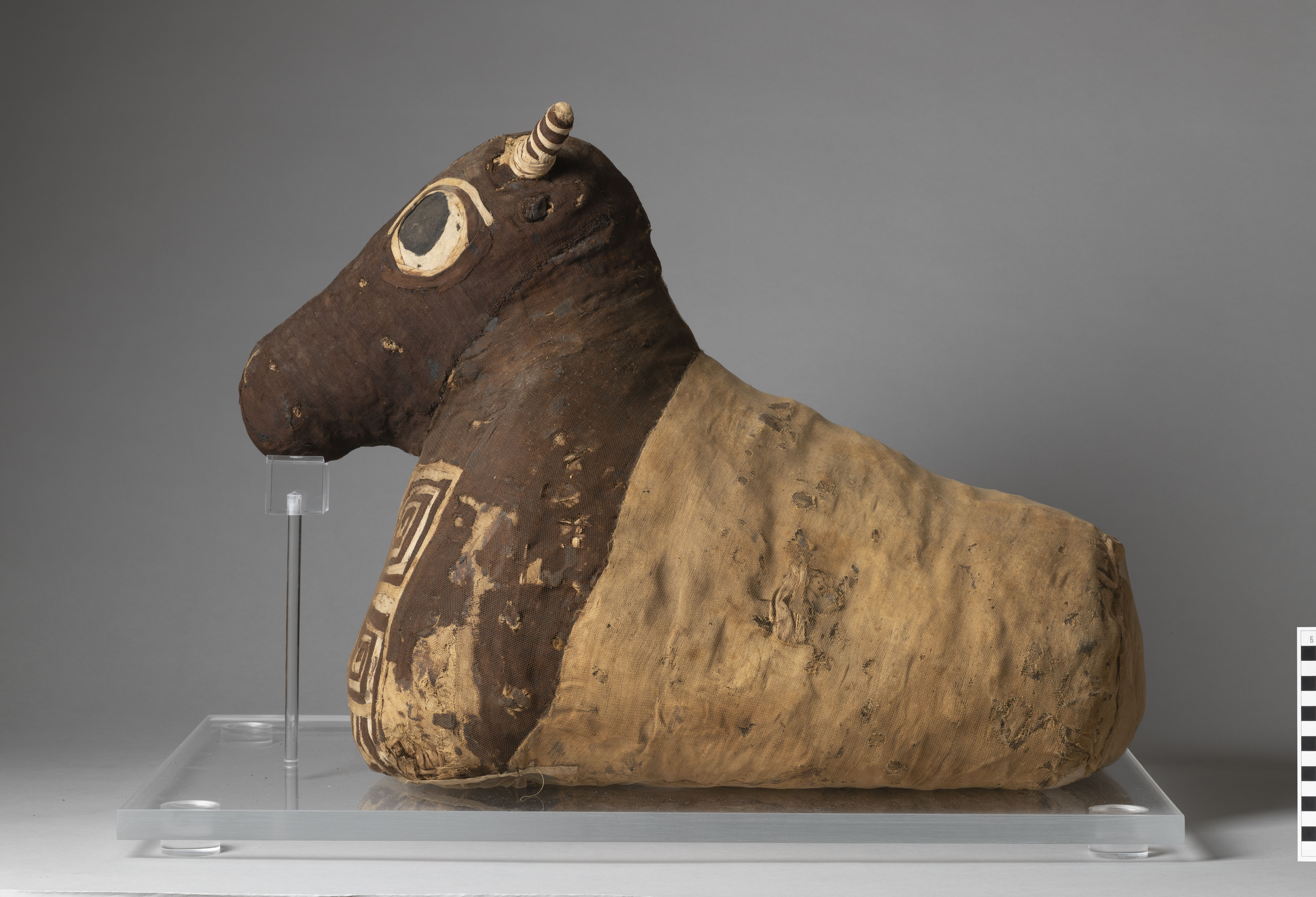
Cattle mummy representing a seated animal. The head is lifelike, while the body is rendered as a rough trapezoid. The head and forepart of the body are covered in a dark brown fabric, while the rest of the animal is covered with an undyed cloth. Underneath the undyed cloth, several other textile fabrics have been used as a stuffing.

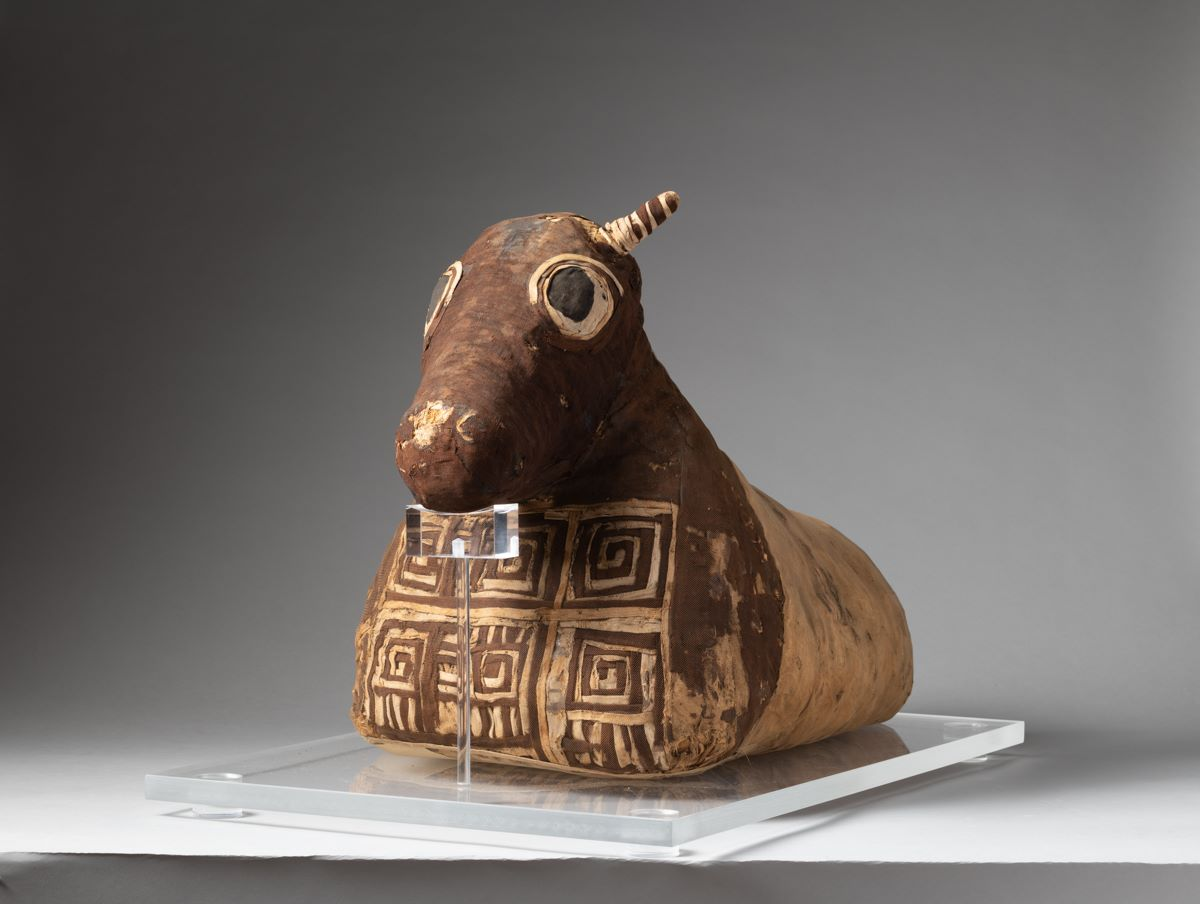
Only one horn is preserved: it is made of linen, papyrus, and several linen bandages, which were then further covered with bandages in an alternating pattern. The other horn has broken off, as the ears. Details of the muzzle are appliquéd or painted on the brown background, and a piece of textile, also brown, with self-bands can be seen.

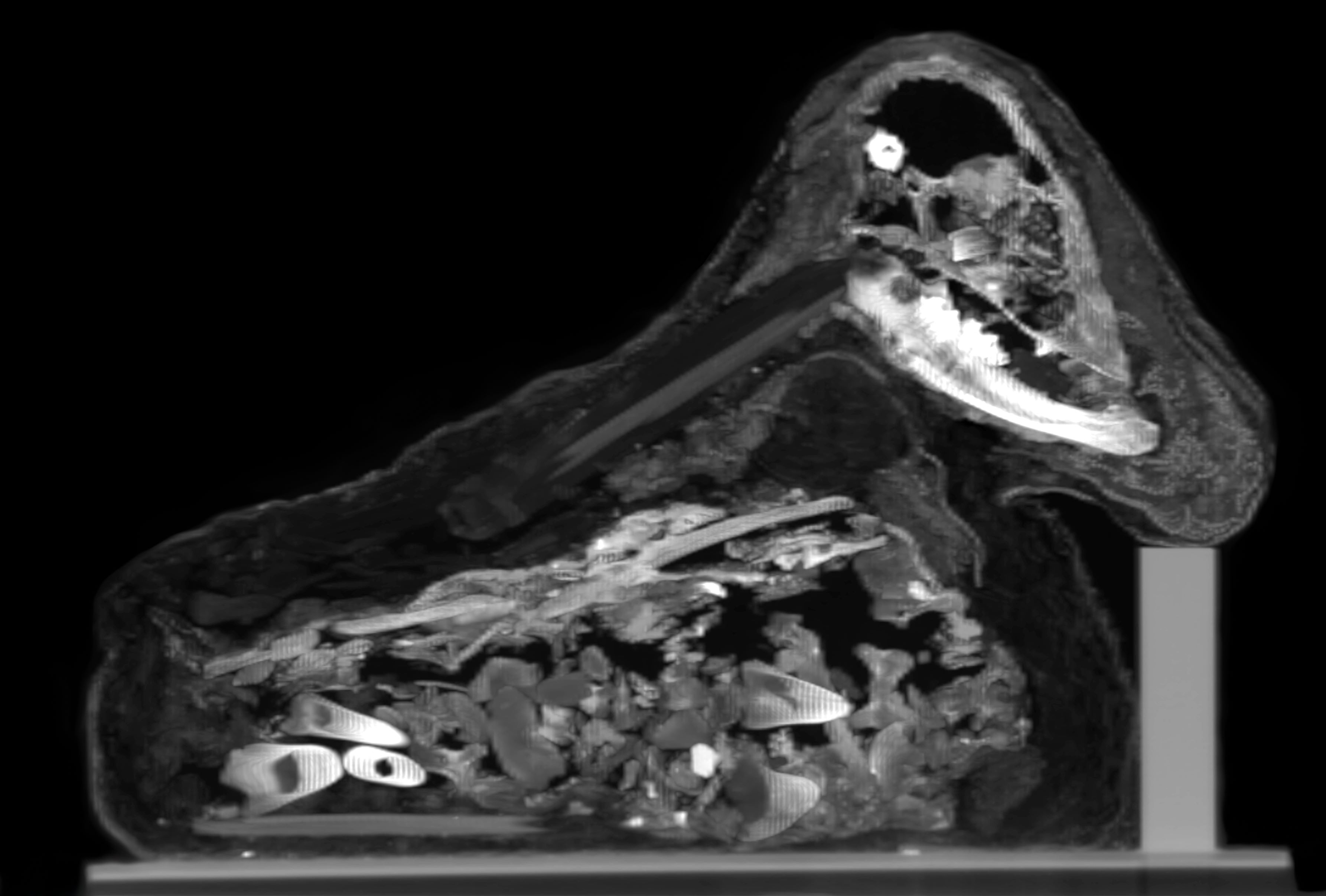
The mummy bundle consists of a skull, without horns, placed in the position suggested by the wrappings. The rest of the animal is incomplete and consists of disarticulated, skeletonised, bones. The animal was juvenile. The calf was not excerebrated.

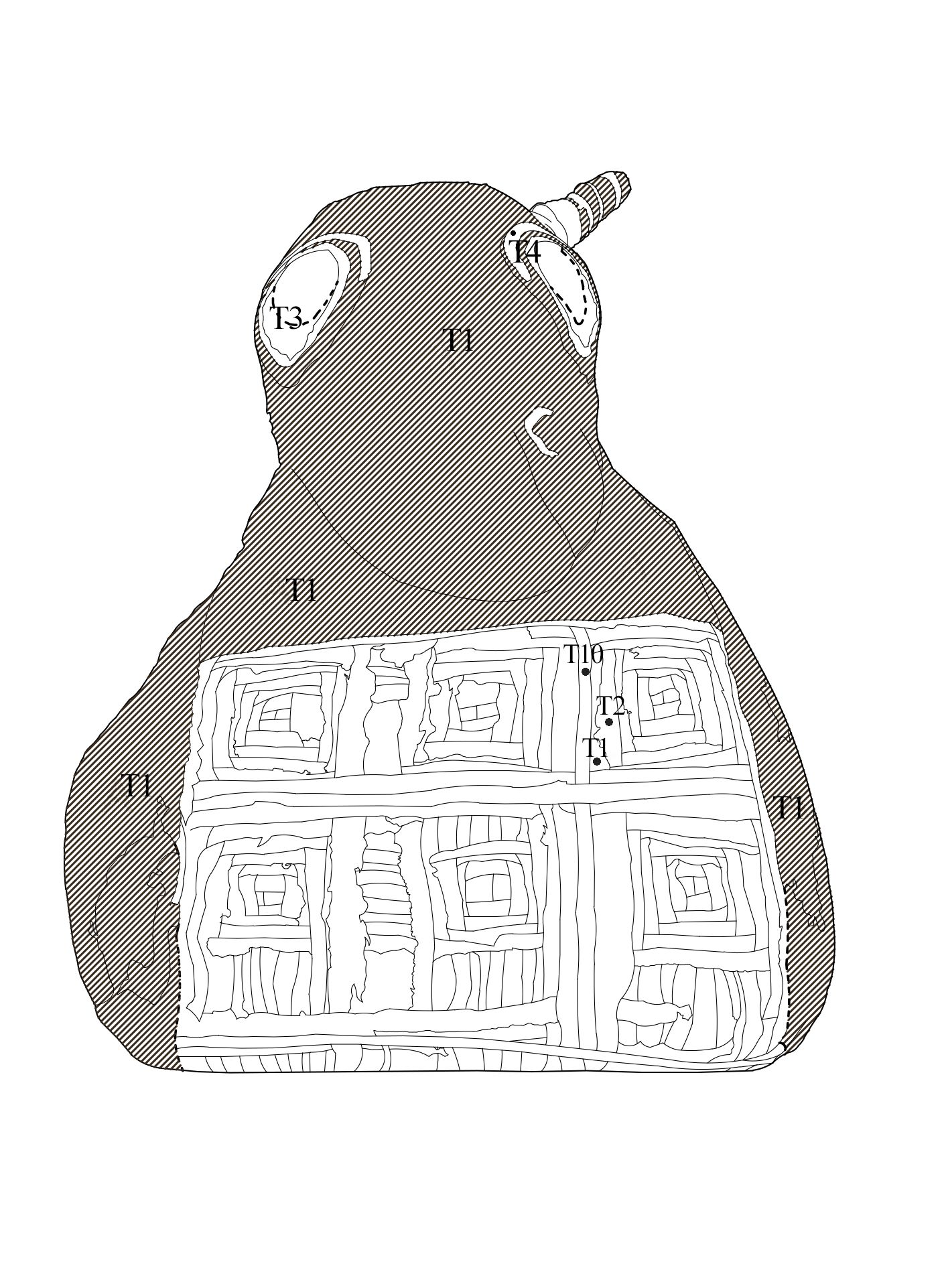
The shape of the mummy is created through a structure of vegetal elements. Fragments of stone and gravel are interspersed within the wrappings, and a thick layer of papyrus pith strips reinforces the bone bundle in the centre of the mummy.

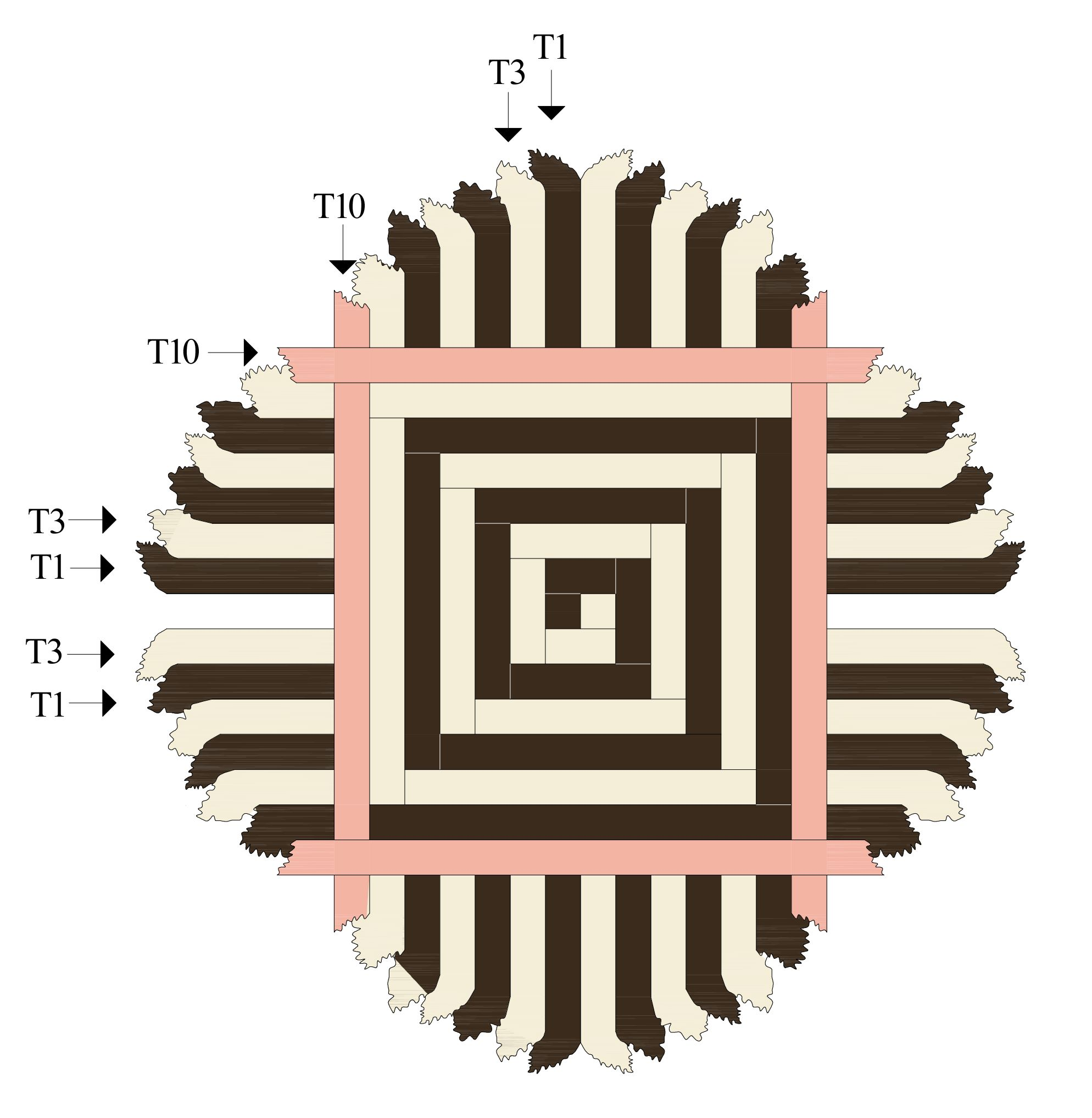
Scheme of the bendages

===== Rams =====
The cult of the fertility god Khnum in Elephantine made mummies of the sacred ram.

== Differences between human and non-human animal mummification ==
Radiography of a gazelle mummy of Egyptian Roman Period, 10–380 CE. Museo Egizio, Turin (S.1599). The animal was wrapped in linen after being eviscerated, desiccated, and anointed with oils and resins. Some loose-weave, somewhat coarse pieces of linen have been used to pad the body. Then strips of papyrus were wrapped around it repeatedly, creating a cohesive supporting meshwork that would also make the artefact thicker and protect the skeleton. A shroud was then used to cover it and is kept in place by a resinous substance. Some larger pieces of this shroud also cover the head.

The distinguishing factor between the process of human and non-human animal mummification is when the two types were mummified. Human mummification became a consistent practice in the days of the early conquerors of Lower Egypt, hundreds of years before the first animal was mummified. The earliest signs of non-human animal mummies are dated to the Badarian Predynastic period (5500–4000 BCE), before the unification of Upper and Lower Egypt. It is likely that animal mummies did not exist earlier on because mummification was less accessible, primarily due to cost.

In general, the mummifying of animals was not given the careful attention afforded to humans. Mummies sold to pilgrims as offerings were only minimally treated. Unlike humans, even the most sacred of animals, such as the Apis bulls, did not have their internal organs preserved. The large scale of production of votive mummies indicates that relatively little care and expense was involved in animal preparation compared to human mummies. However, recent radiological studies by archaeologists indicate that animal mummification may more closely follow human mummification than was originally thought. The predominant view is that animals were merely wrapped in coarse linen bandages and/or dipped in resin after death. However, as with human mummification, there was a range in terms of the quality of treatments. A simple visual analysis of the mummies suggests that some animal mummies were treated with the same complexity as those of humans. The presence of fats, oils, beeswax, sugar gum, petroleum bitumen, and coniferous cedar resins in animal mummies shows that the chemicals used to embalm animals were similar to those used on humans.
