= Mu Ko Samui =

Archipelago in the Gulf of Thailand

Mu Ko Samui is a group of islands in the Gulf of Thailand. Together the islands have a population of 78,000 (2012). The islands are split among 3 different districts :

- Amphoe Ko Samui
- Amphoe Ko Pha Ngan
- Amphoe Khanom

== Table of Islands ==
Nr	Island	District	Province	Capital	Other Cities	Area (km²)	Population (Note: Island area and population data retrieved from the 2012 census)	Notes
1	Amphoe Ko Pha Ngan	Amphoe Ko Pha Ngan	Surat Thani Province	Thong Sala	Mae Hat	147.0	15,435	District is in Mu Ko Samui.
1.1	Ko Pha Ngan	Amphoe Ko Pha Ngan	Surat Thani Province	Thong Sala	Wat Khao Tam, Ban Tai, Ban Nok	125.0	13,705	
1.2	Ko Maa	Amphoe Ko Pha Ngan	Surat Thani Province	Green Bar Beach		0.1	2	
1.3	Ko Nang Yuan	Amphoe Ko Pha Ngan	Surat Thani Province	Nang Yuan Dive Resort		0.44	10	
1.4	Ko Tao	Amphoe Ko Pha Ngan	Surat Thani Province	Mae Hat	Chalok Ban Kao, Hin Wong, Sairee	21	1,713	
1.5	More Ko Pha Ngan Islands	Amphoe Ko Pha Ngan	Surat Thani Province	Ko Tae Nok	Ko Tae Nai, Ko Than Sadet Kong	0.46	5	
2	Amphoe Ko Samui	Amphoe Ko Samui	Surat Thani Province	Nathon	Lipa Noi	270.5	63,000	The district also includes the northern (32 km², population 440) of Mu Ko Ang Thong with Ko Phaluai
2.1	Ko Fan	Amphoe Ko Samui	Surat Thani Province	Ko Fan Noi	Ko Fan Yai	0.07	0	This is the location of Wat Phra Yai, the Big Buddha Temple, adjacent to Bang Rak, Ko Samui
2.2	Ko Mat Lang	Amphoe Ko Samui	Surat Thani Province	Laem Son		0.26	0	
2.3	Ko Matsum	Amphoe Ko Samui	Surat Thani Province	Treasure Resort	Naga Pearl Farm, Nong Matsum	0.31	18	Also known as Mudsum
2.4	Ko Samui	Amphoe Ko Samui	Surat Thani Province	Nathon	Lipa Noi	228.7	62,500	
2.5	Ko Som	Amphoe Ko Samui	Surat Thani Province	Ko Som		0.19	2	
2.6	Ko Taen	Amphoe Ko Samui	Surat Thani Province	Ko Taen	Laem Hua Kruat, Ao Tok, Laem Hua Sai, Ao Ok	7.5	30	
2.7	More Ko Samui Islands	Amphoe Ko Samui	Surat Thani Province			0.47	0	
3	Amphoe Khanom	Amphoe Khanom	Nakhon Si Thammarat Province	Khanom		433,926	28,000	The district includes also a huge part of mainland Thailand.
3.1	Mu Ko Thale Tai	Amphoe Khanom	Nakhon Si Thammarat Province	Ko Rap	Ko Wang Nai, Ko Wang Nak	2.0	2	
	Mu Ko Samui	Mu Ko Samui	Mostly Surat Thani Province	Nathon	Thong Sala	386.5	78,000	
