= Hua Thanon =

Hua Thanon (Thai: หัวถนน) may refer to the following places in Thailand:

- Hua Thanon, Ko Samui, a village in Ko Samui district, Surat Thani province
- Hua Thanon subdistrict in Tha Tako district, Nakhon Sawan province
- Hua Thanon subdistrict in Nang Rong district, Buri Ram province
- Hua Thanon subdistrict in Phanat Nikhom district, Chon Buri province
- Hua Thanon subdistrict in Khlong Khlung district, Kamphaeng Phet province
