= Ko Taen =

Island in the Gulf of Thailand

Thai: เกาะแตน Nickname: Ko Katen
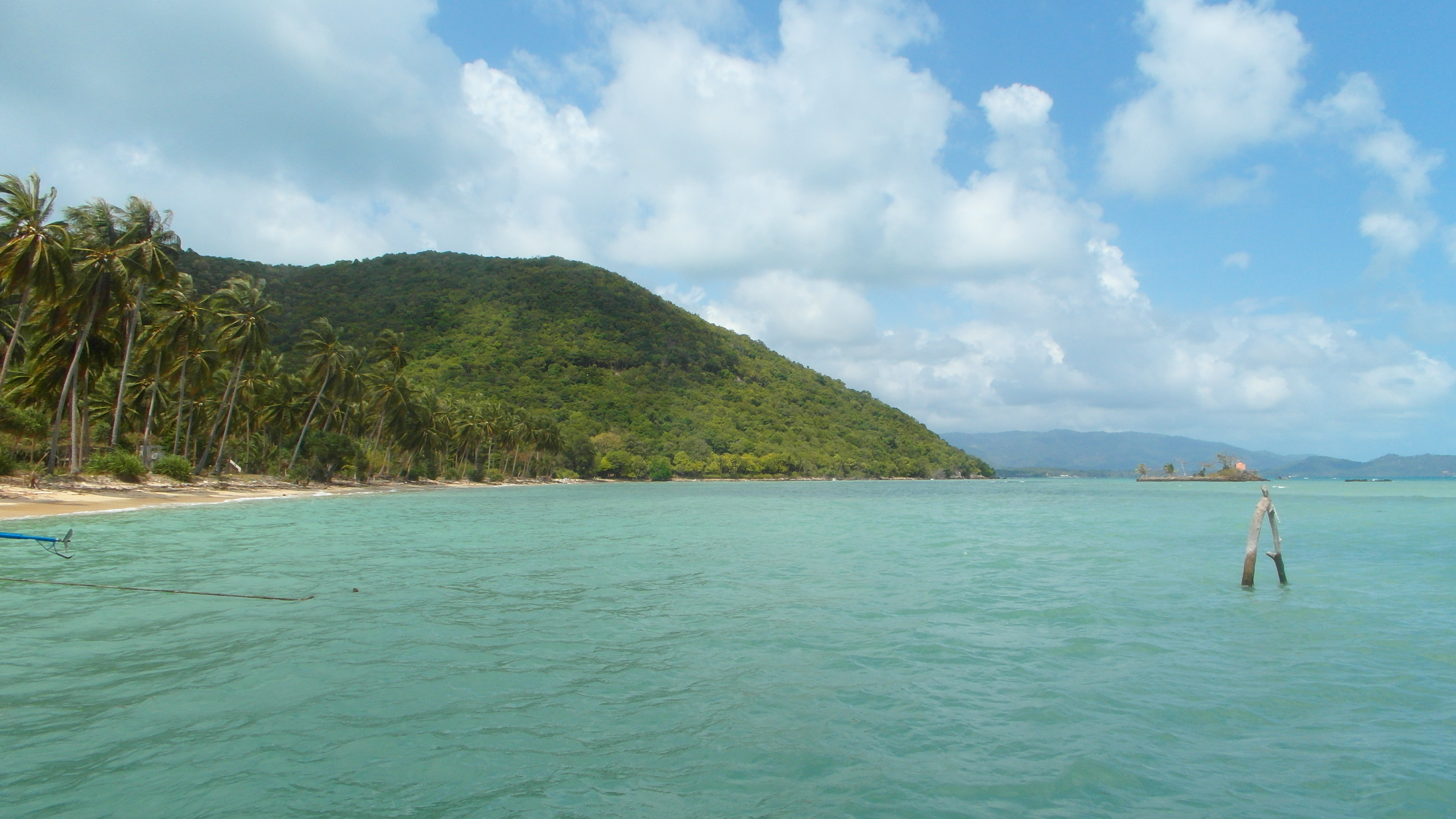
- Ko Taen

- Location within Thailand

Geography
- Location: Gulf of Thailand
- Coordinates: 9°22′N 99°57′E
- Archipelago: Mu Ko Samui
- Total islands: 1
- Area: 7.5 km^{2} (2.9 sq mi)
- Length: 4.4 km (2.73 mi)
- Width: 2.8 km (1.74 mi)

Administration
- Thailand
- Province: Surat Thani Province
- Amphoe: Ko Samui
- Largest settlement: Ban Ko Taen (pop. 20)

Demographics
- Population: 30 (2014)
- Pop. density: 4/km^{2} (10/sq mi)

Ko Taen (Thai: เกาะแตน, pronounced [kɔ̀ʔ tɛ̄ːn]) is an island, approximately 15 kilometers off the mainland and five kilometers south of Ko Samui in the Gulf of Thailand. It is part of the Samui archipelago (Mu Ko Samui, หมู่เกาะสมุย), which includes about 60 other islands. Just northwest of Ko Taen is the Mu Ko Ang Thong National Park.

== Population ==
Ko Taen is inhabited by about 20-30 people. Because of comings and goings of tourists, the population fluctuates constantly. In the 1960s there were about 500 persons living on the island. Because of higher wages on the neighbouring island of Ko Samui, most inhabitants emigrated there. This has led to the closure of the school and the health center on the island. Most houses and huts now remain empty. The longstanding and current (2014) deputy mayor of Samui, Suraphong Viriyanon (สุรพงษ์ วิริยานนท์), is a descendant of a Chinese Ko Taen family. He was a driving, but unsuccessful, force in the 1990s, to turn Ko Taen into an island only for eco-tourists.

== Tourism ==
Ko Taen is little frequented by tourists. The island is accessible only by boat. The usual way to Ko Taen is from the fishing village Thong Krut on the south coast of Samui, which faces Ko Taen. It is possible to arrange individual day-trips to Ko Taen there. There are also companies offering trips to the island from other places which include a much longer trip on larger and more comfortable boats. The island has several beaches suitable for snorkeling. The island is surrounded by coral reefs, which survived and partly recovered from the widespread dynamite fishing in the region until the 1980s. Many small bungalows have been built on To Taen, especially since in the late-1990s, of which some can still be rented by small groups, but many of these businesses have given up. There are paths that are interesting for mountain bikers. Ko Taen features a large mangrove forest on the southwest coast with abundant wildlife. Monitor lizards can be seen during a walk through Ko Taen quite often. There is still a small temple in Ko Taen with a freshwater spring on the beach.
