= Wat Sila Ngu =

Buddhist temple in Ko Samui

Coordinates: 9°27′04″N 100°01′51″E

Wat Sila Ngu (Thai: วัดศิลางู pronounced [wat̚˦˥ si˨˩.laː˧ ŋuː˧], literally meaning Stone Snake Temple) is a Buddhist temple in Ko Samui in Thailand. It is colloquially known as the Red Temple.

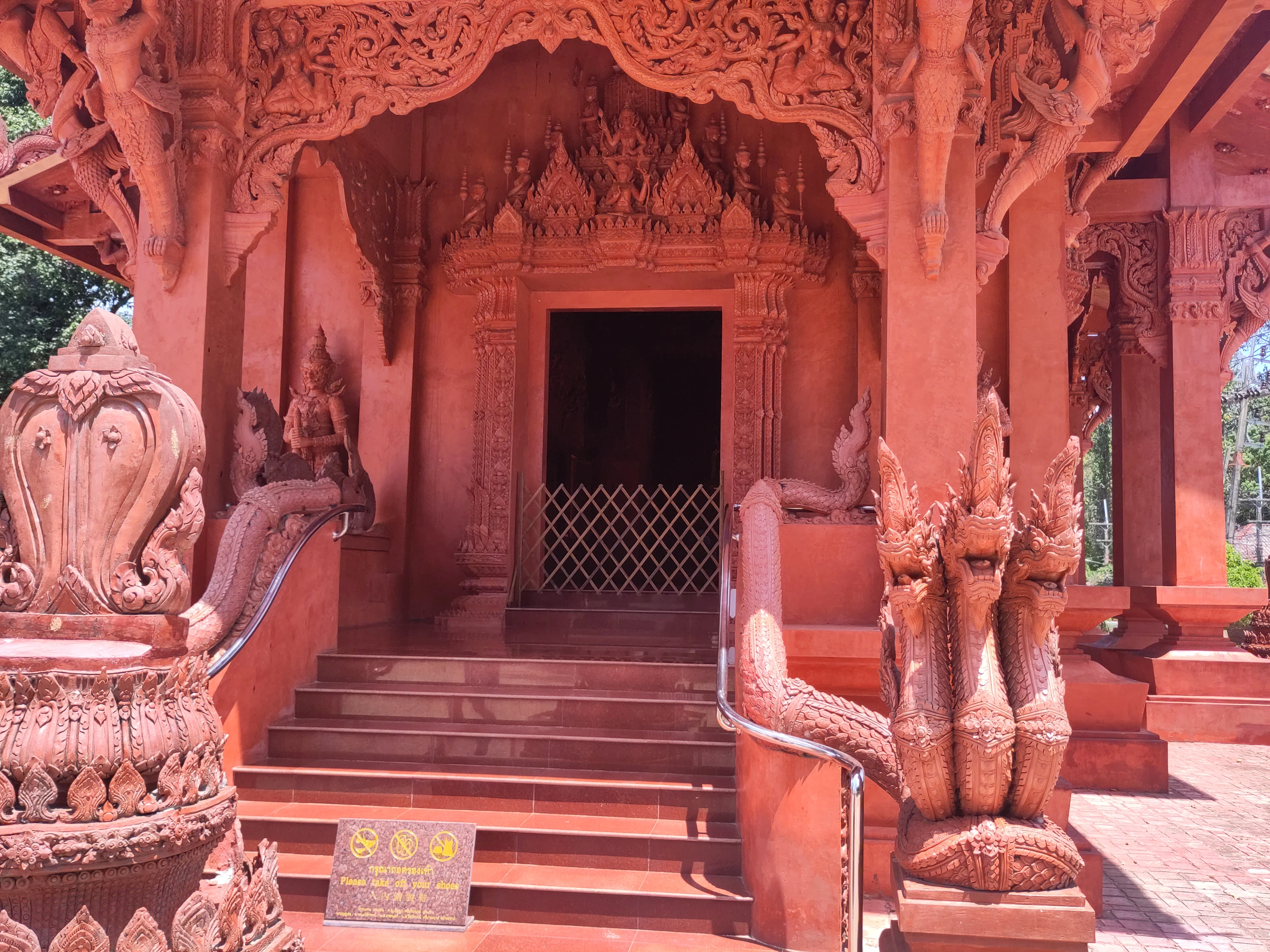
Entrance to the temple

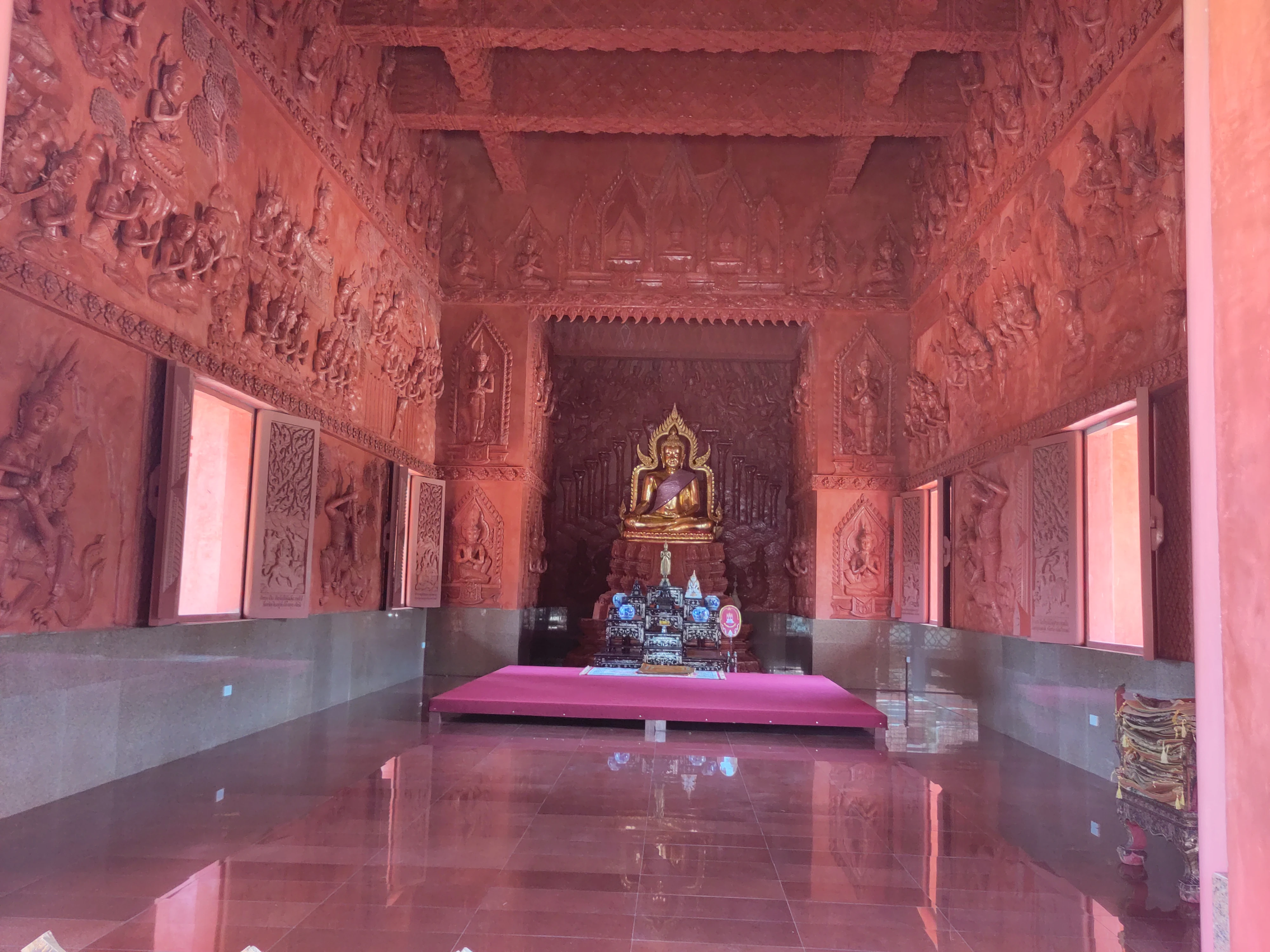
Interior of the temple
