= Thong Sala =

Town in Surat Thani province, Thailand

Coordinates: 9°42′39″N 99°59′13″E

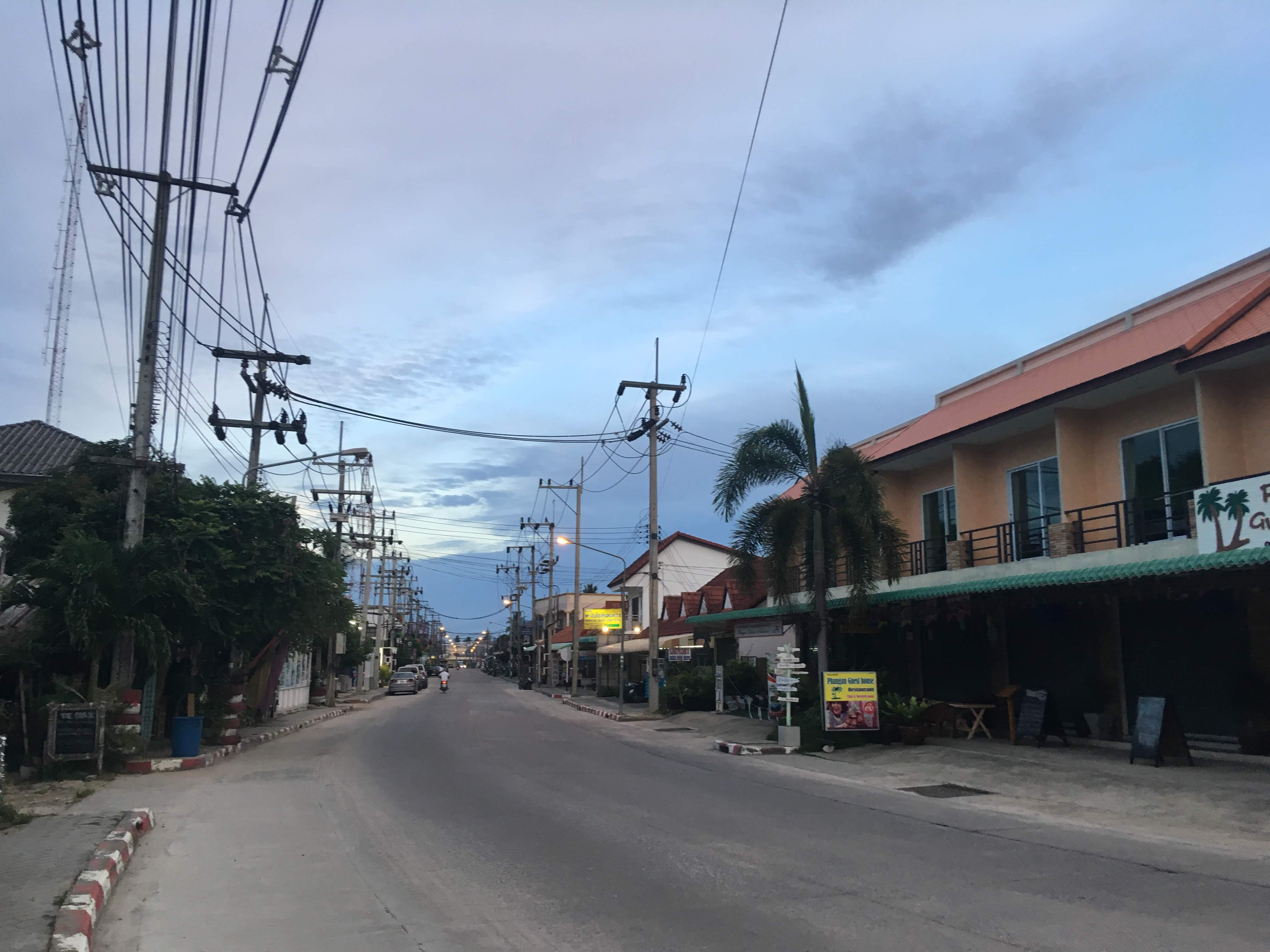
A road in Thong Sala.

Tong Sala (Thai: ท้องศาลา; RTGS: thong sala) is the principal town and administrative centre of Ko Pha Ngan, an island in the Gulf of Thailand. While Haad Rin hosts the Full Moon Party and attracts many of the island's visitors, Thong Sala is mostly used by tourists as a ferry terminal and jumping off point.

The port area has three main piers, one of which is able to handle medium- to large-sized container and passenger craft. The others accommodate smaller passenger and dive boats that serve the islands of Ko Pha Ngan, Ko Samui, Ko Tao, and the mainland ports of Surat Thani and Chumphon.
