= Ko Phaluai =

Island in the Mu Ko Ang Thong island group of Thailand

Coordinates: 9°31′40″N 99°41′04″E

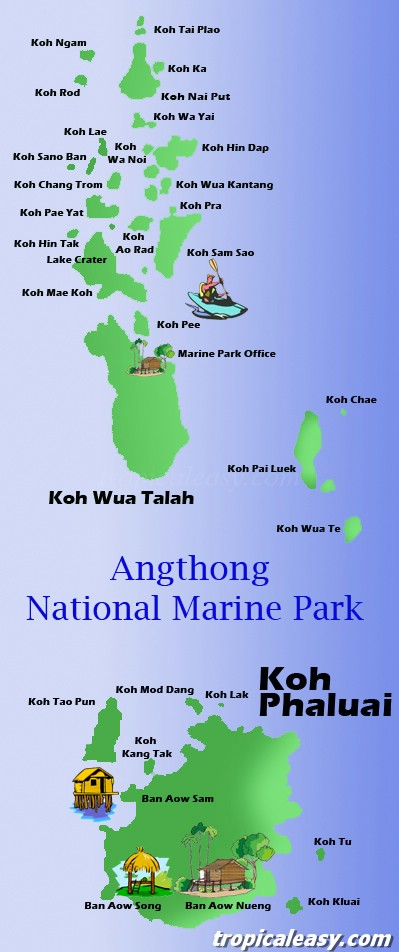
Map of Northern Mu Ko Ang Thong

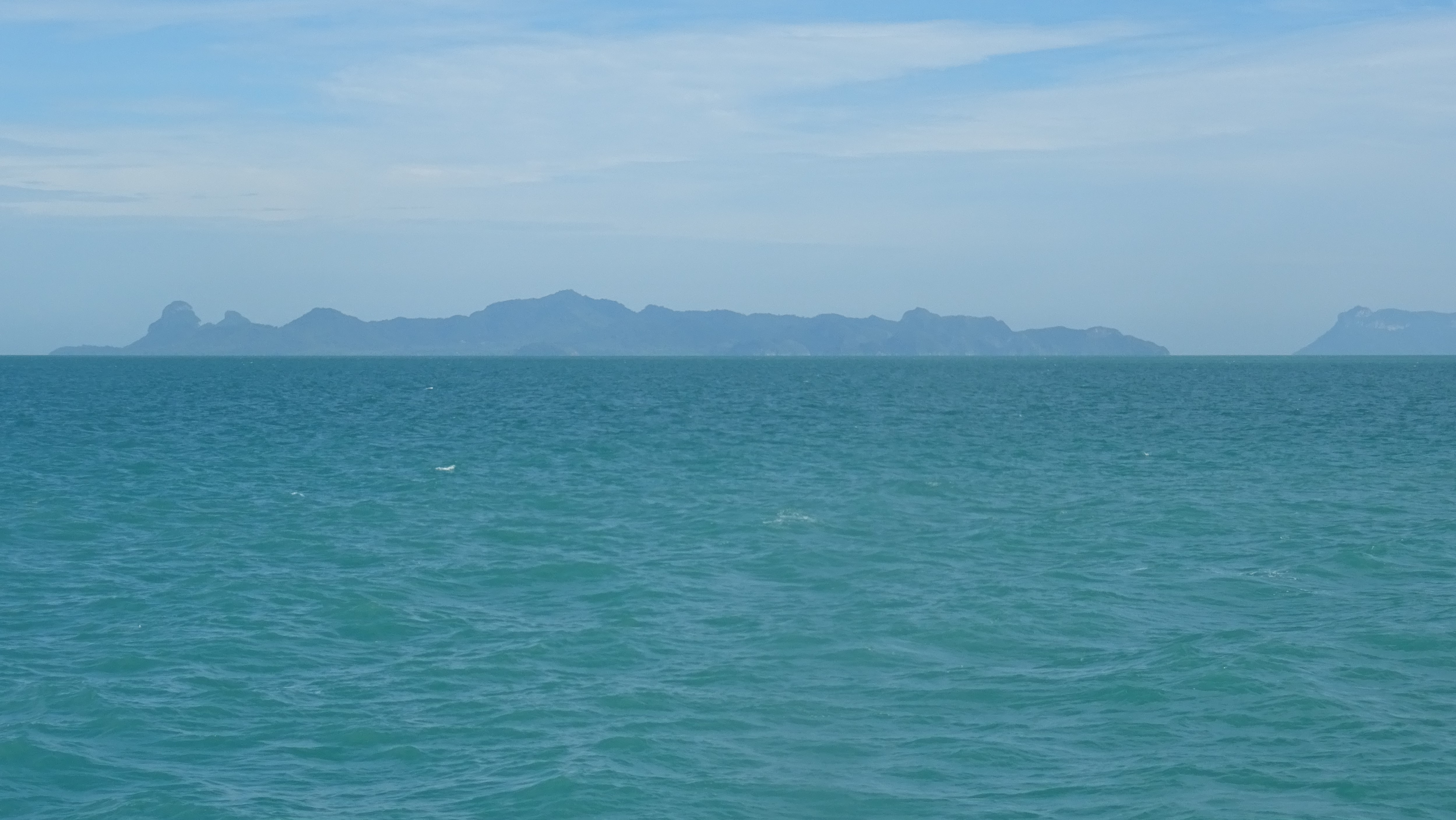
View of Ko Phaluai.

Ko Phaluai (Thai: เกาะพะลวย, pronounced [kɔ̀ʔ pʰā.lūa̯j]; also spelled Koh Phaluai or Koh Paluay) is the biggest island in the Mu Ko Ang Thong island group. It is inhabited by sailors who still earn a living from fishing.

== Details ==
It is where the capital village of the island chain (Ban Ao Sam) lies. The Islands size is 19.1 km^{2} and has a population of 500. Together with a small portion of land on Ko Samui Island where the town of Bang Makham lies, The Mu Ko Ang Thong islands are part of Ang Thong Subdistrict of Ko Samui District, Surat Thani.

== Tourism ==
The island is still very new to tourism. There are a few home stays and resorts. One of the most famous resort is Angthong Beach Resort.

== Ecology and environment ==
Ko Phaluai lies within Mu Ko Ang Thong National Park, a marine protected area comprising 42 islands in the Gulf of Thailand. The marine ecosystems around the islands include coral reef, seagrass bed, mangrove forest, and beach forest habitats. Extensive surveys at reef flats and slopes within Mu Ko Ang Thong have recorded juvenile corals at densities up to 26.05 individuals per sqm, indicating active coral recruitment and the park’s role as a natural coral nursery. Because of the biodiversity and ongoing coral recruitment, the waters around Ko Phaluai and the wider Mu Ko Ang Thong archipelago play an important role in coral reef conservation and in sustaining reef associated marine species.

== Table of Islands ==
Nr	Island	Capital	Other Cities	Area (km^{2})	Population (Note: The Islands area and population data retrieved from the 2012 census)
1	Ko Chueak	Ko Chueak		1.62	0
2	Ko Nok Taphao	Ko Nok Taphao	Ao Kruat, Ao Pla, Ao Uttra,	3.32	200
3	Ko Phaluai	Ban Ao Sam	Ban Ao song, Ban Ao Nueng, Ao nathap, Ao luek	19.1	500
4	Ko Raet	Ko Raet		0.07	50
5	Ko Sam Sao	Ko Sam Sao		0.85	0
6	Ko Wua Chio	Ko Wua Chio		0.26	2
7	Ko Wua Talap	Ang Thong Station	Ao Phi	6.06	10
8	More Islands			10	0
Total:	Mu Ko Ang Thong	Ban Ao Sam	Ko Nok Taphao	40	692

== See also ==
- List of islands of Thailand
- Gulf of Thailand
- Surat Thani
- Outline of Thailand
- List of cities in Thailand
- Mu Ko Samui
