= Hua Thanon, Ko Samui =

Coordinates: 9°26′30″N 100°01′19″E

Hua Thanon หัวถนน
- Muban
- Interactive map of Hua Thanon
- Country: Thailand
- Province: Surat Thani
- Tambon: Maret
- Website: kohsamuicity.go.th/travel/detail/1372

Hua Thanon (Thai: หัวถนน) is a village on the southwestern coast of Ko Samui, Thailand. Predominantly a Muslim fishing village, Hua Thanon provides much of the island with its seafood. The village is known its seafood market, Hua Thanon Fish Market.

The village hosts Koh Samui Central Mosque, also known as Masjid Nurul Ihsan (Thai: มัสยิดนูรุ้ลเอียะห์ซาน), built in 1984 in the Neo-Mughal style.
