= Siamese rock gecko =

Scientific classification
- Kingdom: Animalia
- Phylum: Chordata
- Class: Reptilia
- Order: Squamata
- Suborder: Gekkota
- Family: Gekkonidae
- Genus: Cnemaspis
- Species: C. siamensis

Binomial name
- Cnemaspis siamensis (Smith 1925)

Synonyms
- Gonatodes siamensis Smith 1925; Cnemaspis (cnemaspis) siamensis (Smith 1925); Gonatodes kendalli Smith 1916

Species of lizard

The Siamese rock gecko (Cnemaspis siamensis) is a species of geckos. It is endemic to Thailand. No subspecies are listed.
