= Ko Samui =

Island in Thailand

Ko Samui เกาะสมุย Koh Samui Samui
- Island; City Municipality
- City of Koh Samui เทศบาลนครเกาะสมุย
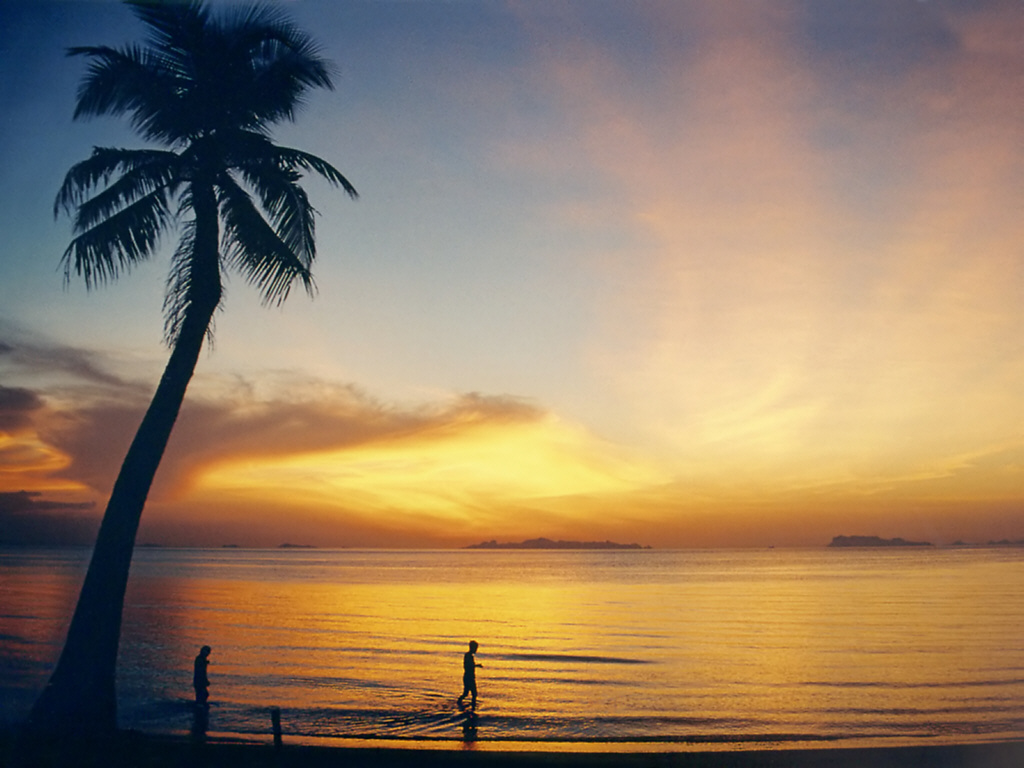
- Lipa Noi Beach

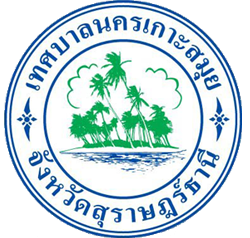
- Seal

- Location within Thailand
- Coordinates: 9°30′N 100°00′E
- Country: Thailand
- Province: Surat Thani

Government
  - Mayor: Ramnet Jaikwang
  - Vice Mayor: Muensilp Poolsawat

Area
  - Total: 228.7 km^{2} (88.3 sq mi)
- Highest elevation: 635 m (2,083 ft)
- Lowest elevation: 0 m (0 ft)

Population (2019)
  - Total: 70,059
  - Density: 306.3/km^{2} (793.4/sq mi)
- Time zone: UTC+7 (ICT)
- Area code: (+66) 77
- Website: kohsamuicity.go.th

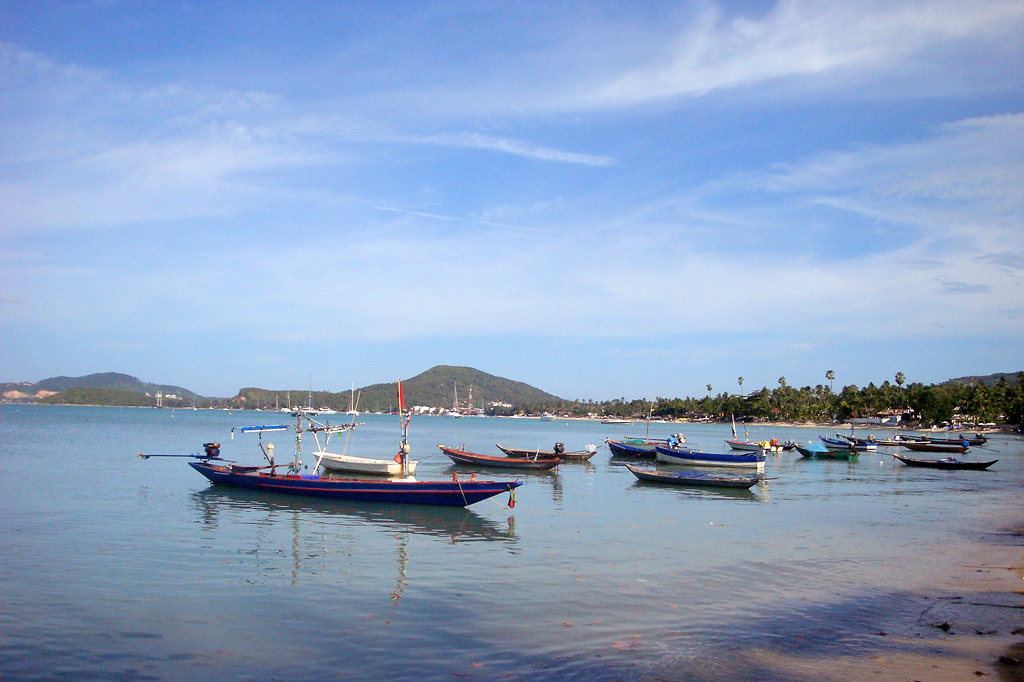
Bo Phut Beach

Ko Samui or Koh Samui (Thai: เกาะสมุย, pronounced [kɔ̀ʔ sāmǔj]), often locally shortened to Samui, is an island off the east coast of Thailand. Geographically in the Chumphon Archipelago, it is part of Surat Thani Province, though as of 2012, Ko Samui was granted municipal status and thus is now locally self-governing. Ko Samui, with an area of 228.7 square kilometres (88.3 sq mi), is Thailand's second largest island after Phuket. In 2018, it was visited by 2.7 million tourists.

== History ==
=== Early Period ===
According to oral tradition, the island of Ko Samui was first settled around the 6th century CE by fishermen from the Malay Peninsula and visited by passing traders from southern China. It has also been claimed by some local historians that the island was used as a safe haven during storm seasons. However, recent archaeological evidence suggests that Ko Samui may have been inhabited significantly earlier, more than 2,000 years ago, with bronze ritual drums with etchings of birds, boats, and spirits being found in the southern hills on the island.

Beginning in the thirteenth century, Ko Samui was part of Siam's feudal system and at the time the island acted as a crucial intermediary for ongoing trade between China and India. As a result of its position in Southeast Asia, the island began receiving immigrants from many ethnic and religious groups. At the time, Ko Samui was connected to the muang system through Nakorn Si Thammarat and Thai people constituted the ethnic majority, moving the island to a more agrarian society. These individuals tended to live further inland than previous inhabitants.

Ko Samui appears on Chinese maps dating back to 1687, under the name Pulo Cornam.

=== Colonial Period ===
Beginning in the 19th century, a significant number of Chinese immigrants moved to many areas in Thailand, including Ko Samui. Most of these individuals were traders moving from Hainan, who culturally assimilated into the majority Thai society on the island. While much of these individuals' Chinese culture and identity have not been preserved, a number of Hainanese temples and communities still exist on Ko Samui. It was these immigrants who first began cotton and coconut plantations on the island, transporting them to the mainland on boats known as panuk lang si. As a result, these Thai-Chinese individuals tended to live closer to the beaches of Ko Samui, in contrast to the ethnic Thai individuals who lived further inland.

During World War II, Ko Samui was used by Japan as a base of operations in conjunction with Thailand's Navy. It is believed that, as a result of conflicts between the Allies and Japan, the area around the island contains a number of shipwrecks from the era. Locals reported a large explosion around that time, which academic Paul Chambers attributed to a Japanese tanker being bombed alongside Ko Samui on 15 June 1945.

In the 1960s, two dengue hemorrhagic fever (DHF) epidemics occurred on Ko Samui.

=== Tourism Period ===
Until the late 20th century, Ko Samui was an isolated self-sufficient community, having little connection with the mainland of Thailand. The island was without roads until the early 1970s and the 15 kilometres (9.3 mi) journey from one side of the island to the other could involve a whole-day trek through the mountainous central jungles.

At first, tourists were primarily backpackers to whom locals provided basic accommodations. However, as Bangkok, Pattaya, and Phuket started to become major tourist destinations in the 1980s, Ko Samui began to attract significant foreign investment and travelers. The first era of development projects began at Chaweng Beach, followed by a steady outgrowth of resorts across the rest of the island. This period of economic growth was primarily the result of Thailand's Fifth National Economic and Social Development Plan, which lasted from 1982 until 1986. In 1985, the Tourism Authority of Thailand (TAT) launched the Master Plan for Tourism Development of Ko Samui/Surat Thani.

In 1989, Samui Airport was constructed, facilitating a spike in mass tourism growth on the island during the 1990s. As a result of the increased income from tourism, Thailand's central government began reorganizing local administrative procedures on the island. Leases and joint ventures also came to replace direct land sales during this period, especially as the devaluation of the Thai baht and political instability in Indonesia led many to view Ko Samui as an affordable and relatively safe alternative destination. DHF outbreaks continued to occur on the island following the 1960 epidemics, with an incidence of nearly 500 cases per 100,000 during one outbreak in 1995, potentially impacting tourism during the period.

Economic growth has brought not only prosperity but also major changes to the island's environment and culture, including "explosive tensions" between rich and poor residents and crime linked to that or otherwise.

On 11 April 2015, a car bomb packed inside a pickup truck stolen from the southern border province of Yala, exploded in the underground car park of the Central Festival Samui shopping mall. The blast injured seven people, six Thai nationals and a 12-year-old Italian girl, who sustained minor injuries and were quickly treated and discharged. Because the vehicle originated from Yala, one of Thailand's southernmost, Muslim-majority provinces affected by the Southern Thailand insurgency, authorities initially suspected a connection to southern militant networks. Government and military officials also investigated potential links to domestic political tensions and anti-coup elements.

On 4 March 2022, Australian cricketer Shane Warne died of a heart attack at the age of 52, while on holiday in Ko Samui.

== Name ==
The origin of the name samui is unknown. It may come from the Sanskrit-Tamil word สมวย, meaning 'sea weather'. Or it may derive from the name of a tree known locally in southern Thailand as ต้นหมุย (full name ต้นสมุย). A third possibility is that it originated from early Hainanese traders to Samui. In Hainanese Chinese, เซ่าบ่วย means 'first island', 'barrier', or 'gate', or literally 'beautiful beach'. As it was their first port of call in Thailand, it became its name and evolved to สมุย. Some people believe that the word "samui" derives from the Malay word saboey, or 'safe haven'. There is no firm corroboration of any of these theories. Ko เกาะ is the Thai word for "island".

[Note on pronunciation: When English-speaking people read or say it to each other, "Ko" rhymes with "hoe". In Thai, เกาะ is always pronounced "ghott".]

== Government ==
The first local government on Samui island was established in 1956 with the sanitary district Ko Samui, which however only covered the area around the settlement. In 1963 it was enlarged to cover the entirety of Samui and Pha-Ngan islands, which at that time were still in the same district. In 1973, the area of the Ko Pha-Ngan District became a separate sanitary district. Since 1981, the sanitary district covers the area of the whole district.

Like all sanitary districts, Ko Samui became a subdistrict municipality (thesaban tambon) in 1999. The subdistrict municipality was upgraded to a town municipality (thesaban mueang) in 2008, and to a city municipality in 2012.

The conversion of the municipality into a special administrative area with greater powers of self-governance similar to Pattaya has been discussed since 2008, but as of 2018, no action has been taken.

=== Administration ===
Ko Samui is an amphoe (district) of Surat Thani Province, divided into seven sub-districts (tambons) and 39 administrative villages (mubans). The entire island is one city municipality (thesaban nakhon). The district covers the island, as well as the Ang Thong archipelago and some other small islands nearby.

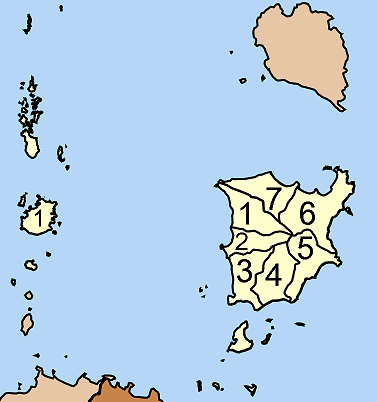
Map of Tambon

No.	Name	Thai	Villages	Pop.
1.	Ang Thong	อ่างทอง	6	13,043
2.	Lipa Noi	ลิปะน้อย	5	5,432
3.	Taling Ngam	ตลิ่งงาม	5	6,138
4.	Na Mueang	หน้าเมือง	5	5,339
5.	Maret	มะเร็ต	6	9,051
6.	Bo Phut	บ่อผุด	6	19,014
7.	Mae Nam	แม่น้ำ	6	9,248

Originally, the district included all of the islands of Surat Thani Province. The islands Ko Pha-ngan and Ko Tao were split off as the minor district (king amphoe) Ko Pha-ngan effective 1 October 1970. In 1980, administrative village number seven of Ang Thong Sub-district covering the islands Ko Chueak, Ko Nok Phao, and Ko Rikan was reassigned to Don Sak District, where it now forms village number 11.

== Geography ==
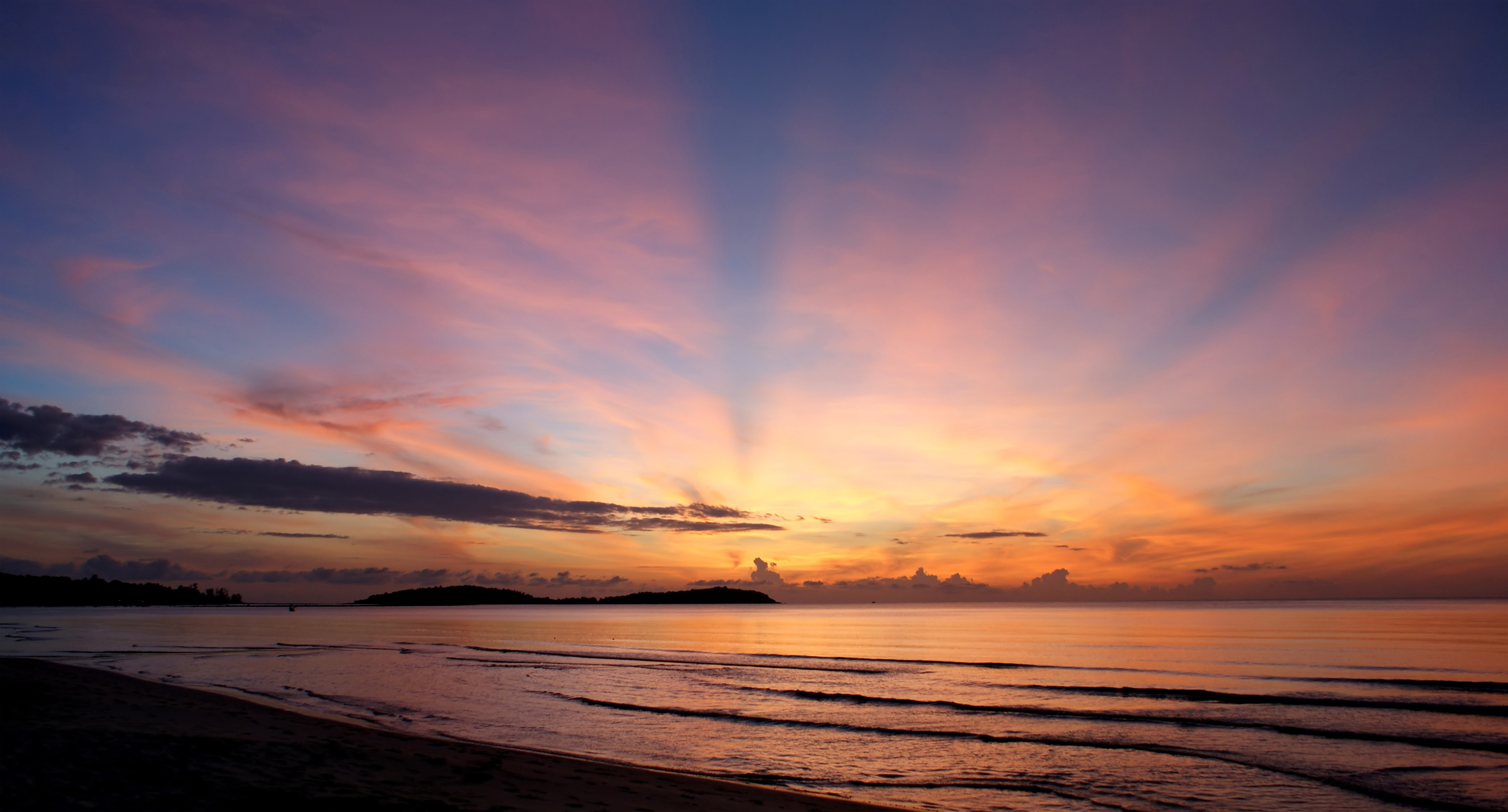
Sunrise, Ko Samui

Ko Samui is in the Gulf of Thailand, about 35 km (22 mi) northeast of Surat Thani town (9°N, 100°E). It is the largest island in the Chumphon Archipelago, measuring about 25 kilometres (16 mi) at its widest point. To the north are the populated resort islands of Ko Pha-ngan, Ko Tao, and Ko Nang Yuan. Close to Bangrak in northeast Samui is the small uninhabited island of Ko Som, and to the northeast of Chaweng is the tiny Ko Matlang. To the south are Ko Taen and Ko Matsum, each of which have small tourist facilities. To the far west are 44 other islands which together compose Mu Ko Ang Thong National Park which is accessible by a day-trip boat tour from Ko Samui.

The central part of Ko Samui is mostly tropical jungle with tree coverage and wildlife and its largest mountain, Khao Pom, peaking at 635 m (2,083 ft). The lowland and coastal areas are connected by a 51 km (32 mi)-long road, encircling the island. Other concrete roads branch off to service other areas.

The town of Nathon on the west coast is the closest town to the mainland and is the original capital which still houses many government offices. Two of the island's five main piers make Nathon the main port for all transportation from the mainland and the commercial centre for Samui residents. The transition from dependence on the local coconut industry and the continued growth and development of the tourist industry, as well as the northeastern location of the airport, has led to the increase of commercial activity in Chaweng and Bophut.

=== Climate ===
Ko Samui has a tropical monsoon climate according to the Köppen climate classification, based on an analysis of 1971–2010 Thai Meteorological Department data. The climate is warm and humid for most of the year. In comparison to Phuket and most of the rest of southern Thailand, Samui's weather is relatively drier (Samui receives about 1,960 mm (77.2 in) rain per year, and Phuket gets 2,220 mm (87 in)). Phuket's wet season is spread over six to eight months. Ko Samui has only two months with more than 212 mm (8 in) of rain. The heaviest precipitation typically falls in the time frame from mid October to early December. For the rest of the year, given the tropical climate, rain showers are brief; 20–60 minutes duration is typical.

Climate data for Ko Samui (1991–2020, extremes 1968-present)
Month	Jan	Feb	Mar	Apr	May	Jun	Jul	Aug	Sep	Oct	Nov	Dec	Year
Record high °C (°F)	33.4 (92.1)	35.1 (95.2)	36.0 (96.8)	38.0 (100.4)	37.8 (100.0)	38.2 (100.8)	37.7 (99.9)	37.2 (99.0)	36.4 (97.5)	35.8 (96.4)	34.0 (93.2)	32.3 (90.1)	38.2 (100.8)
Mean daily maximum °C (°F)	29.0 (84.2)	29.4 (84.9)	30.4 (86.7)	31.8 (89.2)	32.9 (91.2)	32.7 (90.9)	32.3 (90.1)	32.4 (90.3)	31.9 (89.4)	30.6 (87.1)	29.7 (85.5)	29.3 (84.7)	31.0 (87.9)
Daily mean °C (°F)	26.9 (80.4)	27.4 (81.3)	28.2 (82.8)	29.1 (84.4)	29.2 (84.6)	28.8 (83.8)	28.5 (83.3)	28.4 (83.1)	28.0 (82.4)	27.4 (81.3)	27.1 (80.8)	26.8 (80.2)	28.0 (82.4)
Mean daily minimum °C (°F)	24.2 (75.6)	24.9 (76.8)	25.4 (77.7)	26.0 (78.8)	25.7 (78.3)	25.3 (77.5)	25.1 (77.2)	25.1 (77.2)	24.8 (76.6)	24.3 (75.7)	24.1 (75.4)	24.0 (75.2)	24.9 (76.8)
Record low °C (°F)	18.6 (65.5)	17.8 (64.0)	21.0 (69.8)	22.0 (71.6)	22.1 (71.8)	20.6 (69.1)	19.9 (67.8)	21.7 (71.1)	19.4 (66.9)	21.4 (70.5)	19.6 (67.3)	18.8 (65.8)	17.8 (64.0)
Average precipitation mm (inches)	126.8 (4.99)	64.3 (2.53)	115.8 (4.56)	82.9 (3.26)	131.6 (5.18)	133.6 (5.26)	117.0 (4.61)	102.2 (4.02)	117.5 (4.63)	294.9 (11.61)	444.6 (17.50)	263.1 (10.36)	1,994.3 (78.52)
Average precipitation days (≥ 1.0 mm)	8.5	4.3	4.7	6.1	11.0	10.3	10.7	10.5	10.6	15.8	16.5	11.6	120.6
Average relative humidity (%)	82.7	81.2	81.0	80.7	79.7	78.1	78.3	78.0	80.0	84.7	85.5	82.6	81.0
Average dew point °C (°F)	23.6 (74.5)	23.8 (74.8)	24.6 (76.3)	25.3 (77.5)	25.1 (77.2)	24.4 (75.9)	24.2 (75.6)	24.0 (75.2)	24.1 (75.4)	24.4 (75.9)	24.3 (75.7)	23.4 (74.1)	24.3 (75.7)
Mean monthly sunshine hours	198.4	214.7	238.7	201.0	192.2	150.0	155.0	151.9	144.0	145.7	174.0	176.7	2,142.3
Mean daily sunshine hours	6.4	7.6	7.7	6.7	6.2	5.0	5.0	4.9	4.8	4.7	5.8	5.7	5.9
Source 1: World Meteorological Organization, Meteomanz (record)
Source 2: Office of Water Management and Hydrology, Royal Irrigation Department (sun 1981–2010)(extremes)

=== Nature ===
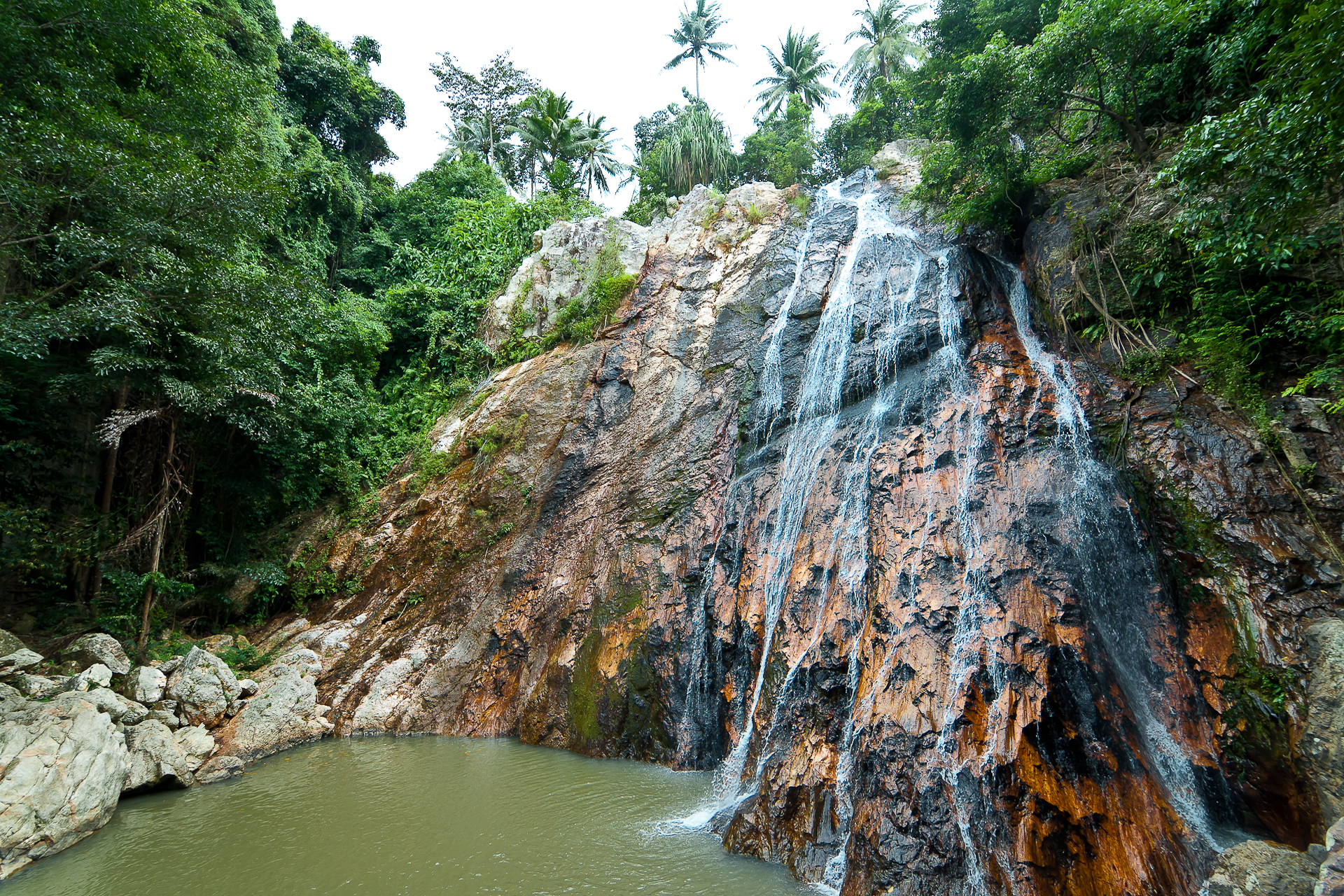
One of the two Na Muang waterfalls

The jungles of Ko Samui are home to a number of notable waterfalls, including the Na Muang Waterfalls, the Hin Lad Waterfall, the Khun Si Waterfall, the Wang Sao Thong Waterfall, the Tang Rua Waterfall, the Tar Nim Waterfall, and the Lat Wanorn Waterfall. Many of these waterfalls are especially popular tourist destinations, despite a number of visitors experiencing severe injuries or death due to slips or falls around these areas.

A number of fruit trees grow on the island, including langsat, durian, mamud, and mamuang thaai tor (the latter two of which are local mango varieties).

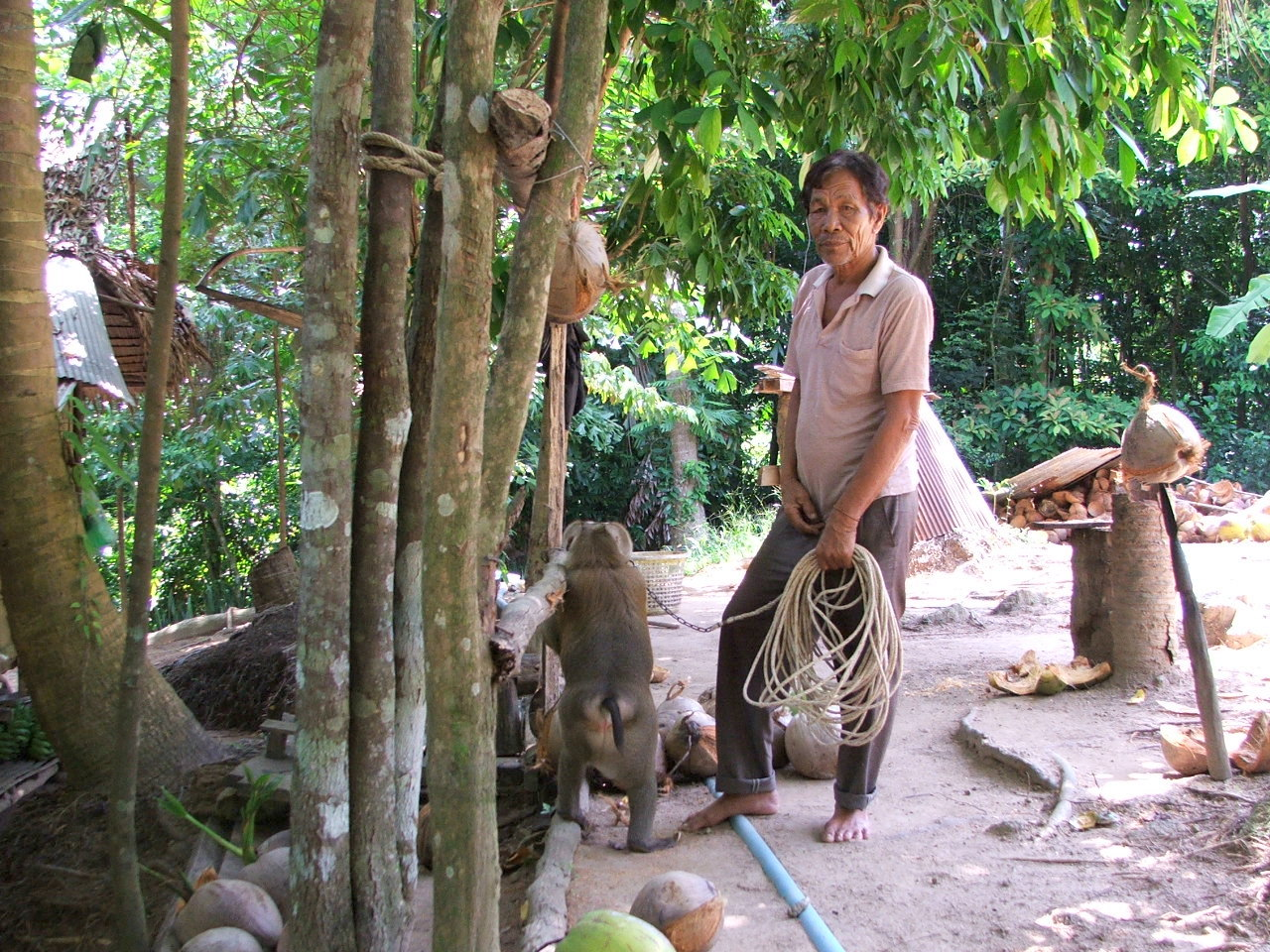
A monkey collecting a coconut

Several mammal species have been noted on the island, including the peninsular shrew, the crab-eating macaque, the common treeshrew, the small flying fox, the lesser short-nosed fruit bat, the cave nectar bat, the long-tongued nectar bat, the Black giant squirrel, the grey-bellied squirrel, the black rat, the Sikkim rat, the ricefield rat, the Polynesian rat, the brown rat, the white-bellied rat, the red spiny rat, and the Asian palm civet. Stray dogs are common on Ko Samui, with tens of thousands being reported; before 1999, no organizations dedicated to spaying or neutering dogs were established, leading to the dog population of the island growing unchecked. Macaques are forced by some farmers on the island to harvest coconuts, often under threat of violence. Many elephant sanctuaries exist on Ko Samui, but there are no standards for what constitutes a sanctuary in Thailand and unethical and unsafe practices such as elephant riding still occur. In one case in 2016, a British tourist was killed after being thrown from an elephant after its handler hit the animal several times.

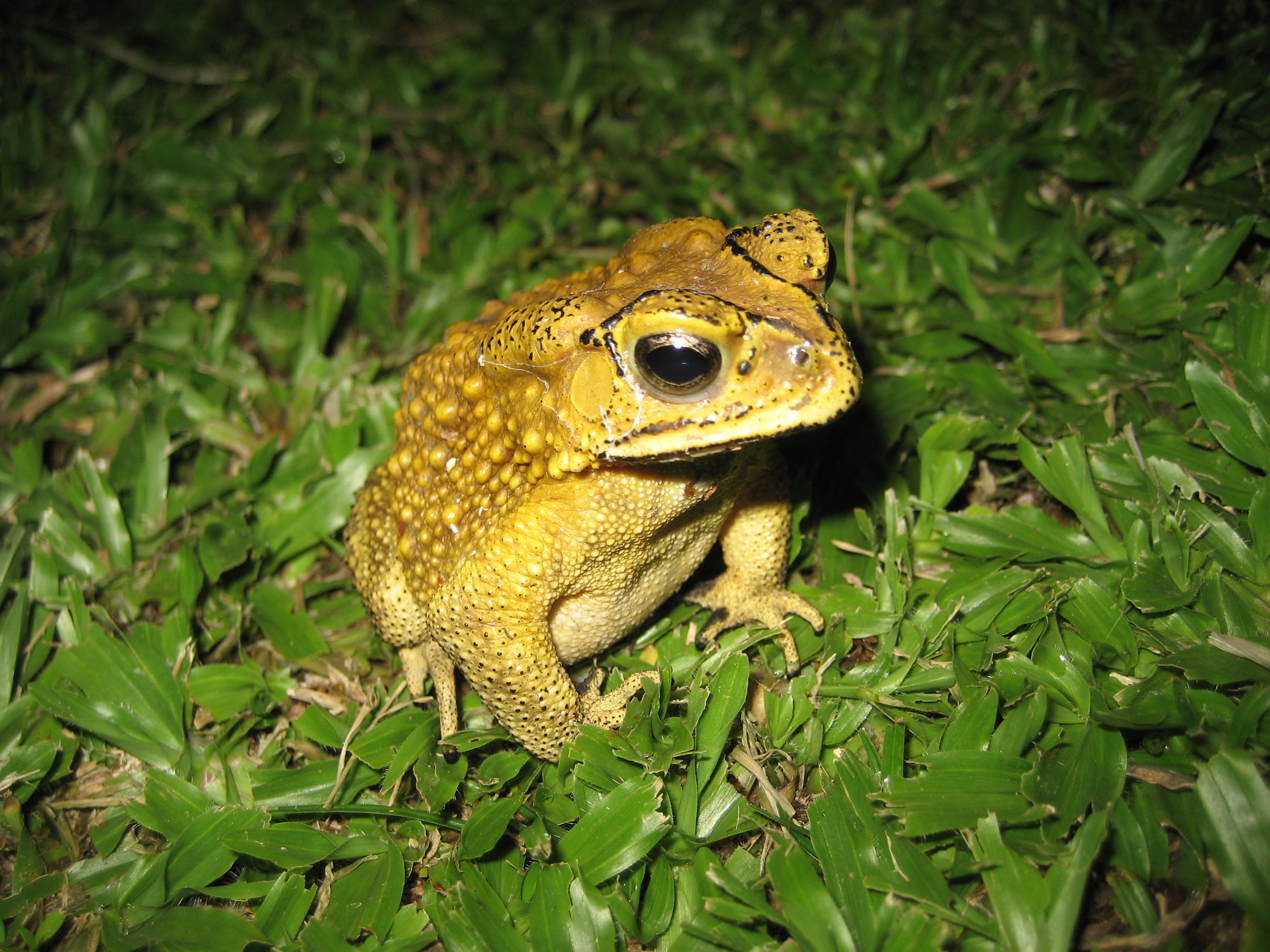
One of many species of frogs found on Ko Samui

Amphibian species include the frogs Limnonectes blythii, Limnonectes doriae, Limnonectes pseudodoriae, Polypedates leucomystax, Microhyla ornata and Sylvirana nigrovittata and the caecilian Ichthyophis supachaii. Reptile species include the rock geckoes Cnemaspis samui and Cnemaspis siamensis, the frilly geckoes Cosymbotus craspedotus and Hemidactylus platyurus, the Malayan forest gecko Cyrtodactylus pulchellus, the common four-clawed gecko Gehyra mutilata, the Indo-Pacific gecko Hemidactylus garnotii, the Asian slender gecko Hemiphyllodactylus yunnanensis, the garden lizards Calotes emma and Calotes versicolor, the spotted flying dragon Draco maculatus, the skinks Dasia olivacea, Eutropis multifasciata, and Subdoluseps bowringii, and the snakes Ahaetulla prasina, Argyrophis diardii, Boiga cynodon, Cylindrophis ruffus, Homalopsis buccata, Python reticulatus, and Xenopeltis unicolor.

Mosquito species Aedes albopictus and Aedes aegypti were the vectors for two epidemics of dengue hemorrhagic fever (DHF) on Ko Samui in 1966 and 1967.

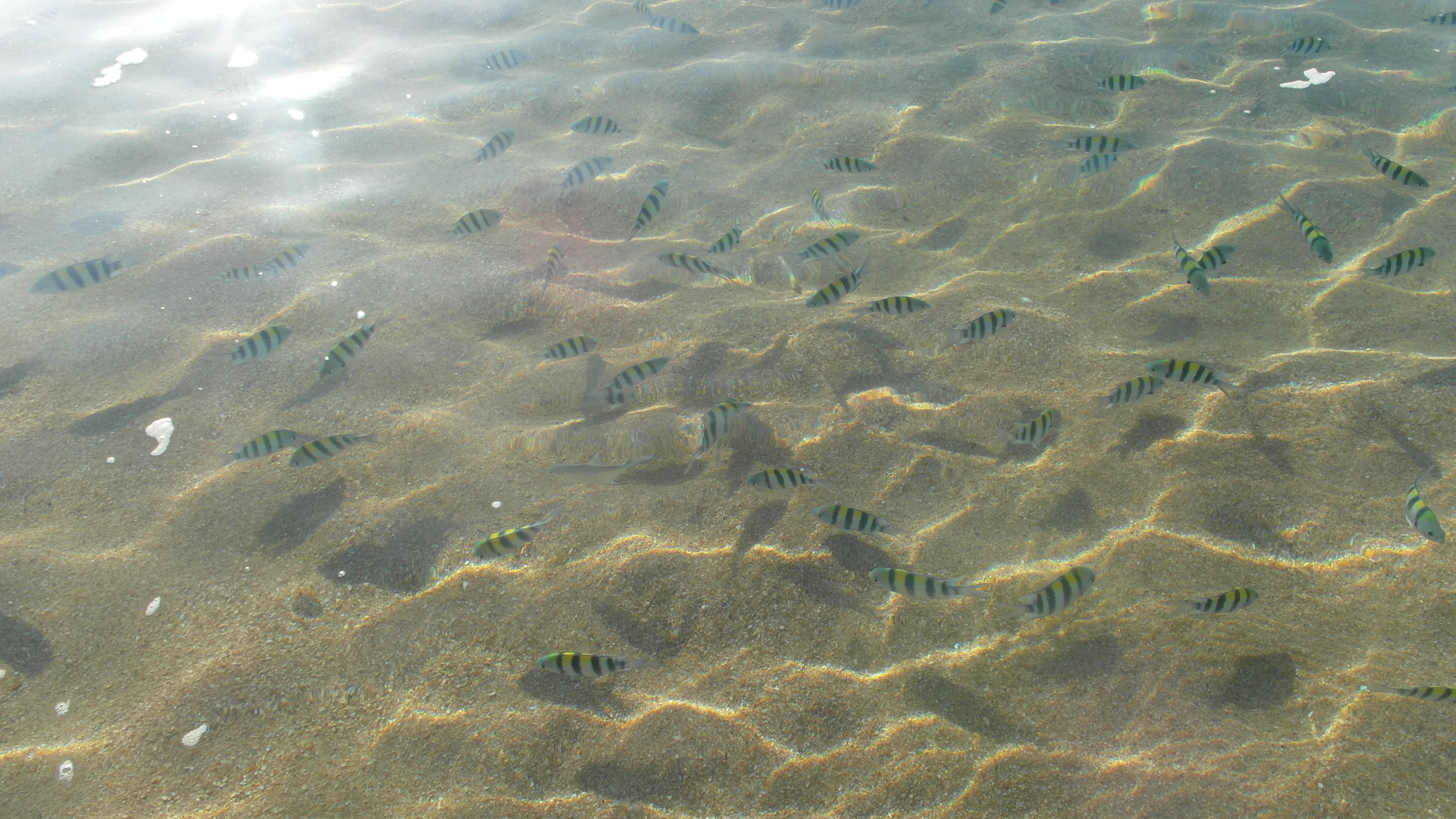
Fish found on the beach of Chaweng Noi

Sea life around Ko Samui is diverse, including many species such as reef squid, sand whiting (known locally as pla sai), flying fish, whale sharks, and box jellyfish. It has been noted that the highest incidence of jellyfish-related deaths in Thailand have occurred on Ko Samui and Ko Pha-ngan, with six of the seven cases of box jellyfish-related deaths from 1999 to 2015 occurring on those two islands.

== Demography ==
In 1913, around 8,000 people lived on the island of Ko Samui, increasing to around 30,000 people by 1970. By 1993, according to the City Council of Ko Samui, the island had a local population of 31,643 and a non-local population of around 15,000 (including tourists and migrant workers). By 2007, the local population had grown to 51,117 and the non-local population was estimated to be between 100,000 and 150,000 people. In 2023, it was estimated that the local population of Ko Samui was around 70,000 with more than 200,000 coming to the island for work.

In 2001, the local population included 16,192 households, mostly practicing Buddhists with a minority population of Thai Muslims. Buddhist temples are scattered across the island, including Wat Samret, Wat Khunaram, Wat Laem Sor, Wat Khiri Wongkaram, Wat Sila Ngu, and Wat Phra Yai. Wam Samret is among the oldest of the temples on the island, being more than 200 years old, and Wat Khuaram holds the preserved body of Luang Pho Daeng. Less formalized religious practices are common across Ko Samui, such as the Loy Khro ritual practiced in Baan Tai, the tradition of Gin Hor, and the rite of Lah Pho Ta.

The Muslim community of Ko Samui has historically and contemporarily been focused on the village of Ban Hua Thanon, Tambon Maret.

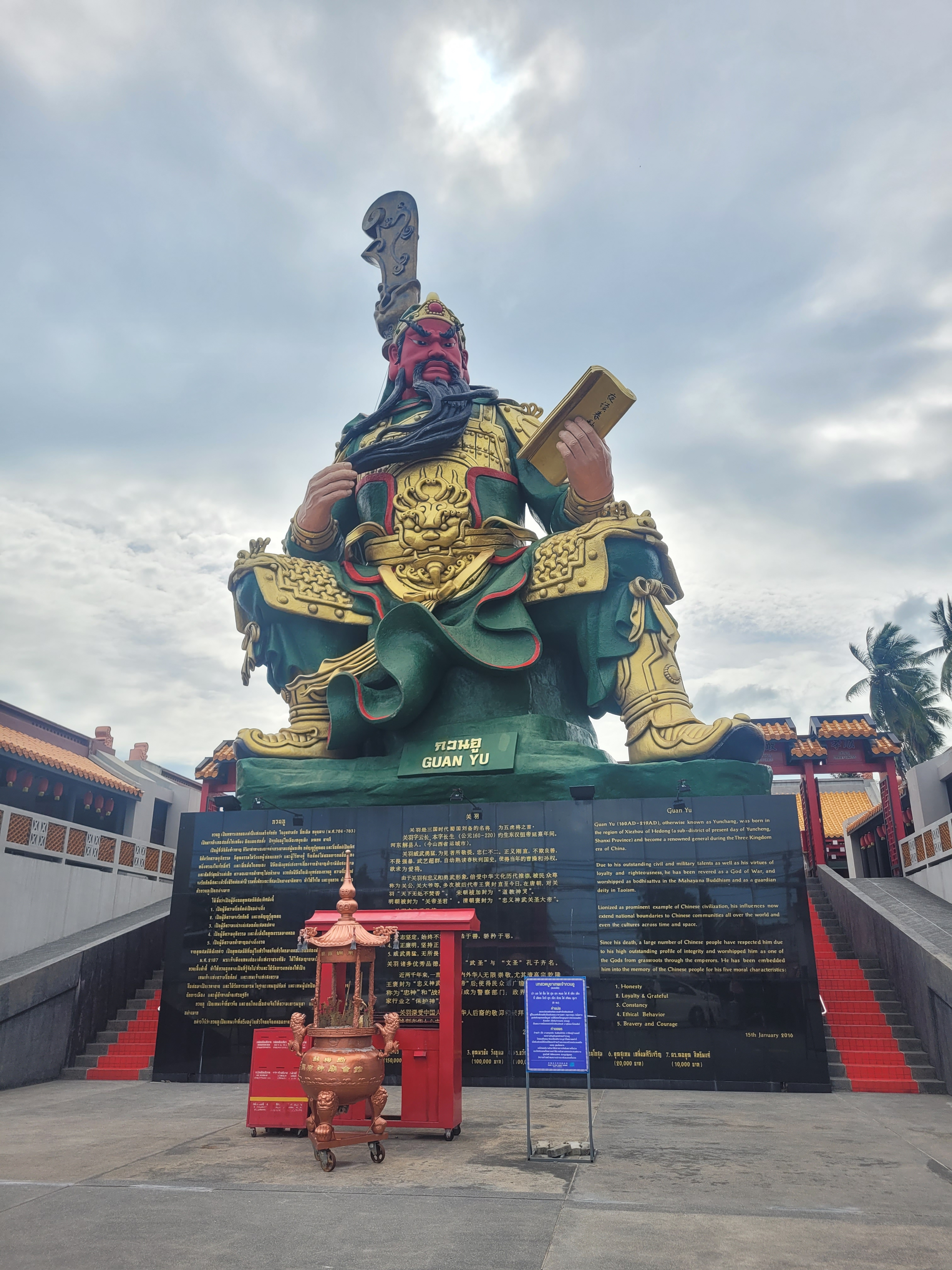
Guan Yu statue at Guan Yu Koh Samui Shrine

A small Thai Chinese population has also been reported, with the tallest statue of Guan Yu in Thailand appearing in Hua Thanon, one of the oldest Chinese-Hainanese settlements on Ko Samui.

== Economy ==
Ko Samui's economy now is based primarily on a successful tourist industry, as well as exports of coconut and rubber.

== Tourism ==
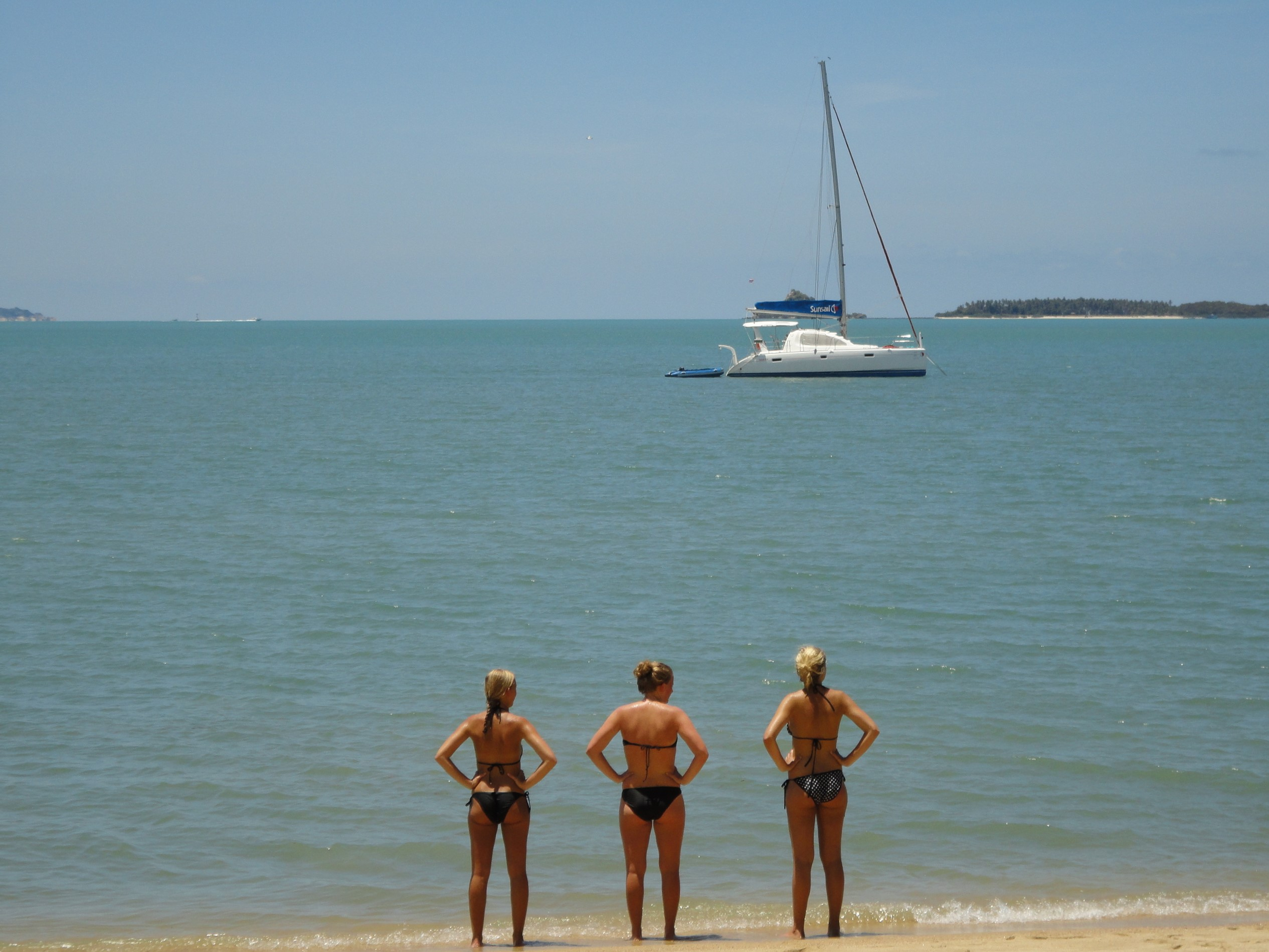
Tourists on Bo Phut beach

Sociologist Erik Cohen noted that modern tourism to Ko Samui began to pick up pace in the late 1970s. The expansion of tourism on the island has resulted in growth of building resorts, bungalows, and luxury private villas on the island. The island's total of 17,479 hotel rooms in 2013 was increased by an additional 459 new rooms in 2015. A gradual shift in demand is seeing more Asian visitors and families, but the top three source markets have been Germany, the UK, and Thailand, which contribute a combined 27 percent share. Bangkok Airways continues to modernize its fleet with new Airbuses, phasing out older ATR 72 propeller planes, which will provide 189,000 additional airline seats for Samui travelers. The airport has already increased the number of daily flights from 36 to 50.

The island received more than 2.5 million foreign visitors in 2017, up from 2.34 million in 2016. According to a luxury hotelier, tourists traveling to Ko Samui spend an average of 7,700 to 8,200 baht per head per day. It is a well-known destination for scuba diving and snorkeling due to availability of coral reefs around the island.

As of 2020, legislators in the Thai parliament have put forward a proposal to build an 18 km (11 mi) bridge linking mainland Nakhon Si Thammarat Province with Ko Samui. The MPs claim that the project would spur economic growth in south Thailand. They propose that—if built—it be named "Chan-o-cha" in honour of Prime Minister Prayut Chan-o-cha.

Ko Samui's tourist appeal made it a plotline of the 2000 comedy movie Meet the Parents, starring Ben Stiller and Robert De Niro, as well as shooting location for the third season of The White Lotus.

== Culture ==
Ko Samui has its own specific dialect, customs, cuisine, and observed ceremonies. A number of rituals, festivals, and other events take place across the island over the year, such as Loy Khro, where bamboo boats floated on top of immature coconuts are launched into the sea. These small boats carry hair, nail clippings, and other offerings said to cast away misfortune. The Southern Thai tradition of Gin Hor, where villagers bring together homemade food to share, continues to be celebrated in the form of temple fairs and beach gatherings. The ritual of Lah Pho Ta is held in June before village shrines as a way to honor guardian spirits with savory and sweet offerings, followed by the Manora. In addition to more traditional festivals, new celebrations have developed, such as the Samui Latin Festival and the Samui Regatta. There is a small but developing LGBTQ+ scene in Ko Samui, with the first Ko Samui Pride Celebration taking place in 2018, and the ALPHA Gay Resort and gay-owned café The Road Less Travelled (RLT) both frequented by LGBTQ+ tourists.

A number of culturally-specific dishes are native to Ko Samui, including the raw fish and fermented shrimp paste salad known as Yam Rad Ley, the spicy coconut salads Yam Kati Hoi Phuekan and Yam Kati Goong Chon Nam Groi, the squid broth Tom Look Em, and the reef squid coconut milk mixture known as Wai Khua. Night markets are a staple on the island, as in many parts of Thailand, with some of the most popular being Fisherman's Village, the Wharf, and Plaza the Green Night Market.

== Transport ==
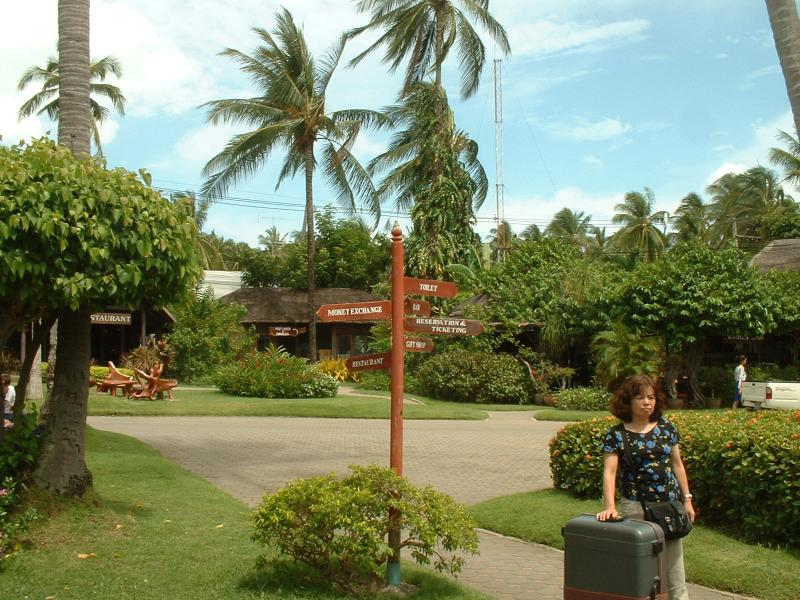
Samui Airport

Samui Airport is a private airport built and owned by Bangkok Airways, which is the only airline with services to Ko Samui from mainland Thailand since the airport's construction in 1989. Due to its use of locally produced palm leaves and a natural, open-air cooling system, the terminal complex received an Environment Impact Assessment Award under the guidance of Prasert Prasarttong-Osoth. Ko Samui airport is built in an open style, drawing connections between it and traditional Thai architecture.

Flights from Samui to Phuket and other Thai destinations are available, and in 2012, the Thai government announced the possibility of a second Ko Samui airport due to complaints of high airport fees.

Several ferries connect the island with the mainland, including two car/passenger ferries, and connect Don Sak to piers in the west of the island, in Lipa Noi and in Nathon. Public buses to all parts of the mainland operate from a new bus station north of Nathon. Privately operated songthaews circle the ring road like a bus service with fixed fees mostly only in the daytime, and private taxis which charged a fixed, flat fee depending on the destination.

== Education ==
There are a number of international schools on the island, including Windfield International School Koh Samui (WIS), the International School of Samui, Lamai International School, Oonrak Koh Samui Bilingual School, Greenacre International School, PanyaDee - The British International School of Samui (PBISS).

Suratthani Rajabhat University (SRU) opened its Koh Samui Interdisciplinary School (initially known as the International School of Tourism) in 2010, offering two bachelor's degrees in Hotel Management and Cruise Business and Thai and International Culinary Arts.

== Healthcare ==
Samui has five private hospitals: Samui International Hospital; Wattanapat Hospital Samui; Thai International; Bandon Hospital; and Bangkok Hospital Samui. The government hospital is in Nathon.

A few health emergencies have taken place in the 20th and 21st centuries in Ko Samui, including multiple outbreaks of dengue hemorrhagic fever (DHF), at least two cases of leptospirosis, and at least two cases of chikungunya The island's healthcare system was severely strained during the COVID-19 pandemic. In July 2021, it was reported that there were 54 beds available for COVID-19 patients in Koh Samui Hospital. Field hospitals were set up in repurposed resorts to handle overflow.

== Gallery ==
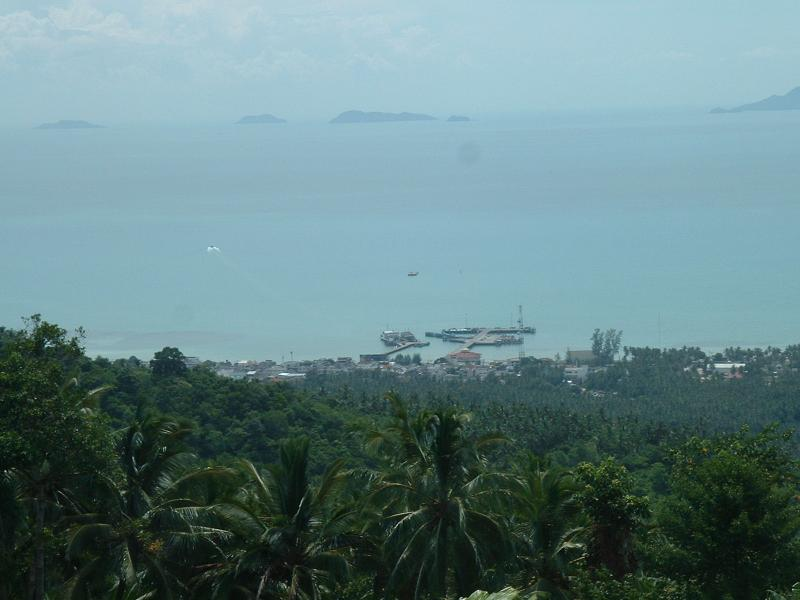
Mountainside view of Nathon

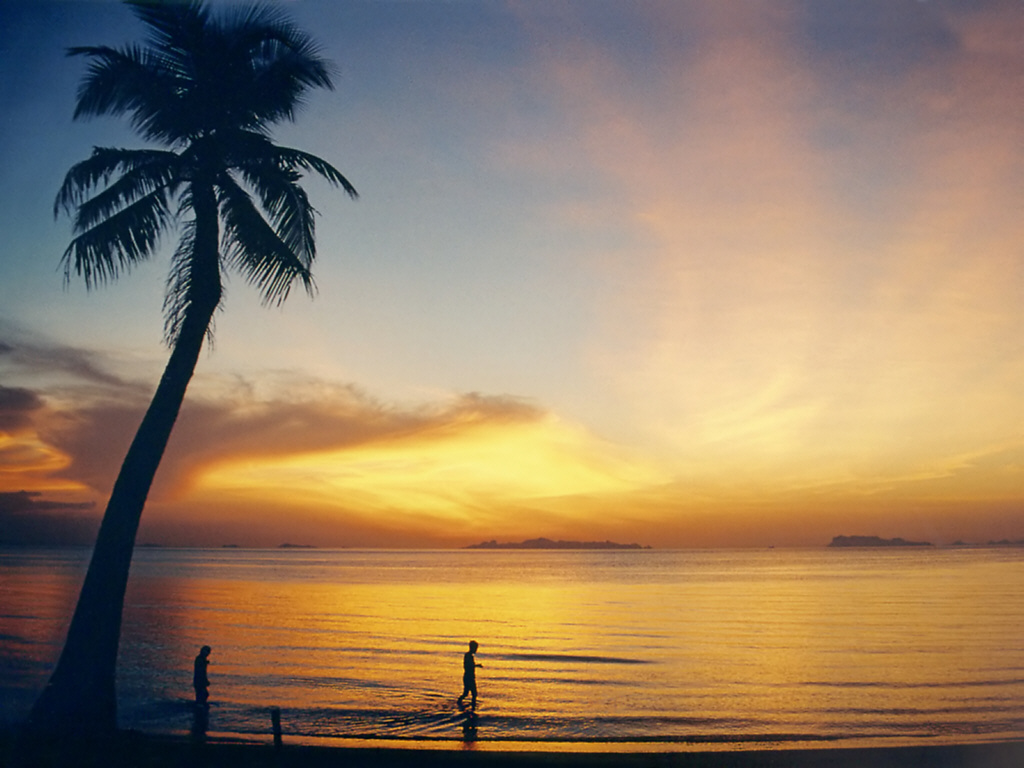
Lipa Noi Beach

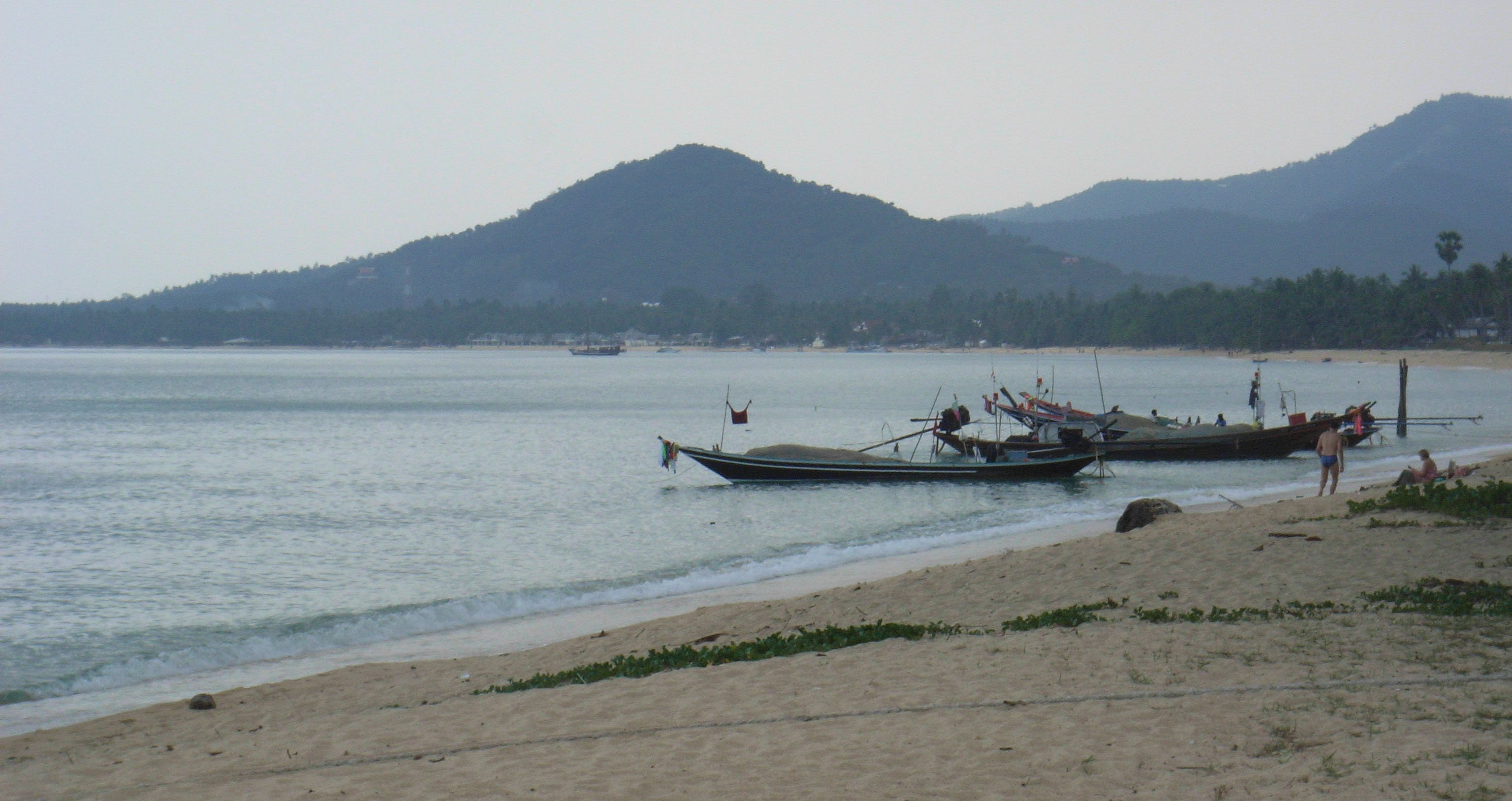
Bo Phut Beach

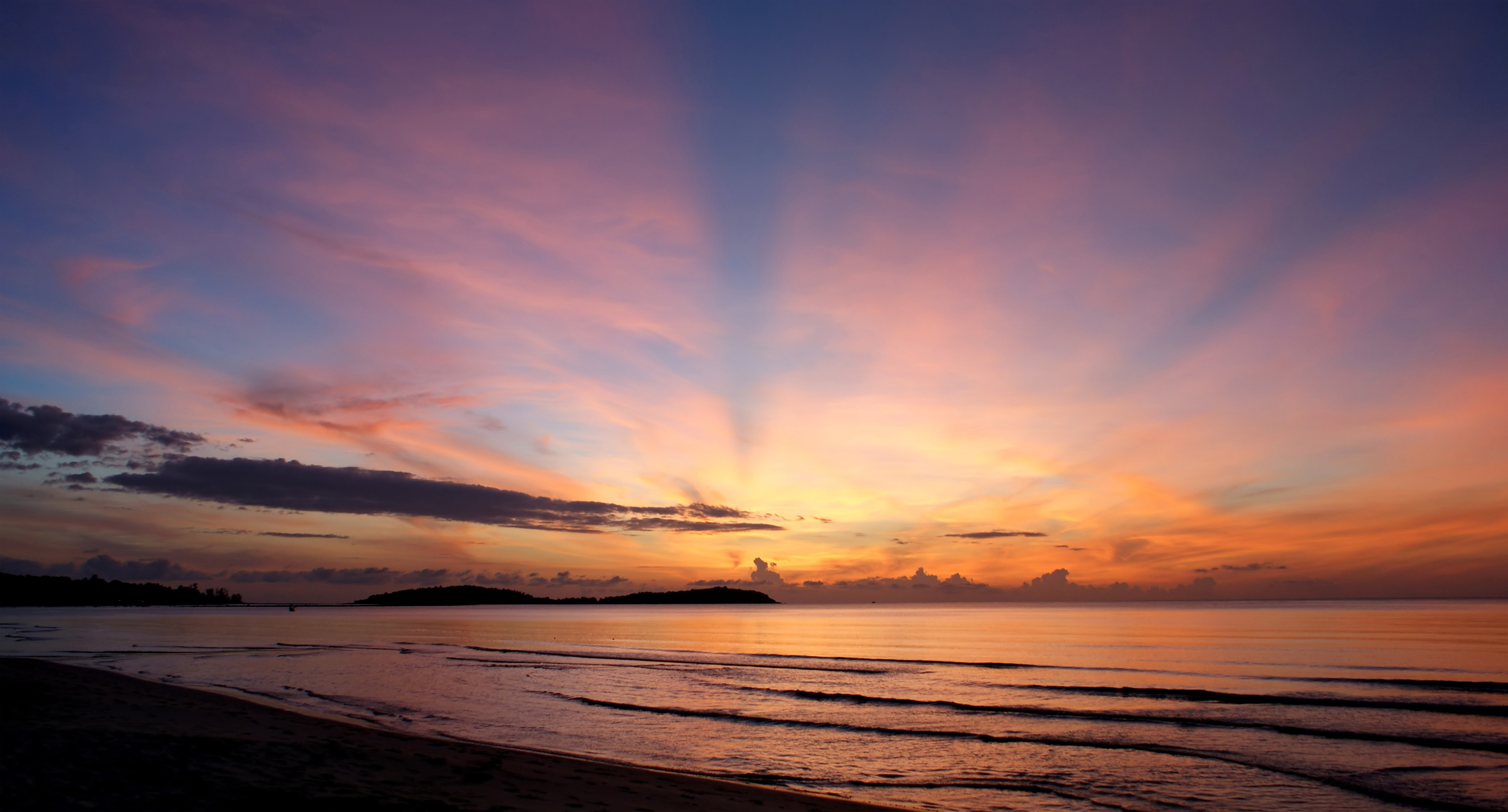
Sunrise, Ko Samui

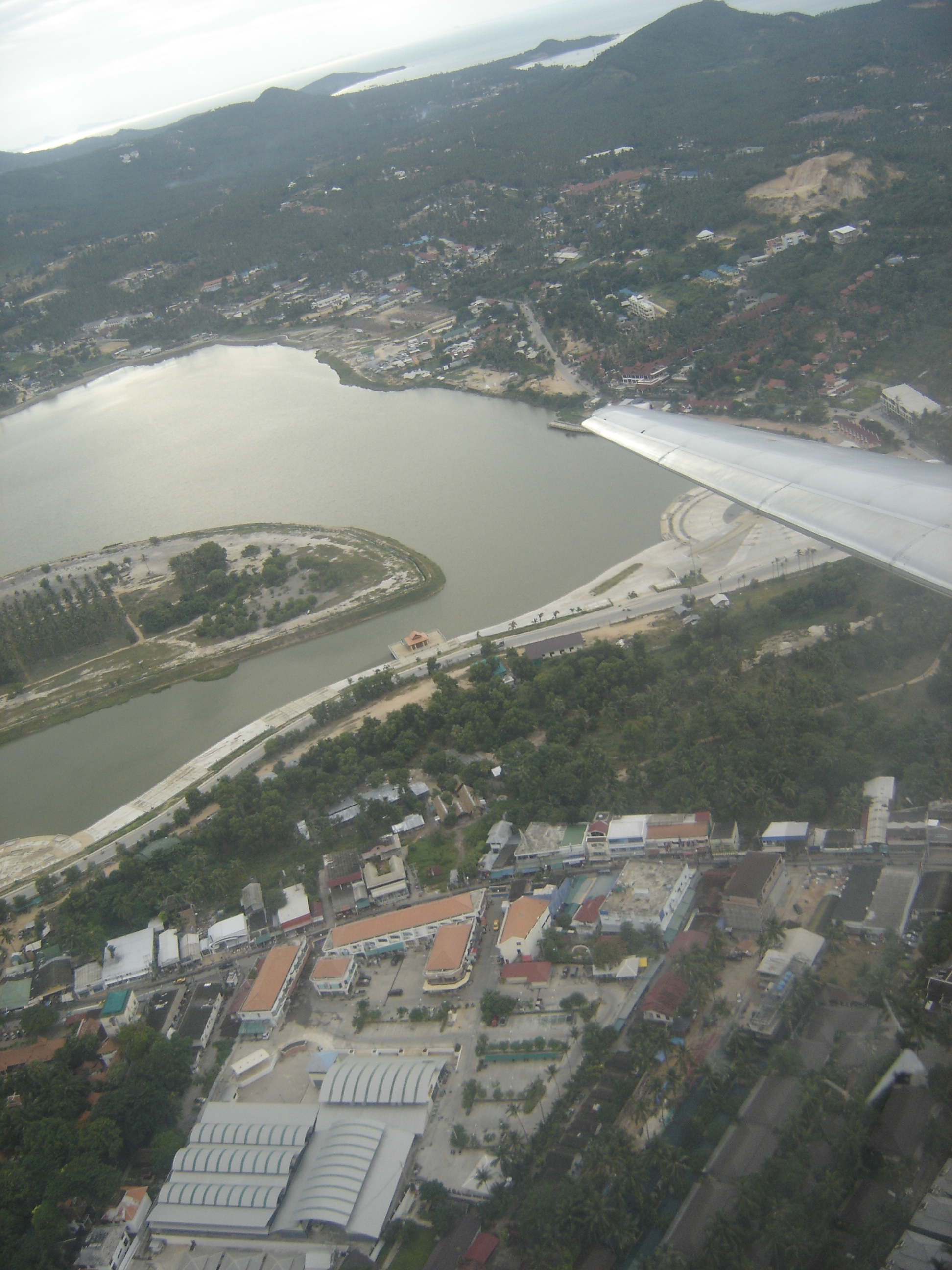
Aerial view of Chaweng

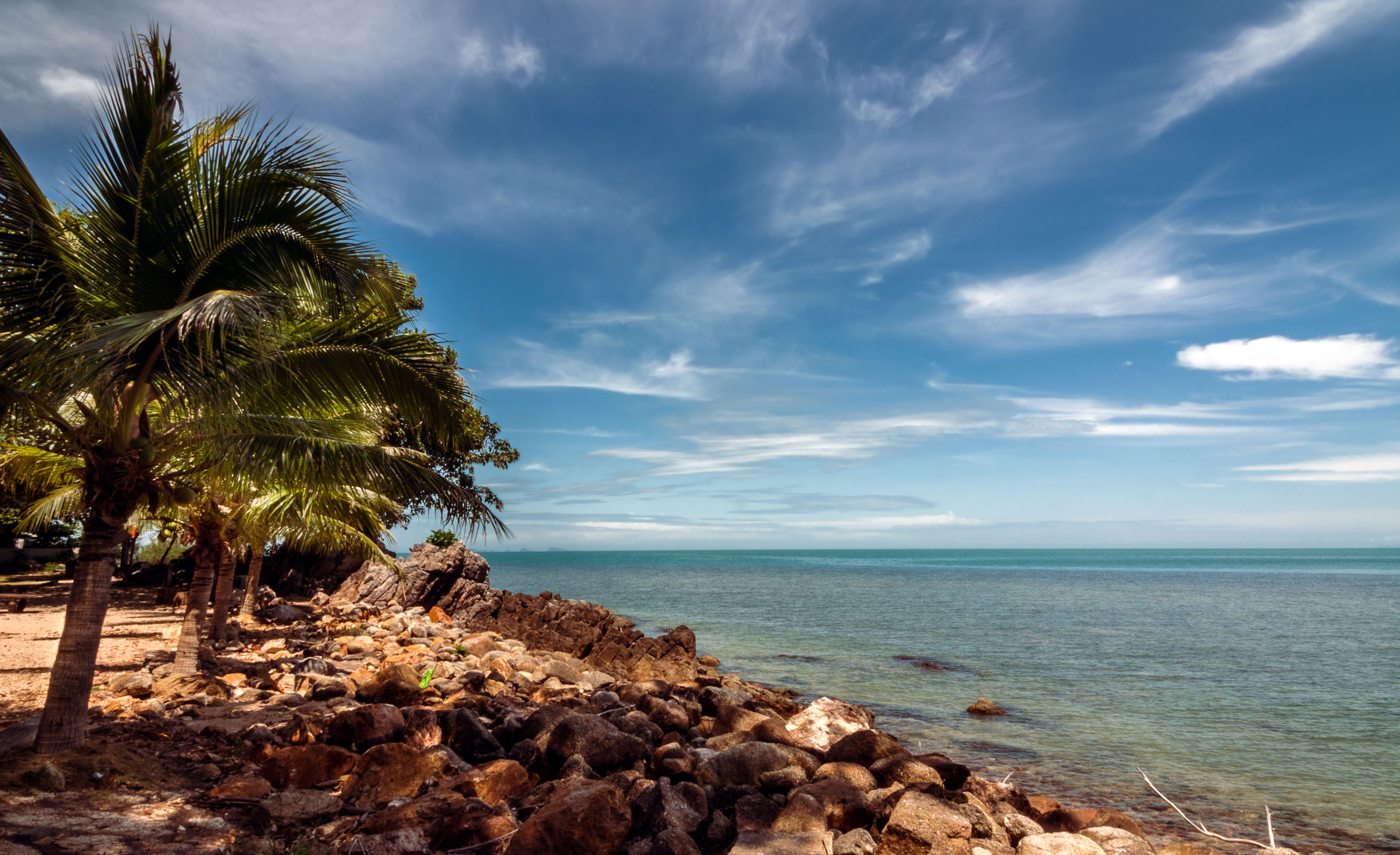
Laem Yai Cape from Bang Po Beach

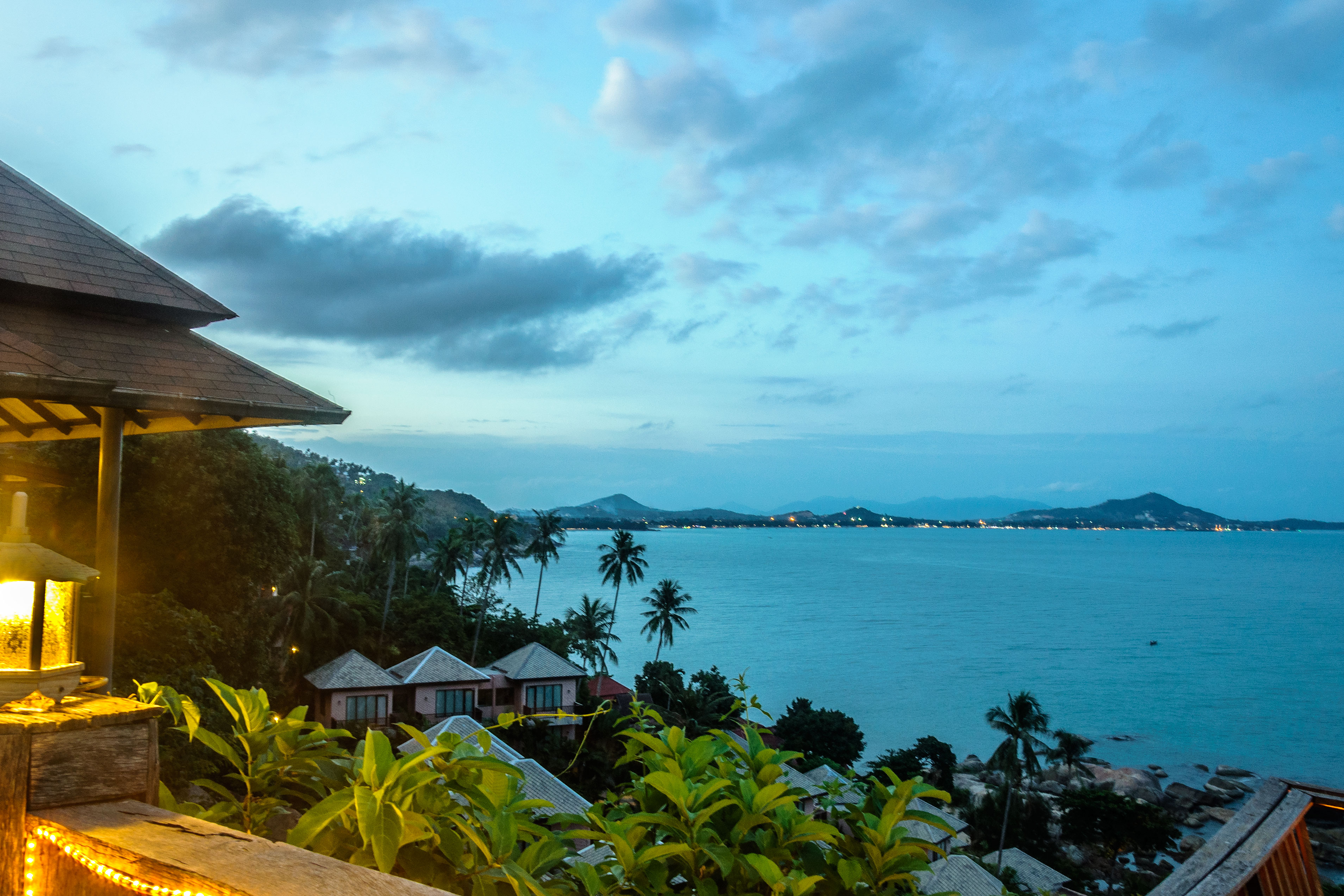
Chaweng Beach between Lamai and Chaweng

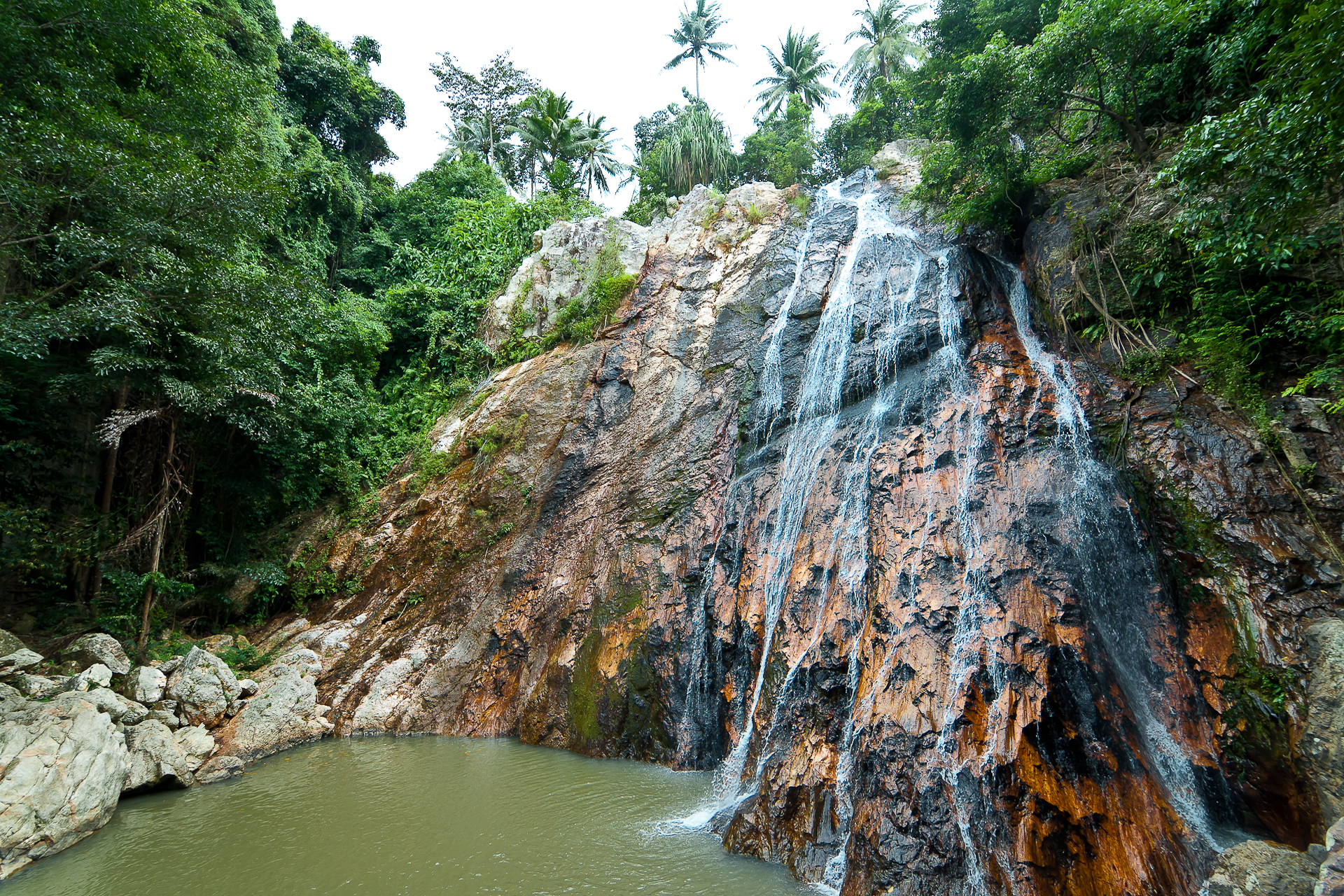
Namuang Waterfall

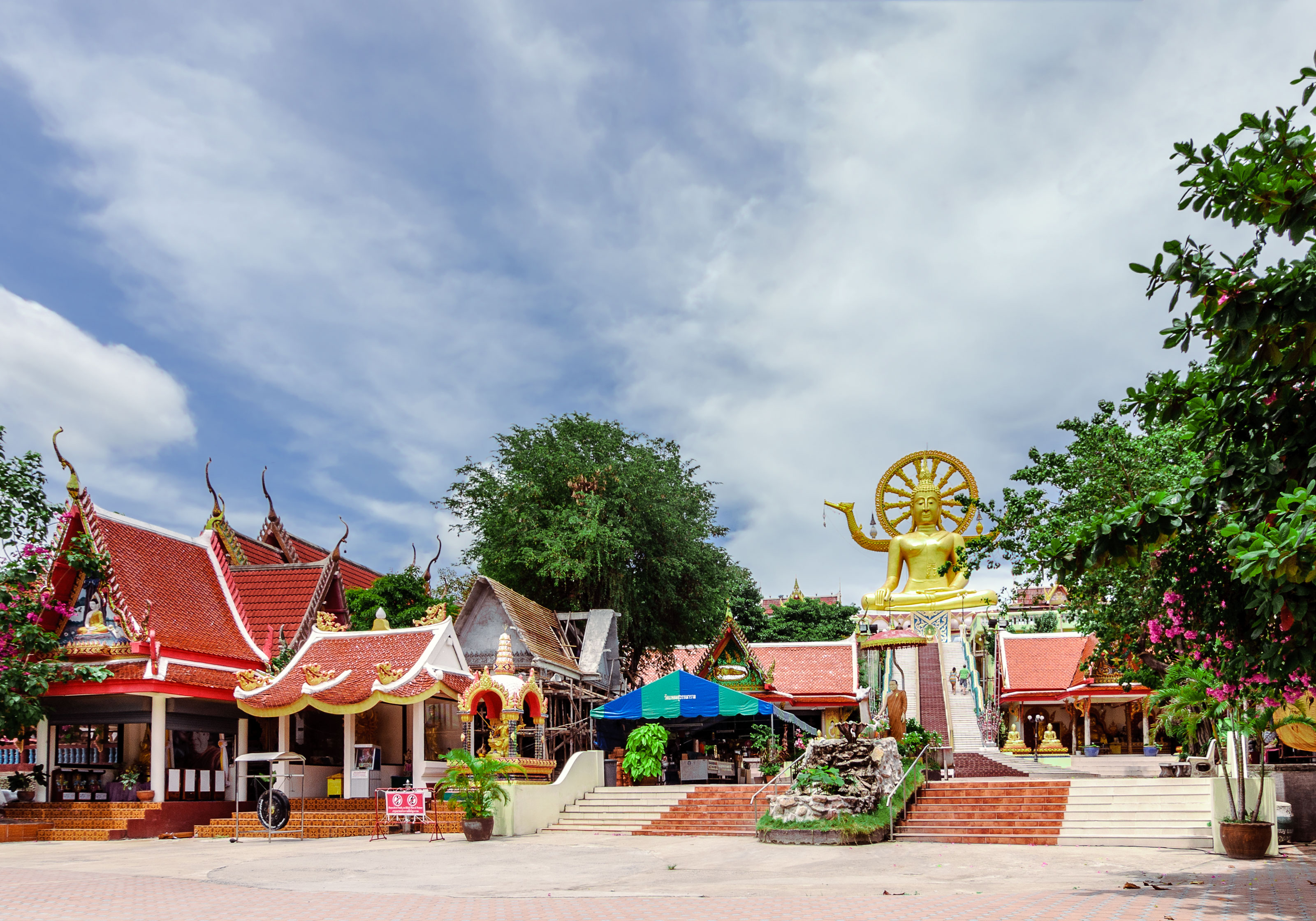
Big Buddha Temple (Wat Phra Yai)

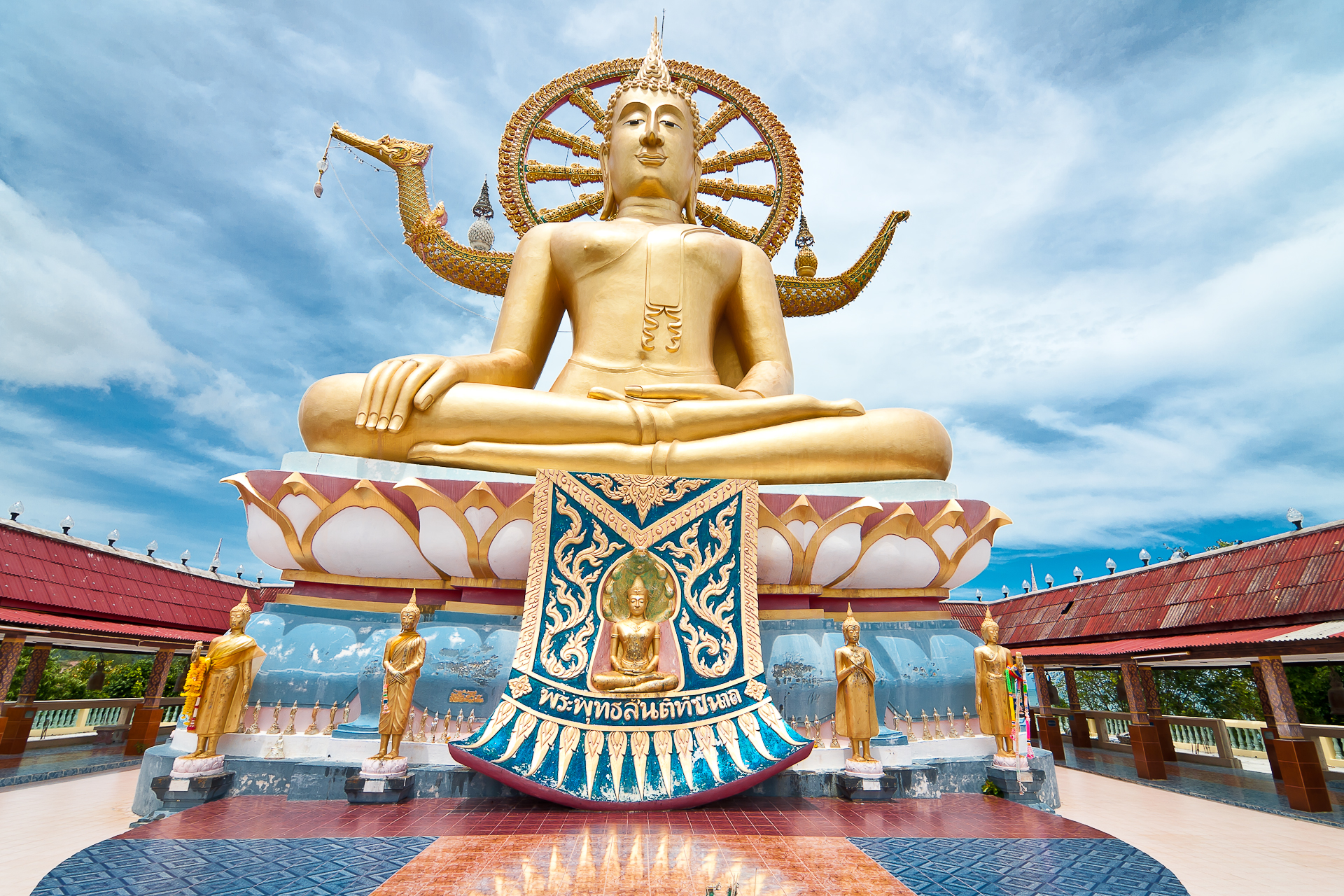
Buddha statue, Big Buddha Temple (Wat Phra Yai)

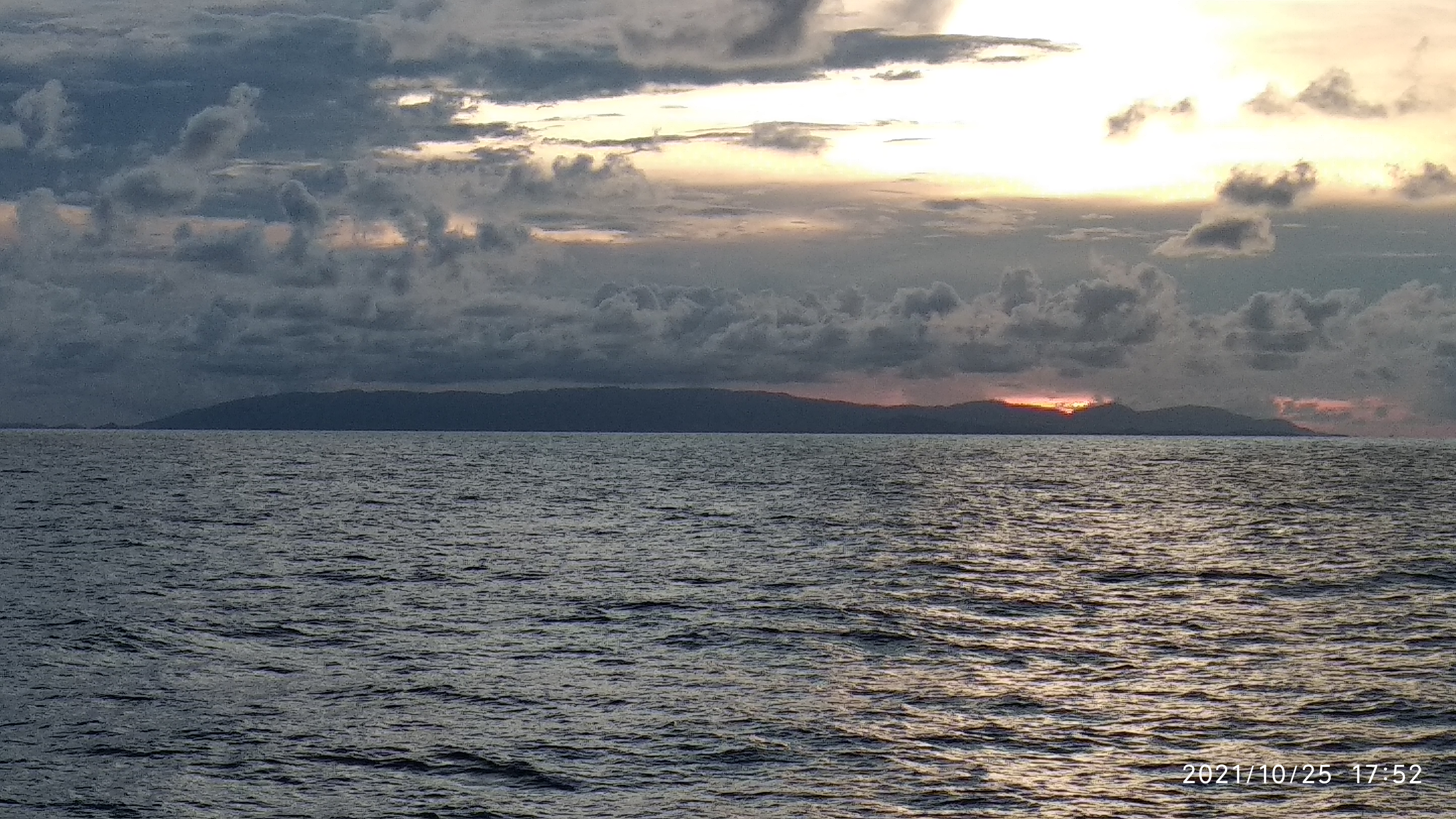
Ko Samui island

== See also ==
- List of islands of Thailand
- Tourism Association of Koh Samui
