= Nathon =

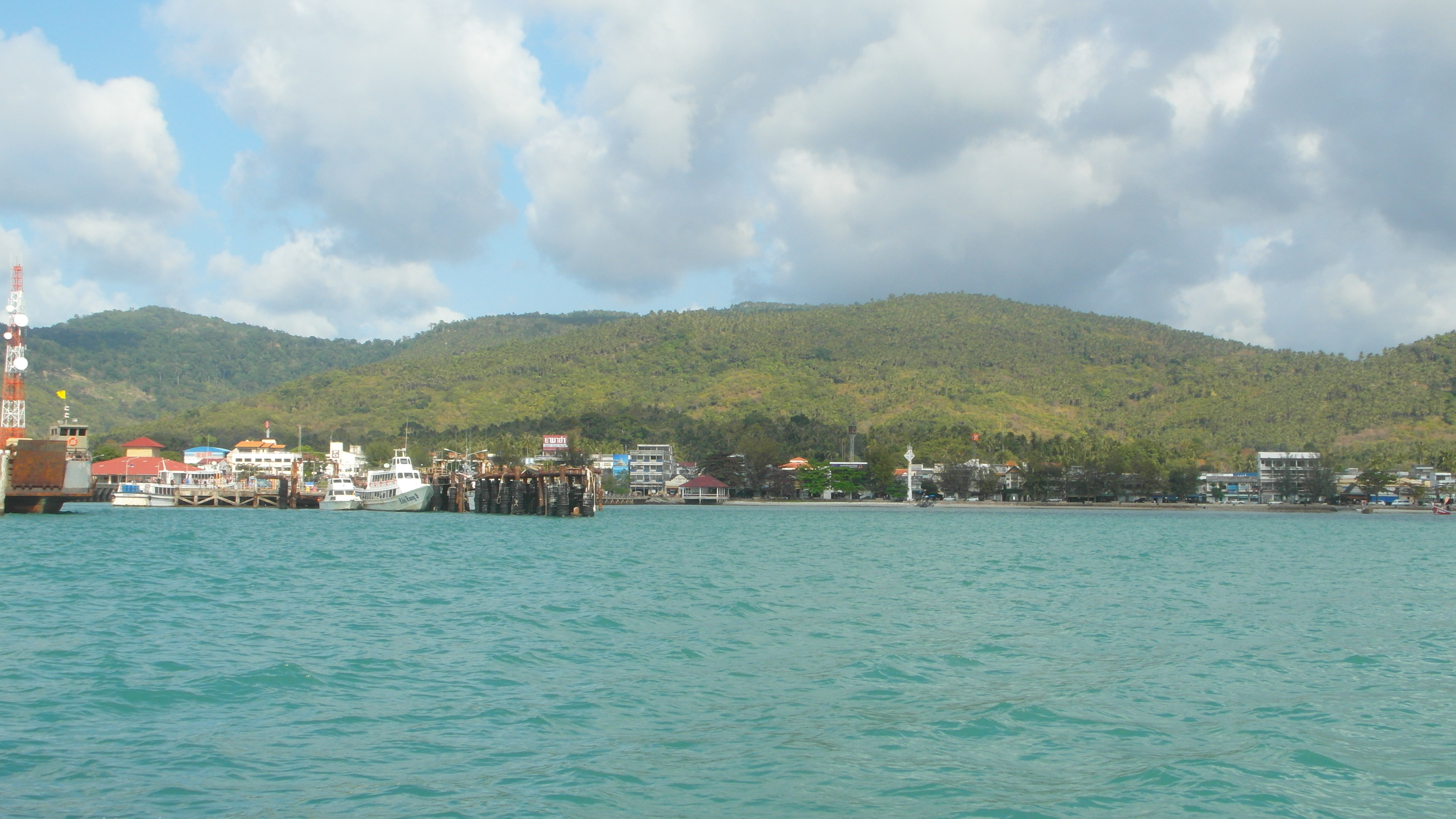

Nathon (Thai: หน้าทอน) is a town on the west coast of the Thai island of Ko Samui, a commercial center and a major port for fishing and transport of goods and people to mainland Thailand.

Nathon functioned as the island's capital for many years until the growth of tourism and location of the airport pushed the center of commercial activity further east. It has retained several government offices.
