= Ko Phi Phi Le =

Island in the Andaman Sea

Native name: เกาะพีพีดอน
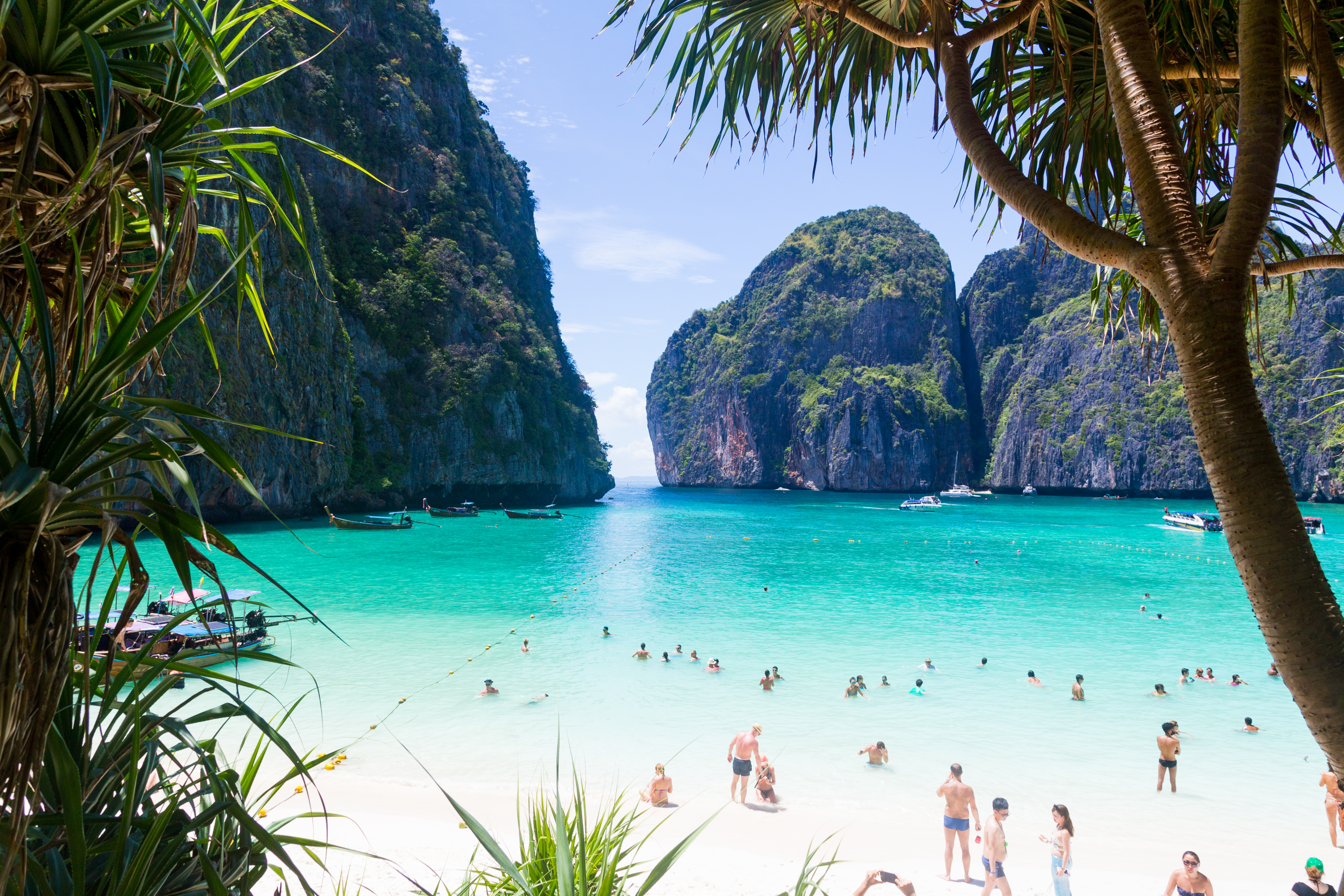
- Maya Bay beach in 2017
- Interactive map of Ko Phi Phi Le

Geography
- Location: Strait of Malacca
- Coordinates: 7°40′44″N 98°45′54″E
- Archipelago: Phi Phi Islands
- Area: 2 km^{2} (0.77 sq mi)

Administration
- Thailand
- Province: Krabi
- District: Mueang Krabi
- Subdistrict: Ao Nang

Additional information
- Time zone: UTC+7 (ICT)

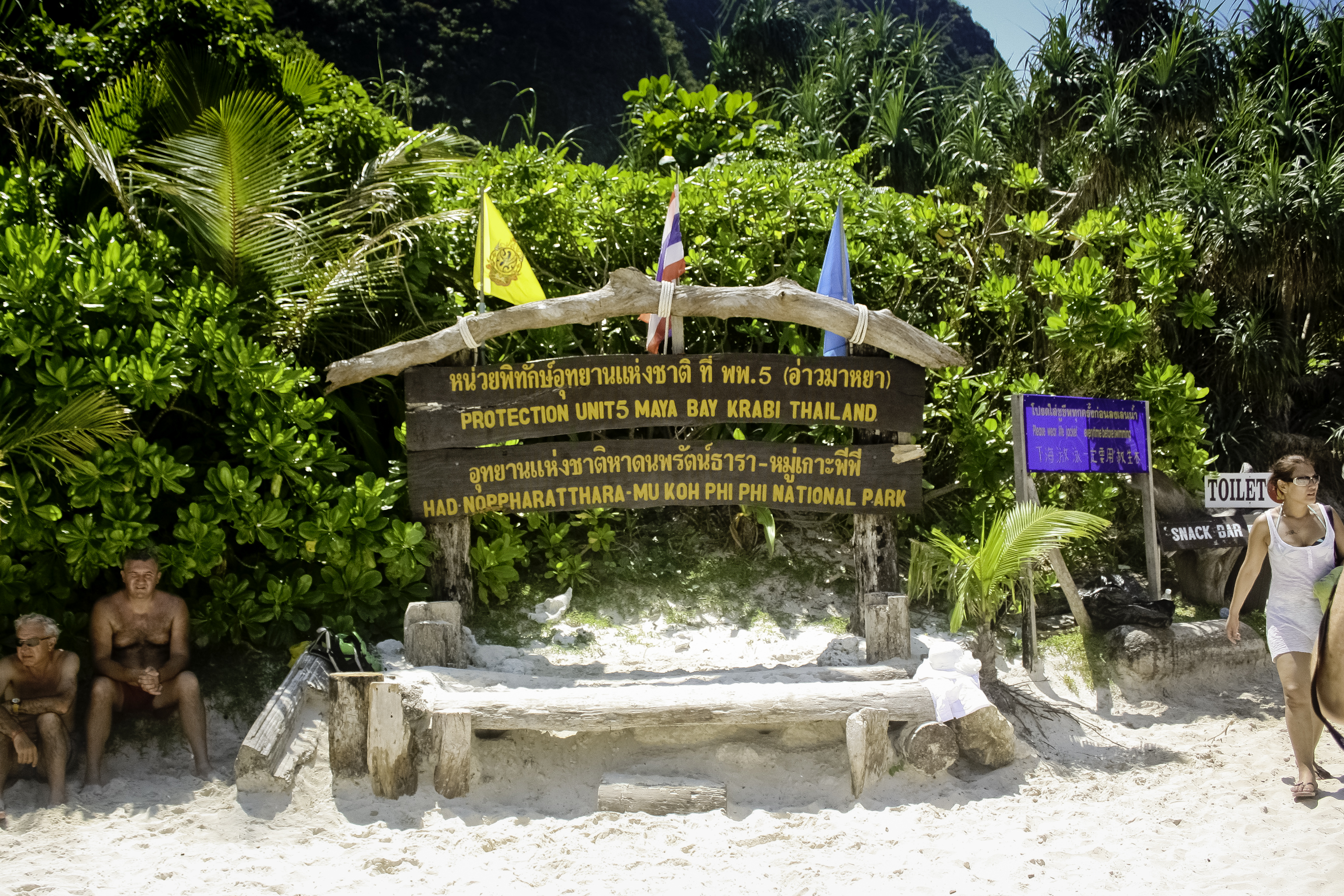
Hat Noppharat Thara–Mu Ko Phi Phi National Park welcome sign

Ko Phi Phi Le or Ko Phi Phi Leh (Thai: เกาะพีพีเล, RTGS: Ko Phiphi Le, pronounced [kɔ̀ʔ pʰīː.pʰīː lēː]) is an island of the Phi Phi Archipelago, Andaman Sea. It is in the Krabi province of Thailand and is part of Hat Noppharat Thara–Mu Ko Phi Phi National Park. Ko Phi Phi Le is home of the famous Maya Bay Beach, which was used in the 2000 film The Beach.

== Geography ==
Ko Phi Phi Le, 2 square kilometres (0.77 sq mi) in area, is the second largest island of the archipelago, the largest being Ko Phi Phi Don. The island consists of a ring of steep limestone hills surrounding two shallow bays, Maya Bay and Loh Samah. During low tide, Maya Bay cannot be accessed directly from the sea via boat, due to shallow waters and coral. Boats must anchor at the deeper Loh Samah, requiring people to walk through a short section of rocks and jungle to reach Maya Bay itself. There is also one large shallow fjord-like inlet called Pi Ley with a small coral reef at the entrance. Maya Bay harbors bioluminescent plankton.

== Tourism ==
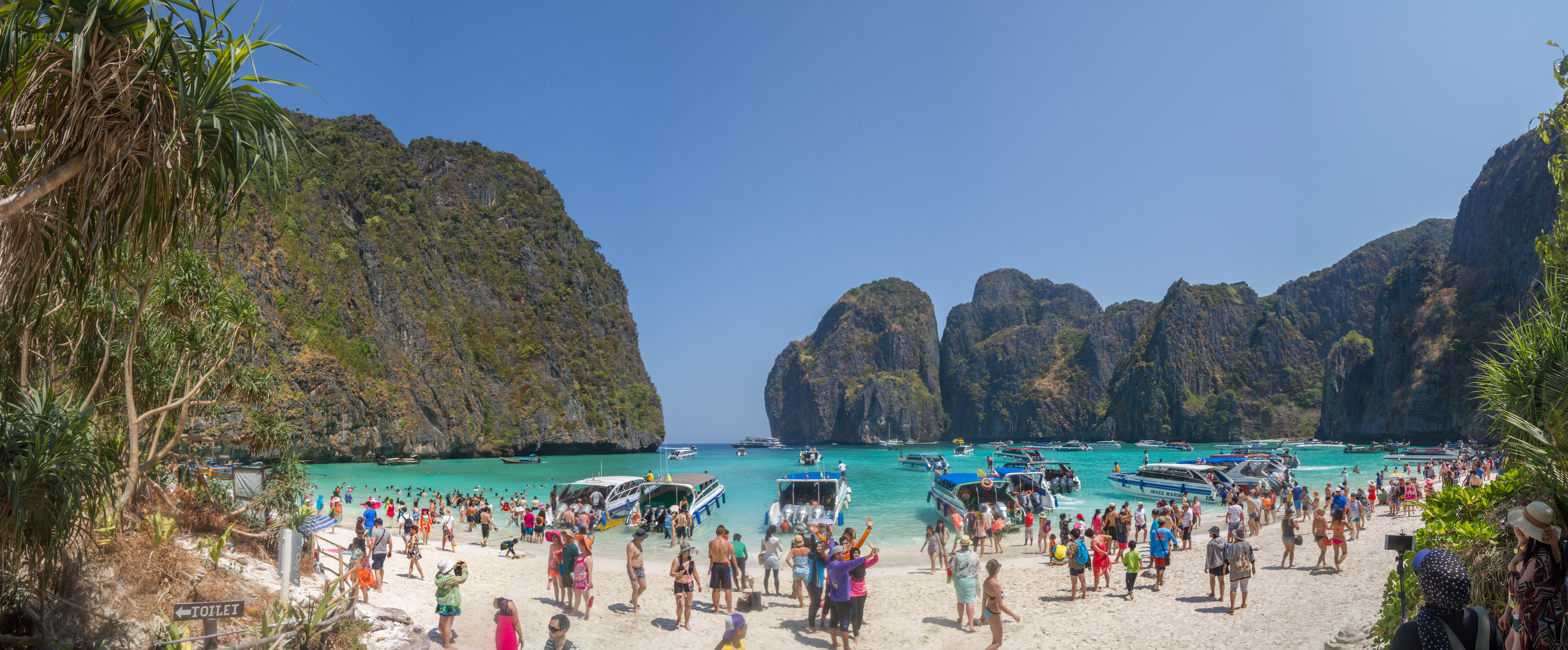
Maya Bay beach in 2016

Hat Noppharat Thara–Mu Ko Phi Phi National Park as a whole, from October 2015 to May 2016, generated revenues of 362 million baht from 1.2 million tourists, 77 percent foreign. In 2018, the Maya Bay cove and beach closed temporarily, and then indefinitely to visitors because of environmental issues caused by overtourism. The cove reopened to tourists in early 2022, after nearly four years of closure.

== Environmental issues ==
Controversy arose regarding the 1999 production of the film The Beach, released February 2000, due to 20th Century Fox bulldozing and landscaping the natural beach setting of Ko Phi Phi Le to make it more "paradise-like". The production altered sand dunes and planted nonindigenous coconut trees and grasses to widen the beach. These alterations, along with the subsequent tourism boom that occurred after the film's release damaged or destroyed 80% of the coral in Maya Bay's reef.

The production company also claimed to have removed 5 tonnes of garbage from the beach, left behind by tourists. Offers to restore this along with replanting were not accepted. Fox set aside funds to reconstruct and return the beach to its natural state. Nevertheless, environmental lawsuits were filed as the damage to the ecosystem is likely permanent and restoration attempts failed.

The lawsuits dragged on for years. In 2006, Thailand's supreme court upheld an appeals court ruling that the filming had harmed the environment and ordered that damage assessments be made. Defendants in the case included 20th Century Fox and some Thai government officials. Fox was cited a fine of 10 million Thai baht (approximately $273,000 USD).

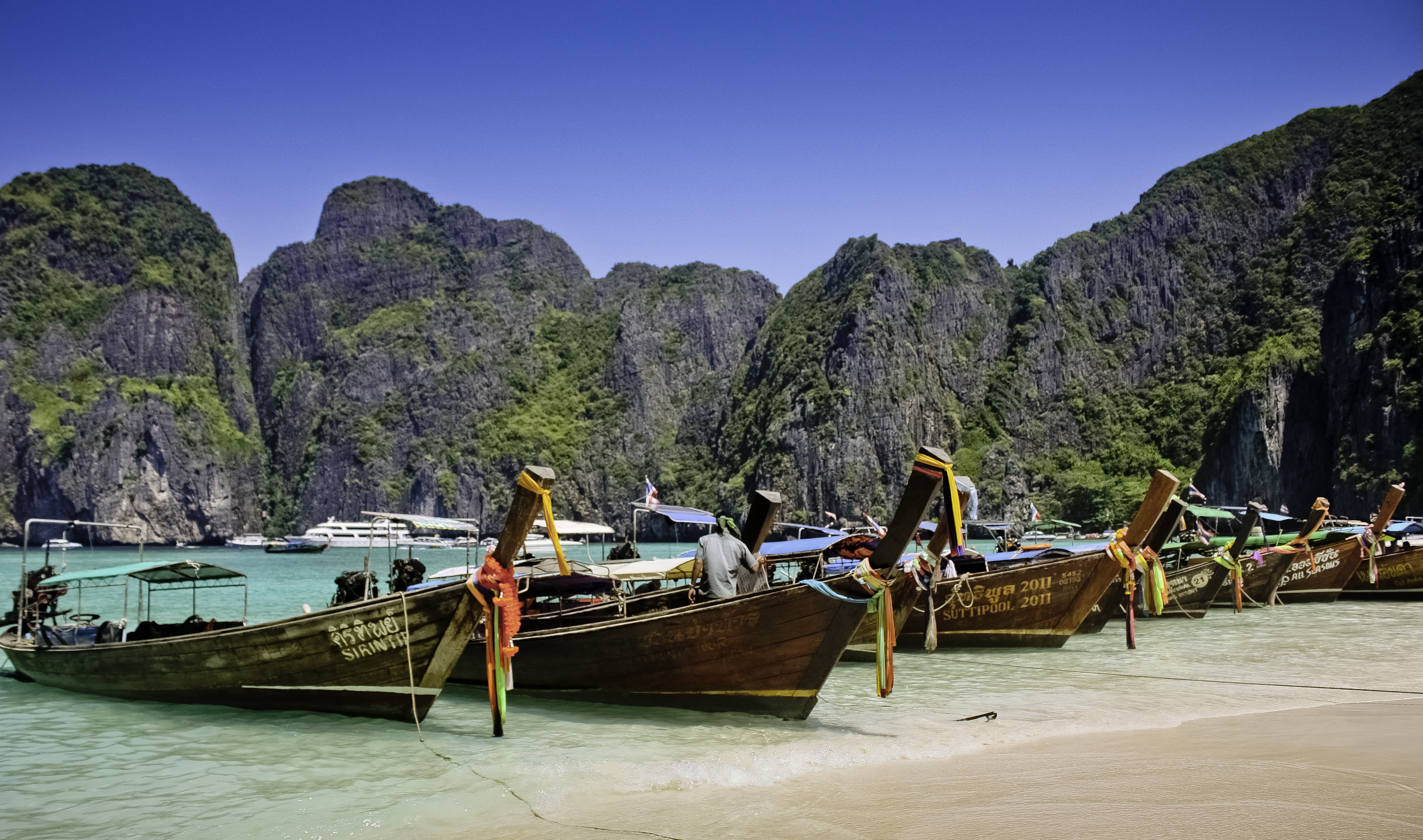
Longtail boats, Maya Bay, 2012

The Department of National Parks, Wildlife and Plant Conservation claims to be investigating ways to control tourist numbers amid concerns that visitors are destroying the environment at marine tourism spots. The move was prompted by marine scientist Thon Thamrongnawasawat, who posted photos of large numbers of low-season tourists packed onto small Maya Beach. According to Mr Thon, during low season 2016, about 5,000 tourists a day crowd onto Maya beach, which is just 250 metres long and 15 metres wide. The beach has 14 available toilets. Tourists are worth 1.6 million baht a day to the park. Thon said that state agencies were running campaigns to drum up tourist numbers with no regard for the environment's carrying capacity.

In March 2018, Thai authorities announced that Maya Beach would be closed to tourists for four months to allow it to recover from environmental damage due to excessive visitor numbers. The beach had been receiving an estimated 5,000 visitors per day, while 200 boats per day set anchor in the bay. Surveys by marine biologists had found that 80 percent of the coral reefs surrounding the bay have been destroyed by boat traffic and pollution; marine life was virtually nonexistent as a result. When Maya Beach reopens visitor numbers will be limited to 2,000 people per day and boats will have to dock outside the bay. The government will spend 100 million baht to construct a boat parking zone and floating pier to receive tourists. It will use an online ticketing system to manage sales and income from entry fees.

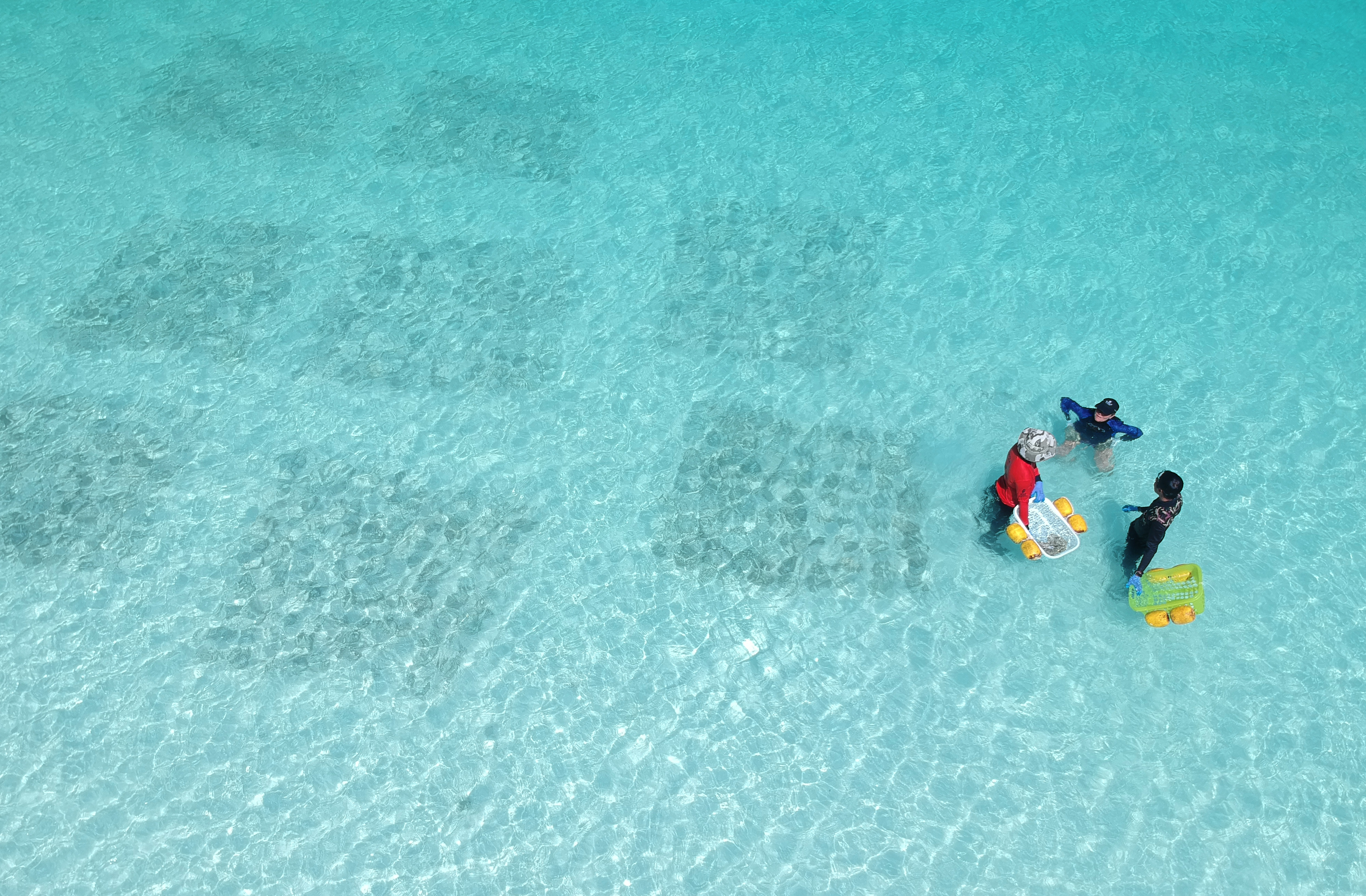
Coral propagation in progress at Maya Bay in 2019

In June 2018, work on coral rehabilitation was initiated by the Marine National Park Operation Center 3 based in Trang. The coral rehabilitation system and methodology was obtained from Ocean Quest Global. Local non-governmental organizations like Reef Guardian Thailand also lent their hands in the restoration efforts.

On October 1, 2018, the Thai Department of National Parks, Wildlife and Plant Conservation announced that Maya Beach would be closed indefinitely, because tests performed during the four month closure earlier in the year found the ecological damage to be far more extensive than previously thought. The director of the office, Songtam Suksawang, said that the beach "was completely destroyed, along with the plants which covered it," and that reopening would not occur until the ecosystem "fully recovers to a normal situation."

In December 2018, it was reported that blacktip reef sharks were seen swimming close to Maya Bay's beach. The bay had been closed to tourism in June due to the damage caused by mass tourism. Marine biologists took the return of the sharks as a positive signal that the tourist ban was allowing the ecosystem to heal.

By February 2019, over 15,000 corals from several local species have been propagated in the bay. The system of rehabilitation is fully organic and no artificial or man-made materials were introduced in the coral rehabilitation project. It is the largest coral rehabilitation project in the world that uses only natural means.

The restoration period for the bay was lengthened due to travel restrictions during the COVID-19 pandemic. Blacktip sharks began breeding there again. In 2022, the bay reopened to tourists, under strict protocols of no boats, no swimming and no more than a one hour visit per person for a limited number of visitors at a time.

== See also ==
- Environmental issues with coral reefs
- List of islands of Thailand
- Southeast Asian coral reefs
