= Ko Mai Phai =

Island in Thailand

Native name: เกาะไม้ไผ่
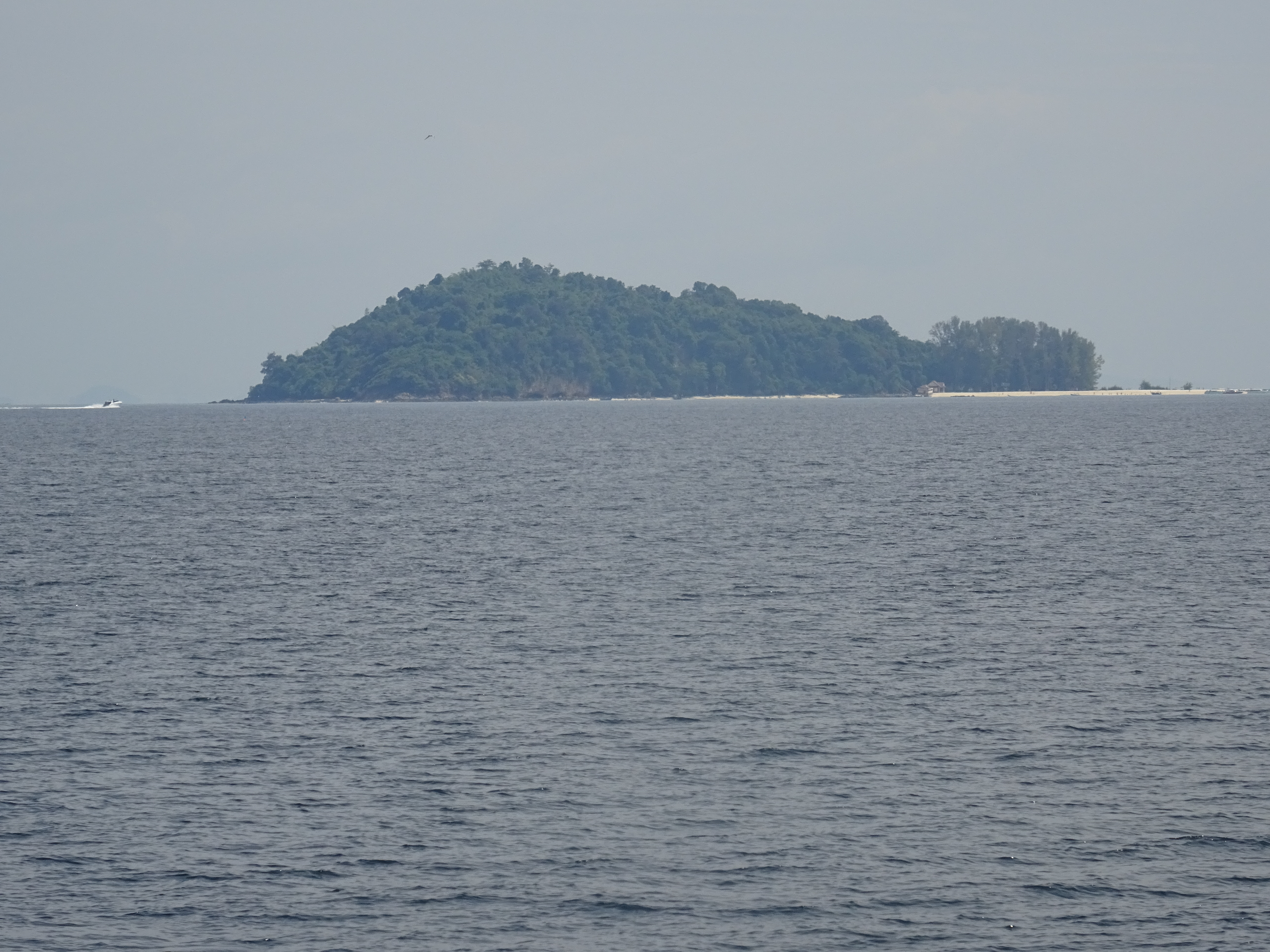
- Ko Mai Phai as seen from a boat going from Ko Phi Phi Don to Krabi
- Interactive map of Ko Mai Phai

Geography
- Location: Strait of Malacca
- Coordinates: 7.8167°N 98.79546°E
- Archipelago: Phi Phi Islands
- Area: 0.27 km^{2} (0.10 sq mi)

Administration
- Thailand
- Province: Krabi
- District: Mueang Krabi
- Tambon: Ao Nang

Additional information
- Time zone: ICT (UTC+7)

Ko Mai Phai is a small island in Thailand, located between the Krabi coast and the Phi Phi Islands.

== Name ==
Though the island is also referred to by the English name Bamboo Island, the name was given by mistake, as no bamboo grows on the island. The name of the casuarina tree – groves of which cover most of the island – was wrongly translated as "bamboo".

== Tourism ==
Ko Mai Phai is a popular destination for snorkeling. Lionfish, leopard sharks and hawksbill sea turtles may be found in the surrounding waters.
