= Ko Phi Phi Don =

Island in the Andaman Sea

Native name: เกาะพีพีดอน
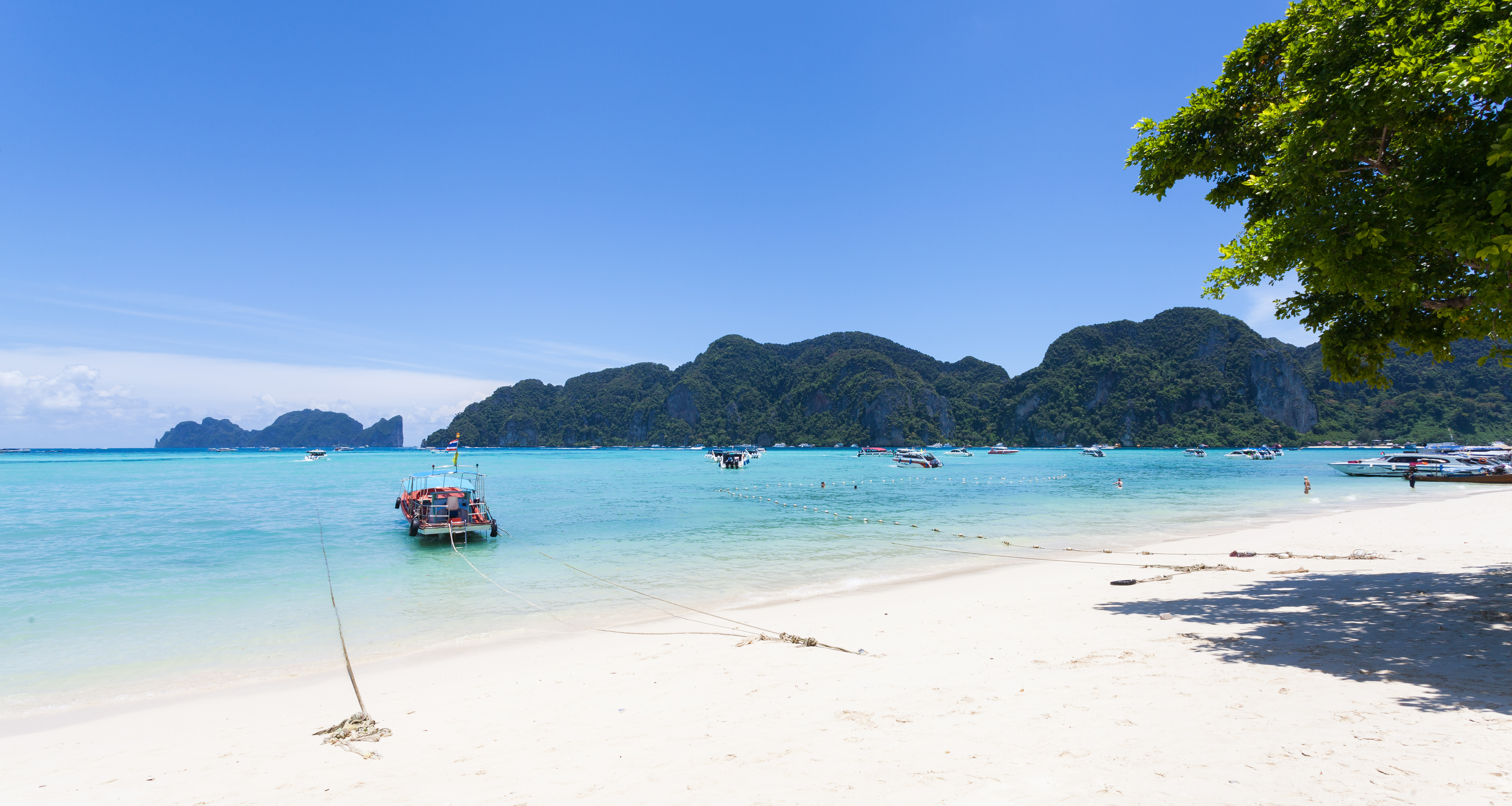
- Beach, Phi Phi Don
- Interactive map of Ko Phi Phi Don

Geography
- Location: Strait of Malacca
- Coordinates: 7.7529°N 98.7786°E
- Archipelago: Phi Phi Islands
- Area: 10.27 km^{2} (3.97 sq mi)
- Length: 3.5 km (2.17 mi)
- Width: 8 km (5 mi)

Administration
- Thailand
- Province: Krabi
- District: Mueang Krabi
- Tambon: Ao Nang
- Largest Village: Ban Ko Phi Phi

Demographics
- Population: 2,500 (2018)
- Languages: Thai, Southern Thai, Urak Lawoi
- Ethnic groups: Urak Lawoi

Additional information
- Time zone: ICT (UTC+7)
- Postal code: 81210

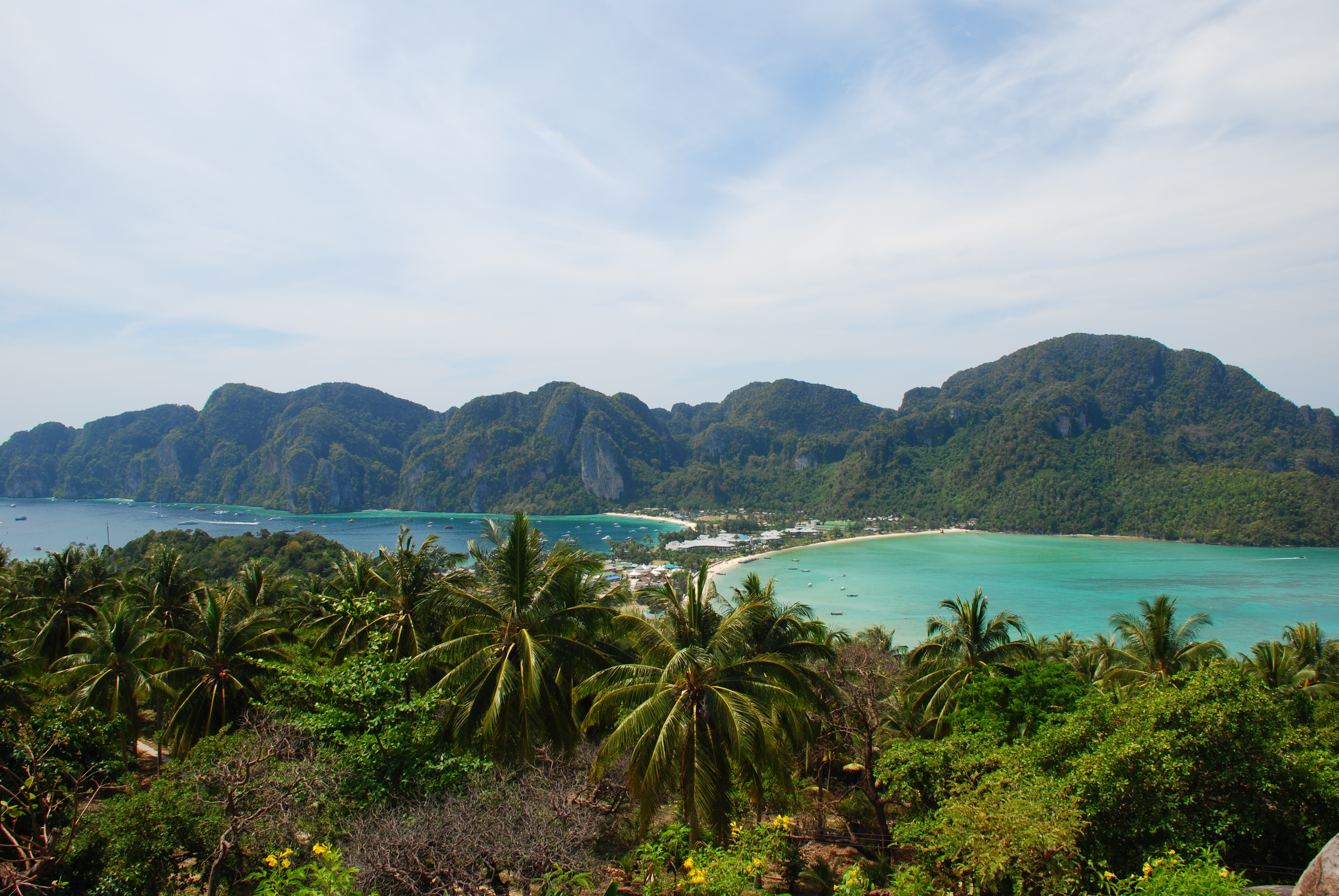
Phi Phi Don looking west

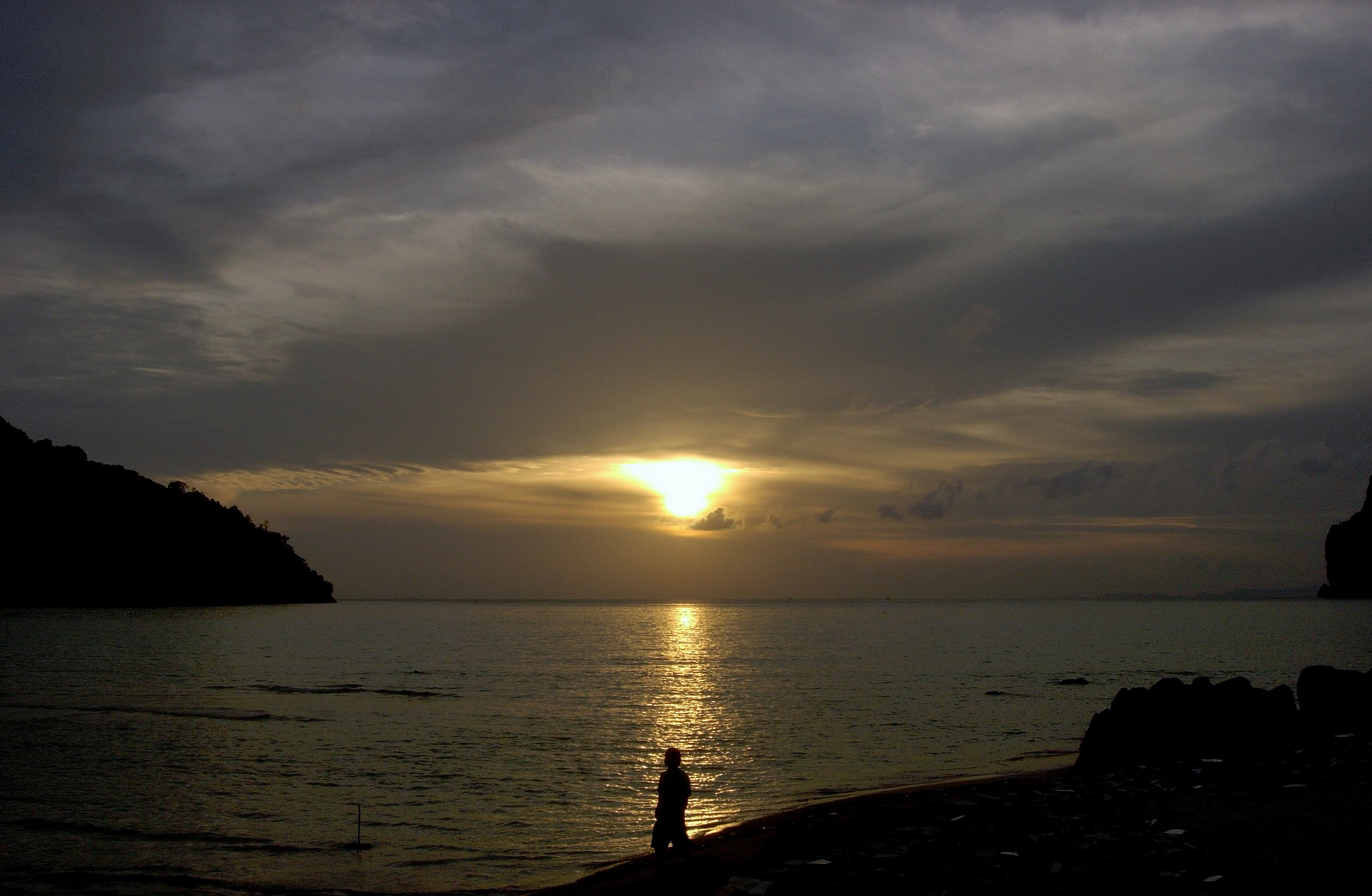
Sunset, Lohdalum Bay

Ko Phi Phi Don (Thai: เกาะพีพีดอน, RTGS: Ko Phiphi Don, pronounced [kɔ̀ʔ pʰīː.pʰīː dɔ̄ːn]) is the largest of the islands in the Phi Phi archipelago, in Thailand. Phi Phi Don is 10.27 km^{2} (3.76 mi^{2}): 8 kilometres (5.0 miles) in length and 3.5 kilometres (2.2 miles) wide. Part of the islands are administratively part of Ao Nang in Krabi Province. It is the only island in the group with permanent inhabitants, although most are temporary workers servicing the tourist trade.

Like the other islands in the archipelago, Phi Phi Don is a non-volcanic island primarily made of limestone. It is almost split into two islands, but a narrow strip of flat land connects them. On this strand lies the largest settlement on the island, as well as most of the resorts.

== Villages ==
- Ban Laem Tong
- Laem Tong
- Ban Ton Sai
- Hat Yao

== 2004 tsunami ==
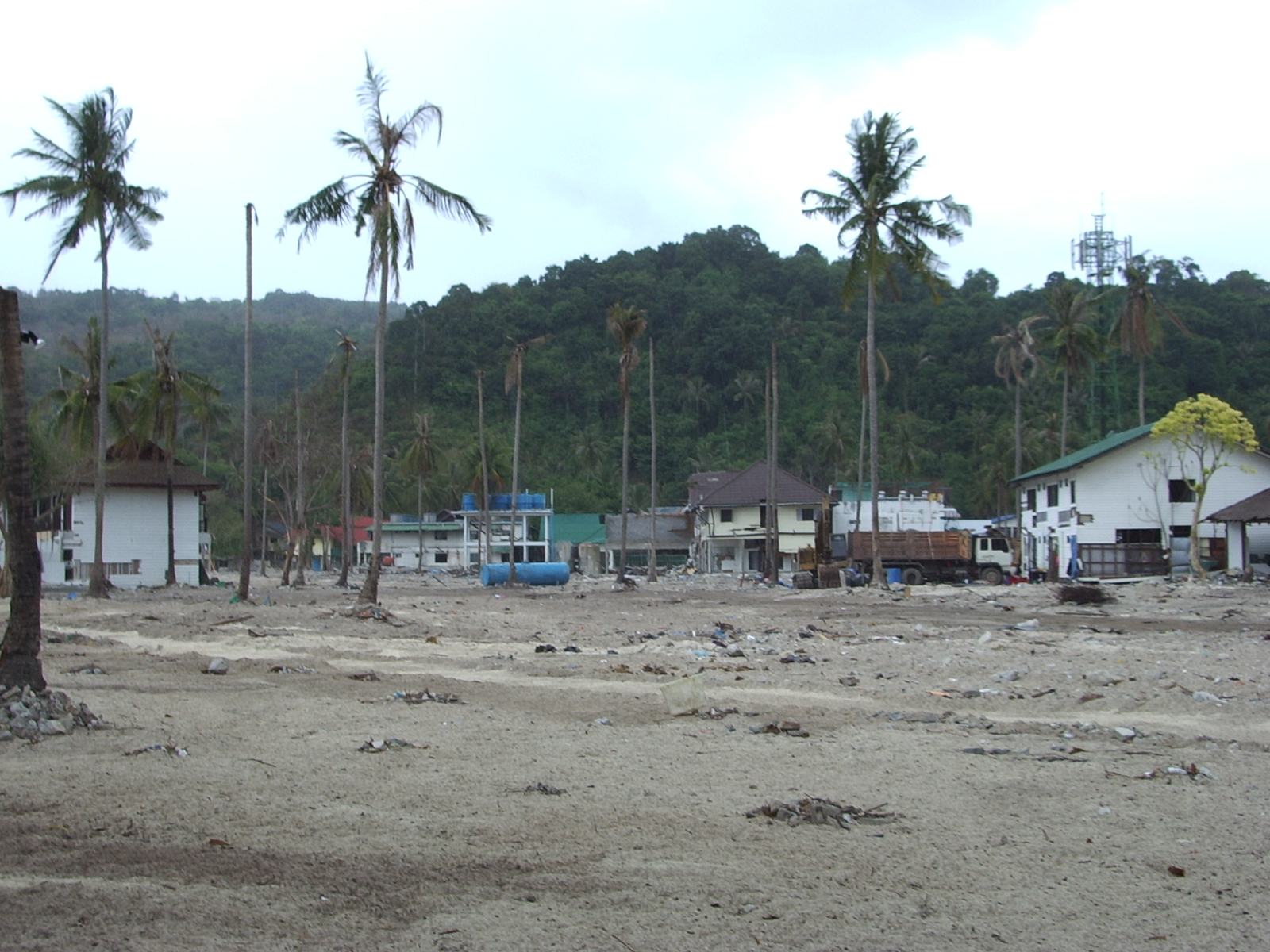
Phi Phi Don in the aftermath of the tsunami, March 2005

More than 1,000 people died on 26 December 2004, when a tsunami struck the island.

Lohdalum Bay was hit the hardest, with the majority of the bungalows and restaurants along the beach destroyed. There is a memorial for those killed in the tsunami on the beach facing Lohdalum Bay. Every year, there is a small memorial service where family members and friends come to pay their respects and share memories of those they lost. A moment of silence is observed at the time the tsunami hit.

There were three waves: the first flooded Lohdalum Bay, the second destroyed all the wooden buildings, and the third, and largest, ruined stone buildings as if they were made of sand. The tsunami lasted only three minutes (from 10:29 to 10:32), but it nearly destroyed the entire island.

== Environment ==
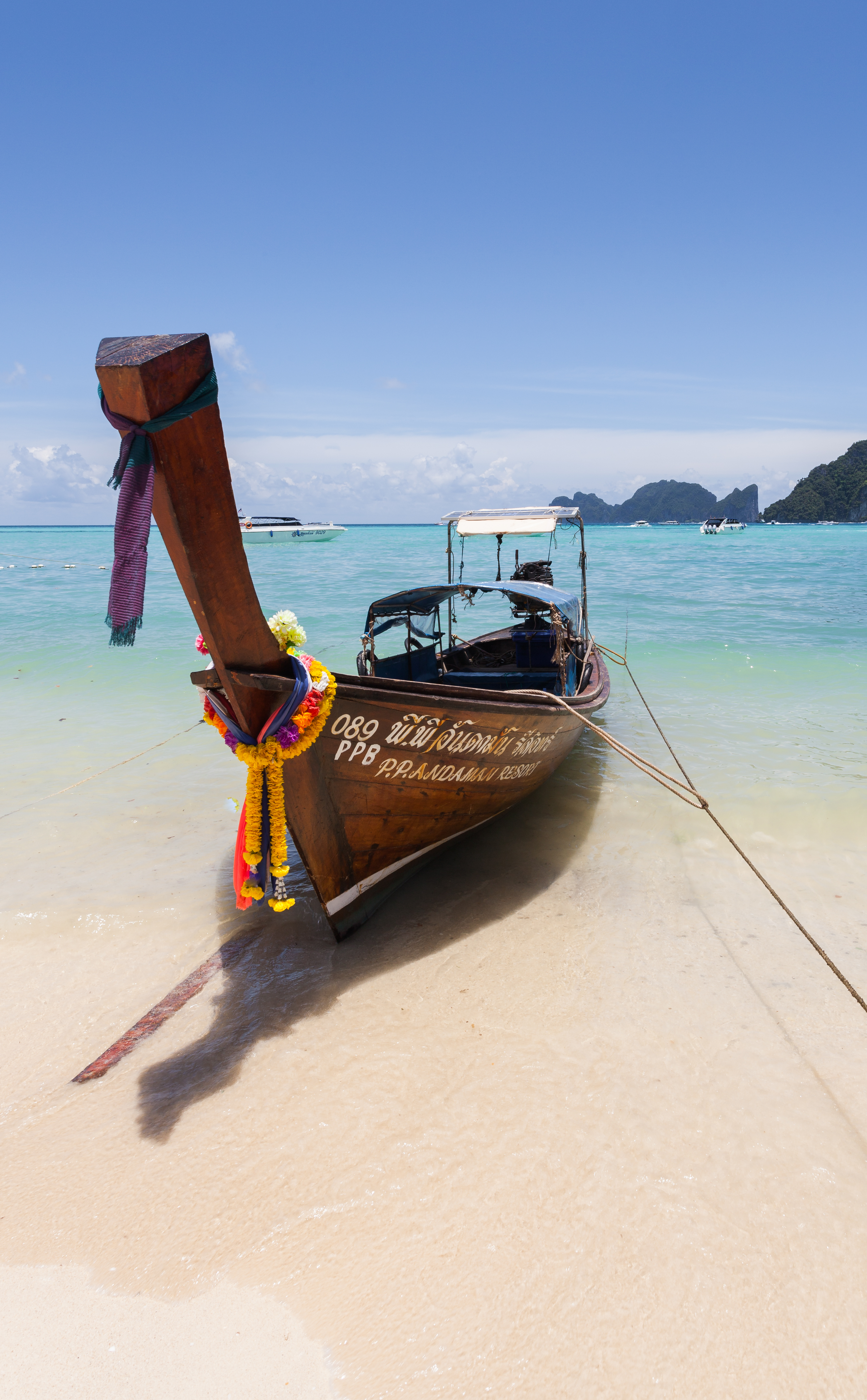
Long-tail boat on beach, Phi Phi Don

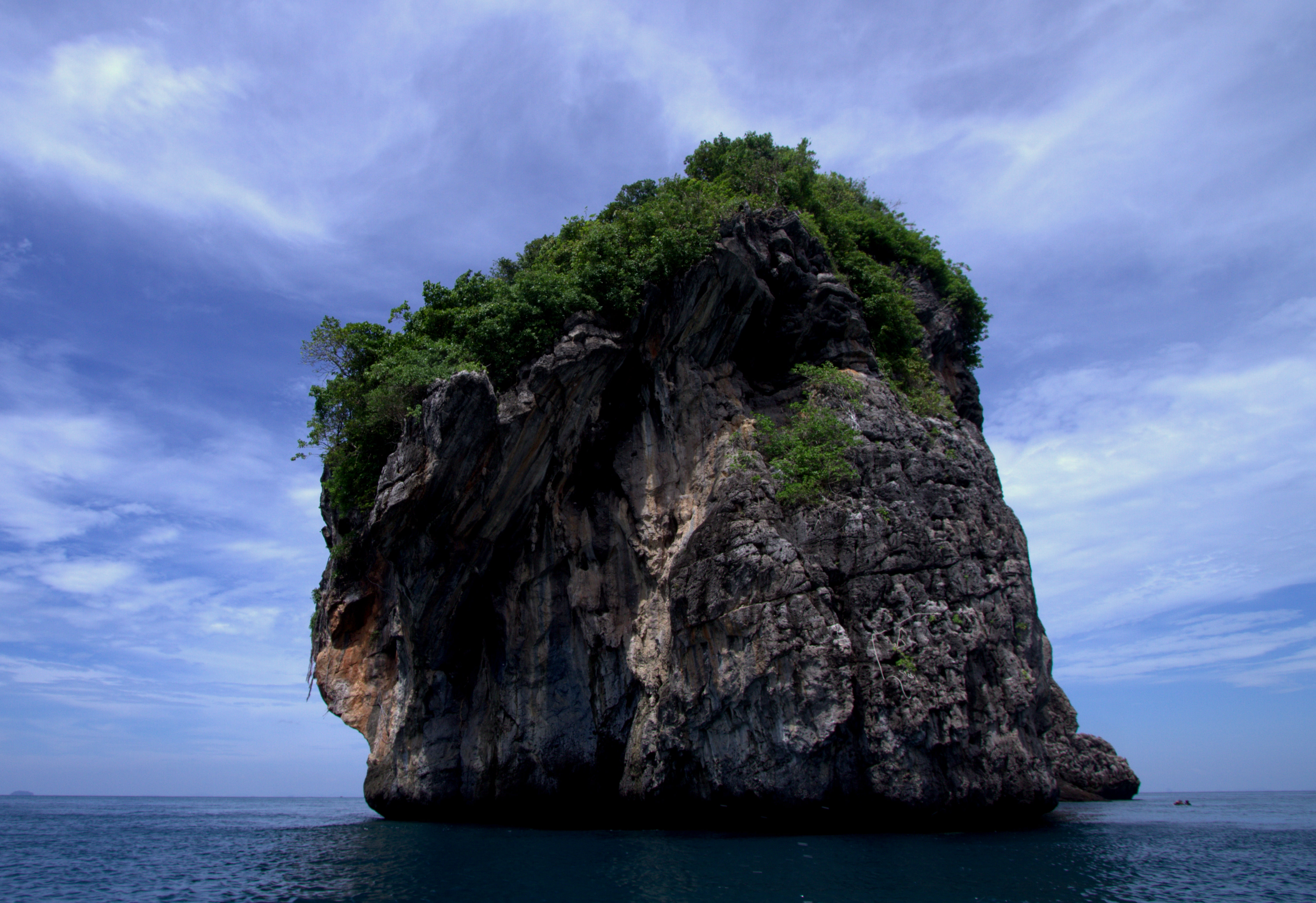
Nui Bay, Phi Phi Don

Most of the Phi Phi Islands are in a protected marine reserve, part of Hat Noppharat Thara-Mu Ko Phi Phi National Park. But parts of Phi Phi Don are outside the park's jurisdiction and are under the jurisdiction of and funded by the Ao Nang Tambon Administrative Organisation (TAO). Its budget is based on the number of permanent, registered residents and does not account for visitors. The island has very few documented residents. Most who service the tourist trade are registered residents elsewhere in Thailand. The number of residents, permanent and temporary, is dwarfed by the number of visitors. Thus, the Ao Nang TAO allocates only about 170 million baht per year to the Phi Phis. Underfunding has contributed to serious environmental issues.

=== Solid waste ===
The Phi Phi Islands in 2014 produced an average of 25 tonnes of solid waste a day, jumping to 40 tonnes during the high season that runs roughly from November to April. All tourists arriving on the island pay a 20 baht fee at Ton Sai Pier to assist in "keeping Ko Phi Phi clean". The money, up to 20,000 baht per day (2014), is then paid to a private company to haul roughly 20 tonnes of rubbish from the island to Krabi for disposal. In 2014, the Ao Nang TAO paid 600,000 baht per month for this service. Collections from visitors amount to only about a third of the sum needed to effectively handle the solid waste generated.

=== Water: potable and waste ===
According to a research team from Kasetsart University's Faculty of Engineering, Phi Phi Don suffers from a severe shortage of clean freshwater. The problem stems from a period of low rainfall coinciding with the high tourist season, exacerbated by improper wastewater management. During the driest period of the year, from November to April, the island is packed with tourists, which spikes water demand. There is no rainfall to replenish the two freshwater ponds, which are the only sources of piped water on the island. The limited supply drives up the cost of piped water, in turn driving businesses to drill wells to tap groundwater. This lowers the water table. Lowering aquifer water levels allows seawater to encroach on groundwater. In addition, the island's water treatment plant cannot handle the volume of wastewater generated, so excess untreated wastewater is discharged into the sea, contaminating groundwater. Short of substantial infrastructure investment, the lead Kasetsart researcher recommended that the number of visitors be capped at the carrying capacity of the island: 12,000 to 27,000 people per day. Her recommendation was prefigured in 2015 by a member of Thailand's National Reform Council, who called Phi Phi a "slum" and recommended capping tourist numbers.

== See also ==
- List of islands of Thailand
