= Destination Air Shuttle =

Thai airline

- Founded: 2007
- Commenced operations: 2009
- Operating bases: Phuket International Airport, Thailand
- Hubs: Phi Phi Island Airport, Thailand
- Parent company: Destination Air
- Headquarters: Phuket, Thailand
- Key people: Pat James (managing director); Stiphan Beher (managing director)

Destination Air Shuttle was an airline based in Phuket, Thailand. It operated floatplane services from Phuket and the Phi Phi Islands to other island destinations, and to resorts on the Thai mainland, and tours with Jiab.

== History ==
The airline was established in 2007 and was wholly owned by Destination Air, which was owned by Destination Properties. Pat James served as Managing Director from inception through to mid-2008. In June, 2008 Stiphan Beher, General Manager for operations in Phuket, Thailand, for parent company, Destination Properties, assumed the top position in an effort to revamp the under-performing airline. Beher subsequently entered negotiations with Thai Airways for an interline agreement, which never happened. The airline ceased operations in 2009.
