= Phi Phi Islands =

Thai archipelago in the Strait of Malacca

Native name: หมู่เกาะพีพี
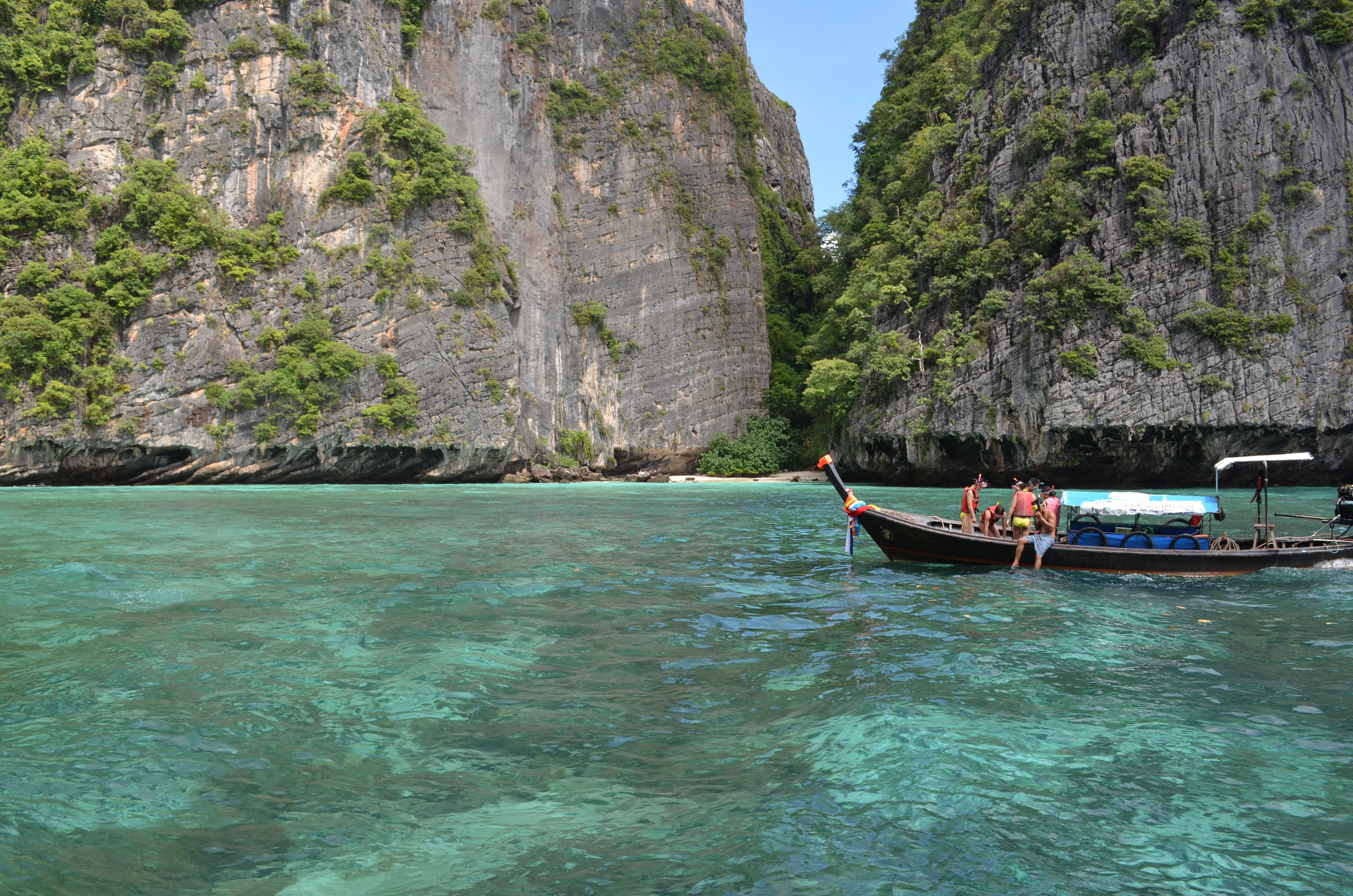
- Beach surrounded by limestone cliffs, typical of the islands
- Interactive map of Phi Phi Islands

Geography
- Location: Strait of Malacca
- Coordinates: 7°44′00″N 98°46′00″E
- Archipelago: Phi Phi Islands
- Total islands: 6
- Major islands: Ko Phi Phi Don and Ko Phi Phi Le
- Area: 12.06 km^{2} (4.66 sq mi)

Administration
- Thailand
- Province: Krabi
- District: Mueang Krabi
- Tambon: Ao Nang
- Largest village: Ban Ko Phi Phi

Demographics
- Population: 2,500 (2018)
- Languages: Thai, Southern Thai, Urak Lawoi
- Ethnic groups: Urak Lawoi

Additional information
- Time zone: ICT (UTC+7)
- Postal code: 81210

The Phi Phi Islands (Thai: หมู่เกาะพีพี, RTGS: Mu Ko Phiphi, pronounced [mùː kɔ̀ʔ pʰīː.pʰīː]) are an island group in Thailand located in the Strait of Malacca between the large island of Phuket and the Straitscoast in the Krabi Province. The islands are administratively part of Krabi Province. Ko Phi Phi Don (Thai: เกาะพีพีดอน, RTGS: Ko Phiphi Don) (ko Thai: เกาะ 'island') is the largest and most populated island of the group, although the beaches of the second largest island, Ko Phi Phi Le (Thai: เกาะพีพีเล, RTGS: Ko Phiphi Le) are visited by many people as well. The rest of the islands in the group, including Bida Nok, Bida Nai, and Ko Mai Phai, are not much more than large limestone rocks jutting out of the sea. The islands are reachable by ferries, speedboats or long-tail boats, most often from Krabi town or from ports in Phuket Province.

Phi Phi Don was initially populated by Thai Malay fishermen during the late-1940s, and later became a coconut plantation. The resident Thai population of Phi Phi Don remains more than 80 percent Muslim. The current population however—if counting transient workers—is more Buddhist than Muslim. The resident population is between 2,000 and 3,000 people (2018).

The islands came to worldwide prominence when Ko Phi Phi Le was used as a location for the 2000 British-American film The Beach. This attracted criticism, with claims that the film company had damaged the island's environment—the producers supposedly bulldozed beach areas and planted palm trees to make it better resemble descriptions in the book, an accusation the filmmakers contest. An increase in tourism was attributed to the film's release, which resulted in increased environmental degradation. Phi Phi Le is home to the "Viking Cave", where there is a thriving industry harvesting edible bird's nests.

Ko Phi Phi was devastated by the Indian Ocean tsunami of December 2004, when nearly all of the island's infrastructure was destroyed.

== Etymology ==
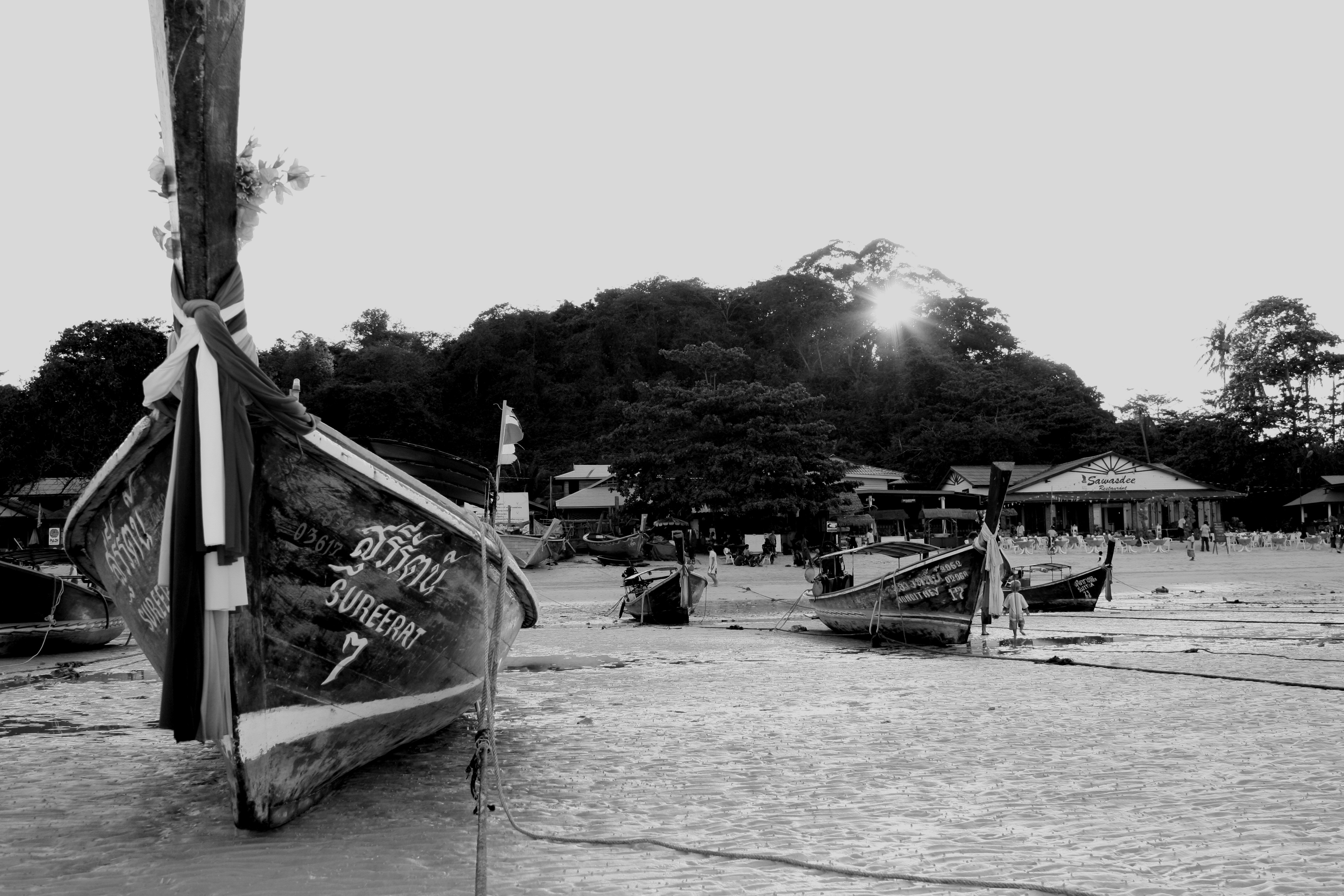
Gypsy boat, Ko Phi Phi

The name Phi Phi (pronounced "phi-phi") originates from Malay. The original name for the islands was Pulau Api-Api ('the fiery isle'). The name refers to the Pokok Api-Api, or "fiery tree" (grey mangrove) which is found on the islands.

== Geography ==
There are six islands in the group known as Phi Phi. They lie 46 kilometres (29 miles) southeast of Phuket and are part of Hat Noppharat Thara–Mu Ko Phi Phi National Park. The national park covers an area of 242,437 rai (38,789.9 ha; 95,852 acres). which is home to an abundance of corals and marine life. There are limestone mountains with cliffs, caves, and long white sandy beaches.

Phi Phi Don and Phi Phi Le are the largest and best-known islands. Phi Phi Don is 10.27 square kilometres (3.97 square miles): 8 kilometres (5.0 miles) in length and 3.5 kilometres (2.2 miles) wide. Phi Phi Le is 1.27 square kilometres (0.49 square miles). In total, the islands occupy 12.06 square kilometres (4.66 square miles).

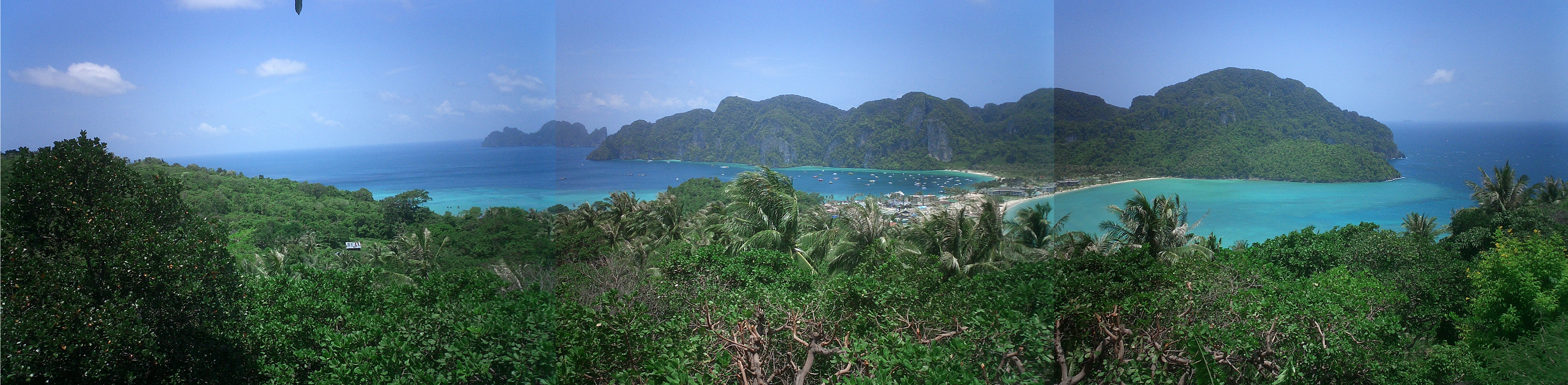
Ko Phi Phi Don is the largest of the islands in the Phi Phi archipelago
Ko Phi Phi Le
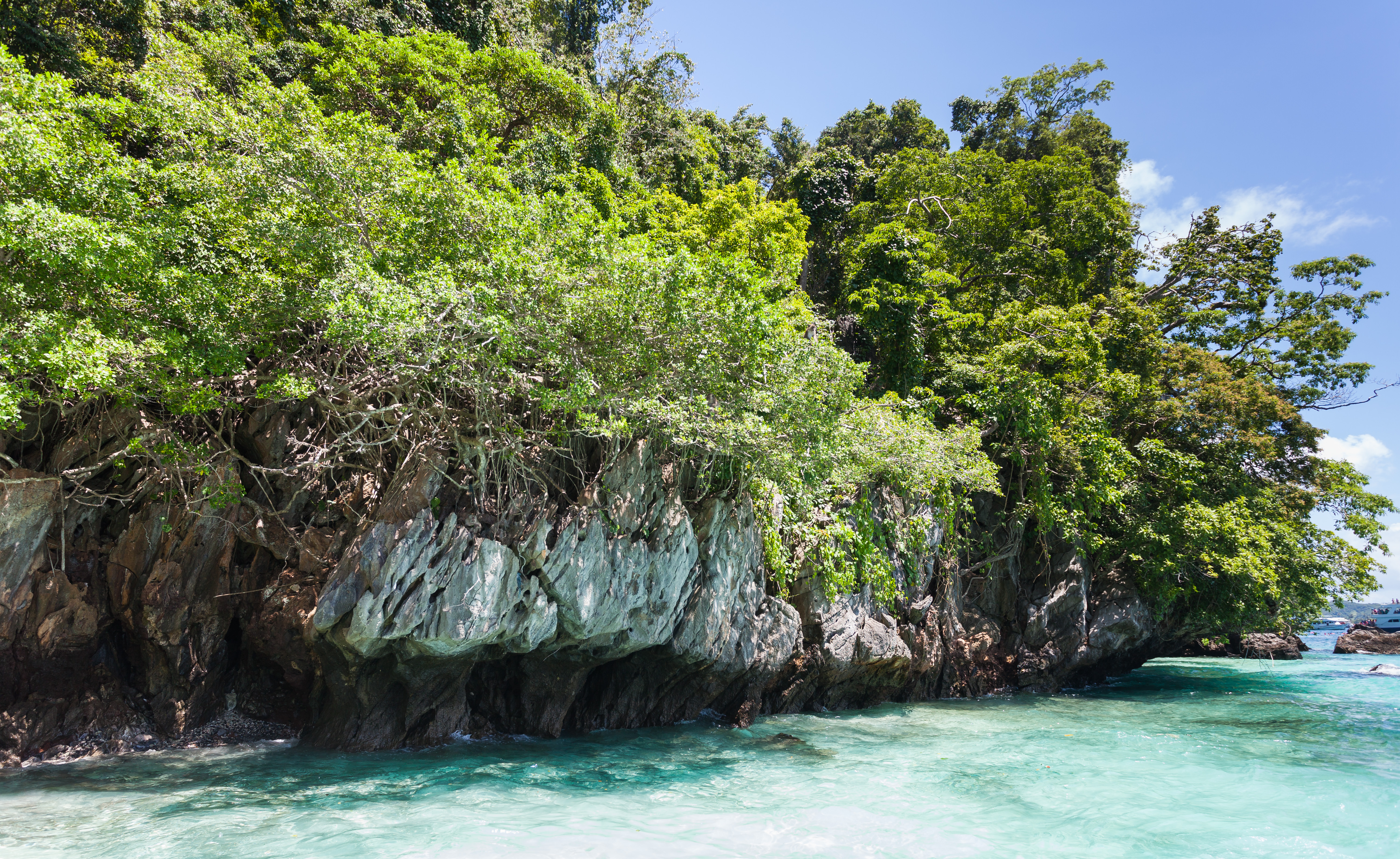

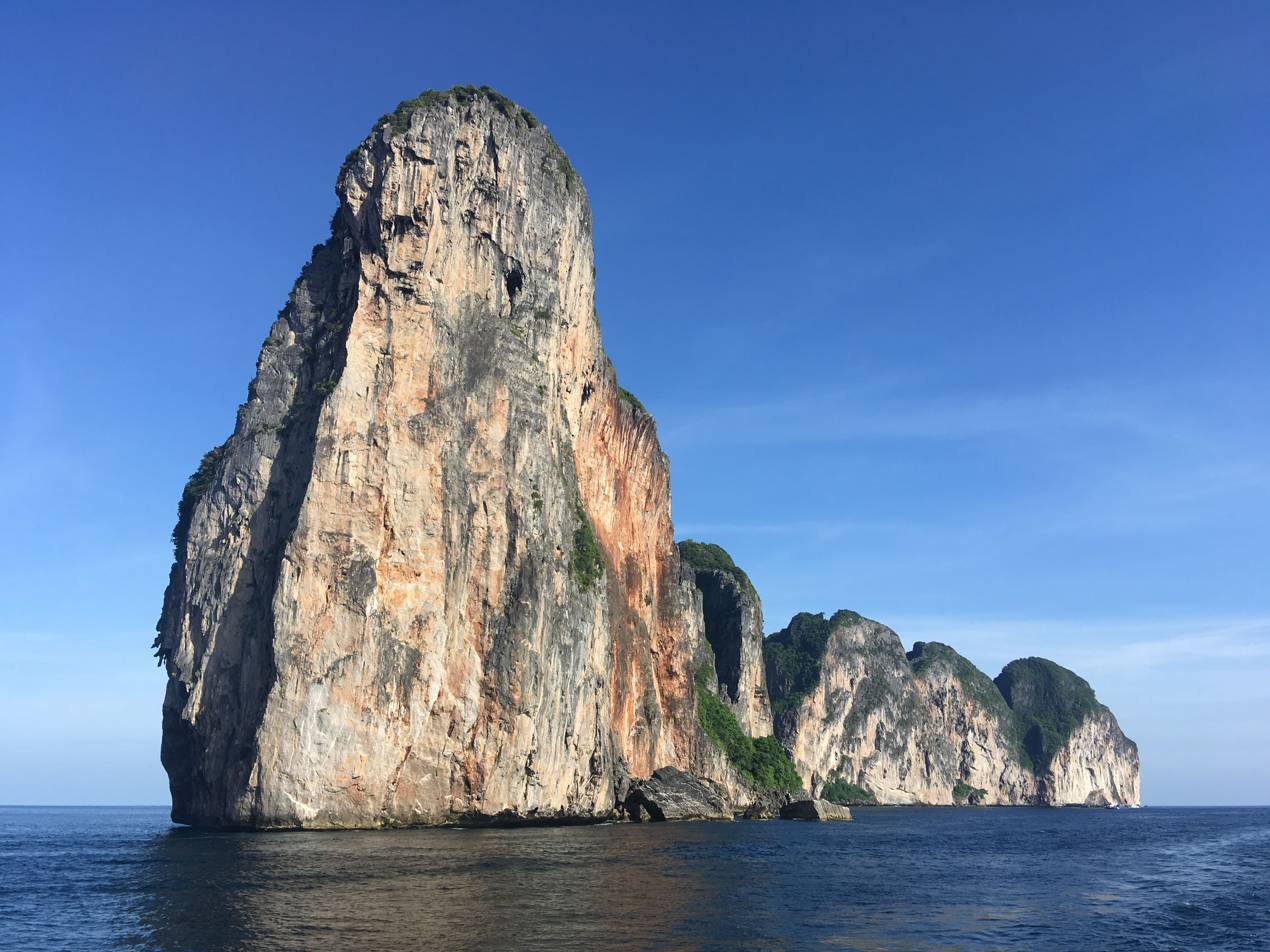
View of the northern part of Ko Phi Phi Le

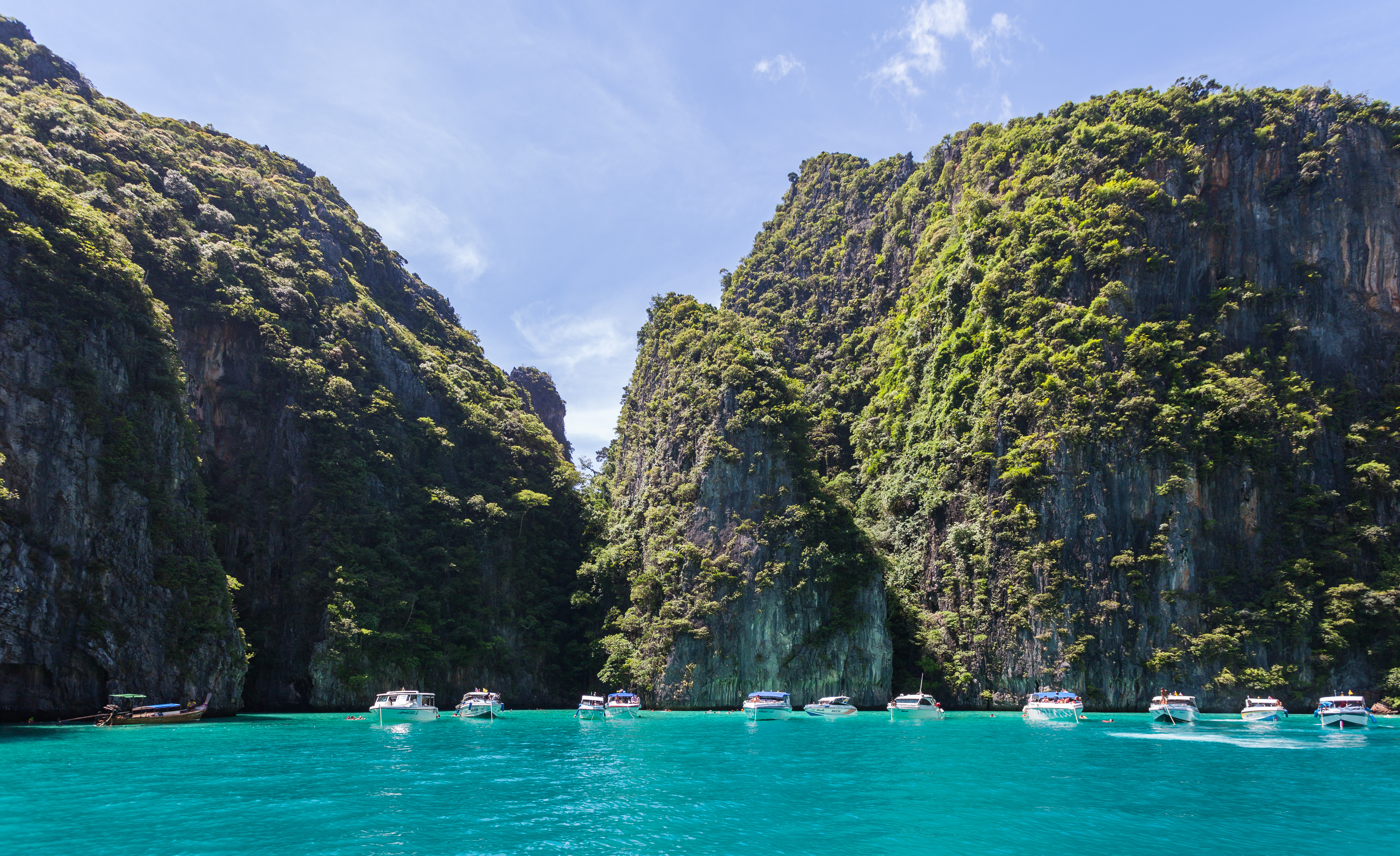
Phi Phi Le Island

Nr	Island	Area (km^{2})
1	Ko Phi Phi Don	10.273
2	Ko Phi Phi Le	1.275
3	Ko Mai Phai	0.265
4	Ko Yung	0.210
5	Ko Bida Nok	0.027
6	Ko Bida Nai	0.013
Total		12.063

== Administration ==
Phi Phi Islands

There are two administrative villages on Ko Phi Phi under the administration of the Ao Nang sub-district, Mueang Krabi District, Krabi Province. There are nine settlements under these two villages.

The villages are:

- Laem Thong (บ้านแหลมตง, Mu 8, between 300 and 500 people)

- Ban Ko Mai Phai
- Ban Laem Tong
- Ao Loh Bakhao
- Ao Lana

- Ko Phi Phi (บ้านเกาะพีพี, Mu 7, between 1,500 - 2,000 people)

- Ao Maya (about 10 people, mostly in the ranger station)
- Ton Sai, the capital and largest settlement
- Hat Yao
- Ao Lodalum
- Laem Pho

== Climate ==
Hat Noppharat Thara–Mu Ko Phi Phi National Park is influenced by tropical monsoon winds. There are two seasons: the rainy season from May till December and the hot season from January till April. Average temperature ranges between 17–37 °C (63–99 °F). Average rainfall per year is about 2,231 millimetres (87.8 inches), with wettest month being July and the driest February.

== Transportation and communication ==
=== Roads ===
Since the re-building of Ko Phi Phi after the 2004 tsunami, paved roads now cover the vast majority of Ton Sai Bay and Loh Dalum Bay. All roads are for pedestrian use only with push carts used to transport goods and bags. The only permitted motor vehicles are reserved for emergency services. Bicycling is the most popular form of transport in Ton Sai.

=== Air ===
The nearest airport is Krabi which is in the same province as the Phi Phi Islands. Phuket and Trang airports are also nearby. Phuket has a direct connection by road and boat. There is a road and boat connection from Trang to Phi Phi via Koh Lanta but services only operate between November and March.

=== Ferry ===
There are frequent ferry boats to Ko Phi Phi from Phuket, Ko Lanta, and Krabi.

There is a large modern deep water government pier on Tonsai Bay, Phi Phi Don Village, completed in late-2009.

== Tourism ==
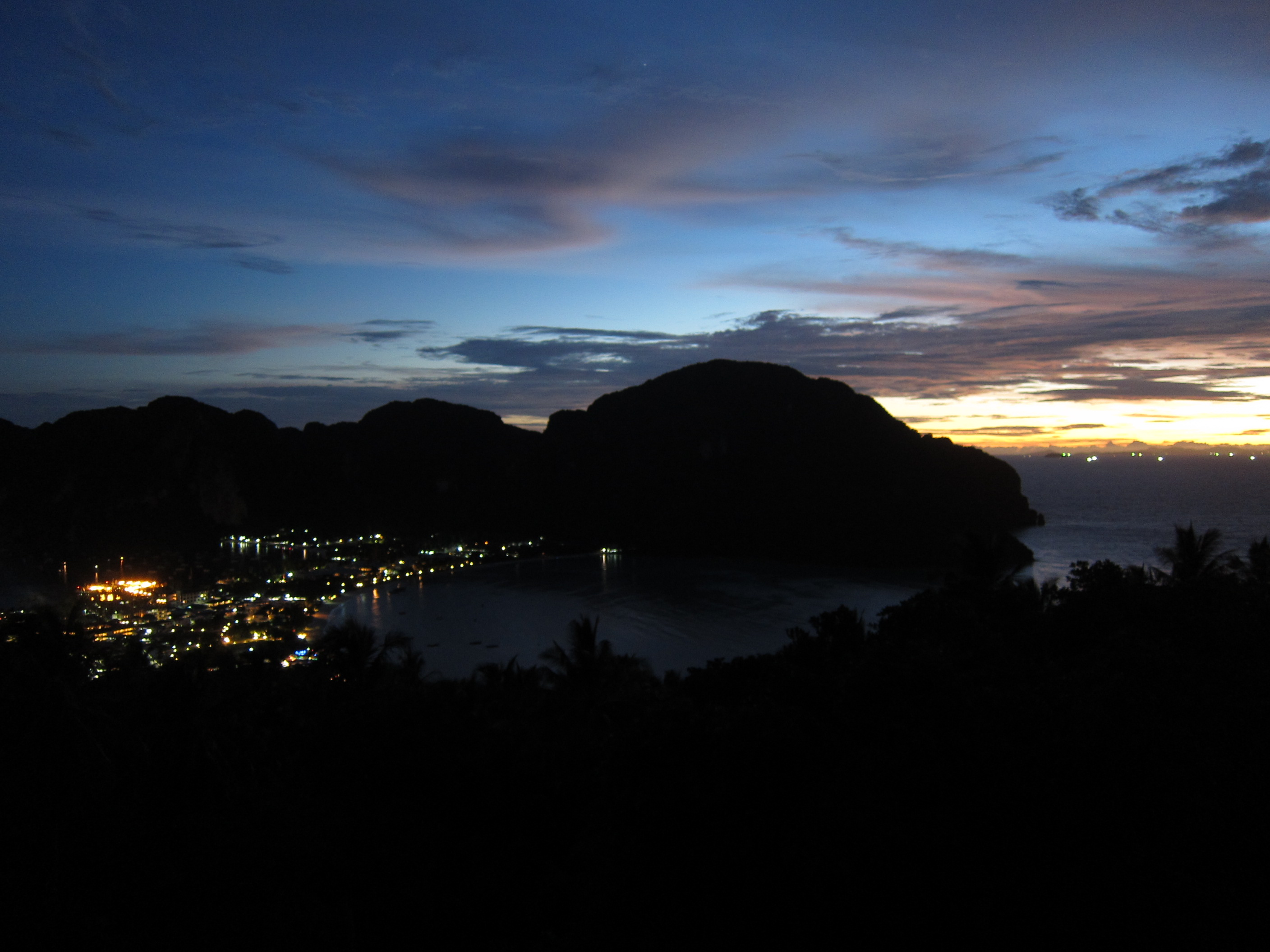
Sunset, Ko Phi Phi Don

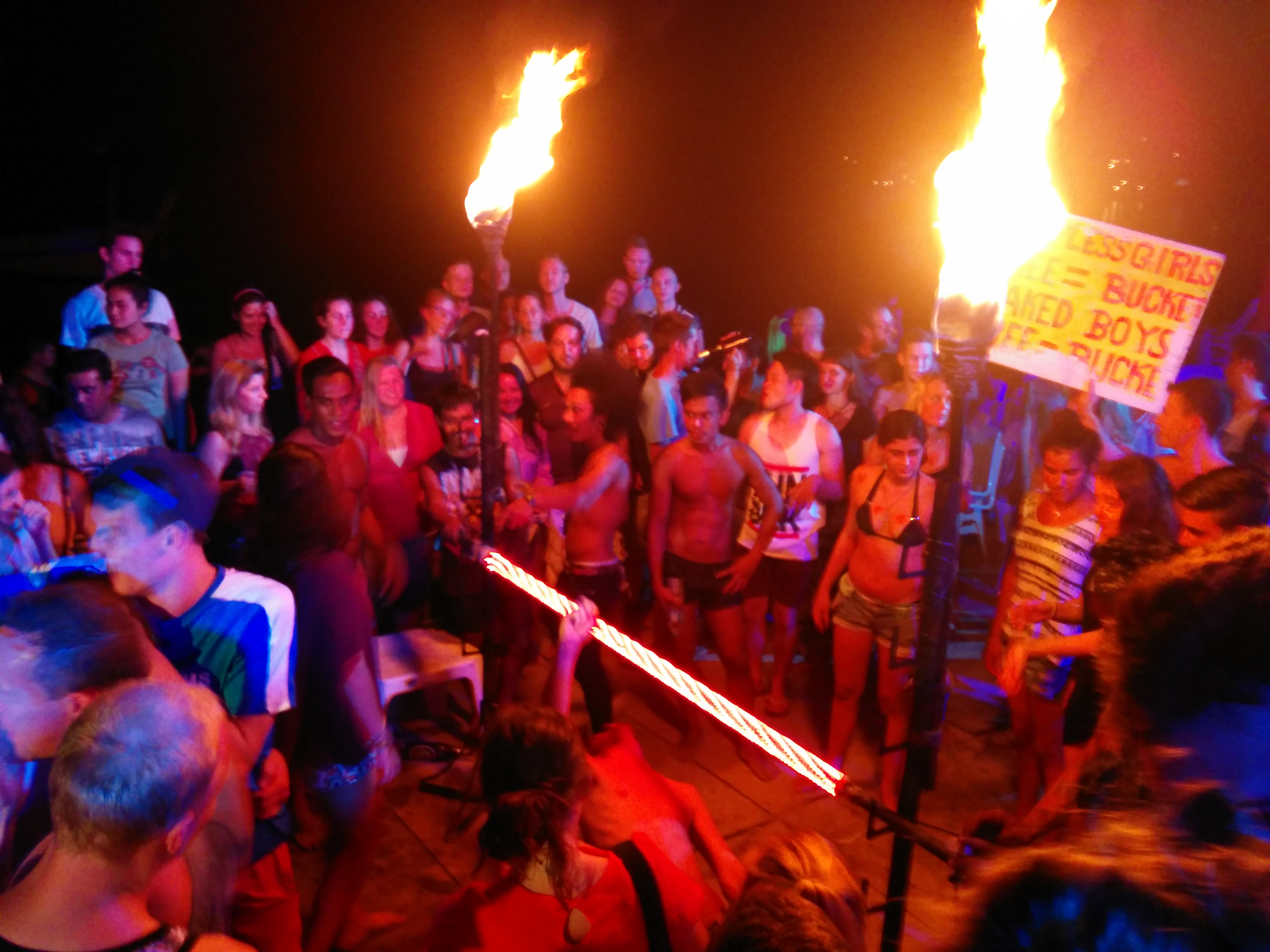
Phi Phi party

The islands feature beaches and clear water, and the natural environment is protected by national park status. At the beginning of the year 1992, the government began imposing a 5 baht fee on each visitor to the islands, in order to pay the laborers who collect and burn refuse and who also help "to provide waterway transportation and security for tourists". Since the release of the movie The Beach in 2000, which was partly filmed on Ko Phi Phi Le, tourism to the islands has exploded.

Phi Phi Le's Maya Bay was closed to tourists from June 2018 until January 2022, to enable the ecosystem to recover.

== Medical ==
There is a small government hospital on Phi Phi Island, for emergencies. Its primary purpose is to stabilize emergencies and evacuate to a Krabi hospital by sea. It is between the Phi Phi Cabana Hotel and the Ton Sai Towers, about a 5–7 minute walk from the main pier. There are two Private Hospitals, The World Med Center is on Tonsai Bay, and a second smaller branch is near Loh Dalum Beach.

== 2004 tsunami ==
On 26 December 2004, much of the inhabited part of Phi Phi Don was devastated by the 2004 Indian Ocean earthquake and tsunami. The island's main village, Ton Sai (Banyan Tree, Thai: ต้นไทร), is built on a sandy isthmus between the island's two long, tall limestone ridges. On both sides of Ton Sai are semicircular bays lined with beaches. The isthmus rises less than two metres (6.6 feet) above sea level.

Shortly after 10:00 on 26 December, the water from both bays receded. When the tsunami hit, at 10:37, it did so from both bays, and met in the middle of the isthmus. The wave that came into Ton Sai Bay was three metres (9.8 feet) high. The wave that came into Loh Dalum Bay was 6.5 metres (21 feet) high. The force of the larger wave from Loh Dalum Bay pushed the tsunami and also breached low-lying areas in the limestone karsts, passing from Laa Naa Bay to Bakhao Bay, and at Laem Thong (Sea Gypsy Village), where 11 people died. Apart from these breaches, the east side of the island experienced only flooding and strong currents. A tsunami memorial was built to honor the deceased but has since been removed for the building of a new hotel in 2015.

At the time of the tsunami, the island had an estimated 10,000 occupants, including tourists.

== Post-tsunami reconstruction ==
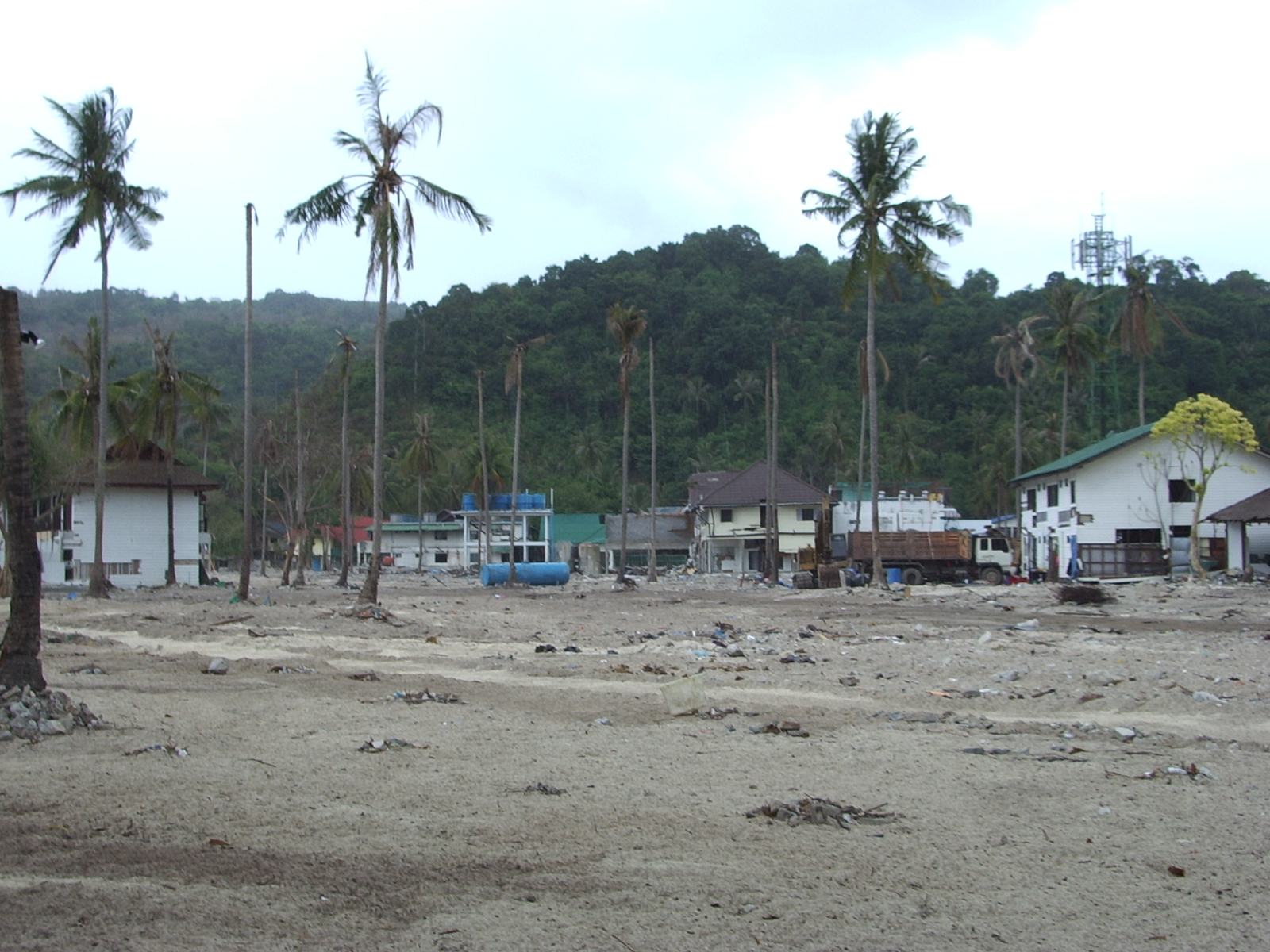
Ko Phi Phi Don, March 2005 in the aftermath of the tsunami.

After the tsunami, approximately 70% of the buildings on the island had been destroyed. By the end of July 2005, an estimated 850 bodies had been recovered, and an estimated 1,200 people were still missing. The total number of fatalities is unlikely to be known. Local tour guides cite the figure 4,000. Of Phi Phi Don residents, 104 surviving children had lost one or both parents.

In the immediate aftermath of the disaster, the permanent residents were housed in a refugee camp at Nong Kok in Krabi Province.

On 6 January 2005, a former Dutch resident of Phi Phi, Emiel Kok, set up a voluntary organization, Help International Phi Phi ("HI Phi Phi"). HI Phi Phi recruited 68 Thai staff from the refugee camp, as well as transient backpacker volunteers (of whom more than 3,500 offered their assistance), and returned to the island to undertake clearing and rebuilding work. On 18 February 2005, a second organization, Phi Phi Dive Camp, was set up to remove the debris from the bays and coral reef, most of which was in Ton Sai Bay.

By the end of July 2005, 23,000 tonnes of debris had been removed from the island, of which 7,000 tonnes had been cleared by hand. "We try and do as much as possible by hand," said Kok, "that way we can search for passports and identification." The majority of buildings that were deemed fit for repair by government surveyors had been repaired, and 300 businesses had been restored. HI Phi Phi was nominated for a Time Magazine Heroes of Asia award.

As of 6 December 2005, nearly 1,500 hotel rooms were open, and a tsunami early-warning alarm system had been installed by the Thai government with the help of volunteers.

== Impact of mass tourism ==
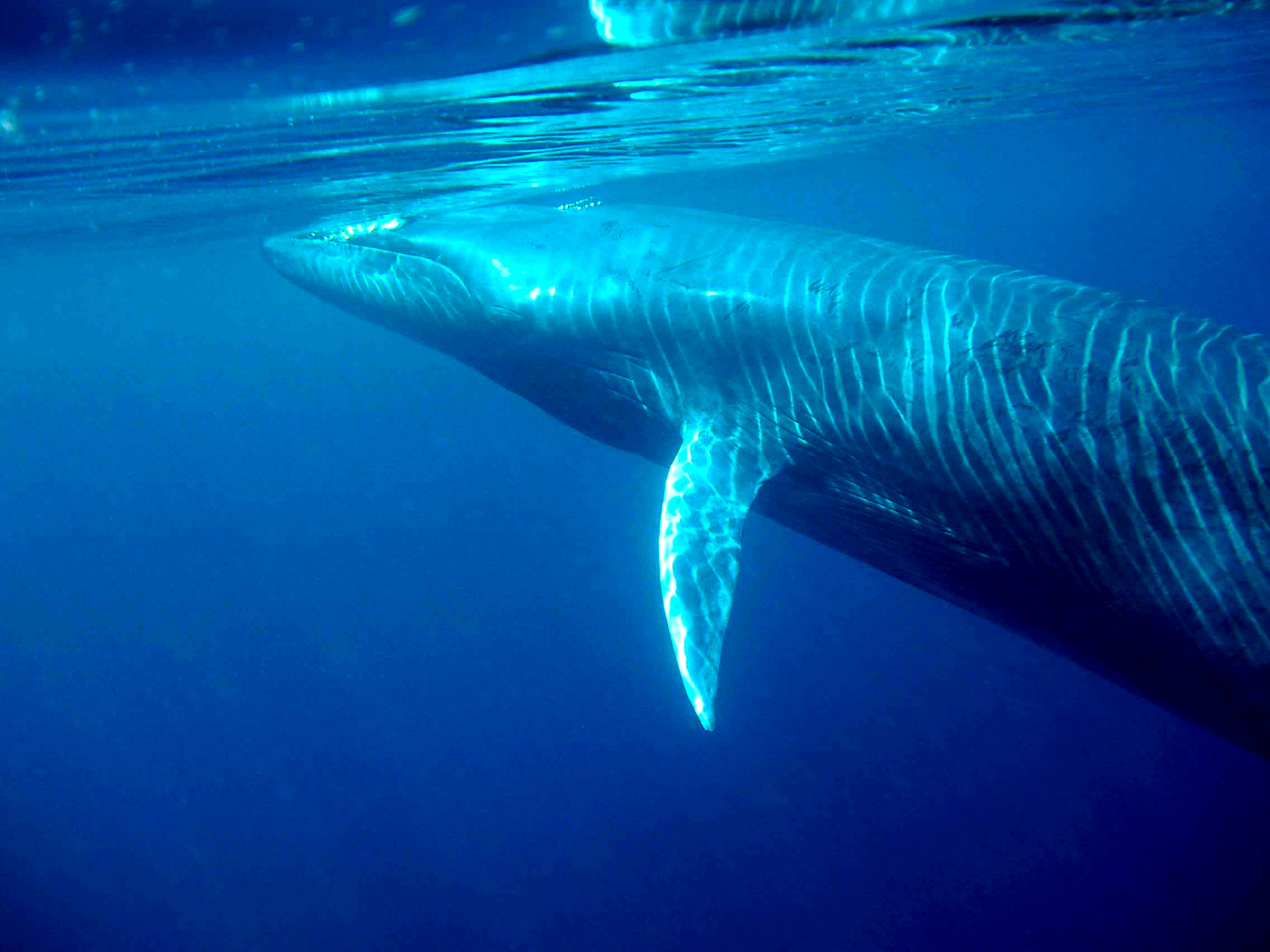
Bryde's whale swims off the islands

Since the tsunami, Phi Phi has come under greater threat from mass tourism. Dr Thon Thamrongnawasawat, an environmental activist and member of Thailand's National Reform Council, is campaigning to have Phi Phi tourist numbers capped before its natural beauty is completely destroyed. With southern Thailand attracting thousands more tourists every day, marine biology lecturer Dr Thon makes the point that the ecosystem is under threat and disappearing rapidly.

In 2014, tourists paid a 20-baht fee to fund waste removal, with 600,000 baht spent monthly on transporting trash to the mainland. However, Phi Phi lacked a wastewater treatment plant, and officials expressed doubt over businesses properly managing sewage. Budget constraints persisted as funding was based on residents, not visitors.

As of 2016, Phi Phi Island received over 1,000 tourists daily, generating 25–40 tonnes of waste, much of it untreated. 83% of wastewater was released into the ocean without treatment.

In June 2018, Maya Beach, made famous by Leonardo DiCaprio's 2000 film The Beach, was closed indefinitely to allow it to recover. The beach used to receive up to 5,000 tourists and 200 boats a day. It reopened January 1, 2022.

== Gallery ==
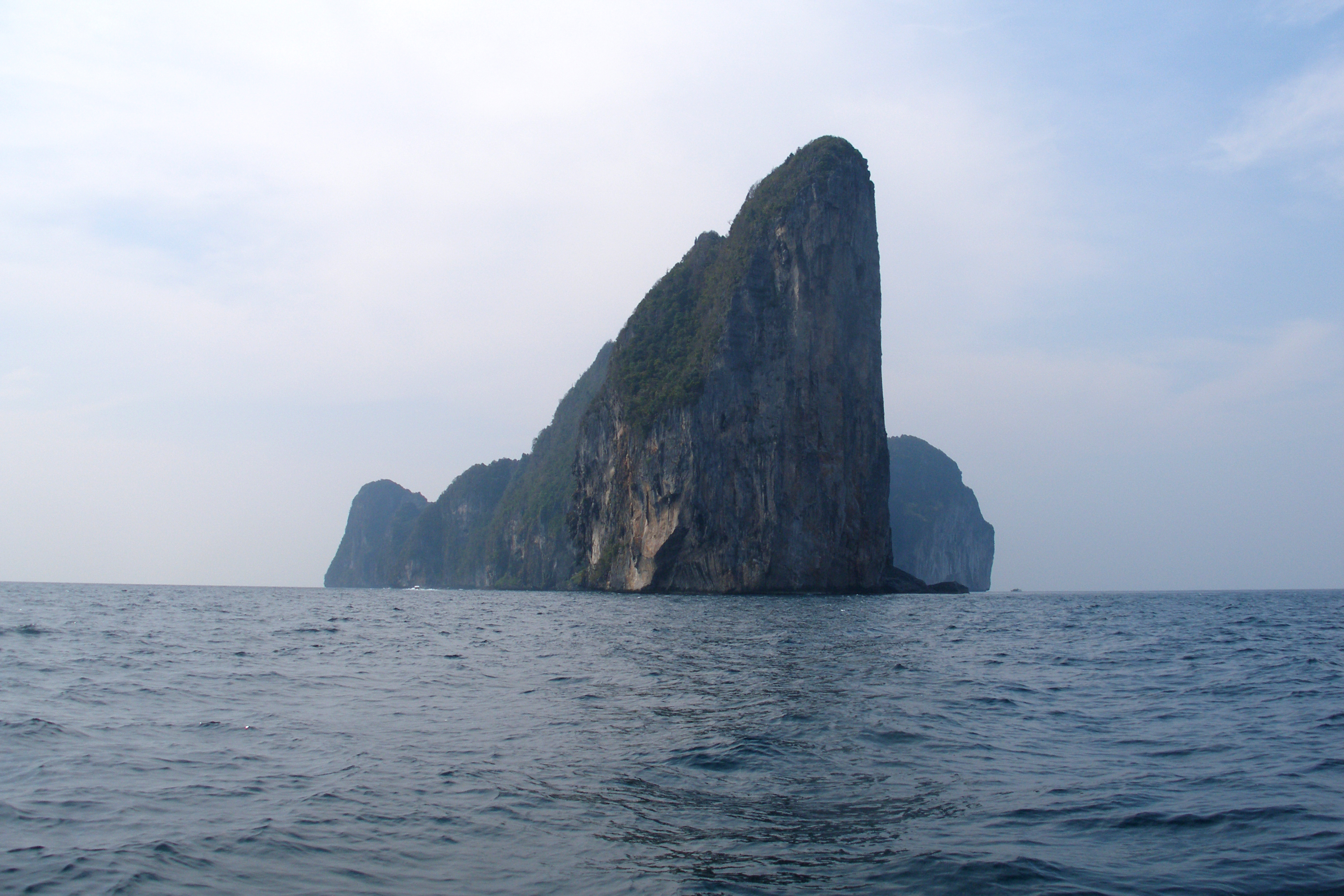
Vertical limestone cliffs of Ko Phi Phi Le

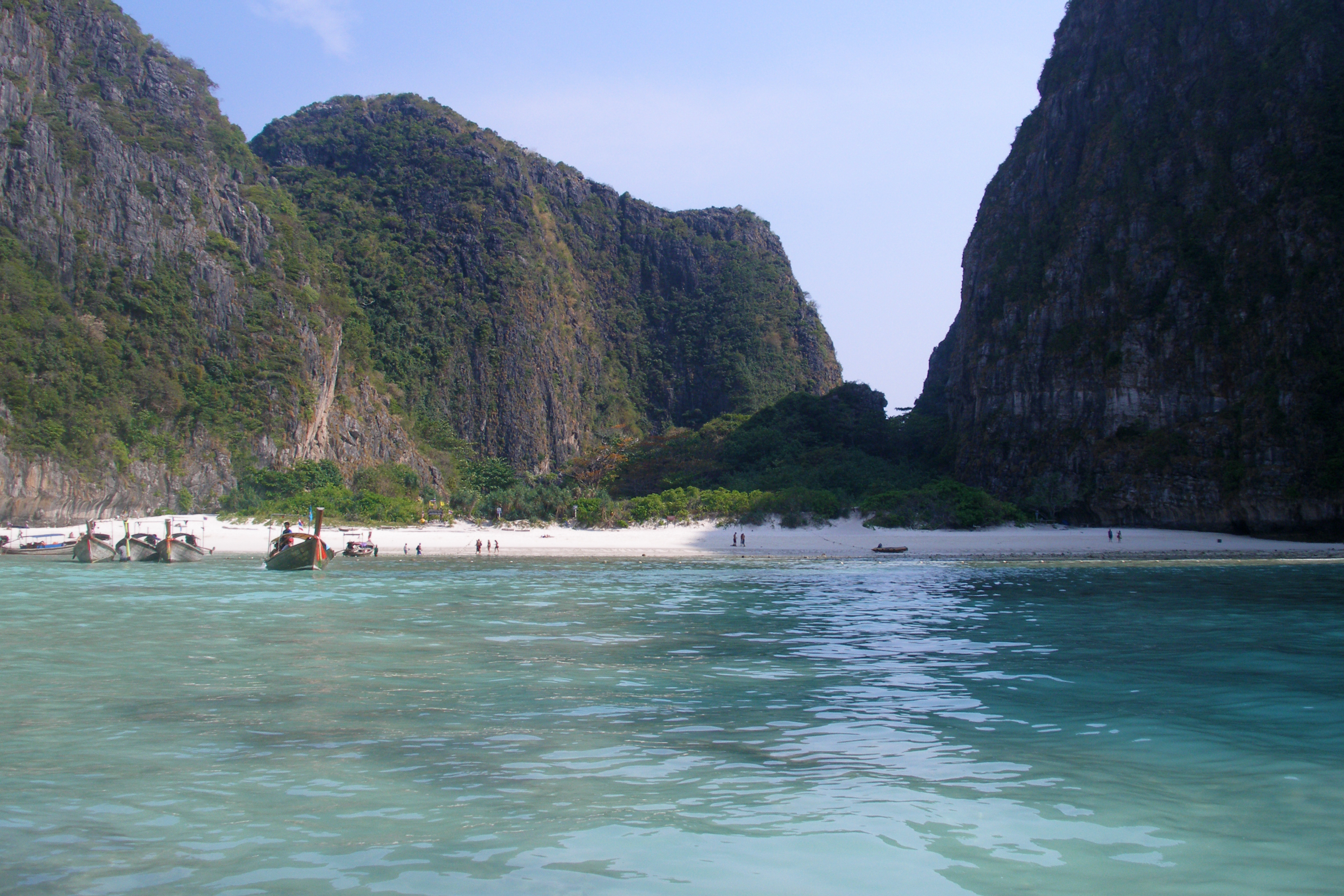
Maya Bay, Ko Phi Phi Le

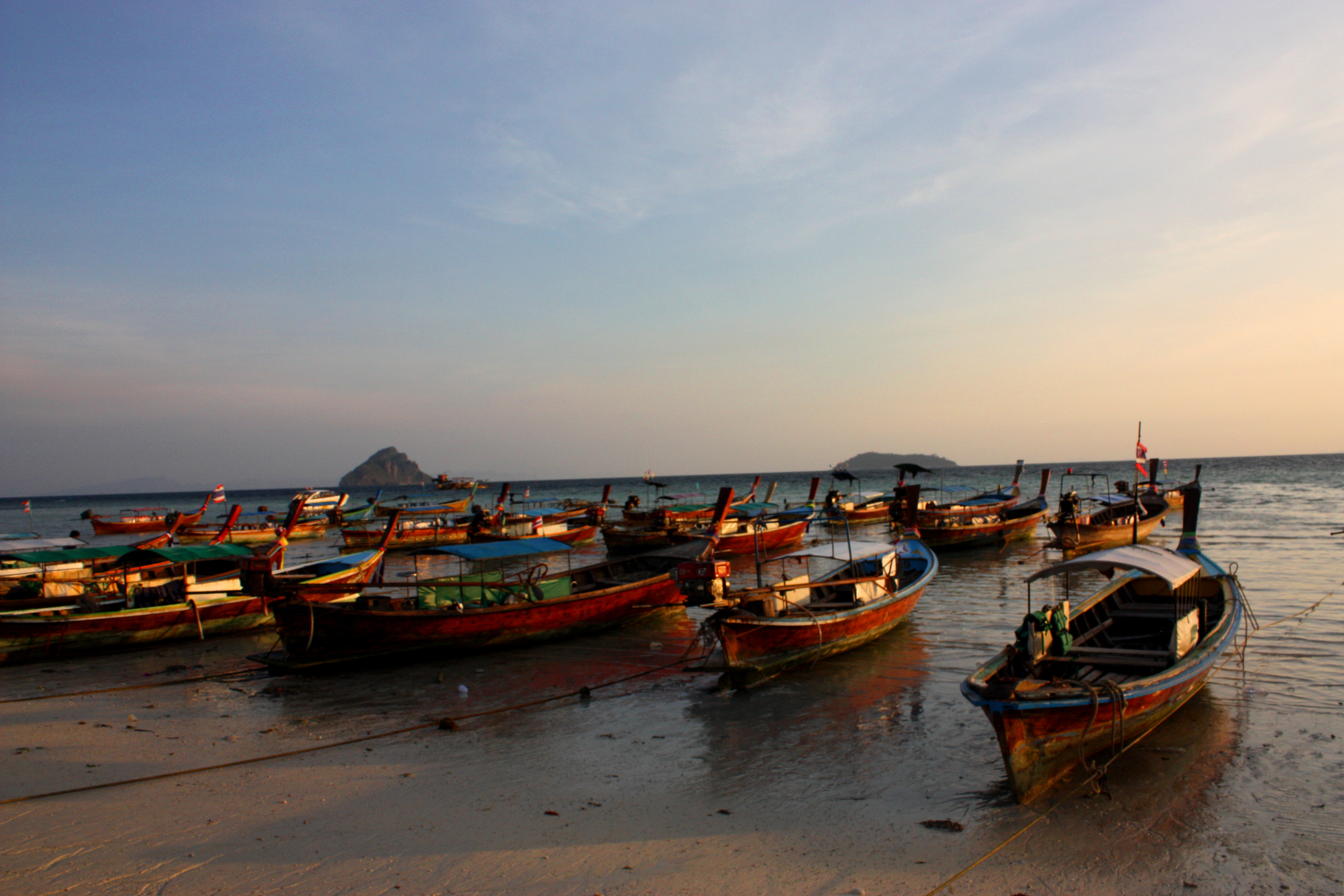
"Sea gypsy" boats, Ko Phi Phi

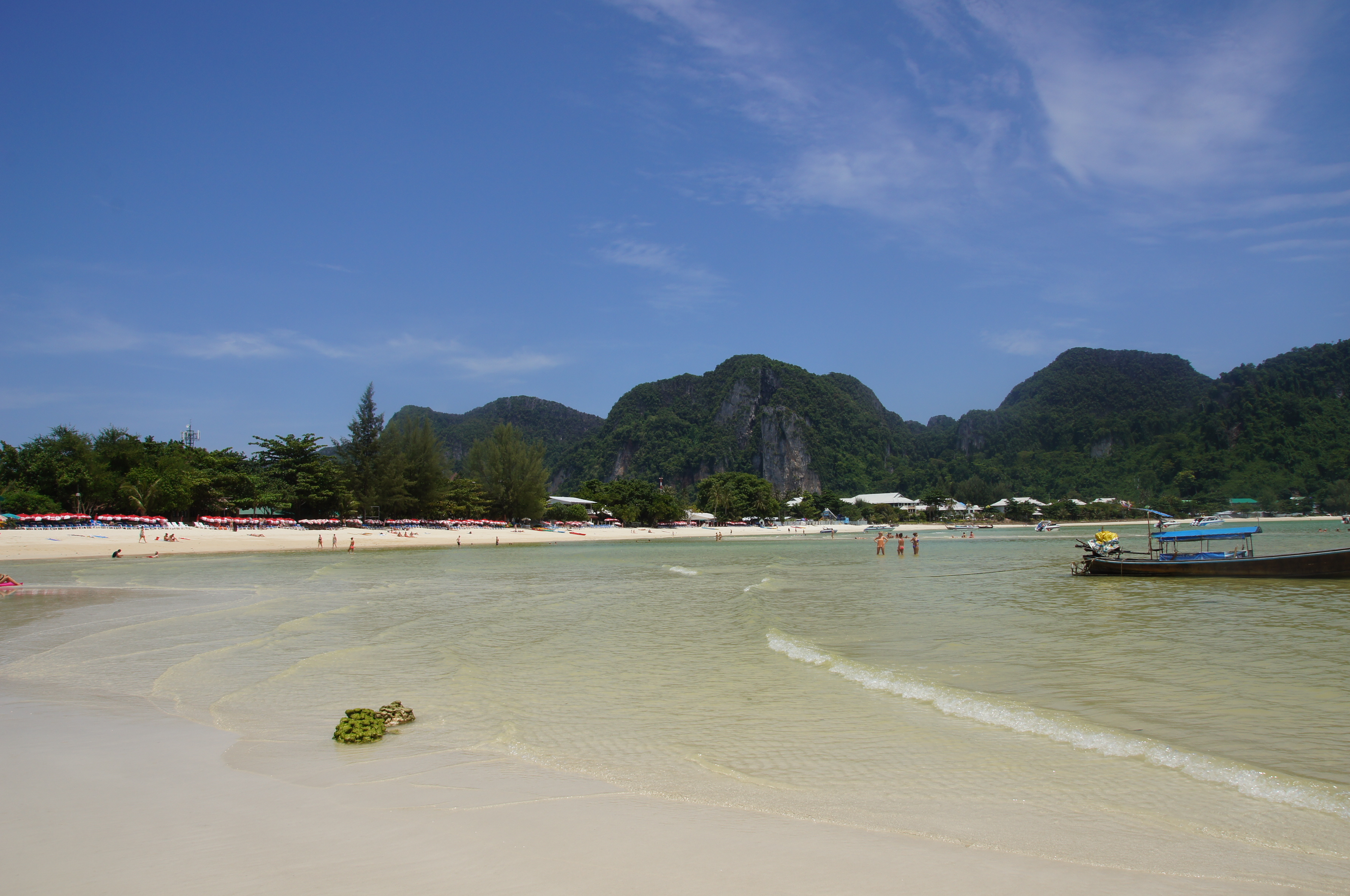
Ko Phi Phi Don beach

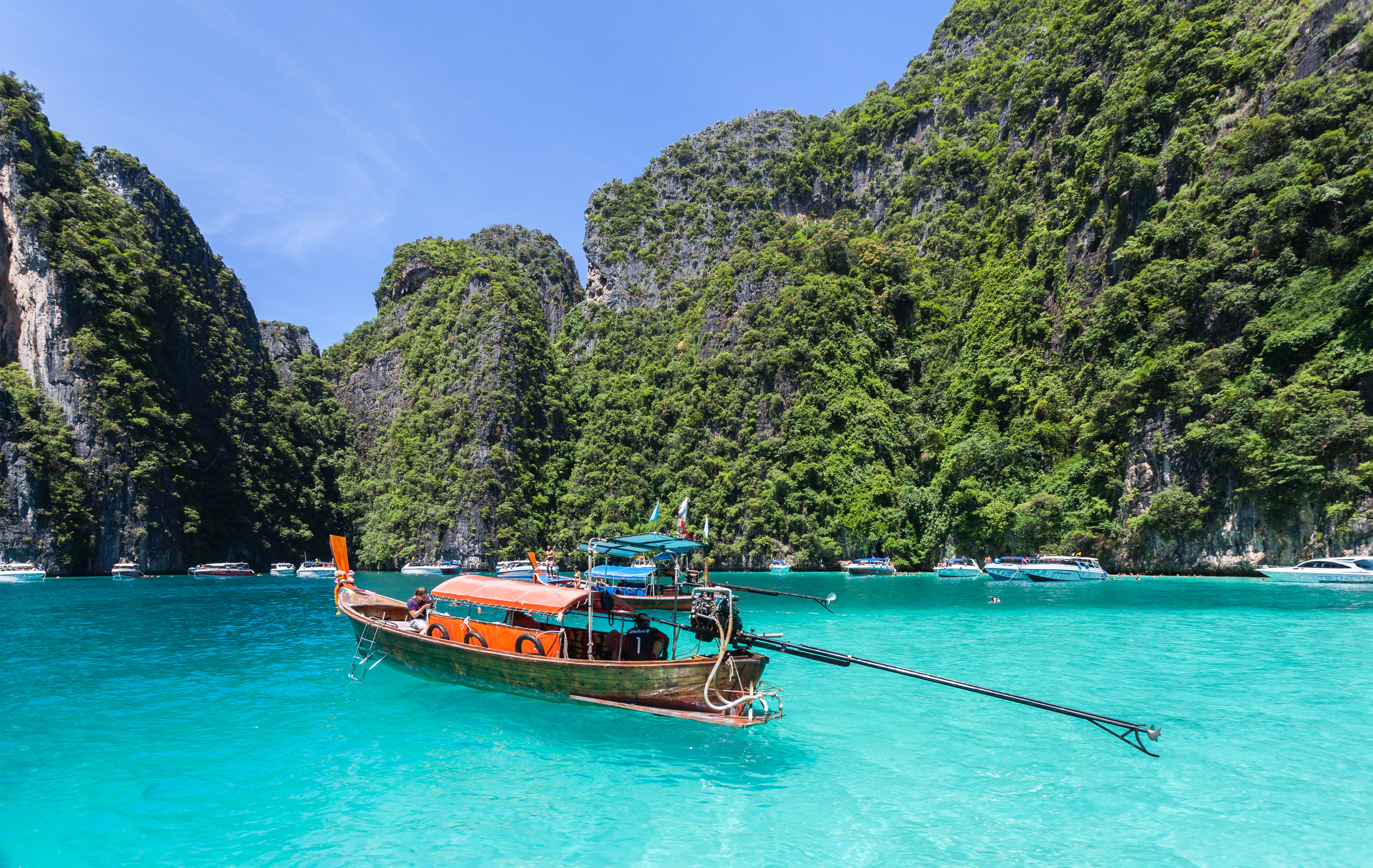
Long-tail boat on the shore of Ko Phi Phi Le

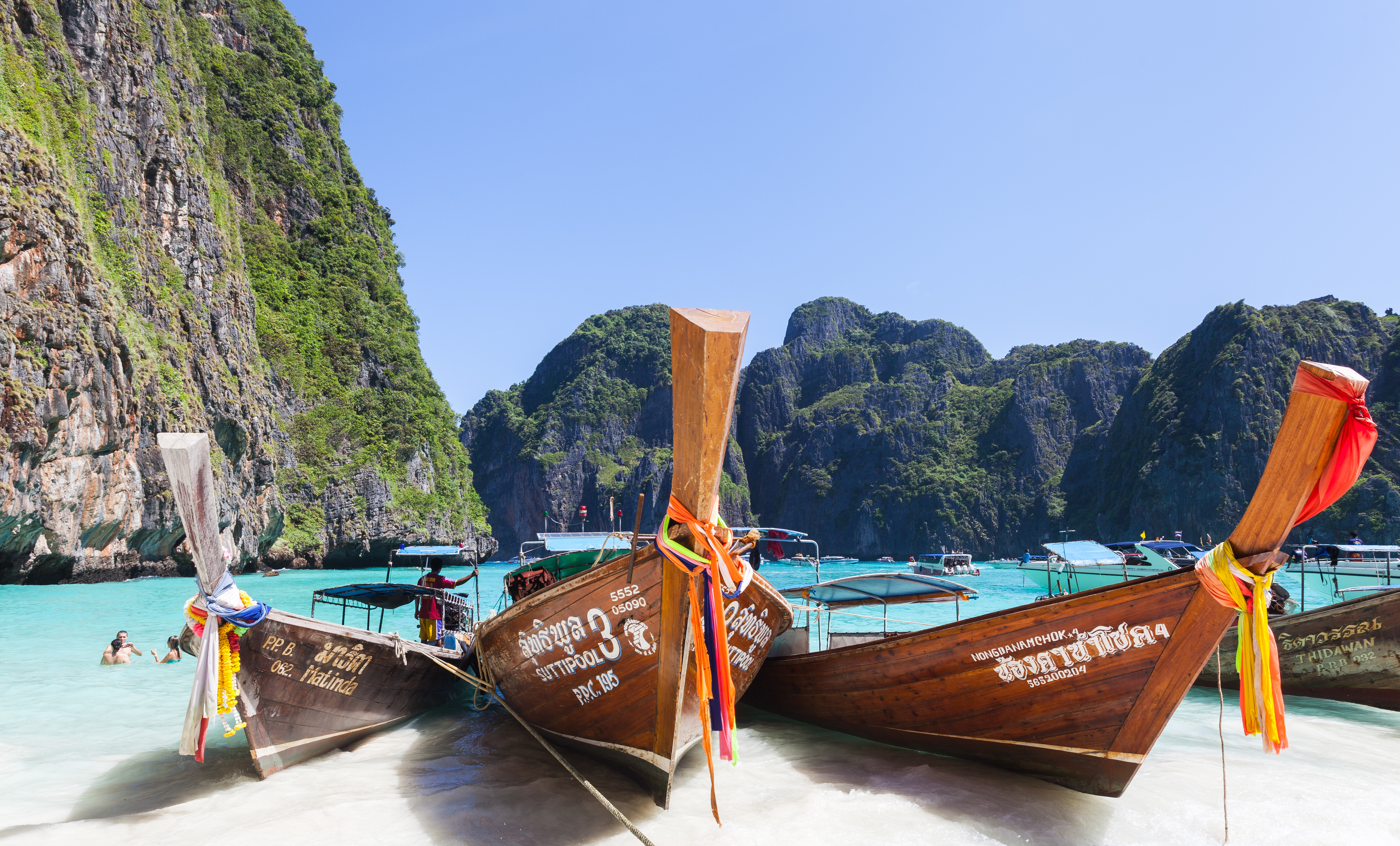
Longtail boats, Maya Beach

== See also ==
- List of islands of Thailand
- Setjetting
