= Thon Thamrongnawasawat =

- Born: Thon Thamrongnawasawat; 9 December 1966 (age 59)
- Occupations: Marine biologist, conservationist, writer, lecturer
- Known for: Environmental activist
- Title: Assistant Professor
- Spouse: Bunyarat Thamrongnawasawat

Thon Thamrongnawasawat (Thai: ธรณ์ ธำรงนาวาสวัสดิ์, born December 6, 1966) is a Thai oceanographer, marine biologist, environmentalist, science communicator, and writer.

== Biography and career ==
The son of Thaloeng Thamrongnawasawat, a former Permanent Secretary of the Ministry of Agriculture and Cooperatives, and the paternal grandson of Admiral Thawan Thamrongnawasawat, Thailand's 8th prime minister. He developed a fascination with the sea from an early age and wanted to become a scientist from the age of just two or three. He graduated with a degree in Marine Science from Chulalongkorn University (CU) and earned his PhD from James Cook University (JCU) in Australia. He currently serves as Deputy Dean of the Faculty of Fisheries at Kasetsart University (KU).

Known as a diver and writer who shares stories about the sea, with a particular focus on environmental issues, marine and nature conservation, and global climate change. He has also been instrumental in advocating for the temporary closure of bays and popular tourist beaches to allow marine ecosystems and nature to recover. These include Ao Maya, Ko Tachai, and the Pak Bara deep-sea port project in Satun, which is home to the last known habitat of the endemic Pak Bara giant soldier crab (Mictyris thailandensis).

In the field of science and environmental communication, Thamrongnawasawat has also worked as a columnist for several newspapers, hosted television and radio programs, and founded the website Talaythai.com. He has written more than 20 books about the sea, including "ใต้ทะเลมีความรัก" (Under the Sea, There Is Love), a documentary-style book written partly as a story that makes readers feel as though they have become part of an underwater family alongside marine animals such as leatherback turtles, manta rays, seahorses, and whales. He continues to use his personal Facebook account, which has about 320,000 followers, to share stories about the sea from various perspectives, as well as topics related to the environment, travel, and his personal interests. Thamrongnawasawt also provided the Thai voice for the narrator in the animated film Finding Dory (2016), a role voiced in the original version by Sigourney Weaver.
