= Long-tail boat =

Southeast Asian watercraft

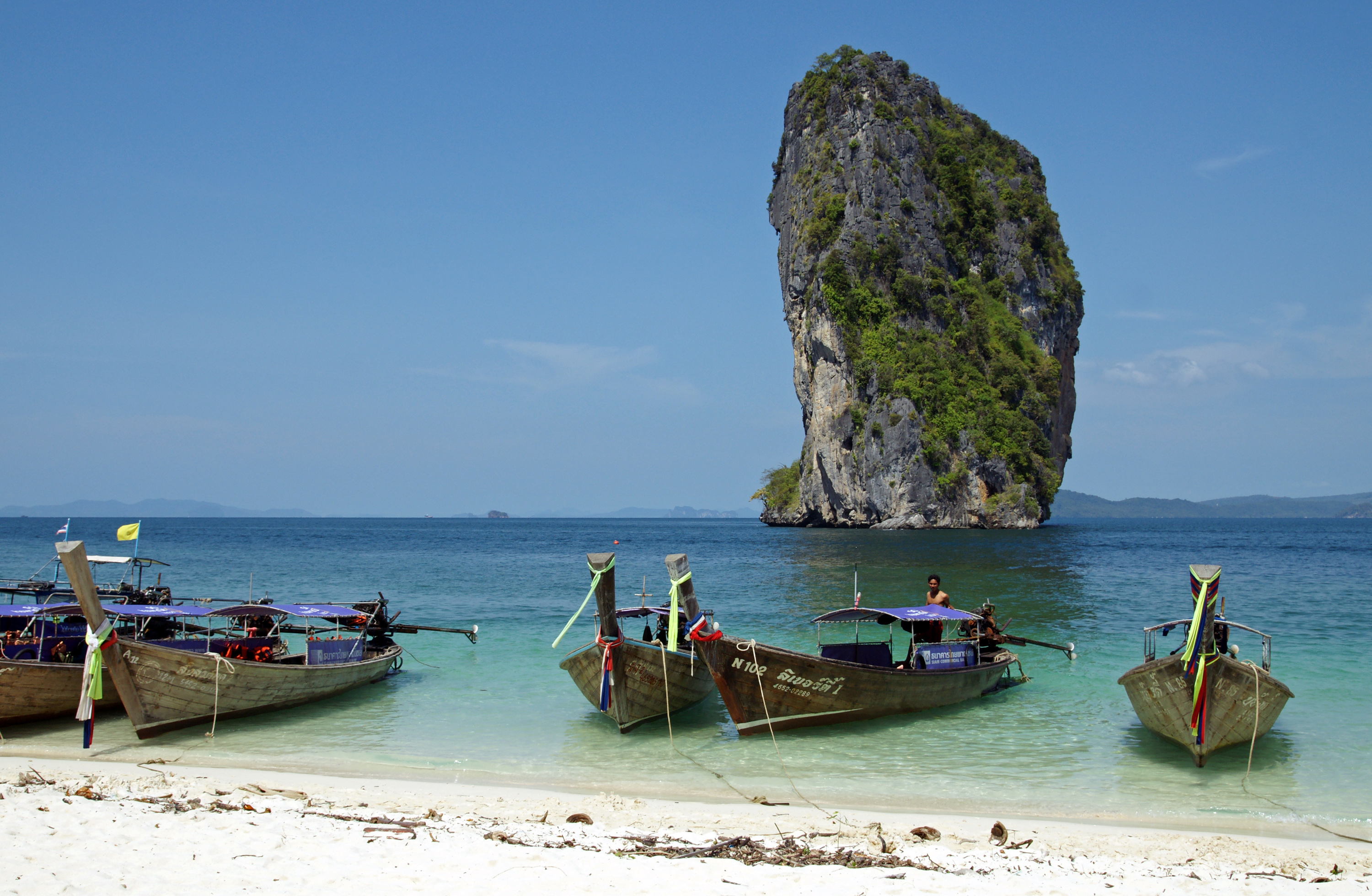
Long-tail boats on Poda island, Krabi, Thailand.

The long-tail boat (Thai: เรือหางยาว, RTGS: ruea hang yao, pronounced [rɯ̄ːa̯ hǎːŋ jāːw]) is a type of watercraft native to Southeast Asia that uses a common automotive engine as a readily available and maintainable powerplant. A craft designed to carry passengers on a river may include a lightweight, long canoe hull, up to 30 metres long, and a canopy. There is much variation among these boats, some having evolved from traditional craft types, while others have a more improvised look — the sole defining characteristic is a second-hand car or truck engine.

Long-tail boats are now often used to transport tourists. There are also competitions involving long-tail boats in some provinces of Thailand.

== History ==
The long-tail boat, also known as "Ruea Hang Yao" in Thai, is a type of watercraft that originated in Thailand in the early 20th century. The first long-tail boat was created by Sanong Thitibura in Sing Buri province, Thailand, in the 1930s. Thitibura, who worked as a helmsman for the royal family, developed the long-tail boat by mounting an engine on a rowing boat and extending the shaft to create a long propeller. Since then, the long-tail boat has been further developed by other boat builders in Thailand, including Sucheep Ratsarn, Chanchai Phairatkhun, Sukhum Chirawanit, and Samai Kittikhun. Today, the long-tail boat is a popular and iconic form of transportation and fishing boat, often used to transport passengers and tourists and employed as sightseeing boats in coastal areas.

== Propulsion ==
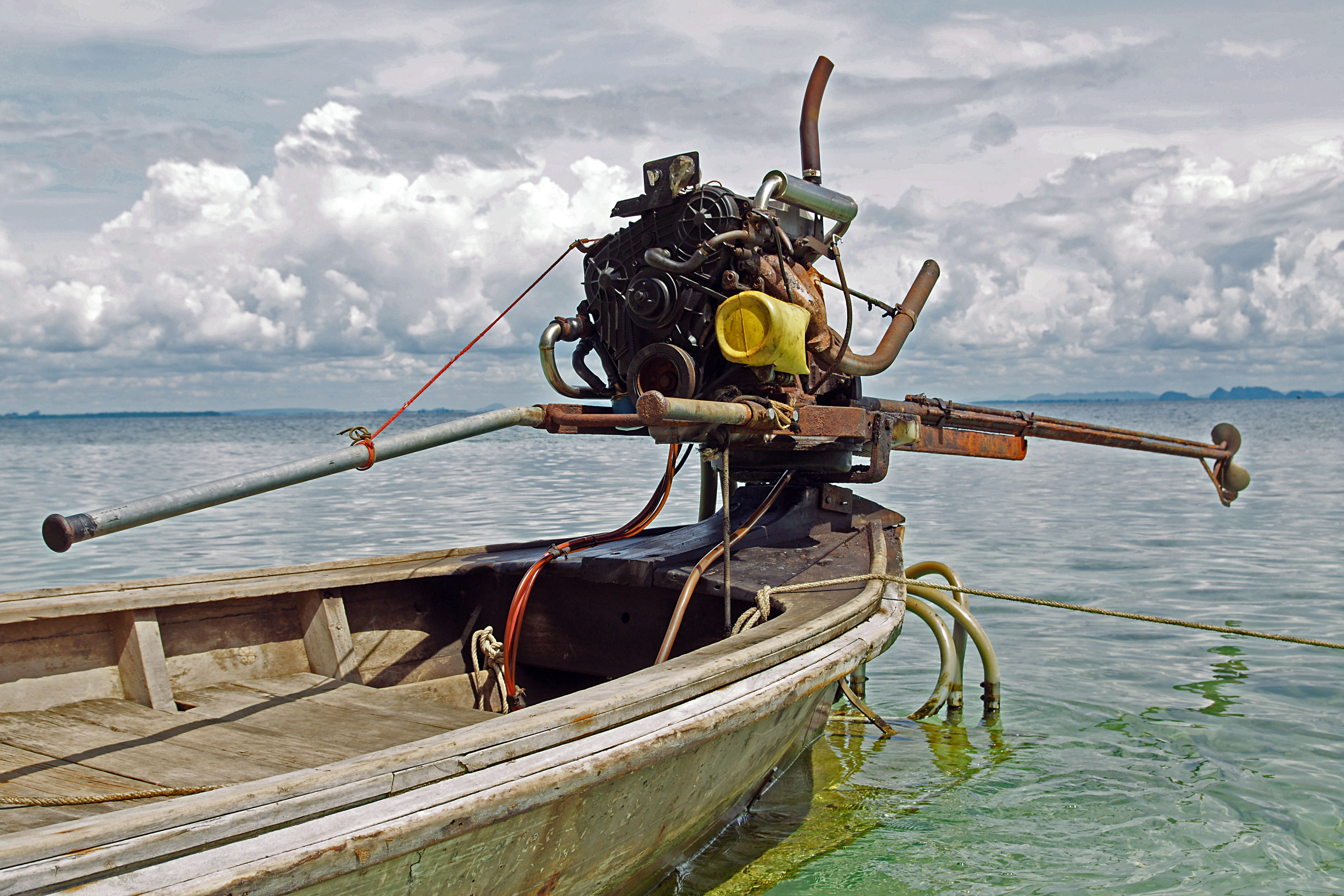
The engine of a long-tail boat, showing the simple construction.

The engine is invariably mounted on an inboard turret-like pole which can rotate through 180 degrees, allowing steering by thrust vectoring. The propeller is mounted directly on the drive shaft with no gearbox or transmission. Usually the engine also swivels up and down to provide a "neutral gear" where the propeller does not contact the water. The driveshaft must be extended by several metres of metal rod to properly position the propeller, giving the boat its name and distinct appearance.

Advantages to the inboard engine with a long driveshaft include keeping the engine relatively dry. Following the basic design pattern allows a variety of engines to be attached to a variety of different kinds of hulls. This flexibility simplifies construction and maintenance while sacrificing the efficiency and comfort that might be expected of a typical mass-produced product.

Engine cooling is provided by a metal pipe underneath the rear running board, which is used as a rudimentary heat exchanger. This is then coupled to the engine using rubber, PVC or plastic hoses. Clean water is then used as the coolant.

Control is achieved by moving the engine with a lever attached to the inboard side. Ignition and throttle controls provide simple means to control the craft. Larger boats may include more than one "tail", with several operators piloting in tandem.

== Costs ==
Long-tail costs have risen significantly. In 1989, the Thai government banned logging of natural forests. This led to a shortage of timber used in boat making, and required the wood to be imported from other countries. With a subsequent increase in the cost of imported timber came a decline in the number of new boats constructed, causing a rise in unit costs, from about 3,000 baht (US$83) to over 200,000 baht (US$5,500) in 2015, not including engine.

The rising costs of long-tails have made speedboats a more attractive alternative, as they hold more people and travel faster.

== Culture ==
In the 1974 James Bond series film The Man with the Golden Gun, Bond uses a long-tail boat to escape a group chasing him.

== See also ==
- Narrowboat
- Water transport in Bangkok
