= Mueang Krabi district =

Mueang Krabi เมืองกระบี่
- District
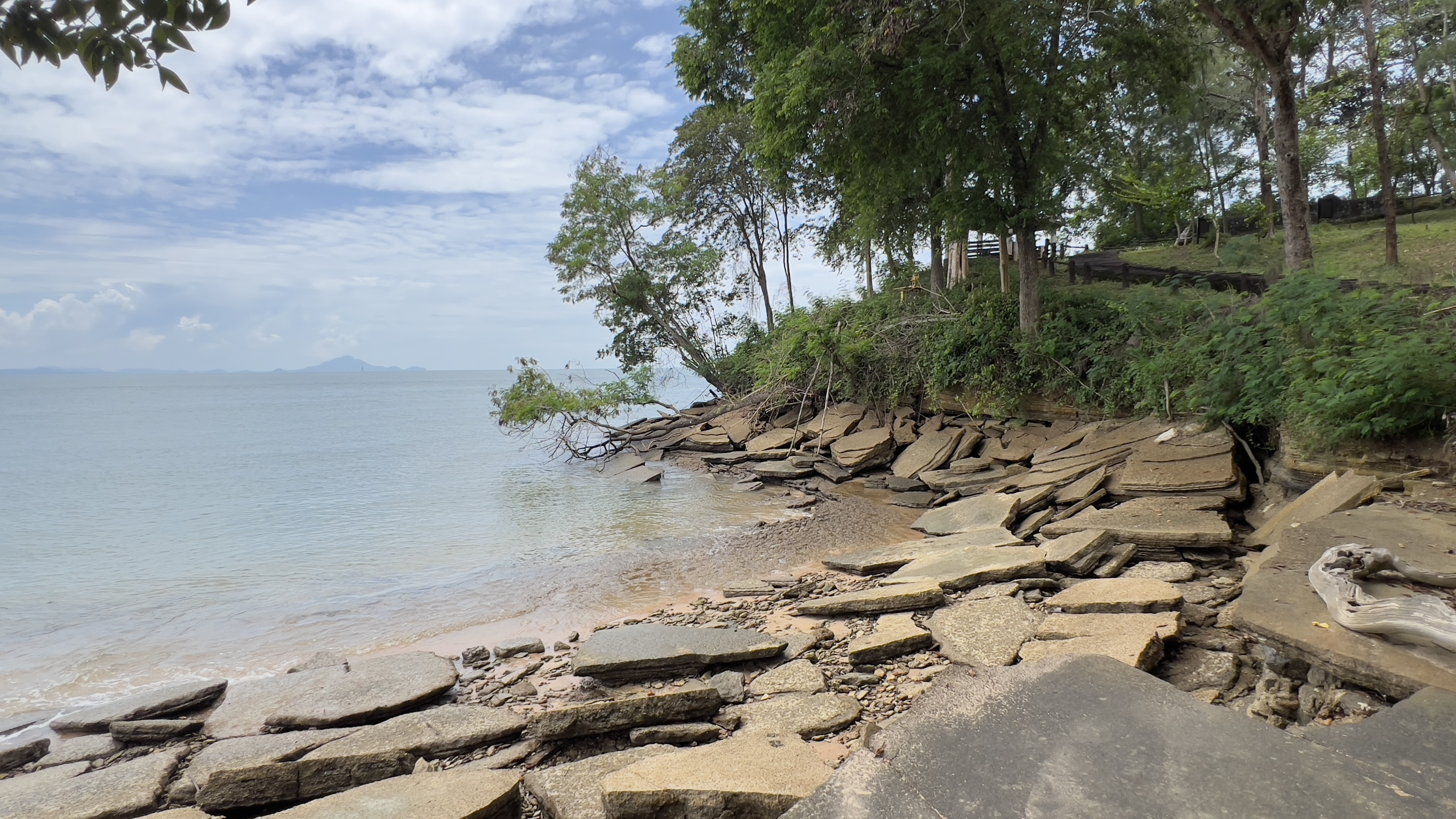
- Susan Hoi The Shell Cemetery, Sai Thai, Mueang Krabi

- District location in Krabi province
- Coordinates: 8°3′42″N 98°55′7″E
- Country: Thailand
- Province: Krabi
- Seat: Paknam

Area
  - Total: 595.7 km^{2} (230.0 sq mi)

Population (2000)
  - Total: 79,622
  - Density: 133.7/km^{2} (346/sq mi)
- Time zone: UTC+7 (ICT)
- Postal code: 81000
- Geocode: 8101

Mueang Krabi (Thai: เมืองกระบี่, pronounced [mɯ̄a̯ŋ krā.bìː]) is the capital district (amphoe mueang) of Krabi province in southern Thailand.

== Geography ==
Neighboring districts are (from the north clockwise): Ao Luek, Khao Phanom, and Nuea Khlong. To the south and west it borders Phang Nga Bay.

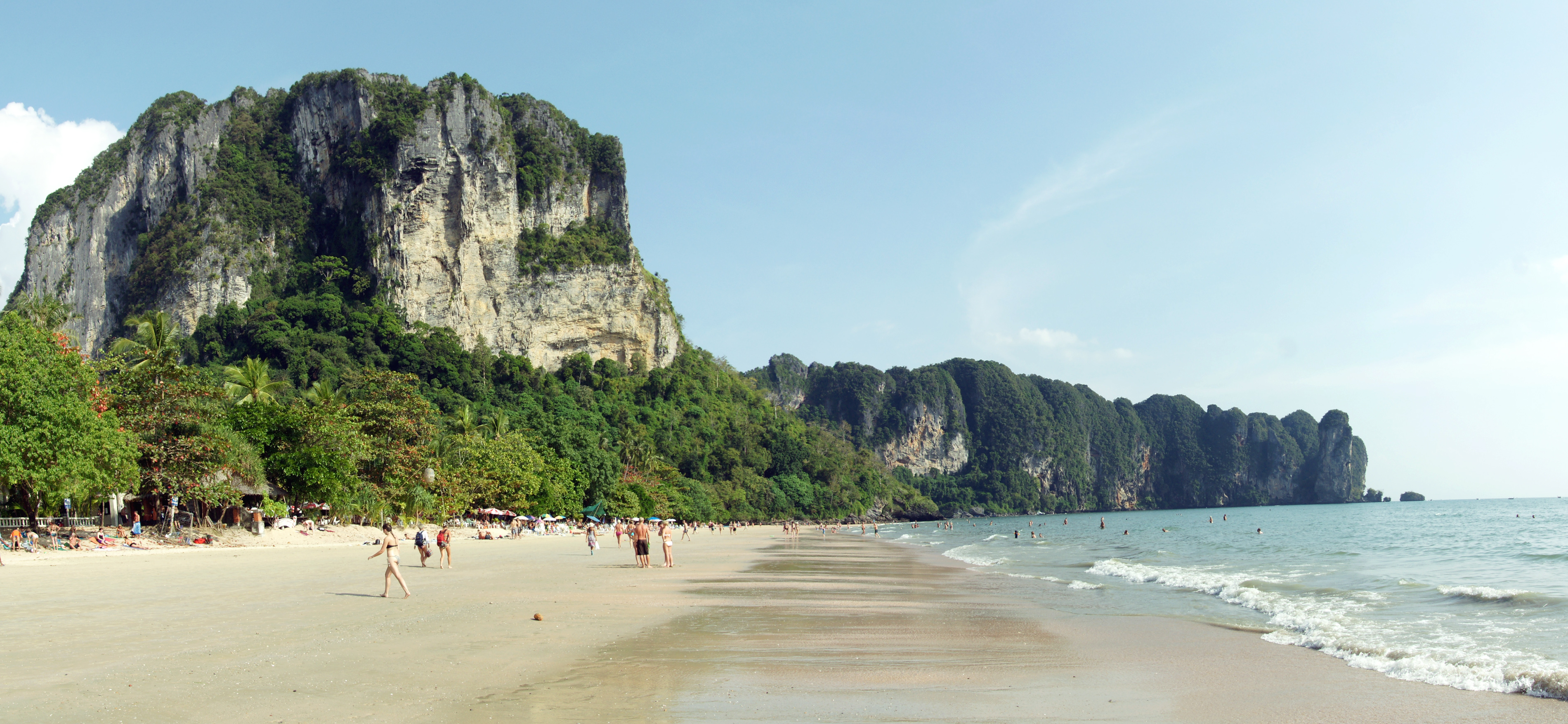
Ao Nang Beach

In the district is the Phi Phi Archipelago and several smaller islands. The karst landscape at the coast has attracts tourists to the beaches of Ao Nang and Railay, well known to rock climbers.

Khao Phanom Bencha National Park in the north of the district protects the forests around Phanom Bencha, the highest elevation in Krabi Province. That hills are also the source of the Krabi River, which empties into Phang Nga Bay at Krabi town. Its estuary with mangrove forests and mudflats is a Ramsar-protected wetland.

== Administration ==
The district is divided into 10 sub-districts (tambons), which are further subdivided into 66 villages (mubans). Krabi itself is the only town (thesaban mueang) of the district, covering tambons Pak Nam and Krabi Yai. The remaining tambons each have a tambon administrative organization (TAO).

No.	Name	Thai name	Villages	Pop.
1.	Pak Nam	ปากน้ำ	-	17,294
2.	Krabi Yai	กระบี่ใหญ่	-	7,692
3.	Krabi Noi	กระบี่น้อย	13	1,326
5.	Khao Khram	เขาคราม	6	9,249
6.	Khao Thong	เขาทอง	6	5,774
2551.	Thap Prik	ทับปริก	8	7,962
15.	Sai Thai	ไสไทย	7	10,851
16.	Ao Nang	อ่าวนาง	8	7,898
17.	Nong Thale	หนองทะเล	7	8,647
18.	Khlong Prasong	คลองประสงค์	11	4,670

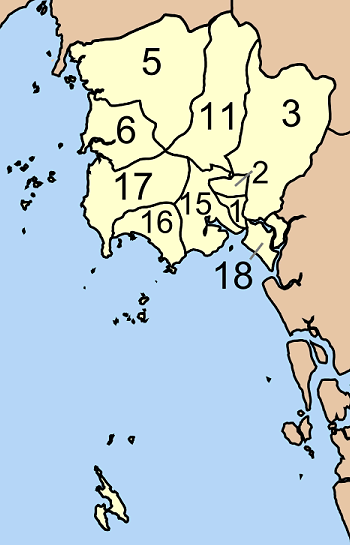

The missing numbers 4, 7-10 and 12-14 were split off as Nuea Khlong district
