= Ao Nang =

Town in Krabi Province

Ao Nang อ่าวนาง
- Subdistrict
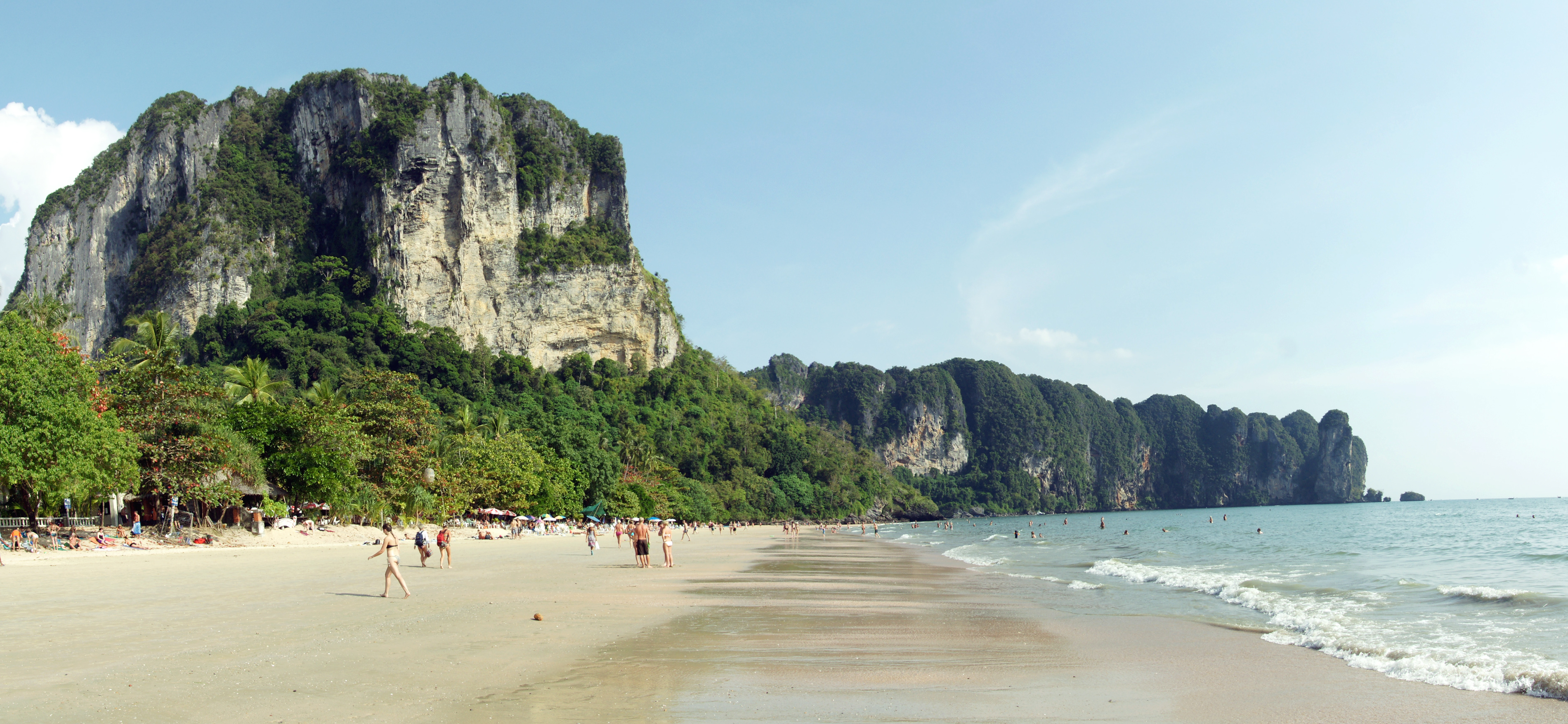
- Ao Nang Beach

- Location within Thailand
- Coordinates: 8°1′53″N 98°49′21″E
- Country: Thailand
- Province: Krabi
- District: Mueang Krabi

Area
  - Total: 50 km^{2} (19 sq mi)

Population (2020)
  - Total: 14,435
  - Density: 288.7/km^{2} (748/sq mi)
- Time zone: UTC+7 (ICT)
- Postal code: 81000
- Area code: 810116

Ao Nang (Thai: อ่าวนาง, pronounced [ʔàːw nāːŋ]) is a resort town and one of the ten subdistricts (tambon) of Mueang Krabi District, Krabi, Thailand.

== Geography ==
Ao Nang is a central point of the coastal province of Krabi, Thailand. The town consists chiefly of a main street, which is dominated by restaurants, pubs, shops and other commerce aimed at tourists. The main beach is used by sunbathers to a certain extent, but there are a large number of long-tail boats which offer access to other beaches on the mainland and on nearby islands.

== Environmental issues ==
Ao Nang has a wastewater treatment plant that is able to handle about 3,000 m^{3} of wastewater per day, not nearly enough, according to Ao Nang Administrative Organization (Or Bor Tor) President Pankum Kittithonkun.
