= List of islands of Thailand =

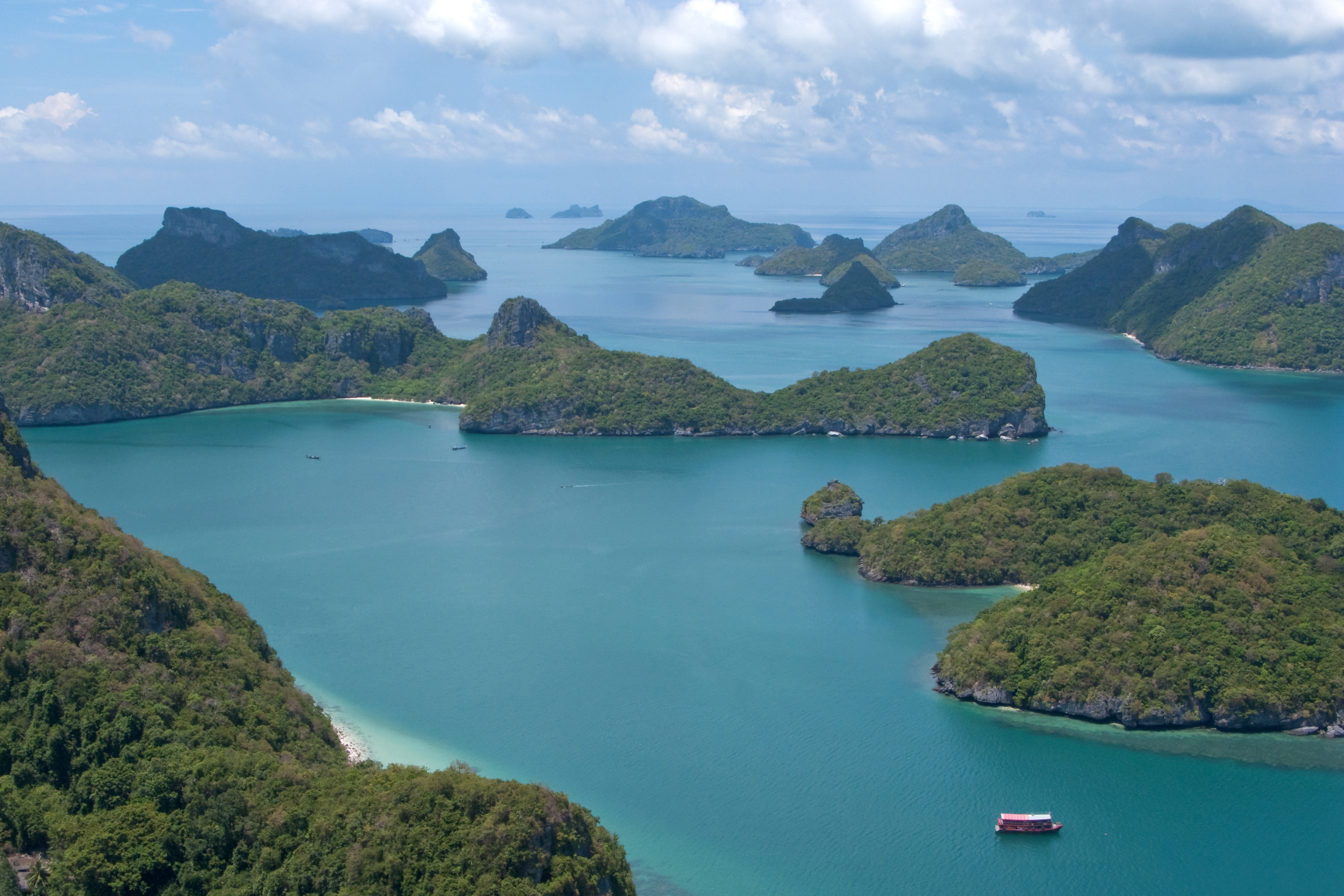
Ang Thong Marine Park

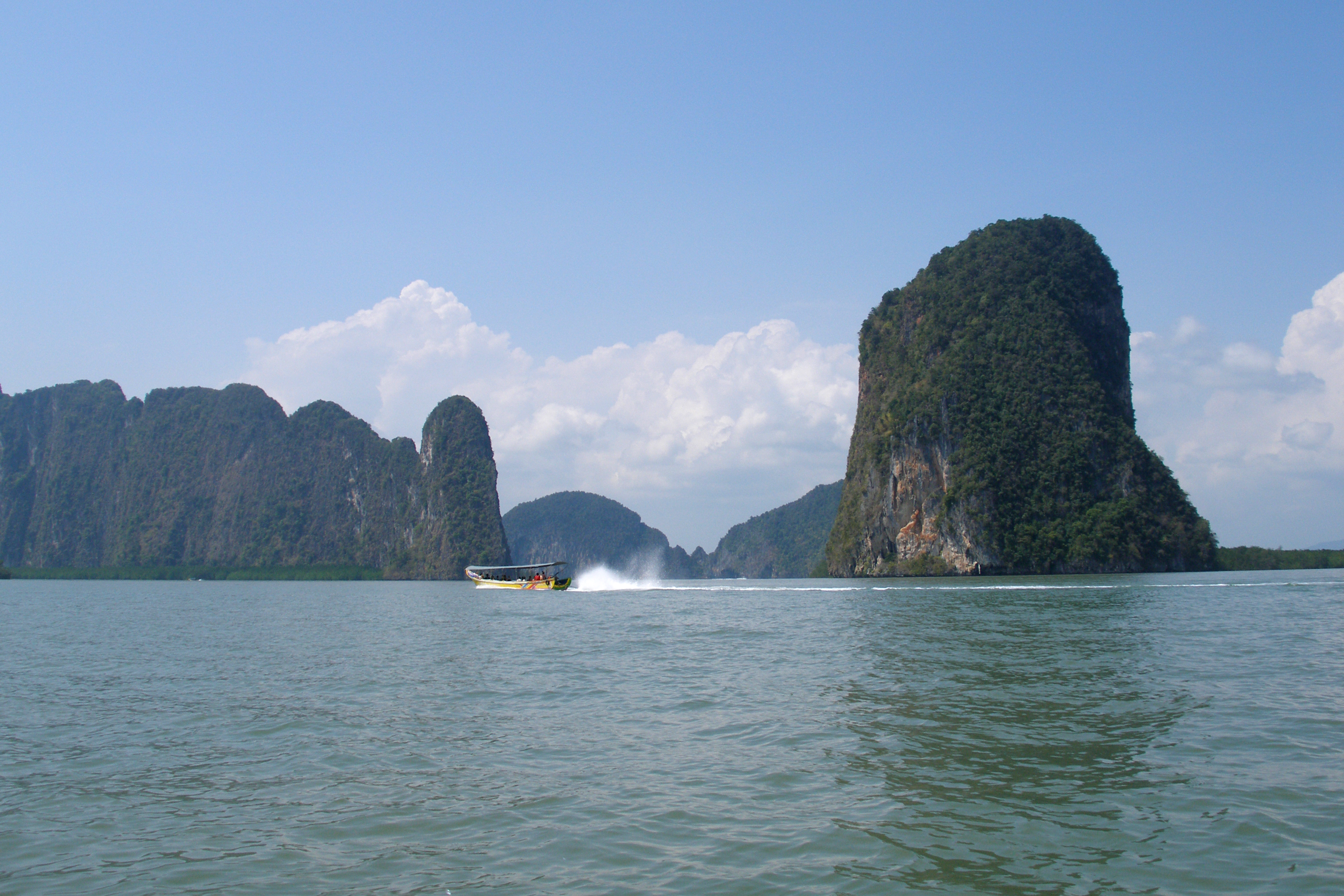
Islands of Phang Nga Bay

This is a list of islands of Thailand.

Thailand has hundreds of islands both in the Gulf of Thailand and in the Andaman Sea. The islands of the central Gulf of Thailand are mostly located near the coast. Formerly most of the islands in Thailand were uninhabited, but in recent times many have been developed for tourism.

Some of the island groups in Thailand come in clusters of numerous individual islands: Phang Nga Bay has 67, the Mu Ko Chang National Park has 52, Tarutao National Marine Park has 51, and Mu Ko Ang Thong National Park has 42.

Notes:

1. In Thai, the names of islands are usually preceded with the word ko (Thai เกาะ), the Thai word for island. This word is often alternately romanized as koh, go or goh. English language references to the names of the Thai islands should not have an additional "island" added to their names, or else the ko should be left off. For example, "Ko Phi Phi Island" would be redundant, since "Ko Phi Phi" already means "Phi Phi Island"
2. Various maps commonly spell Thai names differently, using different transliterations. For example, Ko Mak may be seen as Koh Mak, Koh Maak or even Koh Mark. This list gives precedence to the Royal Thai General System of Transcription favored by the Government of Thailand, for the English-based Thai transcription is now becoming obsolete.

To help in using search engines, the list also contains alternative names (used on some maps) either in the "Alternate spellings" column, or in parentheses.

== Eastern seaboard islands ==
Name	Thai Name	Alternative spellings	Province	Island Chain, Group, Archipelago	Coordinates
Ko Sichang	เกาะสีชัง		Chonburi	Main island of Ko Sichang group	13.145°N 100.813°E
Ko Kham Yai	เกาะขามใหญ่		Chonburi	Sichang group	13.167°N 100.824°E
Ko Kham Noi	เกาะขามน้อย		Chonburi	Sichang group	13.1744°N 100.8301°E
Ko Ram Dok Mai	เกาะร้ามดอกไม้	Ko Lam Dokmai	Chonburi	Sichang group	13.1528°N 100.8342°E
Ko Khang Khao	เกาะค้างคาว		Chonburi	Sichang group	13.114°N 100.808°E
Ko Prong	เกาะปรง		Chonburi	Sichang group	13.1652°N 100.8330°E
Ko Yai Thao			Chonburi	Sichang group	13.1234°N 100.8093°E
Ko Thaai Tamuen			Chonburi	Sichang group	13.1088°N 100.8033°E
Ko Nok	เกาะนอก		Chonburi	Rocky islet off Pattaya Bay	13.006°N 100.8033°E
Ko Chun	เกาะจุ่น		Chonburi	Rocky islet off Pattaya Bay	12.930°N 100.81°E
Ko Lan	เกาะล้าน		Chonburi	"Near Islands", off Pattaya	12.92°N 100.78°E
Ko Sak	เกาะสาก		Chonburi	"Near Islands", off Pattaya	12.9275°N 100.7920°E
Ko Krok	เกาะครก	Krok	Chonburi	"Near Islands", off Pattaya	12.9434°N 100.8057°E
Ko Loi	เกาะลอย	Loi	Chonburi	"Near islands", off Pattaya	13.1753°N 100.9197°E
Ko Luam	เกาะเหลื่อม		Chonburi	"Far Islands", off Pattaya	12.9581°N 100.6506°E
Ko Luam Noi	เกาะเหลื่อมน้อย	Ko Lueam Noi	Chonburi	"Far Islands", off Pattaya	12.9566°N 100.6573°E
Ko Phai	เกาะไผ่	Koh Pai	Chonburi	"Far Islands", off Pattaya	12.934°N 100.675°E
Ko Hu Chang	เกาะหูช้าง	Hoo Chang	Chonburi	"Far Islands", off Pattaya	12.9105°N 100.6775°E
Ko Klung Badan	เกาะกรุงบาดาล	Krung badan	Chonburi	"Far Islands", off Pattaya	12.9026°N 100.6796°E
Ko Man Wichai	เกาะมารวิชัย	Mun Wichai	Chonburi	"Far Islands", off Pattaya	12.8763°N 100.6742°E
Ko Rin	เกาะริน		Chonburi	south of "Far Islands", off Pattaya	
Ko Hin Khao	เกาะหินแก้ว	Hin Khao	Chonburi	south of "Far Islands", off Pattaya	
Hin Ton Mai			Chonburi	Rocky islet south of "Far Islands", off Pattaya	
Ko Klet Kaeo	เกาะเกล็ดแก้ว	Klet Kaeo	Chonburi	Ko Khram group	12.761°N 100.845°E
Ko Khram	เกาะคราม	Khram	Chonburi	Main island of Ko Khram group	12.70°N 100.79°E
Ko Khram Noi	เกาะครามน้อย		Chonburi	Ko Khram group	12.727°N 100.798°E
Ko I Ra	เกาะอีร้า	I Ra	Chonburi	Ko Khram group	12.676°N 100.823°E
Ko Tao Mo	เกาะเตาหม้อ		Chonburi	Sattahip Bay group	12°38′17″N 100°52′13″E
Ko Phra	เกาะพระ		Chonburi	Sattahip Bay group	12°38′37″N 100°53′17″E
Ko Phra Noi	เกาะพระน้อย		Chonburi	Sattahip Bay group	12°38′46″N 100°53′15″E
Ko I Lao	เกาะอีเลา		Chonburi	Sattahip Bay group	12°36′42″N 100°52′32″E
Ko Yo	เกาะยอ		Chonburi	Sattahip Bay group	12°36′59″N 100°52′52″E
Ko Mu	เกาะหมู		Chonburi	Sattahip Bay group	12°37′26″N 100°54′3″E
Ko Maeo	เกาะแมว		Chonburi	Sattahip Bay group	12°36′40″N 100°53′21″E
Ko Nang Ram	เกาะนางรำ		Chonburi	Sattahip Bay group	12°36′59″N 100°56′3″E
Ko Chorakhe	เกาะจระเข้		Chonburi	Sattahip Bay group	12°36′12″N 100°55′0″E
Ko Samae San	เกาะแสมสาร	Samaesan	Chonburi	Main island of Ko Samae San group	12.573°N 100.95°E
Ko Kham	เกาะขาม		Chonburi	Ko Samae San group	12.573°N 100.934°E
Ko Raet	เกาะแรด	Rat, Rad	Chonburi	Ko Samae San group	12.585°N 100.964°E
Ko Chang Kluea		Changkluea	Chonburi	Ko Samae San group	12.550°N 100.971°E
Ko Chuang	เกาะช่วง		Chonburi	Ko Samae San group	12.520°N 100.96°E
Ko Chan	เกาะจาน		Chonburi	Ko Samae San group	12.521°N 100.970°E
Ko Rong Nang	เกาะโรงหนัง		Chonburi	Ko Samae San group	12.53437°N 100.95870°E
Ko Rong Khon	เกาะโรงโขน		Chonburi	Ko Samae San group	12.53169°N 100.95972°E
Ko Saket			Rayong	By Rayong harbour	12°38′54″N 101°10′14″E
Ko Samet	เกาะเสม็ด	Ko Samed	Rayong	Main island of Ko Samet group	12.565°N 101.45°E
Ko Platin			Rayong	Ko Samet group	12.6019°N 101.5148°E
Ko Kraui			Rayong	Ko Samet group	12.5932°N 101.5108°E
Ko Kudi		Kudee	Rayong	Ko Samet group, East	12.5839°N 101.5101°E
Ko Khangkhao			Rayong	Ko Samet group, East	12.5796°N 101.5104°E
Ko Kham	เกาะขาม		Rayong	Ko Samet group, East	12.5945°N 101.509°E
Ko Yangklao		Yungklao	Rayong	Ko Samet group	12.5578°N 101.5691°E
Ko Thalu	เกาะทะลุ		Rayong	Ko Samet group, East	12.5557°N 101.5695°E
Ko Khi Pla	เกาะขี้ปลา		Rayong	Coastal island	12°38′15″N 101°37′52″E
Ko Man Nai	เกาะมันใน	Man Nai	Rayong	Ko Man Nai group	12.6114°N 101.688°E
Ko Man Khlang	เกาะมันกลาง	Man Glang	Rayong	Ko Man Nai group	12.5975°N 101.692°E
Ko Man Nok	เกาะมันนอก	Mun Nok, Mun Nawk	Rayong	Ko Man Nai group	12.5841°N 101.697°E

== Islands in Chanthaburi and Trat Provinces ==
Name	Thai Name	Alternative spellings	Province	Island Chain, Group, Archipelago	Coordinates
Ko Chong Saba	เกาะช่องสะบ้า		Chanthaburi	Coastal island	12°30′41″N 101°56′56″E
Ko Nom Sao	เกาะนมสาว		Chanthaburi	Coastal island	12°27′46″N 102°1′20″E
Ko Chula	เกาะจุฬา		Chanthaburi	Coastal island	12°27′55″N 102°3′56″E
Ko Nu	เกาะหนู		Chanthaburi	Coastal island	12°27′26″N 102°5′30″E
Ko Nang Ram	เกาะนางรำ		Chanthaburi	Coastal island	12°25′24″N 102°6′37″E
Ko Kwang	เกาะกวาง		Chanthaburi	Coastal island	12°23′45″N 102°7′59″E
Ko Chik Nok	เกาะจิกนอก	Ko Chik	Chanthaburi	Coastal island	12°17′30″N 102°14′18″E
Ko Chik Klang	เกาะจิกกลาง		Chanthaburi	Coastal island	12°17′17″N 102°15′4″E
Ko Chang	เกาะช้าง		Trat	Main island of Ko Chang group	12.06°N 102.33°E
Ko Ngam	เกาะง่าม		Trat	Ko Chang Marine National Park	11.951°N 102.443°E
Ko Phrao Nai	เกาะพร้าวใน		Trat	Ko Chang Marine National Park	11.982°N 102.387°E
Ko Phrao Nok	เกาะพร้าวนอก		Trat	Ko Chang Marine National Park	11.973°N 102.392°E
Ko Chang Noi	เกาะช้างน้อย		Trat	Ko Chang Marine National Park	
Ko Suwan			Trat	Ko Chang Marine National Park	
Ko Rom			Trat	Ko Chang Marine National Park	
Ko Lim			Trat	Ko Chang Marine National Park	
Ko Salak			Trat	Ko Chang Marine National Park	
Ko Yuak	เกาะหยวก		Trat	Ko Chang Marine National Park	
Ko Man Nai	เกาะมันใน		Trat	Ko Chang Marine National Park	
Ko Man Nok	เกาะมันนอก	Mun Nok	Trat	Ko Chang Marine National Park	12.013°N 102.268°E
Ko Klum	เกาะคลุ้ม	Kloom	Trat	Ko Chang Marine National Park	11.914°N 102.354°E
Mu Ko Lao Ya	หมู่เกาะเหลายา	Moo Koh Lao Ya	Trat	Island pair in Ko Chang MNP	11.942°N 102.407°E
Ko Lao Ya Nai	เกาะเหลายาใน		Trat	Ko Chang Marine National Park	11.942°N 102.407°E
Ko Lao Ya Nok	เกาะเหลายานอก		Trat	Ko Chang Marine National Park	11.931°N 102.411°E
Ko Wai	เกาะหวาย		Trat	Ko Chang Marine National Park	11.900°N 102.405°E
Mu Ko Mai Si	หมู่เกาะไม้ซี้	Moo Koh Mai See	Trat	Island pair in Ko Chang MNP	11.946°N 102.475°E
Ko Mai Si Yai	เกาะไม้ซี้ใหญ่		Trat	Ko Chang MNP	11.946°N 102.475°E
Ko Mai Si Lek	เกาะไม้ซี้เล็ก		Trat	Ko Chang MNP	11.955°N 102.497°E
Ko Bai Dang	เกาะไปแดง		Trat	Ko Chang Marine National Park	11.898°N 102.451°E
Ko Chan	เกาะจาน		Trat	Ko Chang Marine National Park	11.916°N 102.473°E
Ko Kut	เกาะกูด	Ko Kuut, Koh Koot	Trat	Ko Chang Marine National Park	11.66°N 102.57°E
Ko Mak	เกาะหมาก	Ko Maak	Trat	Ko Chang Marine National Park	11.819°N 102.480°E
Ko Phi	เกาะผี		Trat	Ko Chang Marine National Park	
Ko Kham	เกาะขาม		Trat	Ko Chang Marine National Park	
Ko Thong			Trat	Ko Chang Marine National Park	
Ko Rayang Nok	เกาะระยั้งนอก		Trat	Ko Chang Marine National Park	11.798°N 102.451°E
Ko Rayang Nok	เกาะระยั้งใน		Trat	Ko Chang Marine National Park	
Ko Kradat	เกาะกระดาด		Trat	Ko Chang Marine National Park	11.840°N 102.5275°E
Mu Ko Rang	หมู่เกาะรัง	Moo Ko Rang	Trat	12-island group in Ko Chang MNP	11.80°N 102.387°E
Ko Rang	เกาะรัง		Trat	Ko Chang Marine National Park	11.80°N 102.387°E
Ko Tun	เกาะตูน		Trat	Ko Chang Marine National Park	11.774°N 102.393°E

== West coast islands (Gulf of Thailand) ==
Name	Thai Name	Alternative spellings	Province	Island Chain, Group, Archipelago	Coordinates
Ko Sai	เกาะทราย	Ko Singto (Lion Island)	Prachuap Khiri Khan	Pran Rocks (off Hua Hin)	12.483°N 100.000°E
Ko Sadao	เกาะสะเดา	Ko Tao	Prachuap Khiri Khan	Pran Rocks	12.466°N 100.000°E
Ko Khi Nok	เกาะขี้นก	Ko Nok	Prachuap Khiri Khan	Pran Rocks	12.483°N 100.000°E
Ko Kho Ram	เกาะโครำ	Ko Kolam	Prachuap Khiri Khan	Khao Sam Roi Yot area	12°14′33″N 100°0′32″E
Ko Nom Sao	เกาะนมสาว		Prachuap Khiri Khan	Khao Sam Roi Yot area	12°13′52″N 100°0′17″E
Ko Rawang	เกาะระวาง		Prachuap Khiri Khan	Khao Sam Roi Yot area	12°13′34″N 100°0′36″E
Ko Rawing	เกาะระวิง		Prachuap Khiri Khan	Khao Sam Roi Yot area	12°13′28″N 100°0′34″E
Ko Sattakut	เกาะสัตกูต		Prachuap Khiri Khan	Khao Sam Roi Yot area	12.200°N 100.016°E
Ko Lak	เกาะหลัก		Prachuap Khiri Khan	Prachuap Bay area	11°47′50″N 99°48′55″E
Ko La	เกาะละ		Prachuap Khiri Khan	Prachuap Bay area	11°47′38″N 99°48′54″E
Ko Rom	เกาะร่ม		Prachuap Khiri Khan	Prachuap Bay area	11°47′27″N 99°48′58″E
Ko Raet	เกาะแรด		Prachuap Khiri Khan	Prachuap Bay area	11°47′38″N 99°49′24″E
Ko Lueam	เกาะเหลื่อม		Prachuap Khiri Khan	Ao Manao area	11°45′34″N 99°49′54″E
Ko Aen	เกาะแอ่น		Prachuap Khiri Khan	Ao Manao area	11°45′59″N 99°48′35″E
Ko Phing	เกาะพิง		Prachuap Khiri Khan	South of Ao Manao area	11°43′13″N 99°47′30″E
Ko Phang	เกาะพัง		Prachuap Khiri Khan	South of Ao Manao area	11°42′32″N 99°47′18″E
Ko Chan	เกาะจาน		Prachuap Khiri Khan	Off Hat Wanakon area	11°37′25″N 99°46′27″E
Ko Thai Chan	เกาะท้ายจาน		Prachuap Khiri Khan	Off Hat Wanakon area	11°37′12″N 99°46′25″E
Ko Ram Ra	เกาะร่ำรา		Prachuap Khiri Khan	Khao Huai Khrok area	11°24′8″N 99°36′20″E
Ko Hua Pin	เกาะหัวพิน		Prachuap Khiri Khan	Khao Mae Ram Phueng area	11°13′0″N 99°34′47″E
Ko Thalu	เกาะทะลุ		Prachuap Khiri Khan	Khao Mae Ram Phueng area	11°4′26″N 99°33′33″E
Ko Sing	เกาะสิงข์		Prachuap Khiri Khan	Khao Mae Ram Phueng area	11°3′19″N 99°31′31″E
Ko Sang	เกาะสังข์		Prachuap Khiri Khan	Khao Mae Ram Phueng area	11°1′52″N 99°31′1″E

== Southern islands (Gulf of Thailand) ==
Name	Thai Name	Alternative spellings	Province	Island Chain, Group, Archipelago	Coordinates
Ko Wiang	เกาะเวียง		Chumphon	Pathio District coast	10°50′45″N 99°28′54″E
Ko Phra	เกาะพระ		Chumphon	Pathio District coast	10°51′51″N 99°29′20″E
Ko Yo	เกาะยอ		Chumphon	Pathio District coast	10°51′40″N 99°29′10″E
Ko Khi Nok	เกาะขี้นก		Chumphon	Pathio District coast	10°50′57″N 99°28′25″E
Ko Si Kong	เกาะซีกง		Chumphon	Pathio District coast	10°50′19″N 99°29′50″E
Ko Rang	เกาะรัง		Chumphon	Pathio District coast	10°49′17″N 99°29′31″E
Ko Khai	เกาะไข่		Chumphon	Pathio District coast	10°42′2″N 99°24′37″E
Ko Chorakhe	เกาะจรเข้		Chumphon	Mu Ko Chumphon Archipelago North	10°33′22″N 99°22′44″E
Ko Ngam Yai	เกาะงามใหญ่		Chumphon	Mu Ko Chumphon Archipelago North	10°29′36″N 99°25′13″E
Ko Ngam Noi	เกาะงามน้อย	Ngam Lek	Chumphon	Mu Ko Chumphon Archipelago North	10°29′6″N 99°25′5″E
Ko Kalok	เกาะกะโหลก		Chumphon	Mu Ko Chumphon Archipelago North	10°28′33″N 99°22′9″E
Ko Samet	เกาะเสม็ด		Chumphon	Mu Ko Chumphon Archipelago	10°26′20″N 99°17′45″E
Ko Sak	เกาะสาก		Chumphon	Mu Ko Chumphon Archipelago	10°25′28″N 99°18′56″E
Ko Maphrao	เกาะมะพร้าว		Chumphon	Mu Ko Chumphon Archipelago	10°23′25″N 99°18′56″E
Ko Matra	เกาะมาตรา	Ko Mattra	Chumphon	Mu Ko Chumphon Archipelago	10°23′46″N 99°17′38″E
Ko Lak Raet	เกาะหลักแรด		Chumphon	Mu Ko Chumphon Archipelago	10°22′49″N 99°19′40″E
Ko I Raet	เกาะอีแรด		Chumphon	Mu Ko Chumphon Archipelago	10°22′32″N 99°19′18″E
Ko Lawa	เกาะละวะ		Chumphon	Mu Ko Chumphon Archipelago	10°21′47″N 99°18′35″E
Ko Ka	เกาะกา		Chumphon	Mu Ko Chumphon Archipelago	10°20′52″N 99°17′42″E
Ko Thong Lang	เกาะทองหลาง		Chumphon	Mu Ko Chumphon Archipelago	10°19′24″N 99°16′53″E
Ko Wang Ka Chio	เกาะวังกะจิว		Chumphon	Mu Ko Chumphon Archipelago	10°19′7″N 99°18′2″E
Ko Kra	เกาะกระ		Chumphon	Mu Ko Chumphon Archipelago	10.25°N 99.25°E
Ko Ran Gai			Chumphon	Mu Ko Chumphon Archipelago	
Ko Ran Bod			Chumphon	Mu Ko Chumphon Archipelago	
Ko Kula			Chumphon	Mu Ko Chumphon Archipelago	10.25°N 99.25°E
Ko Klaep			Chumphon	Mu Ko Chumphon Archipelago	
Ko Khram			Chumphon	Mu Ko Chumphon Archipelago	
Ko Samui	เกาะสมุย		Surat Thani	Mu Ko Chumphon Archipelago	9.50°N 100.00°E
Ko Pha Ngan	เกาะพะงัน		Surat Thani	Mu Ko Chumphon Archipelago	9°45′N 100°02′E
Ko Nang Yuan	เกาะนางยวน		Surat Thani	Mu Ko Chumphon Archipelago	10.09°N 99.838°E
Ko Nan			Surat Thani	Mu Ko Chumphon Archipelago	
Ko Tao	เกาะเต่า		Surat Thani	Mu Ko Chumphon Archipelago	10.09°N 99.838°E
Ko Phaluai			Surat Thani	Angthong Marine Park (S.)	
Ko Tu			Surat Thani	Angthong Marine Park (S.)	
Ko Khluai			Surat Thani	Angthong Marine Park (S.)	
Ko Lak			Surat Thani	Angthong Marine Park (S.)	
Ko Mu Dang		Ko Moo Dang	Surat Thani	Angthong Marine Park (S.)	
Ko Tao Pun			Surat Thani	Angthong Marine Park (S.)	
Ko Kang Tak			Surat Thani	Angthong Marine Park (S.)	
Ko Pai Luek			Surat Thani	Angthong Marine Park (E.)	
Ko Wua Te			Surat Thani	Angthong Marine Park (E.)	
Ko Chae			Surat Thani	Angthong Marine Park (E.)	
Ko Wua Talah			Surat Thani	Angthong Marine Park (N.)	
Ko Phi		Koh Pee	Surat Thani	Angthong Marine Park (N.)	
Ko Mae Koh			Surat Thani	Angthong Marine Park (N.)	
Ko Hin Tak			Surat Thani	Angthong Marine Park (N.)	
Ko Sam Sao	เกาะสามเส้า		Surat Thani	Angthong Marine Park (N.)	
Ko Ao Rat		Ko Ao Rad	Surat Thani	Angthong Marine Park (N.)	
Ko Pae Yat			Surat Thani	Angthong Marine Park (N.)	
Ko Pra			Surat Thani	Angthong Marine Park (N.)	
Ko Wua Kantang			Surat Thani	Angthong Marine Park (N.)	
Ko Chang Trom			Surat Thani	Angthong Marine Park (N.)	
Ko Sano Ban			Surat Thani	Angthong Marine Park (N.)	
Ko Lae			Surat Thani	Angthong Marine Park (N.)	
Ko Wa Noi			Surat Thani	Angthong Marine Park (N.)	
Ko Wa Yai			Surat Thani	Angthong Marine Park (N.)	
Ko Hin Dap			Surat Thani	Angthong Marine Park (N.)	
Ko Nai Put			Surat Thani	Angthong Marine Park (N.)	
Ko Ka			Surat Thani	Angthong Marine Park (N.)	
Ko Rod			Surat Thani	Angthong Marine Park (N.)	
Ko Ngam			Surat Thani	Angthong Marine Park (N.)	
Ko Tai Plao			Surat Thani	Angthong Marine Park (N.)	

== Southern islands (Andaman Coast) ==
Name	Thai Name	Alternative spellings	Province	Island Chain, Group, Archipelago	Coordinates
Ko Chang (Ranong)			Ranong	Mu Ko Phayam	
Ko Sin Hai			Ranong	Mu Ko Phayam	
Ko Dom			Ranong	Mu Ko Phayam	
Ko Plai			Ranong	Mu Ko Phayam	
Ko Talu (Rayong)			Ranong	Mu Ko Phayam	
Ko Phayam	เกาะพยาม	Payam	Ranong	Mu Ko Phayam	
Ko Kang Khao	เกาะค้างคาว		Ranong		
Mu Ko Kom	หมู่เกาะกำ	Moo Ko Kam	Ranong		
Ko Kam	เกาะกำ	Ko Kom	Ranong	Mu Ko Khom group	
Ko Kam Tok	เกาะกำตก	Ko Kom Tok	Ranong	Mu Ko Khom group	
Ko Kam Yai		Ko Kom Yai	Ranong	Mu Ko Khom group	
Ko Kam Nui		Ko Kom Nui	Ranong	Mu Ko Khom group	
Ko Surin Nua			Phang Nga	Surin Islands group	
Ko Surin Tai			Phang Nga	Surin Islands group	
Ko Ri			Phang Nga	Surin Islands group	
Ko Kai			Phang Nga	Surin Islands group	
Ko Klang			Phang Nga	Surin Islands group	
Ko Similan	เกาะสิมิลัน		Phang Nga		8.65°N 97.65°E
Ko Bangu			Phang Nga	Similan Islands	8.654°N 97.650°E
Ko Payu			Phang Nga	Similan Islands	8.590°N 97.638°E
Ko Miang			Phang Nga	Similan Islands	8.600°N 97.637°E
Ko Payang			Phang Nga	Similan Islands	8.498°N 97.646°E
Ko Huyang			Phang Nga	Similan Islands	8.479°N 97.650°E
Ko Tachai		Ko Tasai	Phang Nga	Similan Islands	
Ko Born		Ko Bon	Phang Nga	Similan Islands	
Ko Ra			Phang Nga	Phang Nga N Coast	
Ko Kad		Ko Khat	Phang Nga	Phang Nga N Coast	
Ko Ko Khao			Phang Nga	Phang Nga N Coast	
Ko Phra Thong			Phang Nga	Phang Nga N Coast	
Ko Thung Nang Dam			Phang Nga	Phang Nga N Coast	

== Southern islands (Phang Nga Bay) ==
Name	Thai Name	Alternative spellings	Province	Island Chain, Group, Archipelago	Coordinates
Ko Nom Sao	เกาะนมสาว	Ko Ok Meri	Phang Nga	Phang Nga Bay	8°4′47″N 98°37′38″E
Ko Kaya		Ko Ok Khum	Phang Nga	Phang Nga Bay	
Ko Raya Ring			Phang Nga	Phang Nga Bay	
Ko Ping Kan	เกาะเขาพิงกัน		Phang Nga	Phang Nga Bay	
Ko Mak			Phang Nga	Phang Nga Bay	
Ko Na Khae			Phang Nga	Phang Nga Bay	
Ko Tapu	เกาะตะปู	"James Bond Island"	Phang Nga		8°16′31.36″N 98°30′02.02″E
Ko Hong	เกาะห้อง		Phang Nga	Phang Nga Bay	
Ko Nakaya			Phang Nga	Phang Nga Bay	
Ko Nakae			Phang Nga	Phang Nga Bay	
Ko Yai			Phang Nga	Phang Nga Bay	
Ko Batang			Phang Nga	Phang Nga Bay	
Ko Rai			Phang Nga	Phang Nga Bay	
Ko Boi Noi			Phang Nga	Phang Nga Bay	
Ko Boi Yai			Phang Nga	Phang Nga Bay	
Ko Dang			Phang Nga	Phang Nga Bay	
Ko Kudu Yai			Phang Nga	Phang Nga Bay	
Ko Nui			Phang Nga	Phang Nga Bay	
Ko Sup			Phang Nga	Phang Nga Bay	
Ko Panyi	เกาะปันหยี	Ko Panyee	Phang Nga	Phang Nga Bay	
Ko Panak	เกาะพนัก	Koh Panas	Phang Nga	Phang Nga Bay	
Ko Yao Yai	เกาะยาวใหญ่		Phang Nga	Phang Nga Bay	
Ko Yao Noi	เกาะยาวน้อย		Phang Nga	Phang Nga Bay	
Ko Rung Nok			Phang Nga	Phang Nga Bay	
Mu Ko Phi Phi	หมู่เกาะพีพี		Krabi	6-island group "Phi Phi Islands"	
Ko Phi Phi Don	เกาะพีพีดอน		Krabi	Phi Phi Islands	
Ko Phi Phi Leh	เกาะพีพีเล		Krabi	Phi Phi Islands	
Ko Bida Nok	เกาะปิดะนอก		Krabi	Phi Phi Islands	
Ko Bida Noi	เกาะปิดะใน		Krabi	Phi Phi Islands	
Ko Mai Phai	เกาะไม้ไฟ่	Ko Mai Pai	Krabi	North Krabi	
Ko Phai	เกาะไฟ่	Ko Pai	Krabi	North Krabi	
Ko Yoong	เกาะยูง		Krabi	North Krabi	
Ko Chong Lat			Krabi	North Krabi	
Ko Phudu Yai			Krabi	North Krabi	
Ko Pak Bia			Krabi	North Krabi	
Ko Hong (Krabi)			Krabi	North Krabi	
Ko Kapang			Krabi	North Krabi	
Ko Ngang			Krabi	North Krabi	
Ko Pu	เกาะปู	Koh Pu / Koh Poo	Krabi	Mid Krabi	7°58′N 98°20′E
Ko Siboya	เกาะปู	Koh Si Boya	Krabi	Mid Krabi	7°58′N 98°20′E
Ko Jum	เกาะปู	Koh Joom	Krabi	Mid Krabi	7°58′N 98°20′E
Ko Kai, Krabi	เกาะไก่	Koh Gai / Chicken Island	Krabi	Mid Krabi	7°58′N 98°20′E
Ko Pli	เกาะไก่		Krabi	Mid Krabi	7°58′N 98°20′E
Ko Lek	เกาะไก่		Krabi	Mid Krabi	7°58′N 98°20′E
Ko Lapu Le	เกาะไก่		Krabi	Mid Krabi	7°58′N 98°20′E
Ko A Dang	เกาะไก่		Krabi	Mid Krabi	7°58′N 98°20′E
Ko Poda			Krabi	Mid Krabi	7°58′N 98°20′E
Ko Lanta Yai	เกาะลันตาใหญ่		Krabi	Lanta Islands	7°35′N 99°03′E
Ko Lanta Noi	เกาะลันตาน้อย		Krabi	Lanta Islands	7°35′N 99°03′E
Ko Bu Bu			Krabi	Lanta Islands	7°35′N 99°03′E
Ko Po			Krabi	Lanta Islands	7°35′N 99°03′E
Ko Klang (Krabi)			Krabi	Lanta Islands	7°35′N 99°03′E
Ko Ma			Krabi	Lanta Islands	7°35′N 99°03′E
Ko Ha			Krabi	Lanta Islands	7°35′N 99°03′E
Phuket	ภูเก็ต		Phuket		7°58′N 98°20′E
Ko Lon	เกาะโหลน		Phuket		7°58′N 98°20′E
Ko Mai Thon	เกาะไม้ท่อน		Phuket		7°58′N 98°20′E
Ko Maphrao	เกาะมะพร้าว	Coconut Island	Phuket		7°58′N 98°20′E
Ko Ngam (Phuket)	เกาะงำ		Phuket		7°58′N 98°20′E
Ko Naka Yai	เกาะนาคาใหญ่		Phuket		7°58′N 98°20′E
Ko Naka Noi	เกาะนาคาน้อย		Phuket		7°58′N 98°20′E
Ko Raet	เกาะแรด		Phuket		7°58′N 98°20′E
Ko Siray	เกาะสิเหร่		Phuket		7°58′N 98°20′E
Ko Rang Yai	เกาะรังใหญ่		Phuket		7°58′N 98°20′E
Ko Rang Noi	เกาะรังน้อย		Phuket		7°58′N 98°20′E
Ko Tapao	เกาะตะเภา		Phuket		7°58′N 98°20′E
Ko Kaeo Yai	เกาะแก้วใหญ่		Phuket		7°58′N 98°20′E
Ko Kaeo	เกาะแก้ว		Phuket		7°58′N 98°20′E
Ko Bon	เกาะบอน		Phuket		7°58′N 98°20′E
Ko Hae	เกาะเฮ	Coral Island	Phuket		7°58′N 98°20′E
Ko Aeo	เกาะแอว		Phuket		7°58′N 98°20′E

== Far southern islands ==
Name	Thai Name	Alternative spellings	Province	Island Chain, Group, Archipelago	Coordinates
Ko Hin Muang	เกาะหินม่วง		Krabi		
Ko Hin Daeng	เกาะหินแดง		Krabi		
Ko Rok Nok	เกาะรอกนอก		Krabi		
Ko Rok Nai	เกาะรอกใน		Krabi		
Ko Ngai	เกาะไหง		Krabi		7.414811° 99.154858°
Ko Kradan	เกาะกระดาน		Trang		7.308577° 99.255441°
Ko Muk	เกาะมุก	Koh Mook	Trang		7.373312° 99.295516°
Ko Racha Yai	เกาะราชาใหญ่	Koh Racha	Phuket		7.598466° 98.366353°
Ko Sukhon	เกาะสุกร		Trang		
Ko Libong	เกาะลิบง	Ko Talibong	Trang		
Ko Saray	เกาะสาหร่าย		Satun		
Ko Lao Liang			Trang		
Ko Bulon			Satun		
Ko Don			Satun		
Ko Tarutao	เกาะตะรุเตา		Satun	Tarutao - Tarutao Archipelago	
Ko Klang (Satun)	เกาะกลาง		Satun	Tarutao - Tarutao Archipelago	
Ko Lek	เกาะเหล็ก		Satun	Tarutao - Tarutao Archipelago	
Ko Adang	เกาะอาดัง		Satun	Tarutao - Adang-Rawi Archipelago	
Ko Rawi	เกาะราวี		Satun	Tarutao - Adang-Rawi Archipelago	
Ko Lipe	เกาะหลีเป๊ะ	Ko Lipeh	Satun	Tarutao - Adang-Rawi Archipelago	
Ko Dong	เกาะดง		Satun	Tarutao - Adang-Rawi Archipelago	

== Islands in rivers and lakes ==
Name	Thai Name	Alternative spellings	Province	River, Lake	Coordinates
Ko Lamphu	เกาะลำพู		Surat Thani Province	Tapi River	09.135°N 99.301°E
Ko Lamphu Rai	เกาะลำพูราย		Trat	Trat River mouth	12.2°N 102.583°E
Ko Kret	เกาะเกร็ด		Nonthaburi	Chao Phraya River	

== Largest islands of Thailand ==
These are the 10 largest islands of Thailand.

Rank	Island name	Thai name	Area (km^{2})	Area (sq mi)	Island group
1	Phuket	ภูเก็ต	543	209.65	
2	Ko Samui	เกาะสมุย	229	88	
3	Ko Chang	เกาะช้าง	211	81	
4	Ko Tarutao	เกาะตะรุเตา	152	58.68	
5	Ko Pha-ngan	เกาะพะงัน	125	48	
6	Ko Kut	เกาะกูด	105	40	
7	Ko Yao Yai	เกาะยาวใหญ่	92	35.5	
8	Ko Phra Thong	เกาะพระทอง	88	33.97	
9	Ko Lanta Yai	เกาะลันตาใหญ่	81	31	
10	Ko Yao Noi	เกาะยาว	36	13.89	

== Other Thai islands and island groups ==
- Ko Kra
- Ko Losin

== See also ==
- List of islands

== Gallery ==
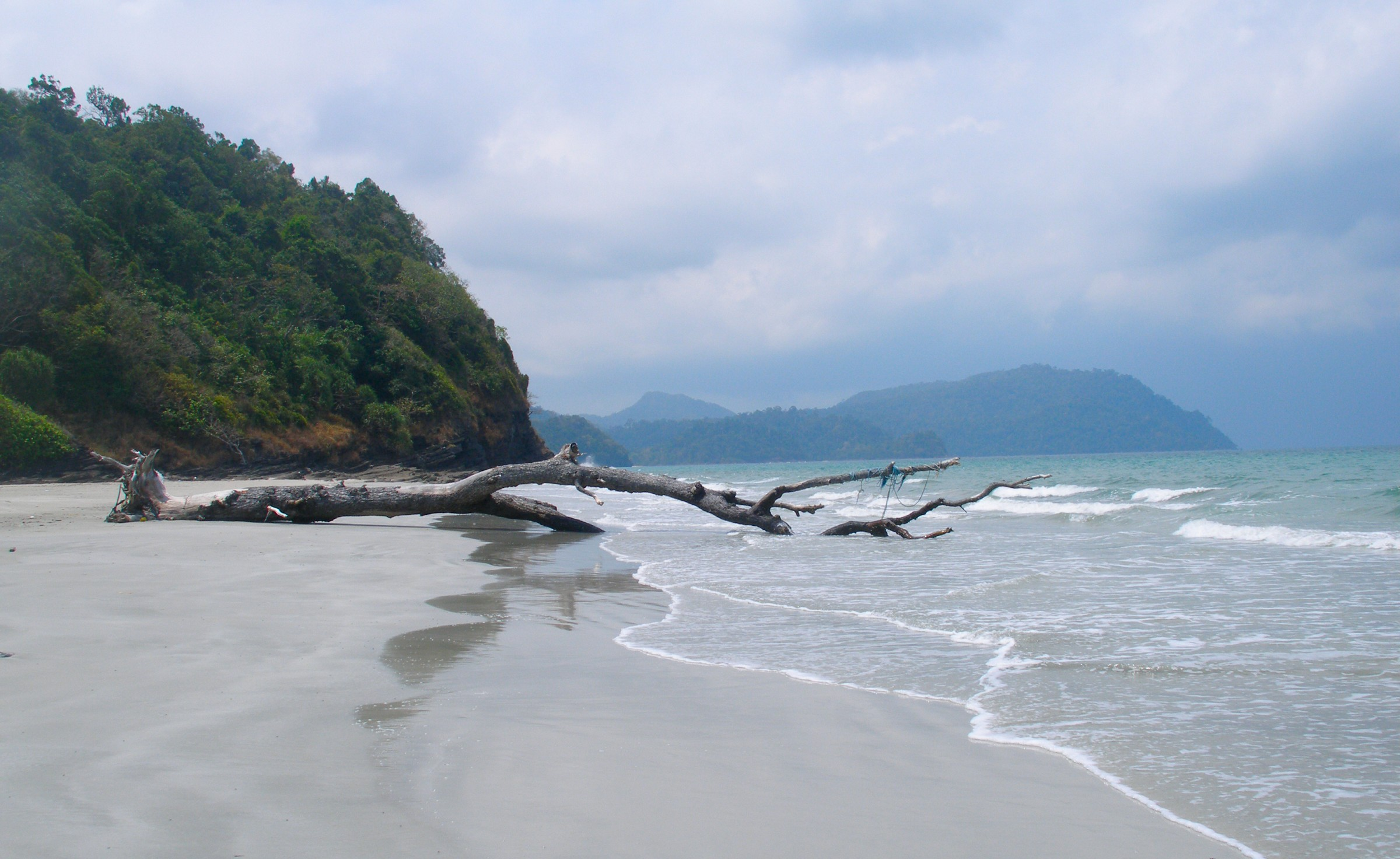
Ko Tarutao

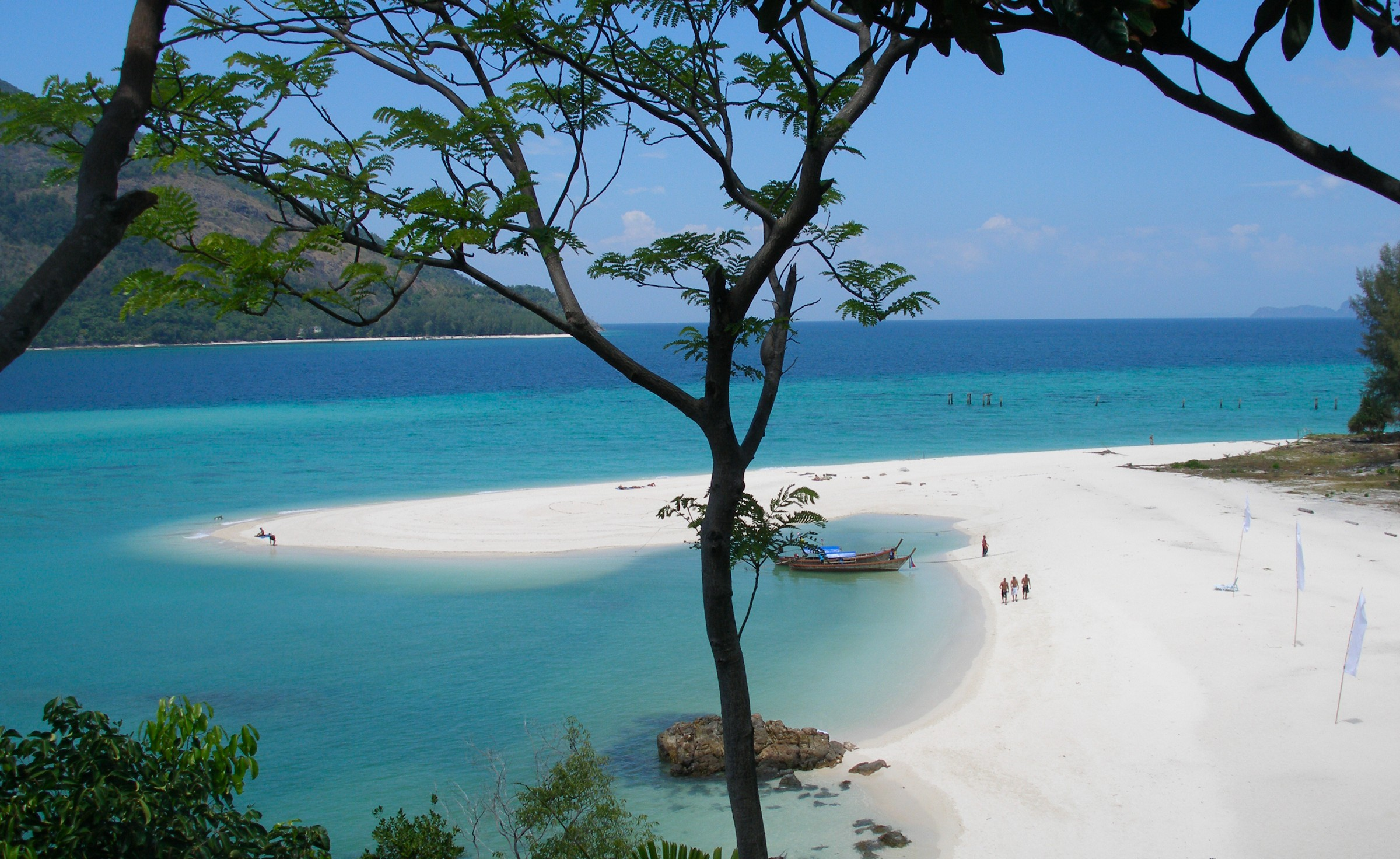
Ko Lipe

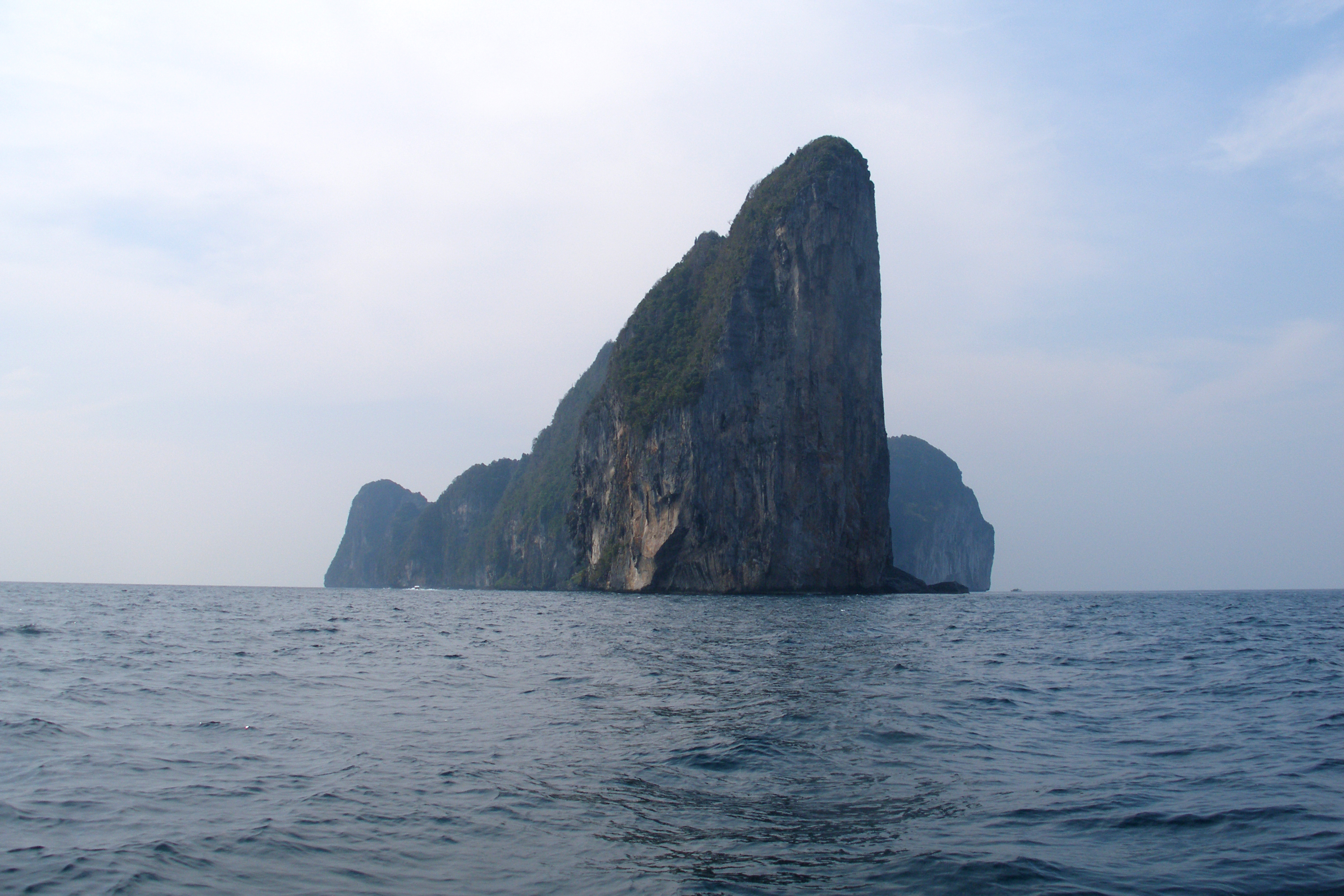
Ko Phi Phu Leh

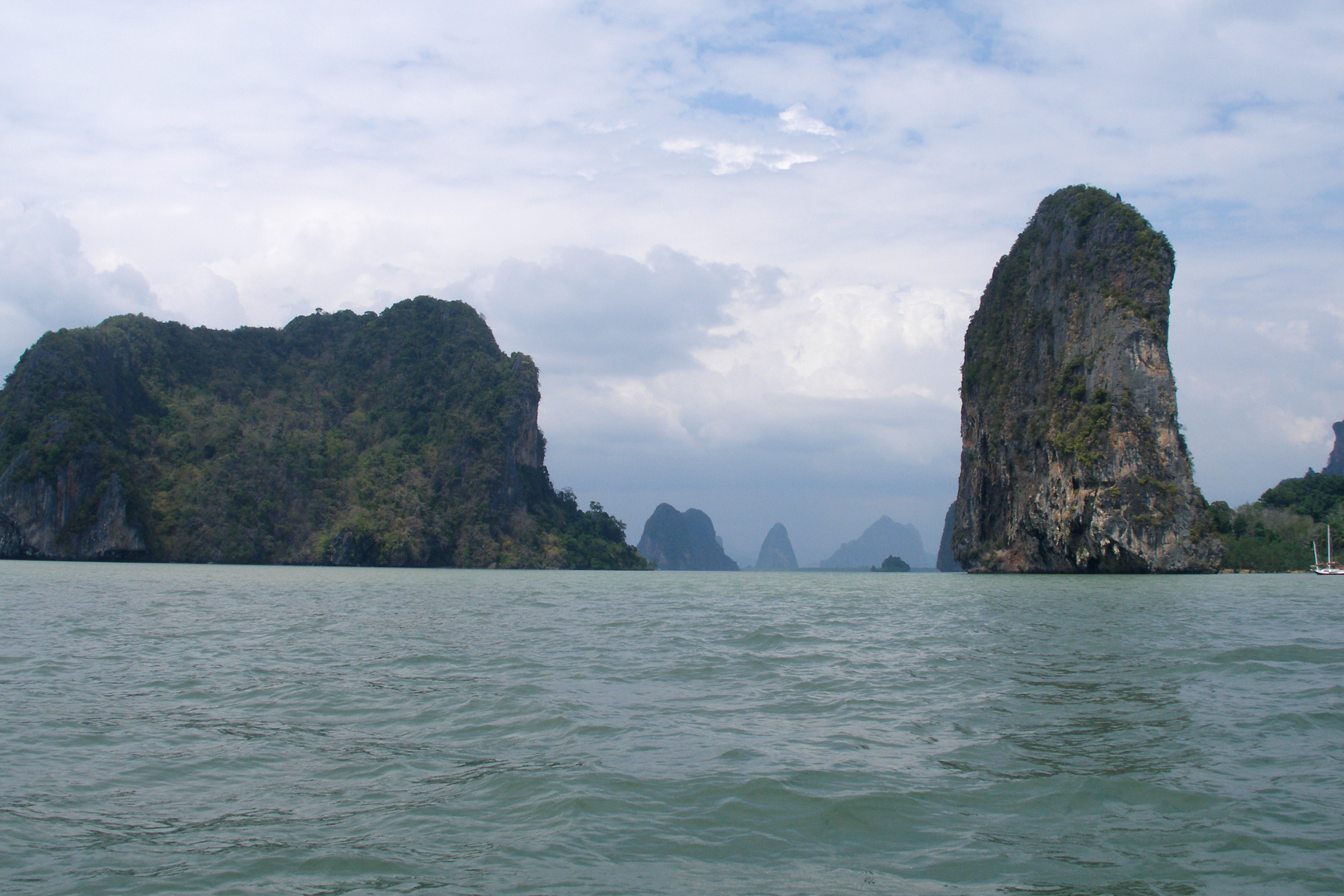
Islands of Phang Nga Bay

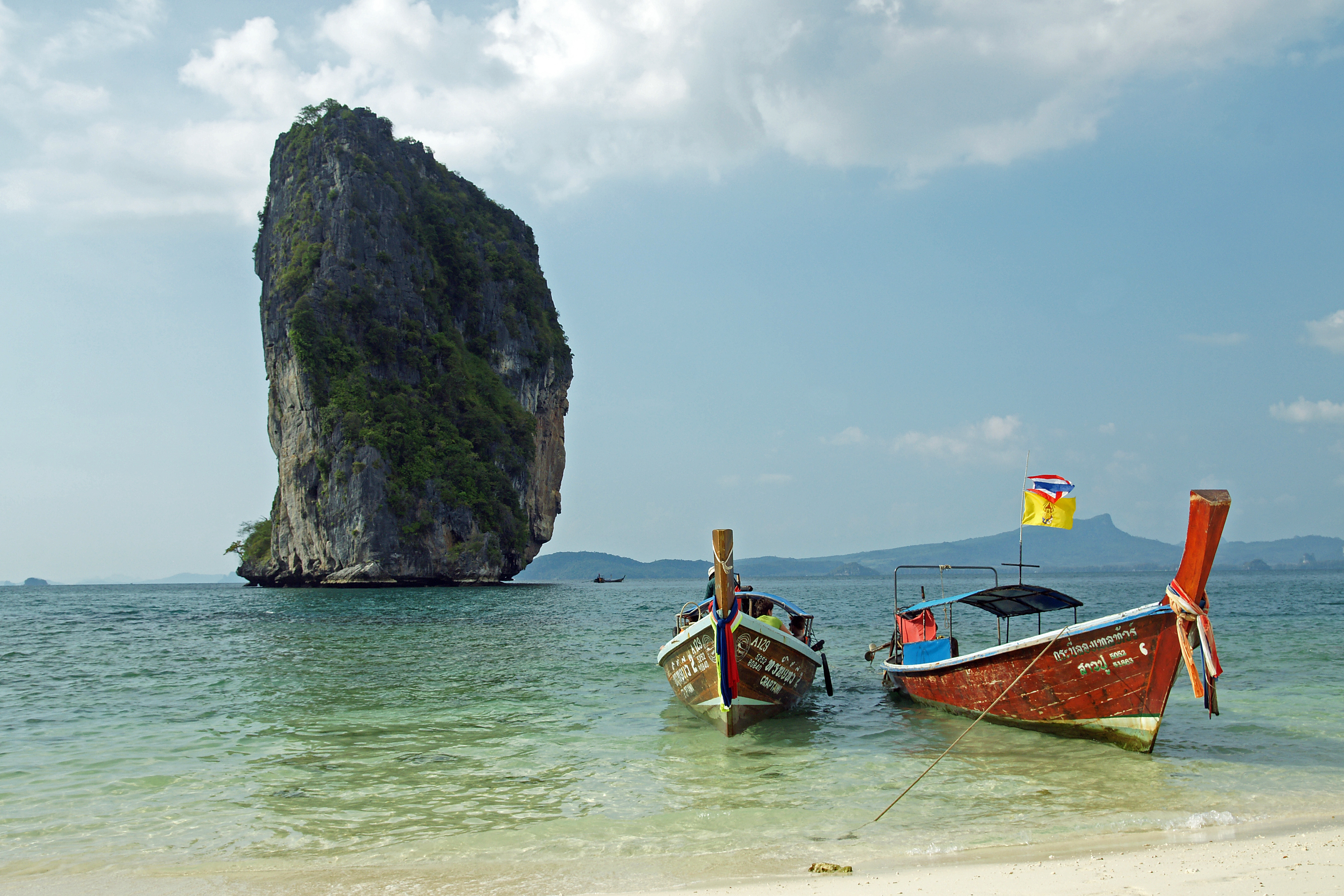
Ko Poda

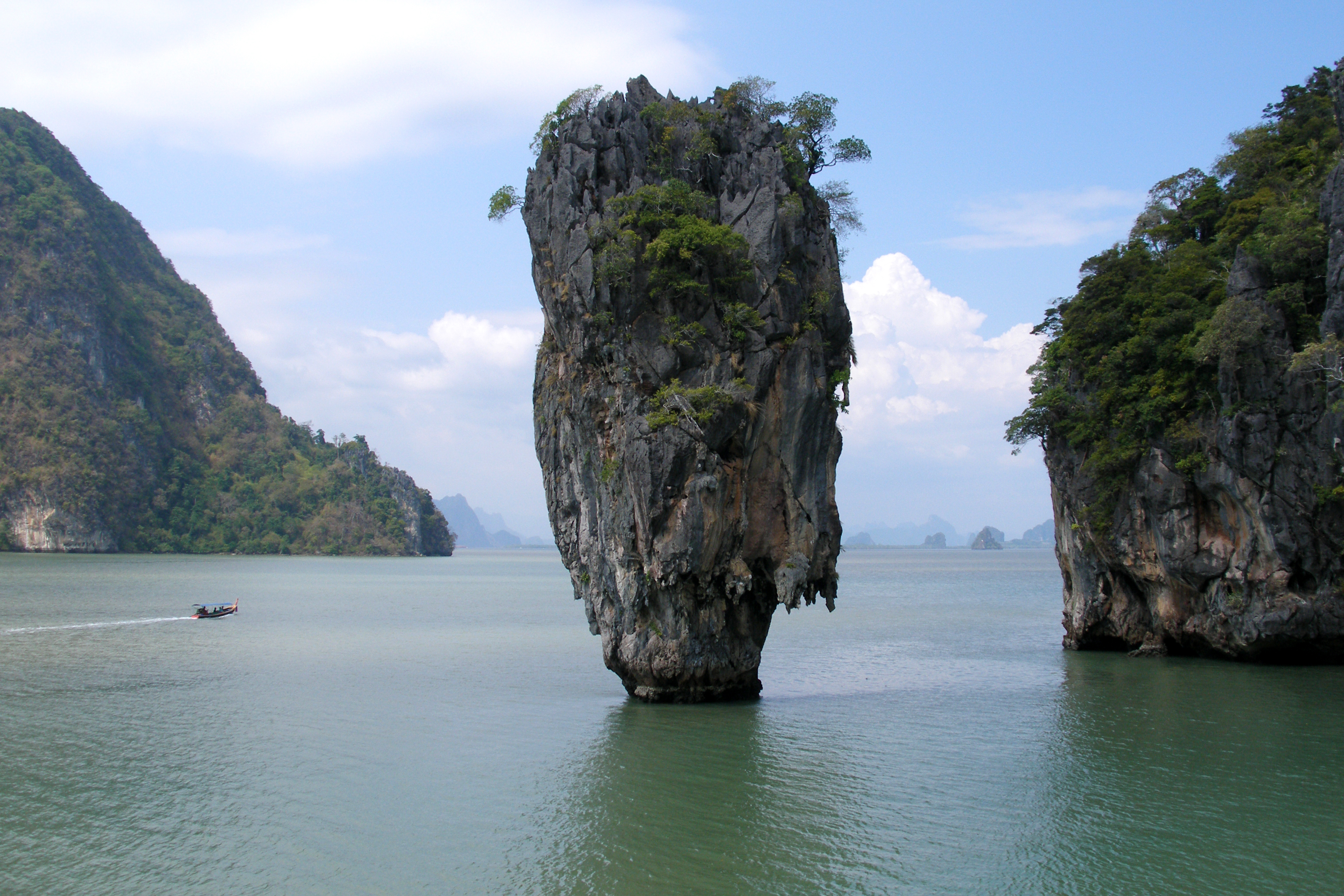
Ko Tapu

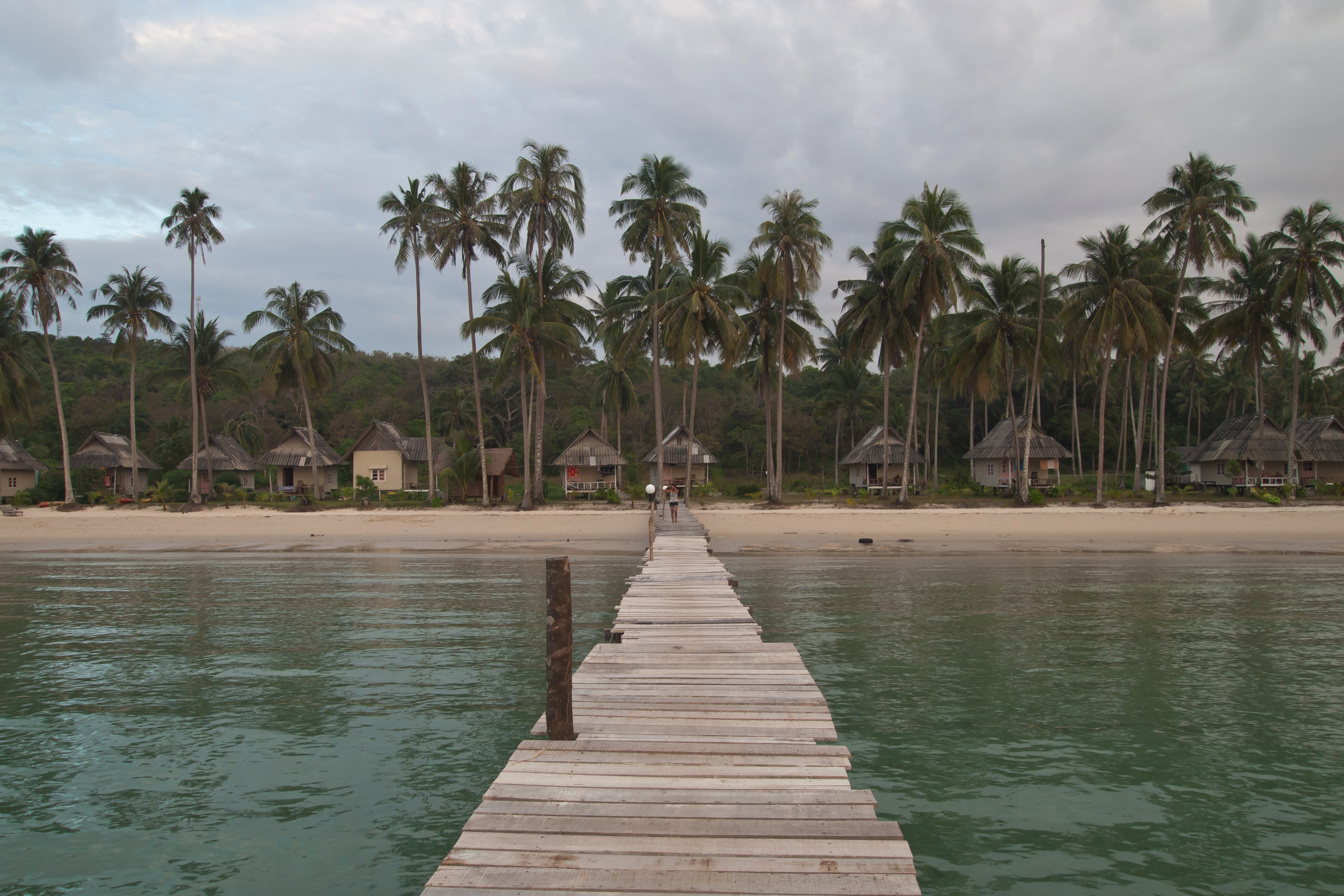
Ko Kut

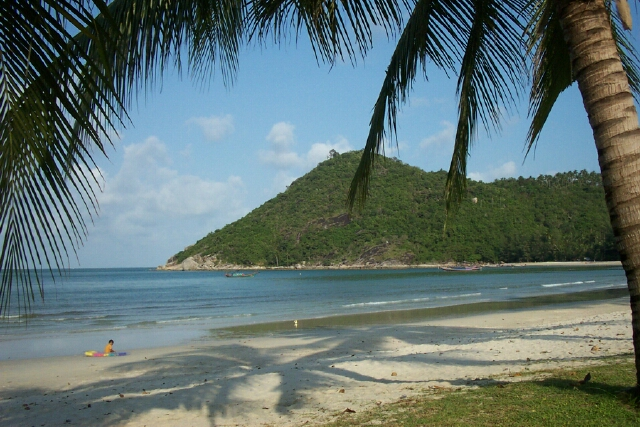
Ao Thong Nai Pan, Ko Pha Ngan

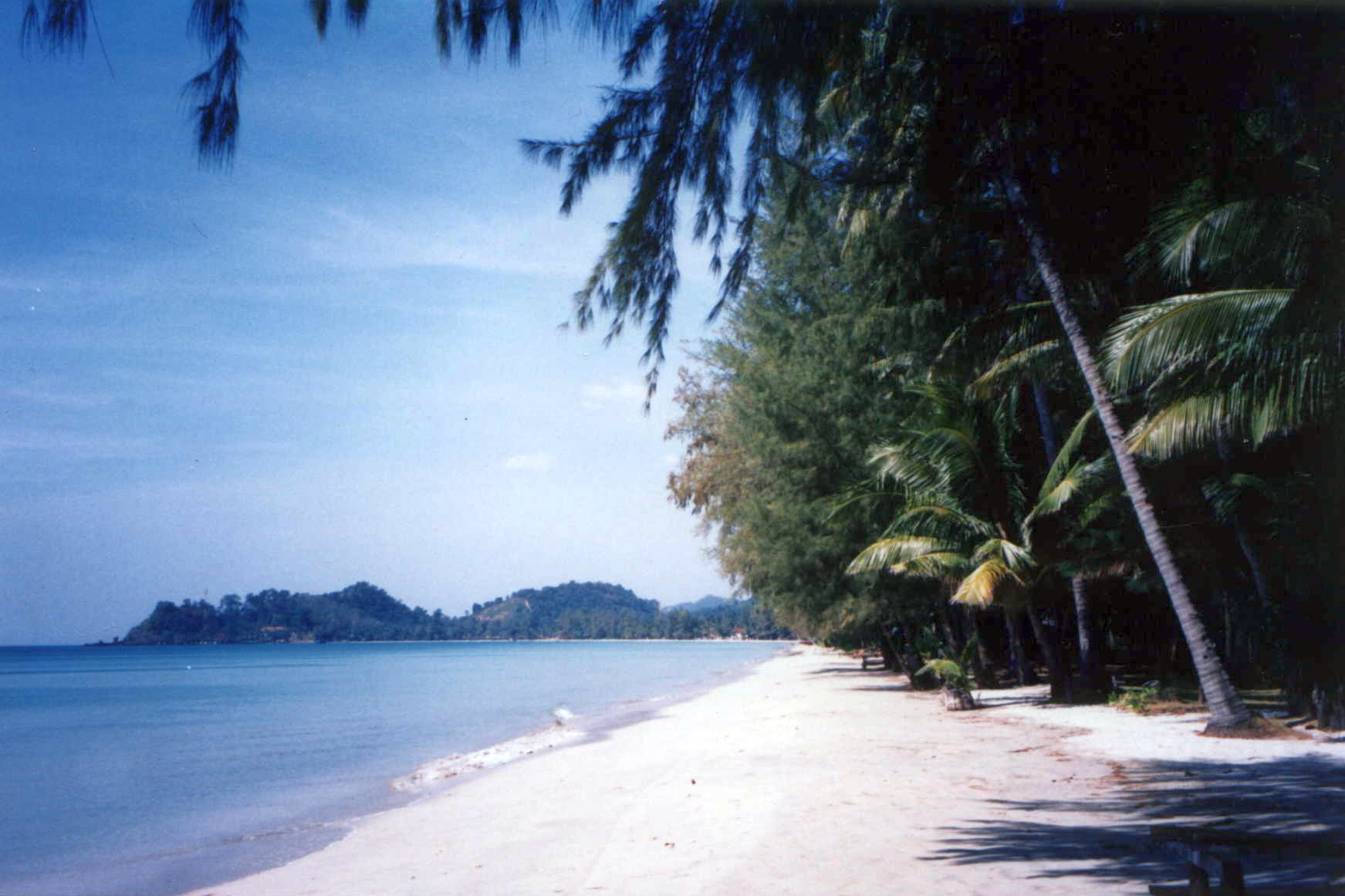
Ko Chang

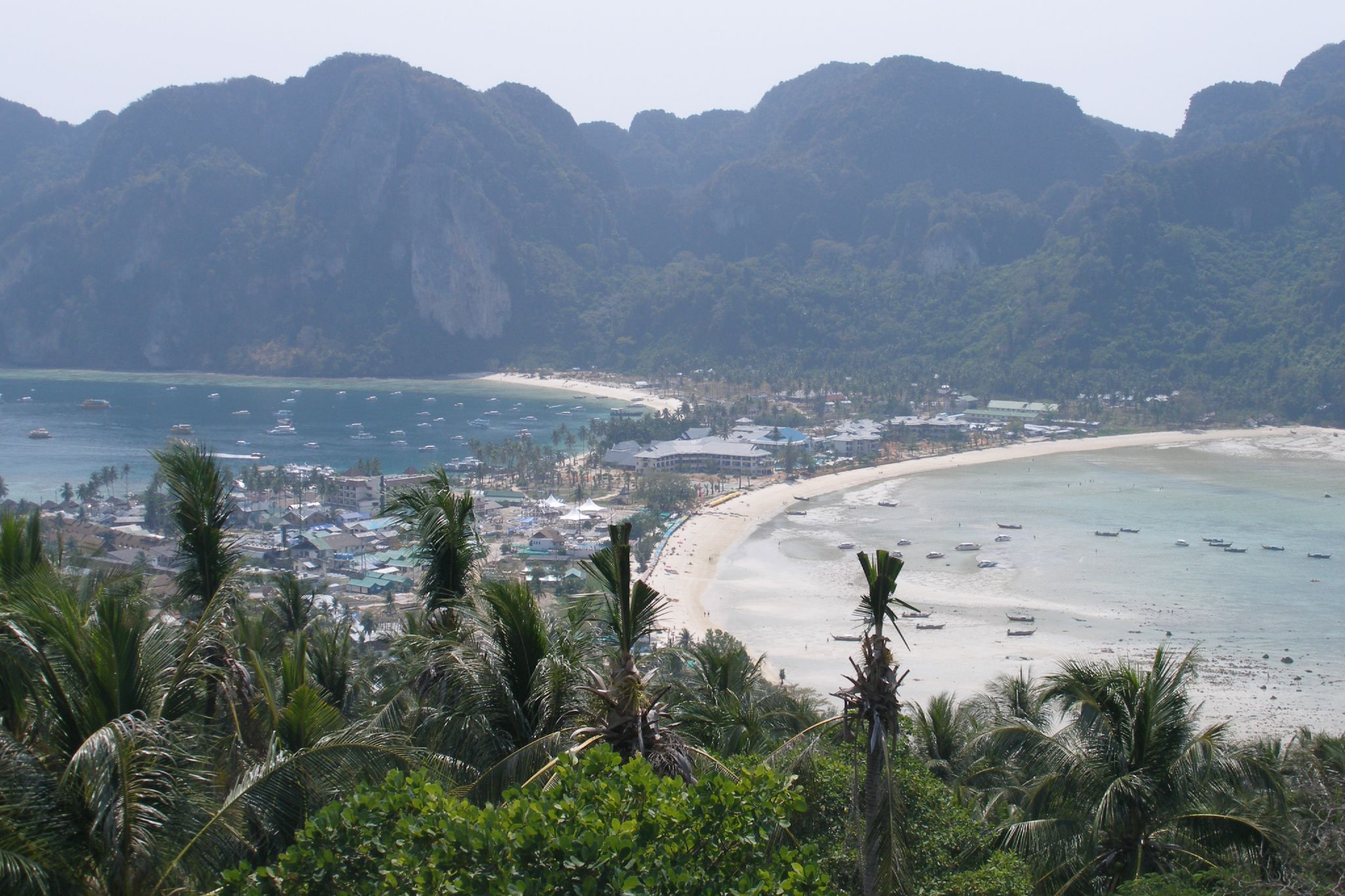
Beaches of Ko Phi Phi Don

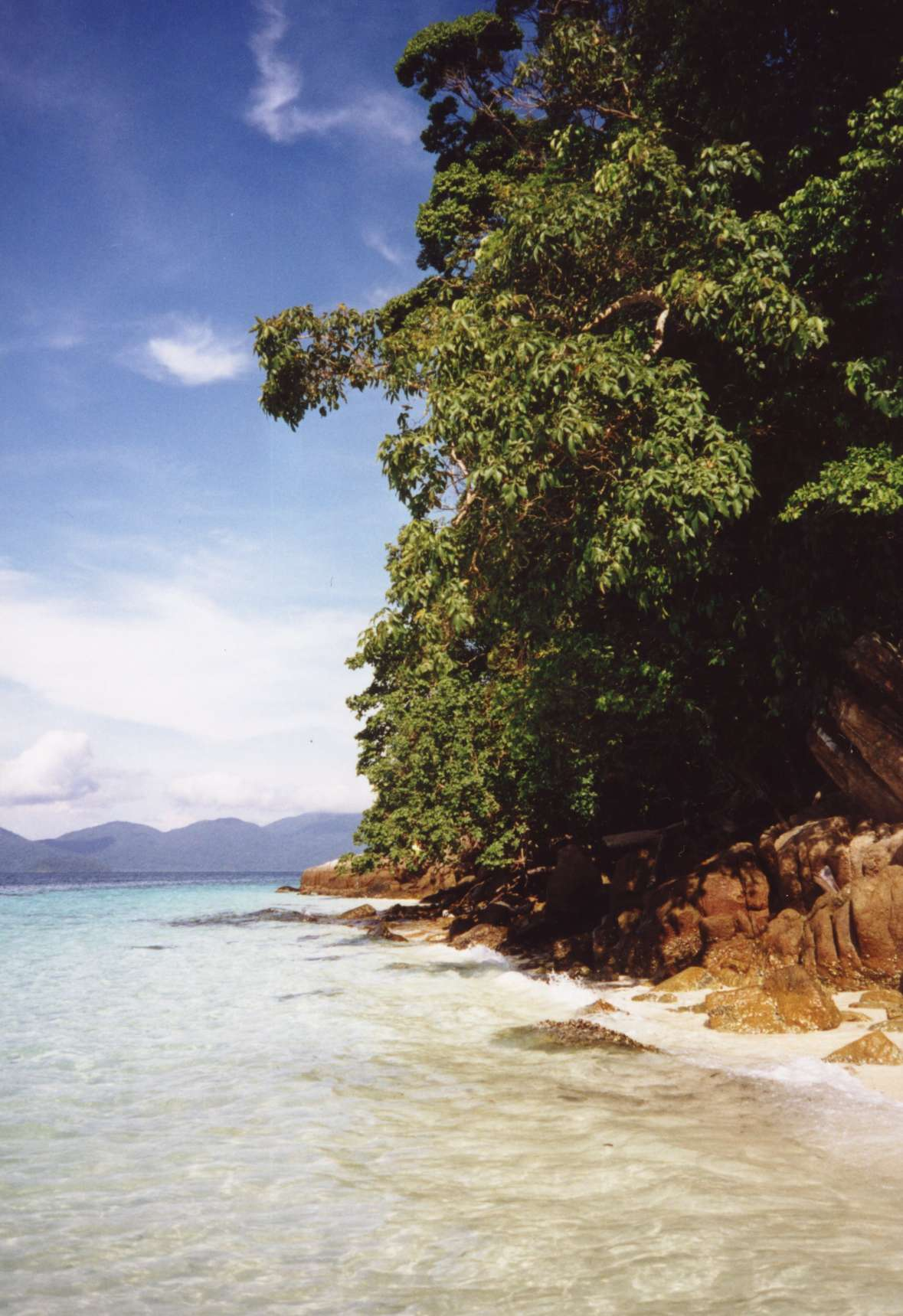
Ko Yang of the Tarutao group

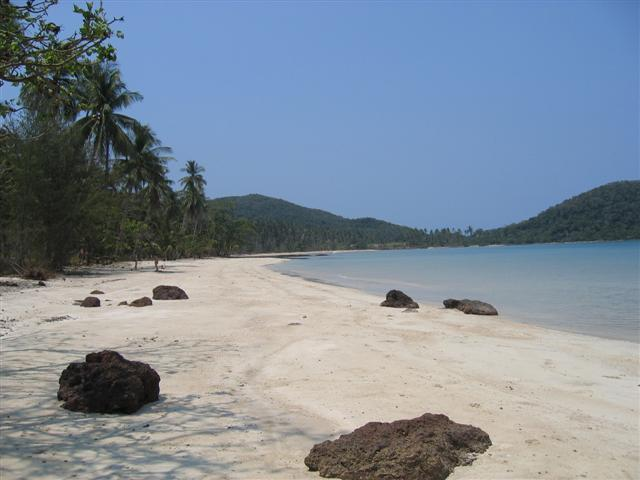
Ko Mak

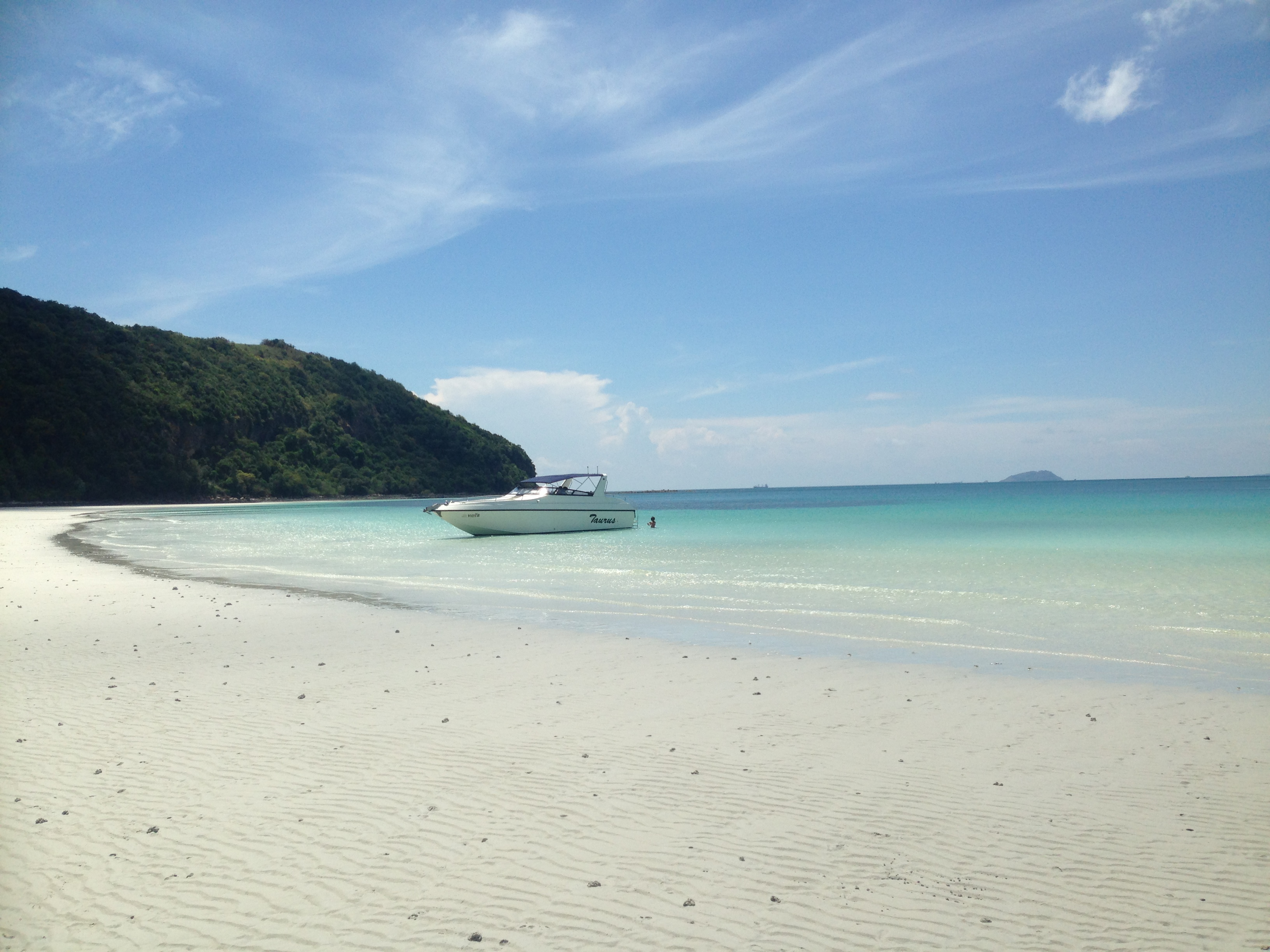
Ko Kram
