= Ko Wai =

Small Island in East Thailand

Native name: เกาะหวาย
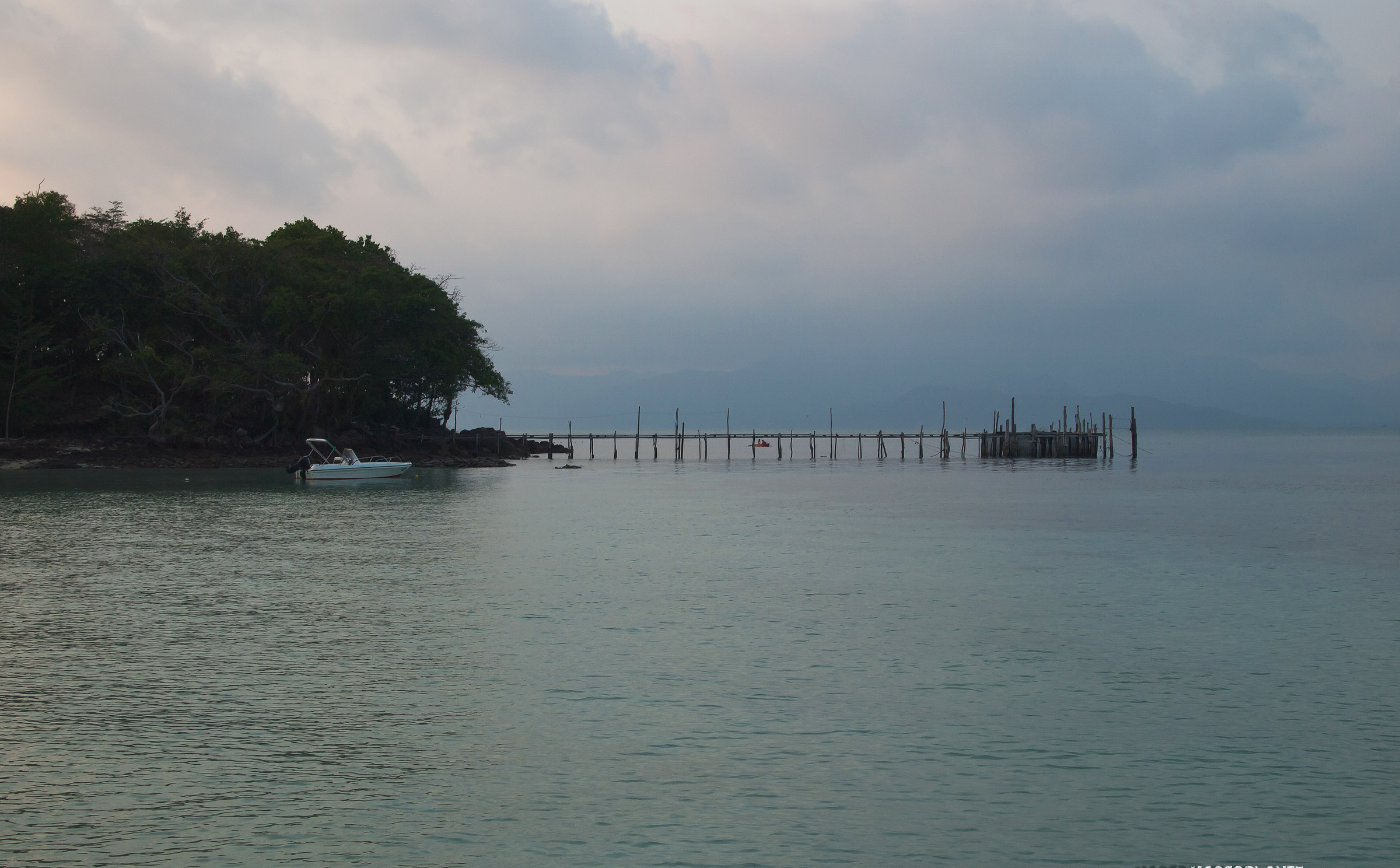
- Ko Wai, southeastern shore

- Location within Thailand

Geography
- Location: Gulf of Thailand
- Coordinates: 11°54′N 102°24′E
- Area: 3.9 km^{2} (1.5 sq mi)
- Length: 3 km (1.9 mi)

Administration
- Thailand
- Province: Trat

Ko Wai (Thai: เกาะหวาย) is a small island in Ko Chang Archipelago, Trat Province, eastern Thailand.

The island has nice views over the other islands in the vicinity.

== Geography ==
Ko Wai Island has an irregular shape and is 3 km long and 1 km wide at the widest point. The east part of the island is encircled by coral reef and has sand beaches while the west part is more rugged and hilly, and serves as a nesting ground for birds. The interior is covered by forest jungle. There are four bungalow operations on the island and daily boat connections to Ko Chang, Ko Mak, and the mainland, during the season.

== Ecology ==
The island is a protected area and it is part of Mu Ko Chang National Park.

== See also ==
- List of islands of Thailand
