= Ko Sai =

Ko Sai เกาะทราย
- Island
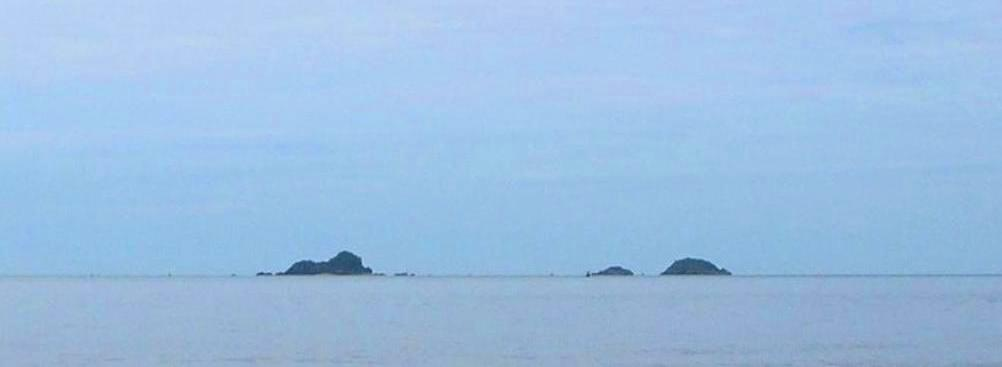
- Ko Sai island (left) seen from the shore. Ko Khi Nok (center) and Ko Sadao island (right) are smaller.

- Location within Thailand
- Coordinates: 12°29′N 100°0′E
- Country: Thailand
- Province: Prachuap Khiri Khan
- Amphoe: Hua Hin
- Elevation: 35 m (115 ft)

Ko Sai (Thai: เกาะทราย, pronounced [kɔ̀ʔ sāːj]) is one of the gulf islands of Thailand. It lies on the west side of the Gulf of Thailand, about 2 km off-shore.

== Geography ==
Ko Sai is the largest of a group of three rocky islets also known as "Pran Rocks", off the fishing village of Khao Takiab, just south of Hua Hin. This area belongs administratively to Prachuap Khiri Khan Province.

Ko Sai has a maximum length of 0.4 km and its highest point reaches 35 m. Ko Sai vaguely resembles a sitting lion when seen from shore. Local tour operators call it "Lion Island" (Ko Singto) and organize regular sightseeing and snorkeling excursions to visit it.

=== Adjacent islands ===
Two smaller islets are close to Ko Sai:

- Ko Sadao (เกาะสะเดา), south of Ko Sai. Its highest point 15m. This island is called "Ko Tao" (Turtle Island) by the travel agencies in the area, but it should not be confused with Ko Tao in Surat Thani Province.
- Ko Khi Nok (เกาะขี้นก), is the smallest of the group. It is just a few hundred metres to the east of Ko Sadao. This is the lowest island and its name in Thai means "Guano Island". Its highest point is only 3 m and, unlike the other two islets, it barely has any vegetation. Ko Khi Nok is called "Ko Nok" (Bird Island) by the local tour organizers, but like the other alternative names above, it is not to be found in official documents.

== See also ==
- List of islands of Thailand
