= Ko Nom Sao =

Islands in Phang Nga Bay, Thailand

Native name: เกาะนมสาว
- Interactive map of Ko Nom Sao

Geography
- Location: Strait of Malacca
- Coordinates: 8.312313°N 98.517154°E
- Area: 0.012 km^{2} (0.0046 sq mi)
- Highest elevation: 10 m (30 ft)

Administration
- Thailand
- Province: Phang Nga
- District: Mueang Phang Nga
- Tambon: Ko Panyi

Ko Nom Sao (Thai: เกาะนมสาว, lit. female breast island) are twin islands in Phang Nga Bay, and are part of the Ko Panyi (เกาะปันหยี) subdistrict (tambon), Phang Nga Province, Thailand.

== General ==
Ko Nom Sao is a geographical feature consisting of two small islands of similar appearance located close to each other. One of them, Ko Nom Sao Yai (เกาะนมสาวใหญ่), is slightly larger than the other, but from certain angles the silhouette of these islands looks like a pair of roughly identical woman's breasts.

These islands are also known as Ko Ok Meri.

== Similarly named features ==
- Ko Nom Sao, in Khao Sam Roi Yot area, Prachuap Khiri Khan. 12°13′N 100°01′E
- Ko Nom Sao, an island off the shore in Chanthaburi Province. 12°28′N 102°01′E

== See also ==
- List of islands of Thailand
- Breast-shaped hill
