= Ao Manao =

Ao Manao อ่าวมะนาว
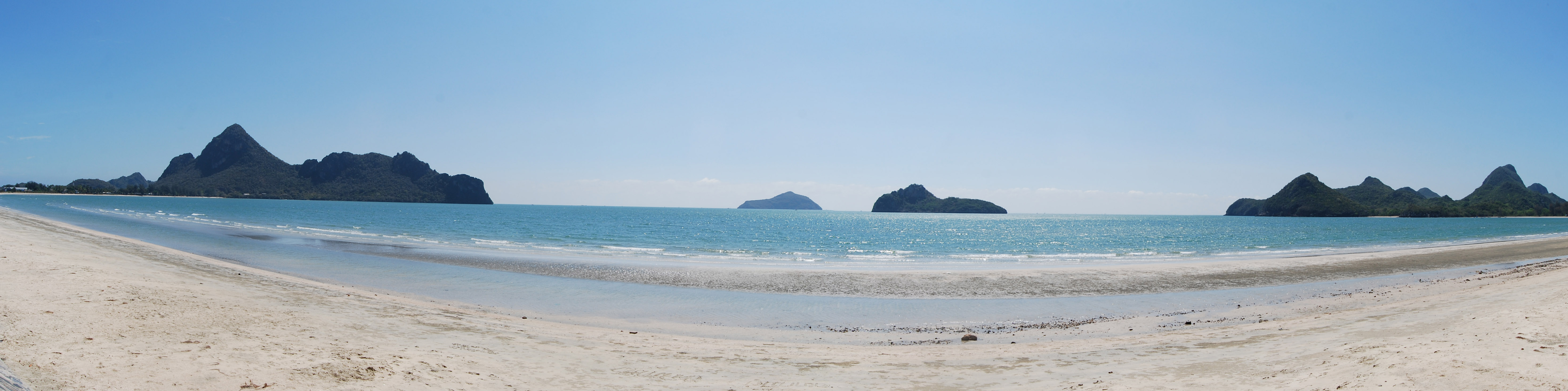
- Ao Manao from the beach with the northern headland on the left and the southern on the right, as well as Ko Lueam and Ko Aen islands.

- Location off the coast of Thailand
- Coordinates: 11°46′30″N 99°48′20″E
- Type: Marine bay
- Primary outflows: Gulf of Siam
- Basin countries: Thailand

Ao Manao (Thai: อ่าวมะนาว, pronounced [ʔàːw mā.nāːw]), meaning "Lime Bay", is a bay in the west side of the Gulf of Thailand. It is five kilometres to the south of Prachuap Khiri Khan in Prachuap Khiri Khan Province.

== Geography ==
The bay lies south of Prachuap Bay. It is open towards the east and is bounded by steep limestone outcrops forming peninsulas to the north and to the south. There are two islands in the bay, Ko Lueam about 3.6 km offshore, and smaller Ko Aen, about 1.5 km off the beach within the bay.

Ao Manao has a good beach which is a popular tourist destination. It can be reached by road through the Wing 5 Royal Thai Air Force base.

Besides, at Khao Lommuak, a viewpoint hill of this place. It is also a habitat for over 200 dusky leaf monkeys. They behave politely, not as aggressive as the monkeys or langurs in other tourist spots, tourists can feed them.

== See also ==
- Battle of Prachuap Khiri Khan
- List of islands of Thailand
