= Mu Ko Siboya =

Island group in Thailand

Coordinates: 7°54′N 99°0′E

Mu Ko Siboya, also known as Ko Siboya Tambon, is a group of islands which is part of Nuea Khlong District in Krabi Province, Thailand. The islands are located 15–30 kilometers south of Krabi town on the Andaman Sea.

- The biggest city is Ban Ko Siboya, on the island with the same name.
- The population (4,920 in 2013) relies on rubber plantations, agriculture and tourism.
- The islands are relaxed and not crowded like the near Mu Ko Phi Phi.
- Ko Daeng, a small island with restricted access, is the site of Krabi's waste plantation and dump.
- Ko Siboya is the 2nd biggest in size, and most populated. Most people are working in rubber plantations around the island.
- Ko Jum is the biggest island, where all the resorts are located. It is also known as Ko Pu.
- Ko Cham To Lang was recently acquired by a big resort concern and will slowly be also developed and have tourism in it.

== Table of Islands ==
Nr	Island	Capital	Other Cities	Area (ha)	Population (Note: The Islands area and population data retrieved from the 2012 census)
1	Ko To Lang	Ban Ko To Lang		243	10
2	Ko Daeng	Ko Daeng station		162	2
3	Ko Hang	Ko Hang	Song, Phru Si-Bong	1526	285
4	Ko Jum	Ban Ko Jum	Ko Pu, Ting Rai	2071	2200
5	Ko Ka	Ao Ko Ka		9.2	0
6	Ko Lu Du	Ko Lu Du		657	0
7	Ko Nok Khom	Ban Ko Nok Khom		240	20
8	Ko Siboya	Ban Ko Siboya	Laem Soma, Klong Toh, Lang Koh, Tang Mai Pai	1626	2400
9	Other Islands	Ko Si Ma	Ko Yanat, Ko Lek	150	0
	Mu Ko Siboya	Ban Ko Siboya	Ban Ko Jum, Ban Ko Pu	6700	4920
