= Prachuap Bay =

- อ่าวประจวบ (Thai)
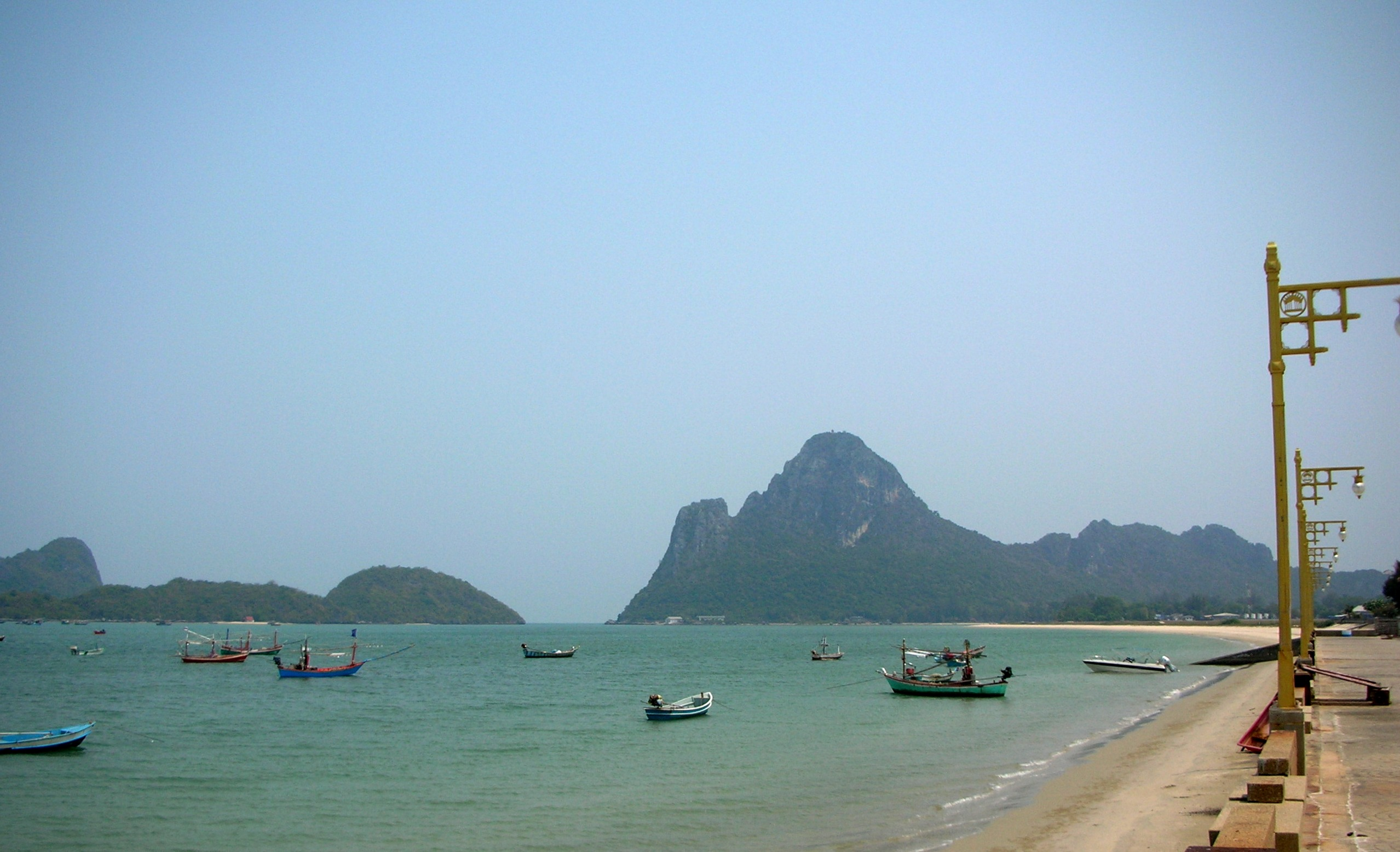
- Prachuap Bay

- Location off the coast of Thailand
- Coordinates: 11°48′50″N 99°48′50″E
- Type: Marine bay
- Primary outflows: Gulf of Siam
- Basin countries: Thailand
- Max. length: 8 km (5.0 mi)
- Settlements: Prachuap Khiri Khan

Prachuap Bay (Thai: อ่าวประจวบ, RTGS: Ao Prachuap, pronounced [ʔàːw prā.tɕùap]) is a bay in the west side of the Gulf of Siam or Gulf of Thailand. It lies off Prachuap Khiri Khan town, Prachuap Khiri Khan Province.

== Geography ==
Prachuap Bay lies north of Ao Manao and south of Ao Noi. It is open towards the east and is bound by steep limestone outcrops forming peninsulas to the north, at Khao Ta Mong Lai and to the south at Khao Lom Muak. There are four islands in the bay area, Ko Lak, Ko La, and Ko Rom towards the southern end of the mouth of the bay, and larger Ko Raet further off-shore.

Ko Lak Island in Prachuap Bay was the historic center of administration of Prachuap Khiri Khan Province and its silhouette appears on the provincial seal.

== See also ==
- West Coast Islands (Gulf of Thailand)
