= Ko Phai =

Ko Phai เกาะไผ่
- Island
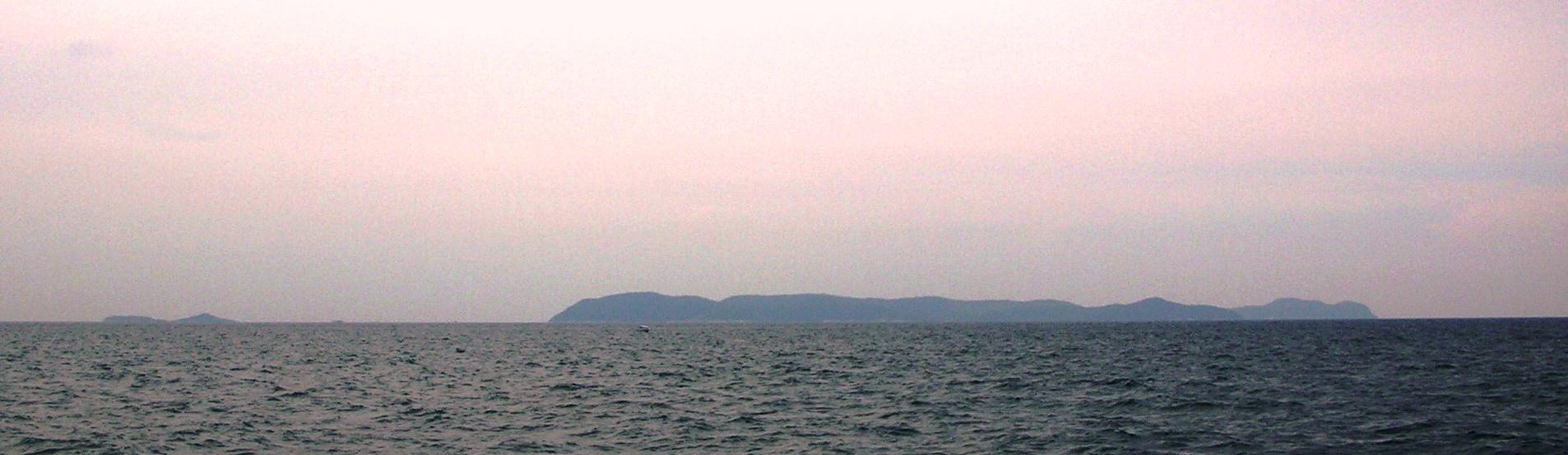
- Ko Phai from the east. Ko Luam can be seen on the right, overlapped by Ko Phai. Ko Klung Badan is the silhouette on the left.

- Location within Thailand
- Coordinates: 12°56′0″N 100°40′30″E
- Country: Thailand
- Province: Chonburi Province
- Amphoe: Amphoe Bang Lamung
- Elevation GoogleEarth: 151 m (495 ft)

Ko Phai (Thai: เกาะไผ่, pronounced [kɔ̀ʔ pʰàj]) is the largest island in Mu Ko Phai (หมู่เกาะไผ่), a small uninhabited archipelago on the eastern seaboard of Thailand. It is about 21 km to the west of Pattaya. It is also known as "Koh Pai". It is also mentioned as "Bamboo Island", the meaning of its name in Thai, in tourist guides.

== Geography ==
Ko Phai is almost four kilometres in length and its maximum width is about one and a half kilometres. It is a craggy wooded island and a great part of its coast is formed by rocky cliffs even if some sandy beaches are present in the northern and eastern sides. The whole island is high, but its highest point is only 150 m and there is not a single peak dominating the others. There is a lighthouse on the summit of the island.

This island is at the southeastern end of the Bay of Bangkok, on the east side of the Gulf of Siam. Administratively Ko Phai belongs to the Amphoe Bang Lamung, Chonburi Province.

The closest land to the Ko Phai group is Ko Lan, about 14 km to the east of Ko Phai's eastern shore. These islands can be reached in about two hours by boat from south Pattaya harbor. All these islands are a protected natural area under the supervision of the Royal Thai Navy. Visitors must bring their own food and water. No overnight stays are permitted on Ko Phai.

== Adjacent islands ==
Other islands of the group include:

- Ko Luam, or Ko Lueam, (เกาะเหลื่อม) is a high rocky island wooded at the top much like Ko Phai. Its highest point is 135 m. It is to the northwest of the main island. Ko Luam has a small islet, Ko Luam Noi, off its east coast.
- Ko Man Wichai (เกาะมารวิชัย), two kilometres in length with a high point of 64 m
- Ko Klueng Badan (เกาะกลึงบาดาล), highest point 50 m
- Ko Hu Chang (เกาะหูช้าง) a small islet.

== Scuba diving ==
One of the main attractions of the island group are some well-preserved coral reefs. A World War II-vintage ship of the Royal Thai Navy, HTMS Khram (ex-USS LSM-469), was sunk 300 m to the east of Ko Phai in January 2003 in order to create an artificial submerged reef. The wreck is in an area suitable for scuba diving.

== See also ==
- List of islands of Thailand
