= Ko Loi =

Island in Thailand

Ko Loi เกาะลอย Loi Island
- Island
- Ko Loi Si Racha เกาะลอยศรีราชา
- Ko Loi Public Park

- Location within Thailand
- Coordinates: 13°10′28″N 100°55′12″E
- Country: Thailand
- Province: Chonburi
- Highest elevation: 20 m (66 ft)
- Lowest elevation: 0 m (0 ft)

Population
  - Total: 0
- Time zone: UTC+7 (ICT)
- Area code: (+66) 77

Ko Loi in 1947

Ko Loi (Thai: เกาะลอย, pronounced [kɔ̀ lɔːj]), also spelled Koh Loi, is a small coastal island and public park located in the Gulf of Thailand off the coast of Si Racha, in Si Racha, Chonburi, Thailand. It is connect to the mainland by the Chaophraya Surasakmontri Bridge, which is named after Chaophraya Surasakmontri. It is one of the piers to travel to Ko Sichang.

== History ==
Ko Loi is a small island that rose from the coastal waters of the Gulf of Thailand. Local fishermen and coastal residents frequently visited its shores for a breaktime. It later transformed into a landmark in the late 19th century when in 1899, royal people such as Savang Vadhana, half-sister and wife of Chulalongkorn documented the island's unique topography. During her travels along the eastern seashore, the Queen visited the area to convalesce. Her visit made an attention to Si Racha's coastline for religious and cultural structures on the islet.

In 1908, the Sri Maharacha Company, a logging and sawmill enterprise undertook a massive infrastructure project to make shipping operations easier. To bypass the coastal mudshore, workers constructed a long wooden pier and a narrow railway bridge, which connects to the mainland directly to Ko Loi. This allowes the heavy timber logs to be hauled across the sea and loaded onto cargo ships anchored in deeper waters off the island's coast. However, in 1940, a storm hit Chonburi and made the bridges of the island collapse. The company later used some spare rafts to build a new bridge.

In 1965, the wooden raft bridges were replaced with a solid rock path that permanently linked the island to the mainland town. The surrounding land was developed into a public park for the locals near the island. In 2016, Wittaya Khunpluem, politician and the head of Provincial administrative organization of Chonburi launched a major reconstruction project to renovate the island until in 2018, the island got a new look and a new pier for a ferry gateway to Ko Sichang.

== Geography ==
Ko Loi is a small island that sits in the Gulf of Thailand, approximately about 500 to 700 meters off the mainland coast of Si Racha in Chonburi. The island spans a total area of 6,400 square kilometer. The island used to be separated from the mainland by the Gulf of Thailand sea, but now, the island is now permanently connected with the Chao Phraya Surasakmontri Bridge. The island's geography has a steep southern cliff hill place with a multi-tiered Buddhist temple complex, flat public park along its lower ground, and a coastal ferry pier for routes to Ko Sichang.

=== Climate ===
Ko Loi experiences a tropical monsoon climate according to the Köppen climate classification

Climate data for Ko Loi, Si Racha
Month	Jan	Feb	Mar	Apr	May	Jun	Jul	Aug	Sep	Oct	Nov	Dec	Year
Record high °C (°F)	34.8 (94.6)	36.2 (97.2)	37.5 (99.5)	38.6 (101.5)	38.0 (100.4)	36.8 (98.2)	36.2 (97.2)	36.0 (96.8)	35.2 (95.4)	34.5 (94.1)	33.8 (92.8)	33.5 (92.3)	38.6 (101.5)
Mean daily maximum °C (°F)	31.0 (87.8)	31.8 (89.2)	33.0 (91.4)	34.2 (93.6)	33.5 (92.3)	32.8 (91.0)	32.2 (90.0)	32.0 (89.6)	31.5 (88.7)	31.0 (87.8)	30.8 (87.4)	30.5 (86.9)	32.0 (89.6)
Daily mean °C (°F)	26.8 (80.2)	27.5 (81.5)	28.8 (83.8)	29.8 (85.6)	29.5 (85.1)	28.9 (84.0)	28.5 (83.3)	28.3 (82.9)	27.8 (82.0)	27.2 (81.0)	26.9 (80.4)	26.5 (79.7)	28.0 (82.4)
Mean daily minimum °C (°F)	23.0 (73.4)	23.8 (74.8)	25.0 (77.0)	26.2 (79.2)	26.0 (78.8)	25.5 (77.9)	25.0 (77.0)	24.9 (76.8)	24.4 (75.9)	24.0 (75.2)	23.5 (74.3)	22.5 (72.5)	24.5 (76.1)
Record low °C (°F)	18.5 (65.3)	20.0 (68.0)	21.5 (70.7)	23.5 (74.3)	24.0 (75.2)	23.5 (74.3)	23.0 (73.4)	23.0 (73.4)	22.5 (72.5)	21.5 (70.7)	19.5 (67.1)	18.0 (64.4)	18.0 (64.4)
Average precipitation mm (inches)	10.2 (0.40)	18.5 (0.73)	32.0 (1.26)	65.0 (2.56)	155.0 (6.10)	175.0 (6.89)	170.0 (6.69)	180.0 (7.09)	245.0 (9.65)	205.0 (8.07)	48.0 (1.89)	8.5 (0.33)	1,312.2 (51.66)
Average precipitation days (≥ 1.0 mm)	1.2	1.8	3.0	5.5	11.5	13.5	13.5	14.5	16.5	12.5	3.5	0.8	89.3
Source: Thailand Meteorological Department

== Tourism ==
Ko Loi serves as one of the major tourist destinations of Si Racha such as:

- Wat Ko Loi Si Maharacha: Perched on the island's rocky southern cliffside, the historic temple draws Buddhist and Taoist practitioners alike. Visitors climb a prominent flight of stairs lined with dragon architectural motifs to reach the upper terraces.
- Wat Ko Loi Si Maha Racha: An octagonal Chinese pavilion with a white jade statue of Guanyin. Located in the northwest of the island.
- Ko Loi Public Park: Located in the northwest of the island, infront of the temple. The floor of the park is blue, used for jogging and exercise.
- Green sea turtle Pond: Preservation pond of Green sea turtles. Loctaed in the southwest of the island.
- Ko Sichang Ferry Gateway: The only pier on the island. The pier connects from the island to Ko Sichang.

== In popular culture ==
Ko Loi was mentioned in Si Racha's motto "ซอสพริกอร่อย เกาะลอยงามล้ำ อุตสาหกรรมรุ่งเรือง เมืองเจ้าพระยาสุรศักดิ์ อนุรักษ์เต่าทะเล ประเพณีกองข้าว".

== Gallery ==
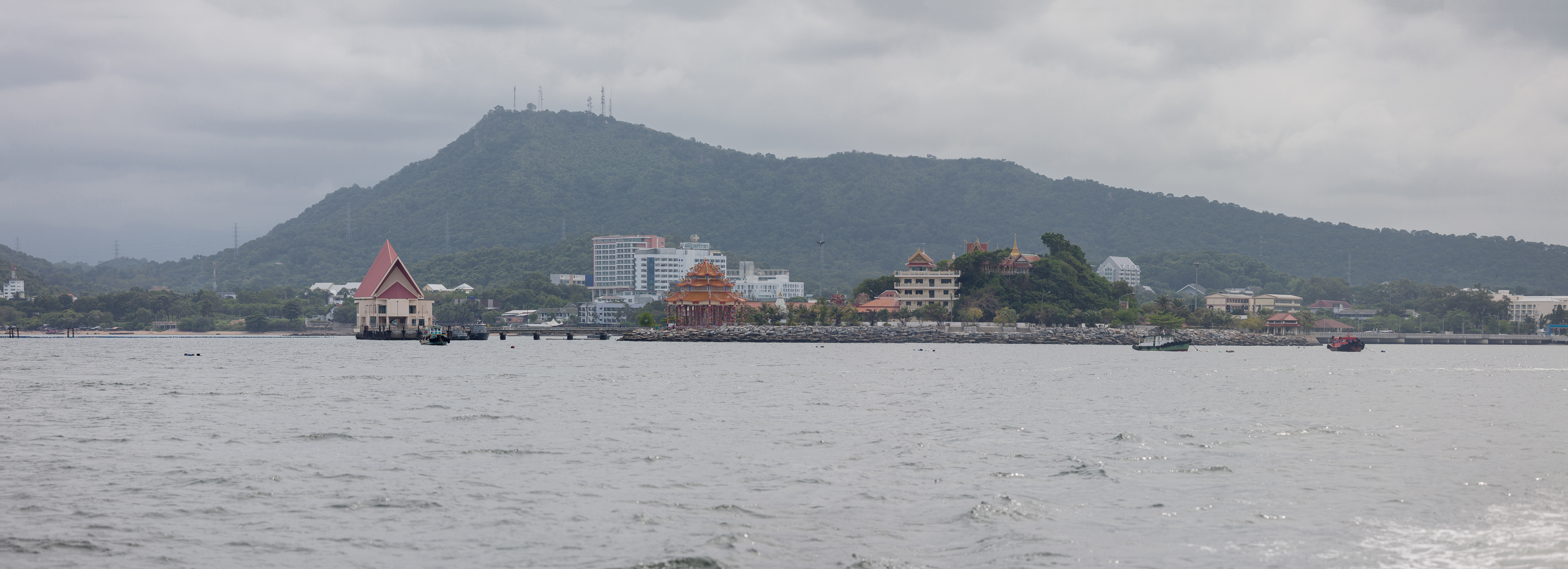
