= Mu Ko Kam =

- island
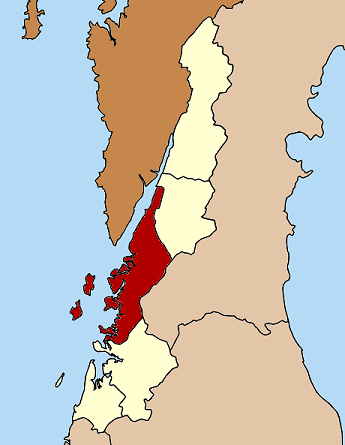
- Amphoe location in Ranong Province
- Coordinates: 9°58′2″N 98°38′2″E
- Country: Thailand
- Province: Ranong

Area
  - Total: 7.31 km^{2} (2.82 sq mi)

Population (2012)
  - Total: 0
  - Density: 0/km^{2} (0/sq mi)
- Time zone: UTC+7 (THA)
- Postal code: 85000
- Geocode: 8501

Mu Ko Kam (Thai: หมู่เกาะกำ) is a group of Islands in Ranong Province, Thailand.

== Details ==
They are mostly touristic islands and are pristine and quiet, relaxed, as opposed to Ko Samui or Ko Phangan. The capital of this group is the Ranger Station of Ko Kom Tok. There are about 10 islands with a size of 7.31 km^{2} and population of 0 all in Suk Samran District.
