= Mu Ko Phayam =

- island
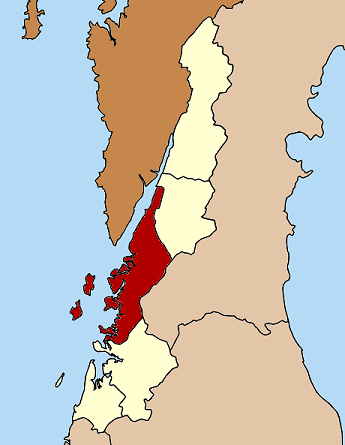
- Amphoe location in Ranong Province
- Coordinates: 9°52′N 98°28′E
- Country: Thailand
- Province: Ranong

Area
  - Total: 45.00 km^{2} (17.37 sq mi)

Population (2012)
  - Total: 1,172
  - Density: 0/km^{2} (0/sq mi)
- Time zone: UTC+7 (THA)
- Postal code: 85000
- Geocode: 8501

Mu Ko Phayam is a group of islands in Ranong Province, Thailand. They are mostly tourist islands and are pristine and quiet, relaxed, as opposed to Ko Samui or Ko Phangan. The capital of this group is the Megon village of Mea Mei. There are about 30 islands with a size of 45 km^{2} and population of 1172 divided between the 2 tambons of Ko Phayam and Bang Rin of Mueang Ranong District.

== List of islands ==
Nr	Island	Capital	Other Cities	Area (km^{2})	Population (Note: The islands' area and population data retrieved from the 2012 census)
1	Ko Chang (Ranong)	Ko Chang	ao lek, ao said, ao kai tao, ao tadaeng, ao yai, ao ko bay, Bangkalo	18.00	100
2	Ko Kham (Ranong)	Ko Kham resort		0.17	2
3	Ko Lao	Ko Lao		2.23	350
4	Ko Phayam	mea mai	laem hin, ao mook, ao kokiou, laem tab oaun, ao yai, laem rung, morgan, kao kwai, ao kwangpip, ao pai, ao hin khaow,	17.50	650
5	Ko Sin Hai	Ko Sin Hai		2.71	50
6	Ko tha Krut	Ko tha Krut		1.06	20
7	Other Islands	Ko Son	Ko Rai, Ko Talu, Ko Plai	3.40	0
	Mu Ko Phayam	mea mai	Ko Chang, Ko tao	45.00	1172
