= Ko Jum =

City in Nuea Khlong district, Thailand

Coordinates: 7°48′42.79″N 98°58′37.15″E

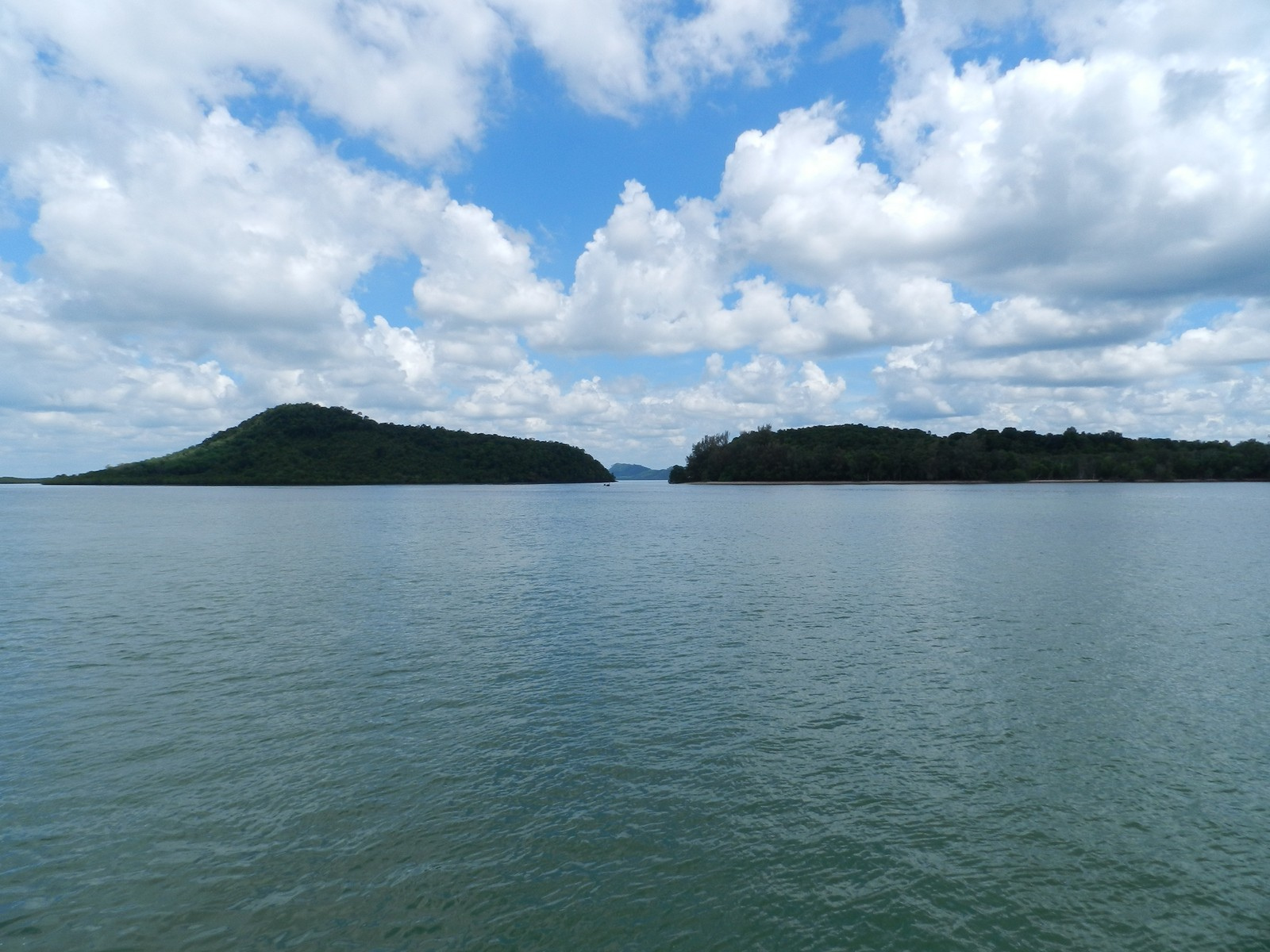
Ko Jum

Ko Jum (เกาะจำ, also Koh Jum) or Ko Pu (เกาะปู) is a part of Nuea Khlong district in Krabi province, Thailand. Ko Jum consists of three villages: Ban Ko Pu, Ban Ting Rai, and Ban Ko Jum. Ko Jum is approximately 25 kilometers (16 mi) south of Krabi town on the Andaman Sea.

== Geography ==
The island is home to several beaches including Sunset Beach, Coconut Beach, and Long Beach.

== Tourism ==
Accommodation on the island is mostly found in the central village of Ban Ting Rai.

== Transportation ==
The island of Ko Jum lies south of Krabi town and north of Ko Lanta. It is accessible by ferry.
