= Nuea Khlong district =

Nuea Khlong เหนือคลอง
- District
- District location in Krabi province
- Coordinates: 8°4′29″N 99°0′13″E
- Country: Thailand
- Province: Krabi
- Seat: Nuea Khlong

Area
  - Total: 414.8 km^{2} (160.2 sq mi)

Population (2548)
  - Total: 54,789
  - Density: 132.1/km^{2} (342/sq mi)
- Time zone: UTC+7 (ICT)
- Postal code: 81130
- Geocode: 8108

Nuea Khlong (Thai: เหนือคลอง, pronounced [nɯ̌a̯ kʰlɔ̄ːŋ]) is a district (amphoe) in Krabi province, Thailand.

== History ==
The minor district (king amphoe) was created on 1 April 1992 by splitting off eight tambons from Mueang Krabi district. It was upgraded to a full district on 5 December 1996.

== Geography ==
Neighboring districts are (from the northwest clockwise): Mueang Krabi, Khao Phanom, Khlong Thom, and Ko Lanta. To the west is the Andaman Sea.

== Administration ==
The district is divided into eight sub-districts (tambons), which are further subdivided into 56 villages (mubans). Nuea Khlong is a township (thesaban tambon) which covers parts of tambon Nuea Khlong. Each tambon has a tambon administrative organization (TAO).

No.	Name	Thai name	Villages	Pop.
1.	Nuea Khlong	เหนือคลอง	7	12,217
2.	Ko Siboya	เกาะศรีบอยา	7	4,643
3.	Khlong Khanan	คลองขนาน	9	7,999
4.	Khlong Khamao	คลองเขม้า	4	4,968
5.	Khok Yang	โคกยาง	7	5,835
6.	Taling Chan	ตลิ่งชัน	5	5,425
7.	Pakasai	ปกาสัย	9	7,192
8.	Huai Yung	ห้วยยูง	8	6,510

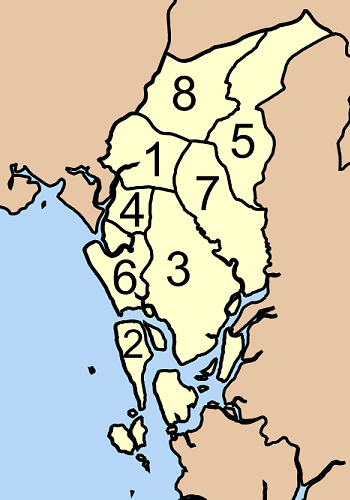

== Economy ==
Tambon Pakasai has long been the site of an electrical power generating plant run by the Electricity Generating Authority of Thailand (EGAT). In 1964, three 20 MW coal-fired plants came on-line adjacent to a coal mine that supplied fuel for the boilers. The plants were replaced in 1995 by a 340 MW generating plant burning natural gas and petroleum. EGAT plans to build on the same site an 800 MW coal-fired plant to come on-line in 2019, burning 2.3 million tonnes of coal yearly, imported from Indonesia, Australia, and South Africa. The development is estimated to cost 60 billion baht (US$2 billion). EGAT's plans have encountered significant resistance from local residents due to their health concerns and fears of detrimental environmental impact. EGAT counters by claiming that the plant will be a "clean coal" facility. Critics maintain that clean coal has never been successfully demonstrated at scale.
