= List of islands of Vietnam =

There are approximately 4000 islands in Vietnam. The Hoang Sa Archipelago has 130 large and small islands while the Truong Sa Archipelago has more than 100 small and large islands.

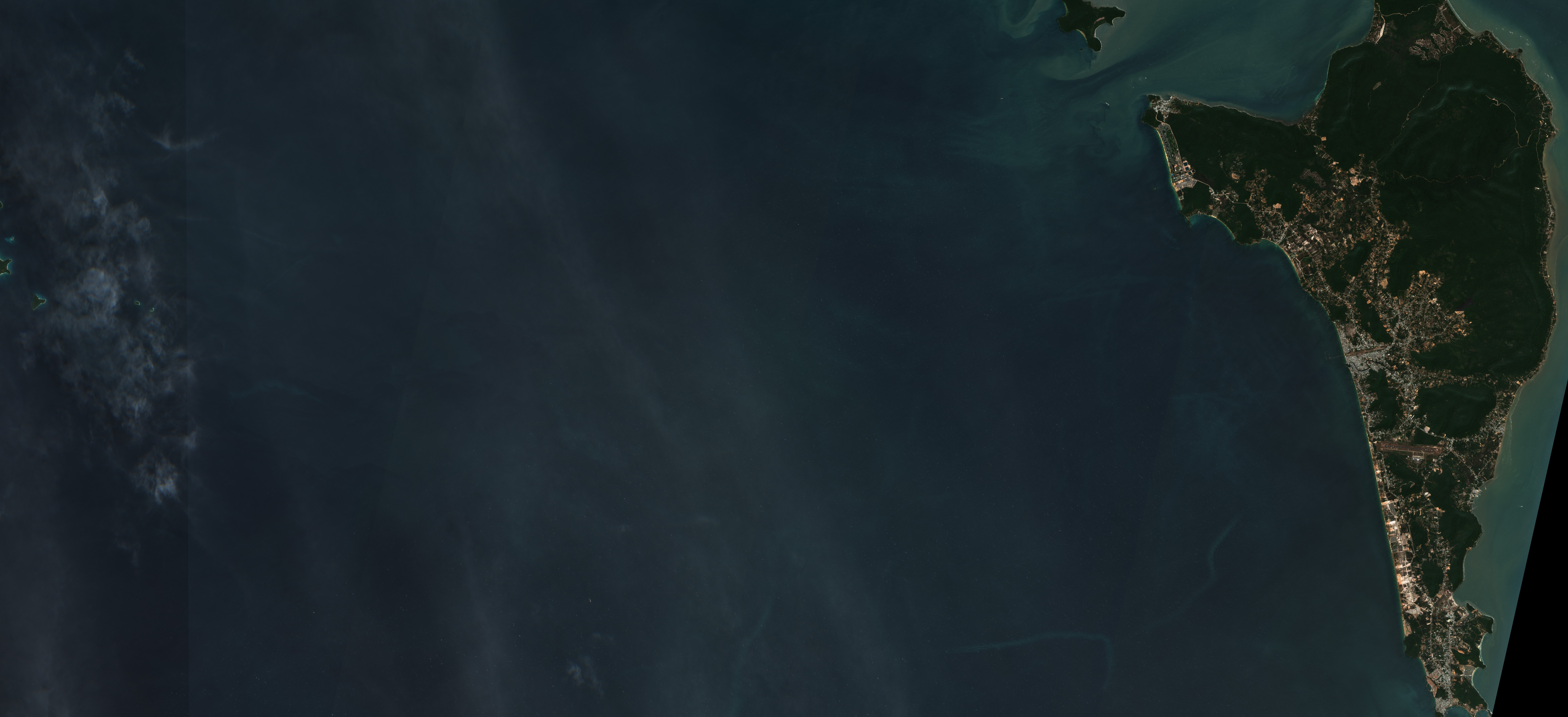
Phú Quốc Island, the biggest island in Vietnam

The following is a list of islands of Vietnam from the north to the south:

== Quảng Ninh province coast ==
- Trà Cổ island 21°29′23″N 108°4′24″E
- Co To Islands 20°59′00″N 107°46′00″E
- Hạ Long Bay's islets 20°54′N 107°12′E
- Tuần Châu 20.931076°N 106.986580°E

== Haiphong coast ==
- Cát Bà Island 20°48′00″N 106°59′59″E
- Bạch Long Vĩ island 20°08′N 107°43′E

== Quảng Trị province coast ==
- Cồn Cỏ

== Quảng Nam province coast ==
=== Chàm Islands ===
- Cù Lao Chàm
- Hòn Dài
- Hòn Khô Lớn
- Hòn Lá
- Hòn Mồ
- Hòn Tai

== Quảng Ngãi province coast ==
- Lý Sơn

== Bình Định province coast ==
- Cu lao Xanh

== Khánh Hoà province coast ==
- Bình Ba Island
- Hòn Lớn
- Hòn Tre (Khánh Hoà)

== Ninh Thuận province coast ==
- Hon Tai
- Hon Deo
- Hon Do (Red island)

== Bình Thuận province coast ==
- Phú Quý
- Hon Cau
- Hon Ghe
- Ke Ga island
- Hon Lao or Hon Ghenh
- Hon Ba (Bình Thuận)
- Hòn Cau

== Ho Chi Minh City coast ==
- Long Sơn
- Gò Găng
- Bãi Ngựa
- Cù lao Tào
- Vũng Tàu Island
- Hon Ba (Vũng Tàu)
- Côn Sơn Island (Côn Đảo)

=== Hon Trung islands ===
- Hon Trung Lon (Big Egg)
- Hon Trung Nho (Small Egg)

== Tiền Giang province coast ==
- Cồn Ngang
- Cù Lao Thới Sơn

== Trà Vinh province coast ==
- Cồn Nghêu

== Cà Mau province coast ==
- Hon Da Bac
- Hon Chuoi (Banana island)
- Hon Khoai islands (Yam island)
  - Hon Khoai island
  - Hon Sao
  - Hon Doi Moi (Cà Mau province)
  - Hon Da Le
  - Hon Tuong

== Kiên Giang province coast ==
- Phú Quốc
  - Thổ Chu Islands
  - Hon Mot
  - An Thới Islands
- Hon Ban or Hon Bang
- Hon Thay Boi
- Hon Doi Moi (Kiên Giang province)
- Hon Nghe
- Hon Tre (Bamboo island)
- Hon Rai hay Hon Son
- Hà Tiên Islands
- Bà Lụa Islands
- Nam Du Islands

== Sóc Trăng province coast ==
- Cù Lao Dung
- Cồn Mỹ Phước
- Cù Lao Nai

== Territorial disputes in the South China Sea ==
- Hoàng Sa (Paracel Islands) 16°32′05″N 111°36′30″E
- Trường Sa (Spratly Islands)8°38′30″N 111°55′55″E

== See also ==
- List of islands
- Geography of Vietnam
