= Thổ Châu =

Thổ Châu may refer to:

- Thổ Châu islands: an archipelago and special zone in the South West of Vietnam
- Thổ Châu Island: the largest island of Thổ Châu islands
