= Thổ Châu Island =

Island in Vietnam

Native name: Đảo Thổ Chu
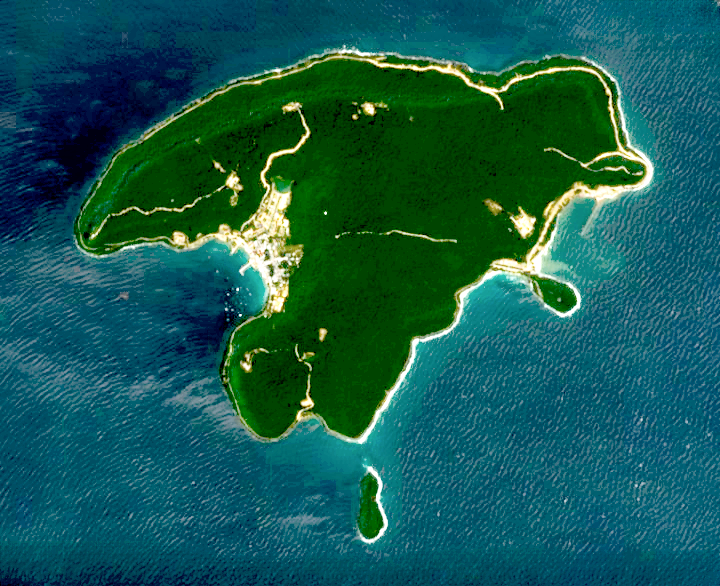
- Satellite image of the island

- Location within Vietnam

Geography
- Location: Gulf of Thailand
- Coordinates: 9°18′N 103°29′E
- Archipelago: Thổ Châu
- Area: 13.95 km^{2} (5.39 sq mi)
- Highest point: 167 m (548 ft)

Administration
- Vietnam
- Province: An Giang
- Special zone: Thổ Châu special zone

Thổ Châu Island (Vietnamese: Đảo Thổ Châu) is the largest island of Thổ Châu islands in the Gulf of Thailand. It constitutes Thổ Châu special zone (Vietnamese: Đặc khu Thổ Châu) of An Giang province in the Mekong Delta region of Vietnam.

== History ==
The island contains the administrative center of Thổ Châu special zone as Thổ Châu township (thị trấn Thổ Châu), Kiên Giang Province, Vietnam. In the West, the island is also known as Pulau Panjang or Pulo Panjang. (Note: The Project Gutenberg EBook of Embassy to the Eastern Courts of Cochin-China, Siam, and Muscat, by Edmund Roberts. Page 228.) (Note: Please see An Nam đại quốc họa đồ, southmost of Việt Nam.) (Note: Westerners call it by Malay Pulau Panjang. Pulau: island; Panjang: long.)

During the Republic of Vietnam regime, Thổ Châu Island was under the administration of An Xuyên Province.

On May 10, 1975, the Khmer Rouge occupied the island and, as reported by the Government of Vietnam, "destroyed villages, killed many people, and abducted 515 inhabitants of the island". From May 24 to May 27, 1975, Vietnamese militia forces attacked the occupiers and recaptured the island. In 1977, the Khmer Rouge raided Thổ Châu Island once again but were defeated.

On April 27, 1992, under the arrangement of the People's Committee of Kiên Giang Province, six families with about thirty people moved to Thổ Châu Island and settled there. On April 24, 1993, the Vietnamese government decided to establish Thổ Châu Commune which has been in charge of administrating the whole archipelago.

On March 8, 2014, Malaysia Airlines Flight 370 lost contact with ground while flying by Thổ Châu island.

== Geography ==
=== Topography ===
Thổ Châu Island is located to the southwest of Phú Quốc Island and Rạch Giá and to the northwest of Cape Cà Mau, specifically 55 nautical miles (102 km; 63 mi), 220 kilometres (140 mi) and 85 nautical miles (157 km; 98 mi) away. There are four beaches on the island (Bai Ngu, Bai Dong, Bai Mun and Bai Nhat) of which the largest are Bai Ngu (literally "Royal Beach") and Bai Dong.

=== Environment ===
Thổ Châu Island has a diverse natural environment with high-density coral reefs, white sand beaches and pristine forests. A majority of 99 species of coral present here belong to the two genera Montipora and Acropora of Acroporidae. The flora consists of about two hundreds of species, mostly Clusiaceae, Fabaceae và Sapotaceae. The island is also home to endemic gecko species Cyrtodactylus thochuensis. However, Thổ Châu is being threatened by environmental pollution since domestic waste is dumped into the sea.

=== Demography ===
The majority of inhabitants are navy personnel and border guards who chose to settle on the island. As of early 2023, there are 549 households with about 1,900 people who mainly reside at Bai Ngu and Bai Dong. The residents' lives are not easy as they have to move around the island twice a year to avoid storms. In the southwest monsoon from April to August, people move from Bai Ngu to Bai Dong and in the northeast monsoon from September to March, they reverse their migration.

== Culture ==
Thổ Châu Island has only one electric generator for Bãi Ngự. The island does not have a water supply network so military personnel and civilians have to dig wells to get water. Mobile information services of Viettel, MobiFone and Vinaphone have reached the island. Thổ Châu Island Lighthouse was set up on January 25, 2000. Its range is 29 nmi (54 km; 33 mi) during daytime and 12 nmi (22 km; 14 mi) in the nighttime.

In addition, the island has a primary-high school (trường liên cấp Thổ Châu), a post office and a temple commemorating the victims of the Khmer Rouge.

== Economy ==
In general, the economy of Thổ Châu Island is still difficult. Local residents live mainly by fishing, including seafood trading and fisheries logistics. The efficiency in the exploitation of marine resources is only at low level.

According to Decision No. 18/2009/QĐ-TTg by Prime Minister Nguyễn Tấn Dũng, Thổ Châu Island is planned to become a large fisheries service center of the region.

== See also ==
- Côn Đảo
- Hòn Thơm
- Nam Du
