= Gulf of Thailand =

Shallow inlet in the South China Sea

- อ่าวไทย; ឈូងសមុទ្រសៀម; Vịnh Thái Lan
- Location of the Gulf of Thailand
- Interactive map of Gulf of Thailand
- Location: Southeast Asia
- Coordinates: 09°30′N 102°00′E
- Type: Gulf
- Primary inflows: South China Sea, Chao Phraya River, Mae Klong, Bang Pakong River, Tha Chin River, Tapi River
- Basin countries: Thailand; Cambodia; Vietnam; Malaysia
- Max. length: 800 km (500 mi)
- Max. width: 560 km (350 mi)
- Surface area: 320,000 km^{2} (120,000 sq mi)
- Average depth: 58 m (190 ft)
- Max. depth: 85 m (279 ft)

The Gulf of Thailand, historically known as the Gulf of Siam, is a shallow inlet adjacent to the southwestern South China Sea, bounded between the southwestern shores of Mainland Southeast Asia and the northern half of the Malay Peninsula. It is around 800 km (500 mi) in length and up to 560 km (350 mi) in width, and has a surface area of 320,000 km^{2} (120,000 sq mi). The gulf is surrounded on the north, west and southwest by the coastline of Thailand; on the northeast by Cambodia; and the Mekong Delta region of Vietnam. It opens to the South China Sea in the southeast.

== Names ==
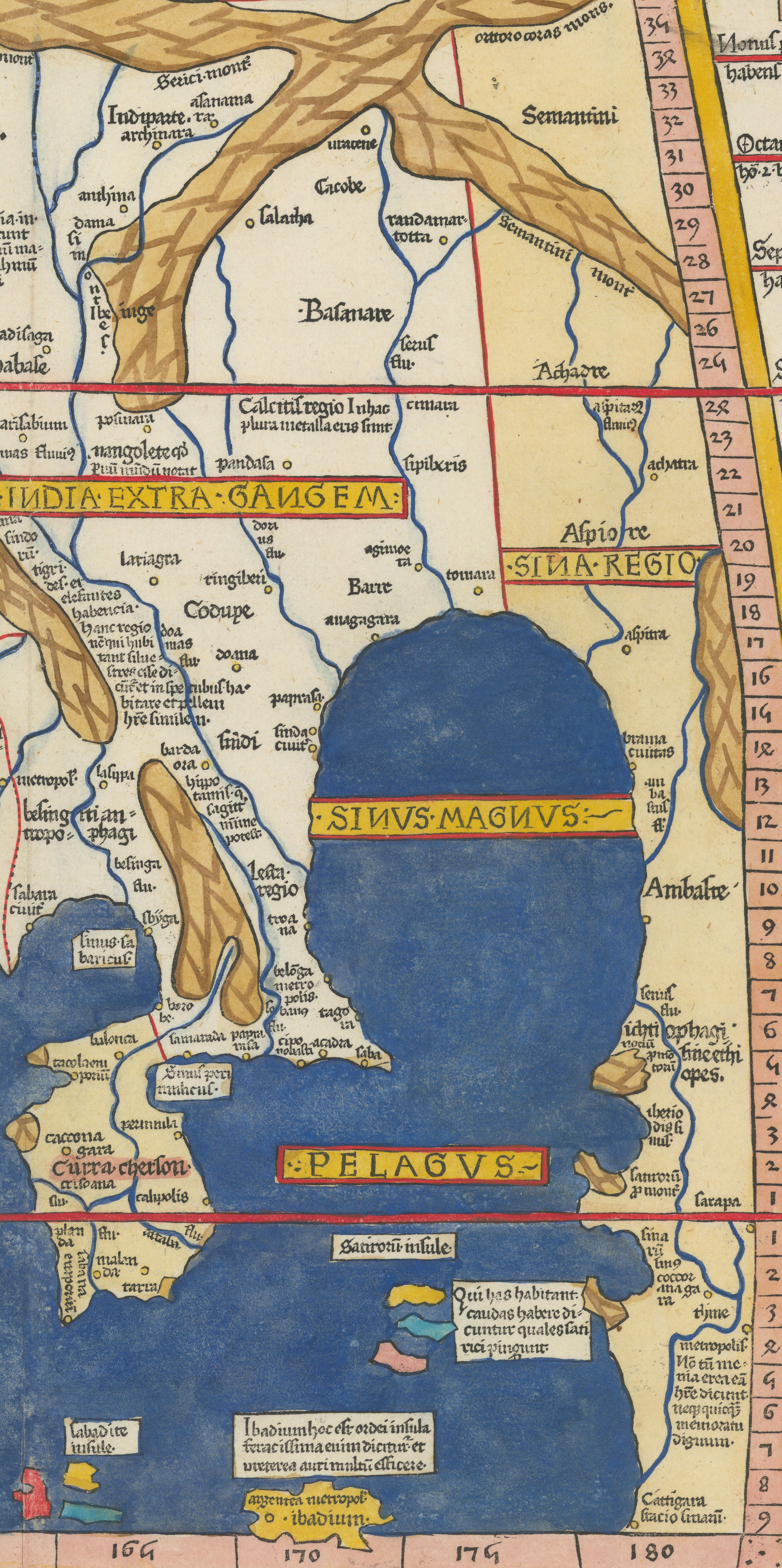
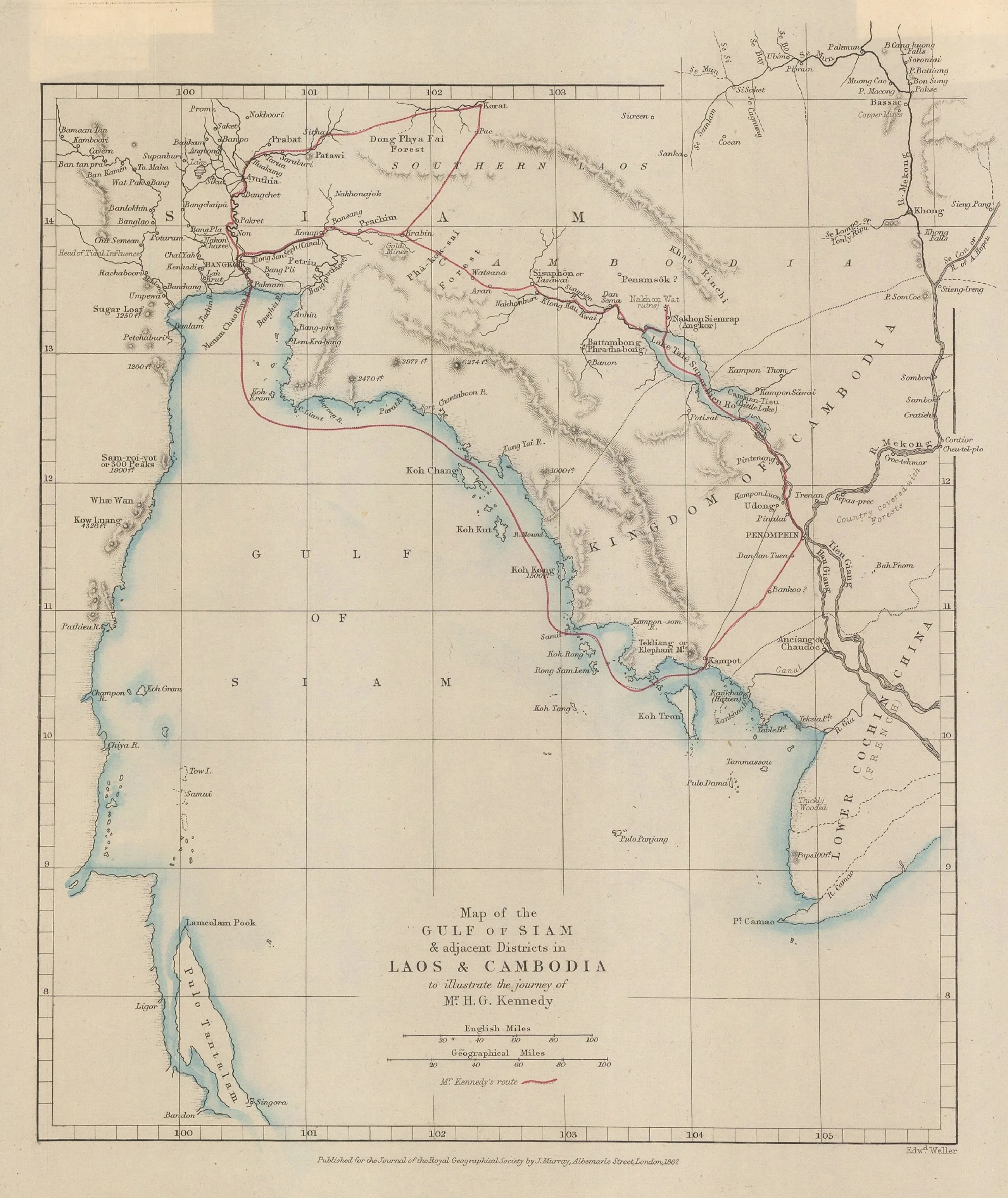
Clockwise from top left: 1. Sinus Magnus 1486 map detail. 2. Gulf of Siam map in 1867.

The name Gulf of Thailand (Thai: อ่าวไทย; RTGS: Ao Thai; [ʔàːw tʰāj]) has been adopted as the official name of the body by the International Hydrographic Organization. The gulf was originally called the Gulf of Siam (Thai: อ่าวสยาม; RTGS: Ao Sayam), when the country was officially named Siam; it was called Teluk Siam (تلوق سيم) in the Malay language, and Chūng sa'mot Siem (ឈូងសមុទ្រសៀម, IPA: [cʰuːŋ saʔmót siəm]) in Khmer. In Vietnamese it is named Vịnh Thái Lan.

It is generally identified with the Great Gulf (Latin: Magnus Sinus) known to Greek, Roman, Arab, Persian, and Renaissance cartographers before the influx of Portuguese explorers removed the phantom Dragon Tail peninsula from European world maps in the 16th century. The 1486 Ulm edition of the map Undecima Asie Tabula by Ptolemy's Geographia (printed by Johann Reger), the gulf has the Latin name Sinus Magnus (English: Great Gulf).

=== Etymology ===
The Gulf of Thailand, historically known as the Gulf of Siam, derives its name from the historical kingdom of Siam, the former name of modern-day Thailand. The term Gulf of Siam was widely used in Western cartography and geographical references for centuries until the country renamed itself to Thailand in 1939. This reflects the colonial-era practice of naming regions based on the prevalent local political entities at the time.

Siam itself is an exonym, believed to have origins in the Sanskrit word śyāma (श्याम), which means 'dark' or 'brown', referring to the skin tone of the region's inhabitants. The term Siam was used internationally until 1939, when the country officially changed its name to Thailand. Following this renaming, Gulf of Thailand gradually became the more commonly used term, especially in official contexts, although Gulf of Siam is still occasionally used.

== Geography ==
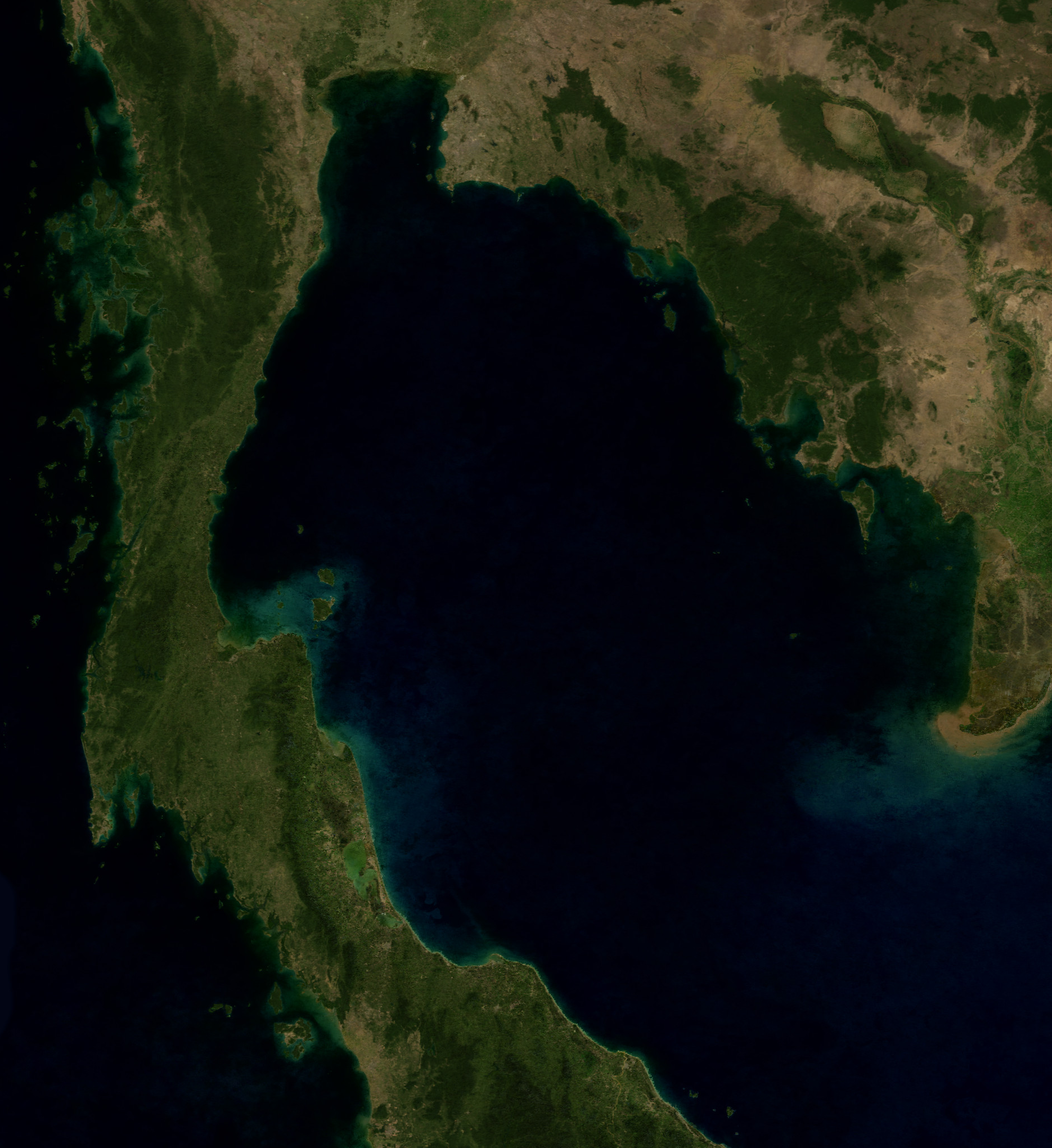
Satellite photo of the Gulf of Thailand in January 2004 by NASA

Gulf location in the region

The Gulf of Thailand is bordered by Thailand, Cambodia, Malaysia, and Vietnam. It occupies a seabed area of 304,000 km^{2} from 6° N to 13°30' N latitude and 99°E to 104° E longitude. The gulf is defined by Thailand since around 70% of the coastline is Thai. The northern tip of the gulf is the Bay of Bangkok at the mouth of the Chao Phraya River. The southern boundary of the gulf is defined by a line from Cape Bai Bung in southern Vietnam (just south of the mouth of the Mekong River) to the town of Tumpat and Pengkalan Chepa on the Malaysian coast. This is the largest gulf in Southeast Asia.

The gulf is relatively shallow: its mean depth is 58 metres (190 ft) and the maximum depth is only 85 metres (279 ft). This makes water exchange slow, and the strong water inflow from the rivers reduces the level of salinity in the gulf (3.05–3.25 percent) and enriches the sediments. Only at greater depths does water with a higher salinity (3.4 percent) flow into the gulf from the South China Sea. It fills the central depression below a depth of 50 metres (160 ft). The main rivers which empty into the gulf are the Chao Phraya, including its distributary Tha Chin River, the Mae Klong, and Bang Pakong rivers at the Bay of Bangkok, and to a lesser degree the Tapi River flowing into Bandon Bay in the southwest of the gulf. Other notable tributaries of the gulf are the Pattani River, Phetchaburi River, and the Pran Buri River.

=== Delimitation ===
The International Hydrographic Organization (IHO), the highest international authority on the delimitation of seas, considers the Gulf of Thailand to be a sea. In its world-renowned publication, "Limits of Oceans and Seas" (3rd edition, 1953), the IHO assigns it the identification number 47 and defines it as follows:

"47.—Gulf of Thailand .
On the south. A line running from the Western extreme of Cambodia or Camau Point (8°36'N) to the Northern extreme of the point on the East side of the estuary of the Kelantan River (6°14′N 102°15′E)".

Cape Cà Mau is in Vietnam, the Kelantan River is in Malaysia.

=== Seabed morphology ===
The seabed morphology in the central depression of the gulf is characterised by the presence of elongated mounds and ridges arranged parallel to the axis of the basin. This morphology, widespread within the gulf in water depths exceeding 50 m, covers an area of tens of thousands of square kilometres.

It reflects an interaction between sediment dewatering and the erosional activity of the present-day bottom currents. The sediment dewatering and fluid seepage result in the formation of numerous small pits and pockmarks. The long-term erosion imposed by currents of stable orientation modifies pockmarks into long runnels and depressions, and ultimately leads to the formation of the large fields of elongated mounds and ridges, as well as the residual outliers of un-eroded mud and clay sheets.

=== Coastline ===
Around 70% of the gulf's coastline is Thai, 16.5% is Cambodian, 13% is Vietnamese, and 0.67% is Malaysian.

Country	Coastline length	Provinces	Notes
Thailand	1,878 km (1,167 mi)	Chonburi, Rayong, Chanthaburi, Trat, Samut Prakan, Bangkok, Samut Sakhon, Samut Songkhram, Phetchaburi, Prachuap Khiri Khan, Chumphon, Surat Thani, Nakhon Si Thammarat, Songkhla, Pattani, and Narathiwat.	
Cambodia	443 km (275 mi)	Kep, Kampot, Koh Kong, Preah Sihanouk.	
Vietnam	200 km (120 mi) and 154 km (96 mi)	An Giang and Cà Mau (until Cape Cà Mau).	
Malaysia	18 km (11 mi)	Kelantan (from the border with Thailand to the Kelantan River).	
Total	2,693 km (1,673 mi)		

=== Bays ===
There are a couple of bays along the gulf's coasts of Thailand, Cambodia and Vietnam.

Bay name	Native name	Surface area	Country	Description
Bay of Bangkok	อ่าวกรุงเทพ	8,640 km^{2} (3,340 mi^{2})	Thailand	
Prachuap Bay	อ่าวประจวบ		Thailand	
Ao Manao	อ่าวมะนาว		Thailand	
Sattahip Bay	อ่าวสัตหีบ		Thailand	
Bandon Bay	อ่าวบ้านดอน		Thailand	
Bay of Kampong Som	ឆ្នេរកំពង់សោម		Cambodia	
Veal Rinh Bay	ឆកវាលរិញ		Cambodia	
Chhak Kep Bay	ឆកកែប		Cambodia	
Chhak Kaoh Kong	ឆកកោះកុង		Cambodia	
Vinh Thuan Yen	Vịnh Thuận Yến		Vietnam	
Vinh Ba Hon	Vịnh Ba Hòn		Vietnam	
Vinh Hon Chong	Vịnh Hòn Chông		Vietnam	

=== Islands ===
The larger islands in the gulf include:

- Ko Chang
- Ko Mak
- Ko Kut
- Ko Samui
- Ko Pha Ngan
- Ko Tao
- Ko Phaluai
- Ko Sichang
- Ko Lan
- Ko Phai
- Ko Khram
- Ko Samae San
- Ko Samet
- Ko Rang
- Ko Khangkhao
- Ko Man Nok
- Ko Wai
- Ko Phi
- Ko Kham
- Ko Sai
- Ko Kra
- Ko Losin
- Phú Quốc
- Thổ Chu Islands
- Hà Tiên Islands
- Bà Lụa Islands
- Nam Du Islands
- Koh Kong
- Koh Rong
- Koh Rong Sanloem
- Koh Sdach
- Koh Puos
- Koh Dek Koul
- Koh Russei
- Koh Ta Kiev
- Koh Preab
- Koh Thmei
- Koh Seh
- Koh Ach Seh
- Koh Tonsay
- Koh Tang
- Koh Pring
- Koh Poulo Wai

== History ==
=== Paleolake in Sundaland ===
The map shows the probable extent of land and water at the time of the Last Glacial Maximum, 20,000 years ago and when the sea level was likely more than 110 meters lower

During the Last Glacial Maximum (26,000-20,000 years ago) the 3-4 km thick ice sheets in the Northern hemisphere lowered the global sea level by about 120 meters. The climate was -6 Celsius colder in Thailand. The sea level was 125 meters lower so there was no seawater in the Gulf of Thailand which has a max depth of 85 meters. Sundaland was a subcontinent that connected the Mainland with the former islands of Western Indonesia in Maritime Southeast Asia. The Gulf of Thailand was a large paleolake with a major paleo-river system in Sundaland. The principal water source regions were the Eastern Malay Peninsula and the Chao Phraya Basin. It had a watershed of circa 1,020,000 km^{2} (390,000 mi^{2}). It was filled with fresh water from the rivers and rain. The Chao Phraya was the biggest tributary that supplied the paleolake with water. The modern river systems connected to the paleo-river system of the Gulf of Thailand are: Johor, Rompin, Endau, Kuantan, Kelantan, Tapi, Mae Klong, Chao Phraya, Bang Pakong. There was another major paleo-river that carried the water from the southeastern shore of the paleolake into the South China Sea. Sundaland existed until circa 15000 years ago. It disappeared when the sea levels began to rise.

== Environment ==
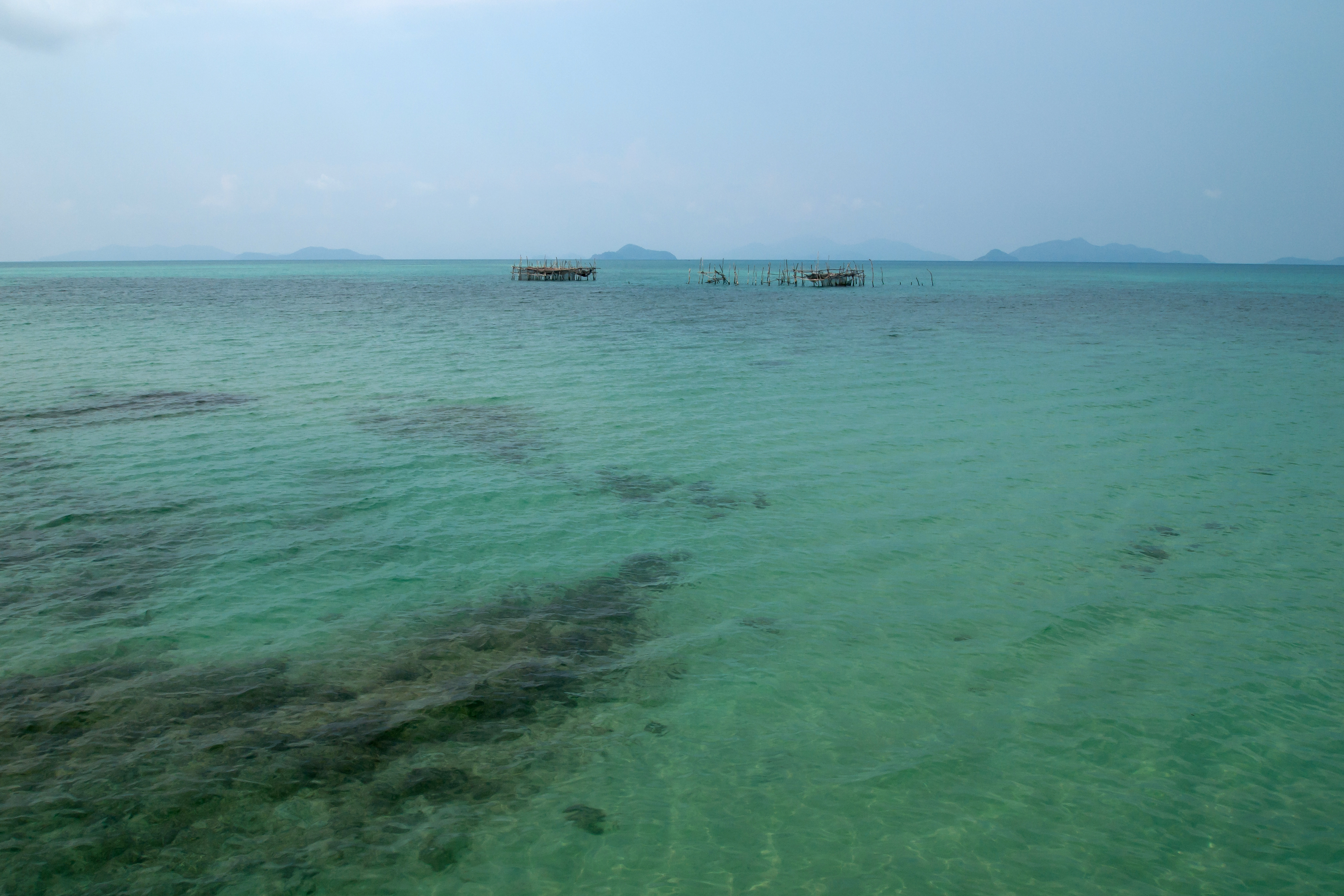
Shallow waters of the Gulf of Thailand off the coast of Ko Mak

=== Coral reefs ===
There are 75,590 rai of coral reef in the gulf, of which five percent are considered to be in fertile condition. In 2010 severe coral bleaching occurred at most reef sites in the country. Bleaching of reefs in the Andaman Sea was more severe and extensive than that in the Gulf of Thailand. In 2016, coral bleaching was detected at Ko Thalu and Ko Lueam in Prachuap Khiri Khan Province for the first time. Scientists have determined that bleaching starts when seawater temperature rises beyond 30 °C for more than three weeks. Given the prolonged period of temperatures up to 32 °C at Ko Thalu in Prachuap Khiri Khan, five to ten percent of corals in the area are already bleached.

=== Water quality ===
Coastal water monitoring results in 2015 from 202 sampling locations, collected twice annually, indicate that no Thai coastal waters were found to be in excellent condition. Sixteen percent of coastal water was of good quality, 72 percent was of fair quality, 9 percent was of poor quality and 3 percent was of very poor quality. The quality of all coastal waters exhibited similar percentages — most were of fair quality — except for the Inner Gulf of Thailand, where the coastal water was poor to very poor. In comparison to coastal water quality as measured in 2014, water quality has deteriorated. Some gulf waters off Chachoengsao Province, Samut Sakhon Province, Samut Prakan Province, Bangkok, Rayong Province, Chonburi Province, Phetchaburi Province, Prachuap Khiri Khan Province, and Surat Thani Province were judged to have coastal waters in "poor" or "very poor" condition. Songkhla was the only province on the gulf with coastal water rated "good" quality.

=== Fisheries ===
Of Thailand's total marine catch, 41 percent is caught in the Gulf of Thailand and 19 percent in the Andaman Sea. Forty percent is caught in waters outside Thailand's EEZ.

=== Coastal erosion ===
Thailand has 1,660 kilometres of coastline bordering the gulf. "Severe erosion", more than five metres of coastline loss per year, afflicts 670 kilometres of that total. At least some of the erosion is attributable to the clearing of mangrove forests to make way for shrimp farms.

=== Plastic pollution ===
In February 2017, a 10 kilometer-long patch of plastic refuse was found floating off Chumphon Province. Thailand is among the world's worst plastic polluters. More than half of "land-based plastic waste leakage" into the sea originates from just five countries: China, Indonesia, the Philippines, Thailand, and Vietnam.

The Thai Marine and Coastal Resources Department has noted that at least 300 sea animals on average—60 per cent of which are whales and dolphins—die from eating plastic fishing gear and trash each year. Filter feeding invertebrates tested off the coast of Chonburi Province showed high levels of microplastics, leading the authors to warn that, "Health risks are possible when people consume these contaminated marine organisms, particularly shellfish."

Thailand's Pollution Control Department (PCD) estimates that plastic waste in the country is increasing at an annual rate of 12 percent, or around two million tonnes per year.

=== Oil spills ===
In 2013, a pipeline leak resulted in an oil slick that went on to coat a beach on the nearby Ka Samet island.

In late January 2022, a leak in the pipeline operated by the Star Petroleum Refining Public Company Ltd caused a spill of 20 to 50 tonnes across 47 km^{2} of water, with some oil reaching the coast of Rayong province 20 km away.

== Tourism ==
The Gulf of Thailand's many coral reefs have made it attractive to divers. The tropical warmth of the water attracts many tourists. Some of the most important tourist destinations in the gulf are the islands of Ko Samui and Ko Pha Ngan in Surat Thani Province, Pattaya in Chonburi Province, Cha-am in Phetchaburi Province, Hua Hin in Prachuap Khiri Khan Province, and Ko Samet in Rayong Province. Technical diving is particularly popular around Ko Samae San due to it having the deepest dive sites in the Gulf of Thailand. The deepest technical dive site in the gulf is the Samaesan Hole. In media, the Samaesan Hole is commonly reported as a dangerous dive site due to a number of hazards including unexploded ordinance, strong unpredictable currents and its location in a commercial shipping lane. Red Bull recognised it as one of the most extreme dive sites in the world which has attracted experienced divers to the area.

In recent years, the bay has become known for its whale watching activities, targeting the endemic, critically endangered populations of cetaceans (Eden's whales, newly described Omura's whales, Chinese white dolphins, and Irrawaddy dolphins showing unique feeding behaviors), and dugongs. It was first classified by Müller in 1776 as Trichechus dugon. Five species of the sea turtles have been found in the Gulf of Thailand and on Andaman Sea coastlines: olive ridley turtles, green turtles, hawksbill turtles, loggerhead turtles, and leatherback turtles.

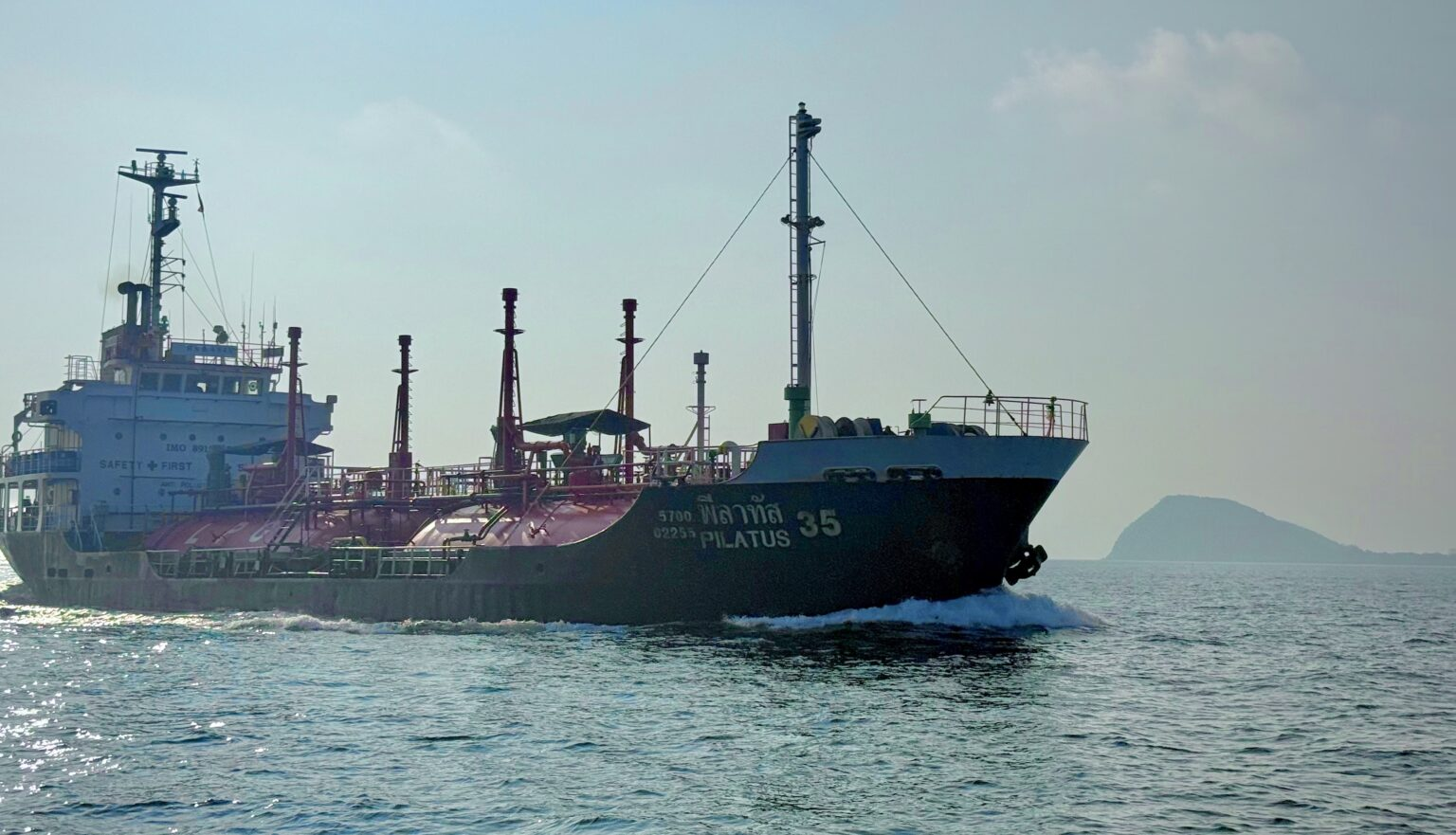
Commercial ship passing over the Samaesan Hole dive site

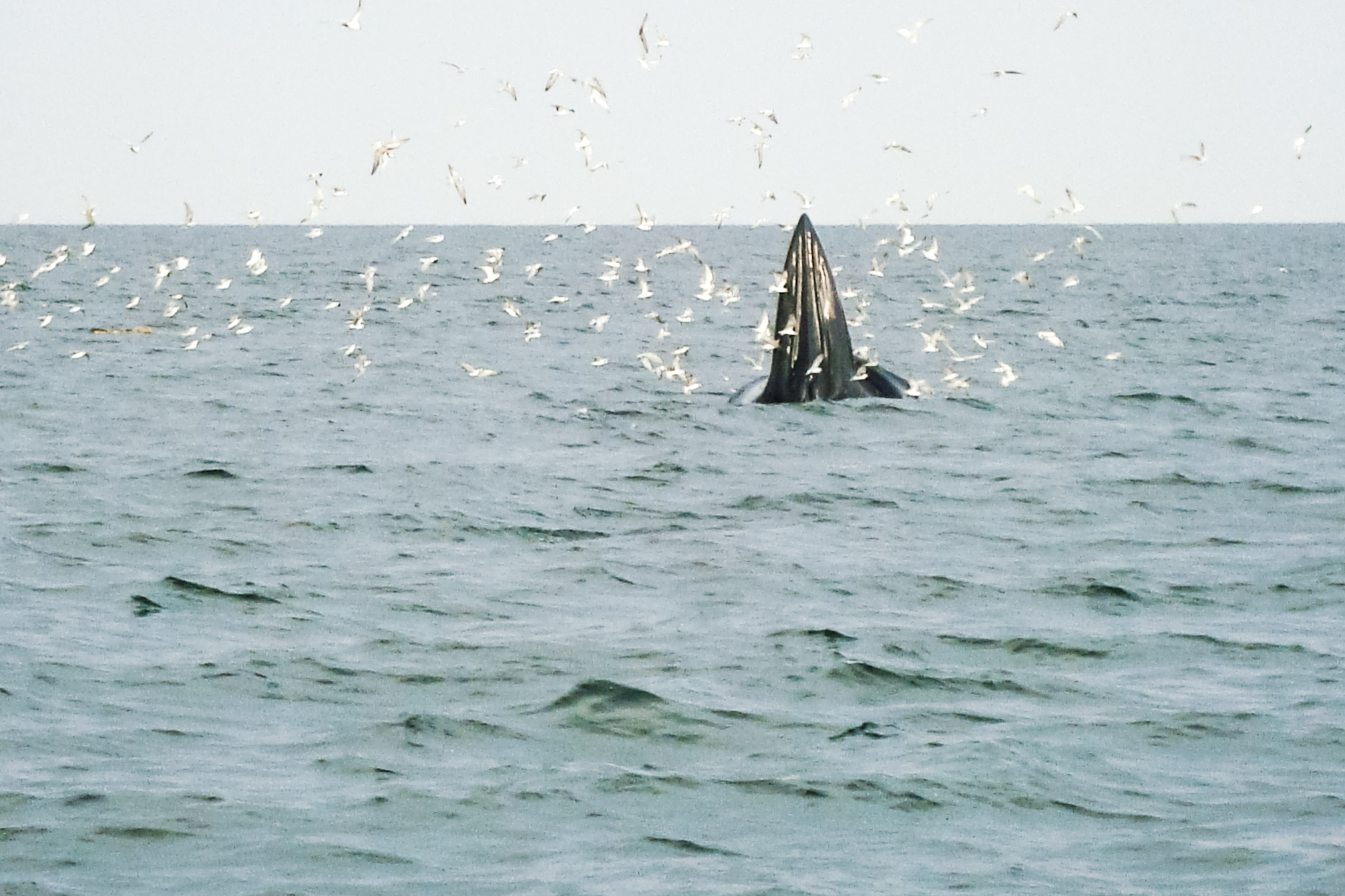
Eden's whale feeds in the gulf

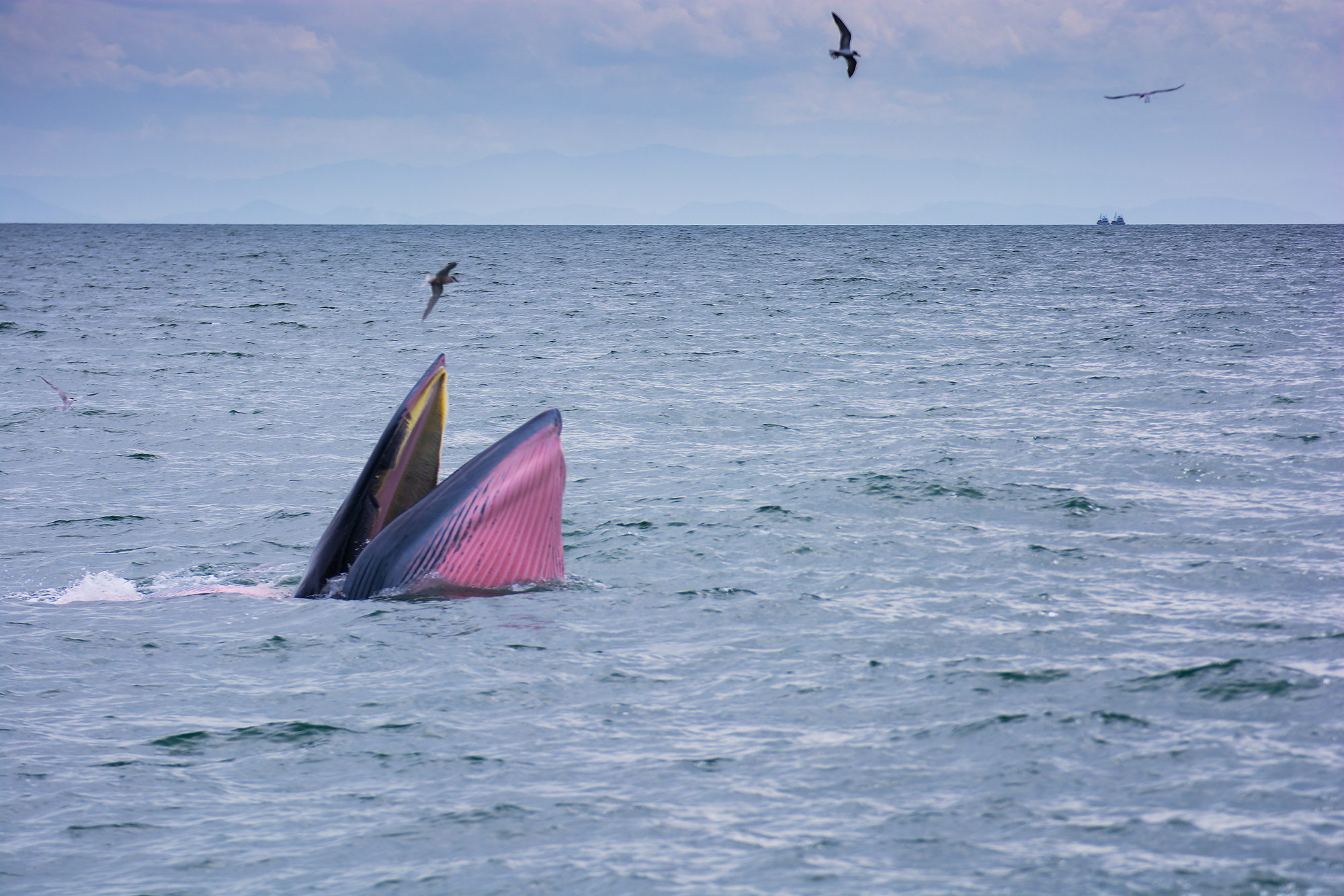
Eden's whale off Bang Tapun

== Territorial disputes ==
The area between Malaysia, Thailand, Cambodia, and Vietnam is subject to several territorial disputes. Malaysia and Thailand have chosen to jointly develop the disputed areas, which include the islands of Ko Kra and Ko Losin. A long-standing dispute between Cambodia and Vietnam in the Gulf of Thailand concerns mainly the island of Phú Quốc or Koh Tral in Khmer, which is off the Cambodian coast. Cambodia also claims 48,000 square kilometres (19,000 mi^{2}) of shelf area.

== See also ==
- 2010 floods in Thailand and north Malaysia
- Apsara field
- Malaysia Airlines flight 370
