= Bà Lụa Islands =

Native name: Quần đảo Bà Lụa
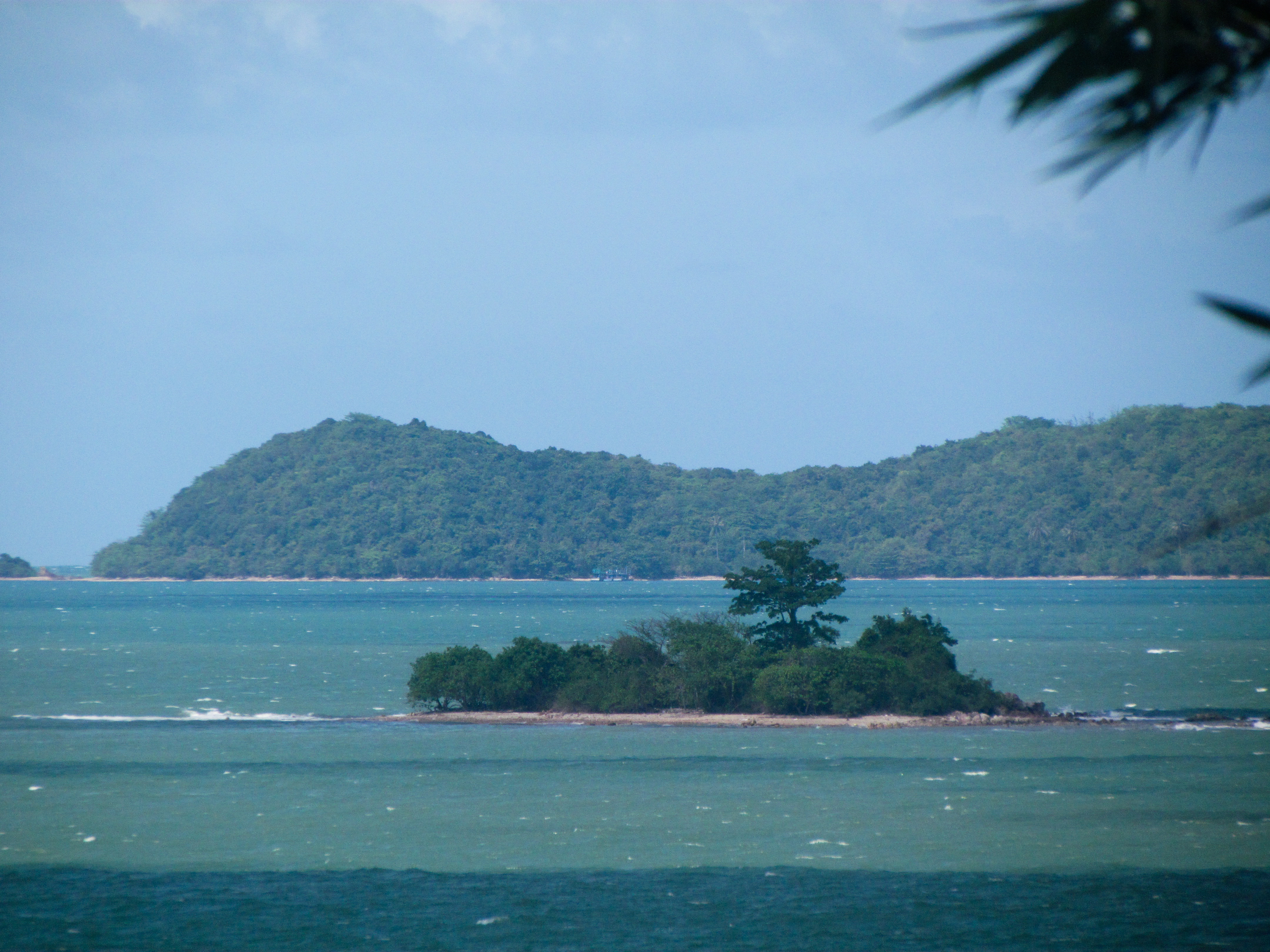
- An islet of Bà Lụa Islands

- Location within Vietnam
- Interactive map of Bà Lụa Islands

Geography
- Location: Gulf of Thailand
- Coordinates: 10°09′N 104°32′E
- Total islands: 34 or 42
- Major islands: Hòn Heo
- Highest point: 124 meters (407 feet) on Re Lớn or 113 meters (371 feet) on Hòn Heo

Administration
- Vietnam
- Province: An Giang
- Commune: Sơn Hải

Bà Lụa Islands (Vietnamese: Quần đảo Bà Lụa) is an archipelago located in the Gulf of Thailand. It constitutes Sơn Hải Commune of An Giang province, Vietnam. The archipelago is known as "(Small) Ha Long of the South".

== Etymology ==
There are several different interpretations to the name of the islands. Some sources explain that Bà Lụa was the Chinese Vietnamese wife of an influential Frenchman who had arrived here to develop the area; since all of related legal papers were in her name, the islands was named Bà Lụa. Author Anh Dong claims that Bà Lụa ("Lady Silk") is the name of a female general in charge of military logistics who established a silk mill on the islands in order to supply Nguyễn Trung Trực's militia force. Another source says that around 1858, a feudal mandarin married a beautiful and gentle wife who wanted to stay away from the officialdom and eventually settled on the islands. Every day she raised silkworms and wove silk, so the islands have been called Bà Lụa ever since.

== Geography ==
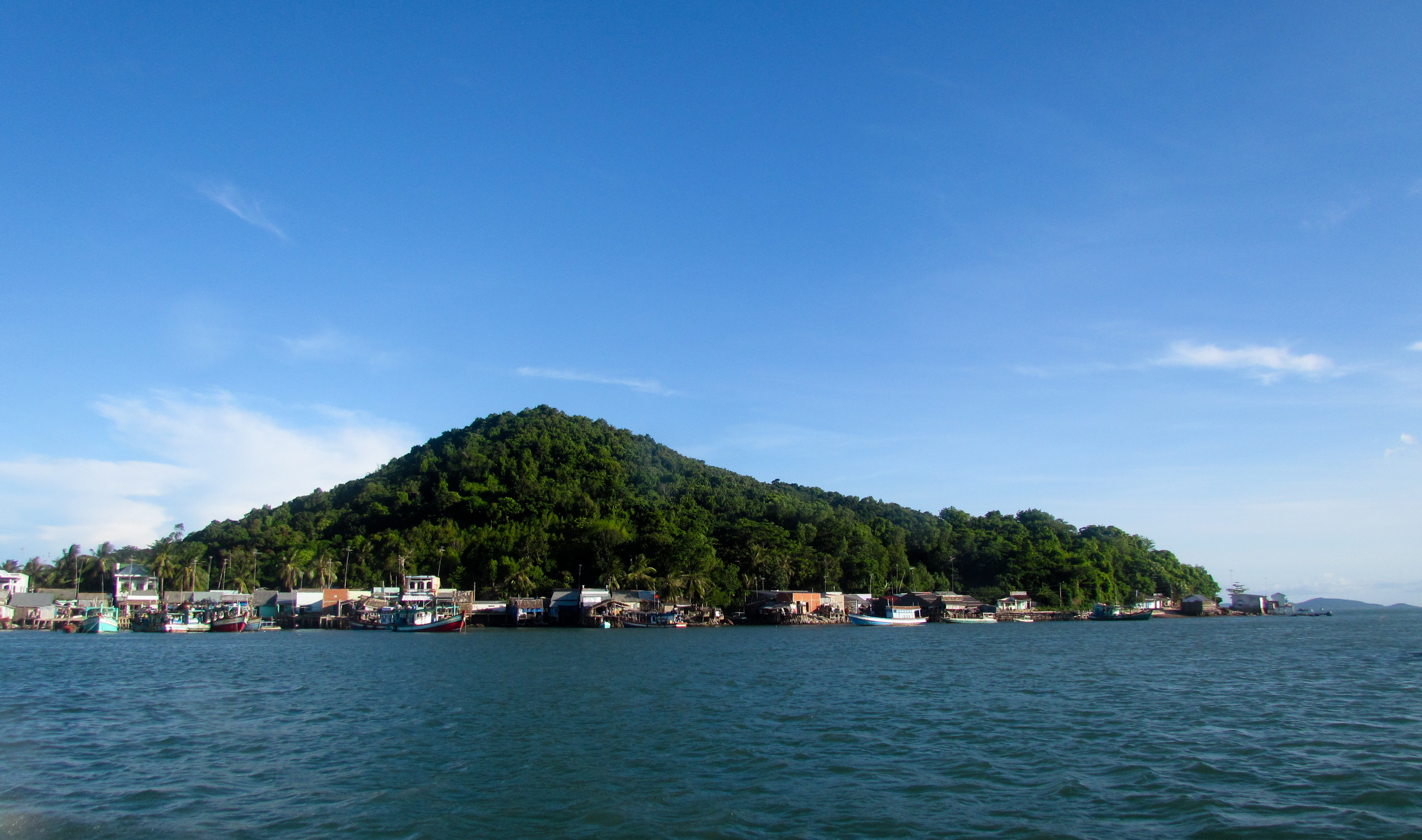
View of Hòn Heo ("Pig Island"), the largest island in the group

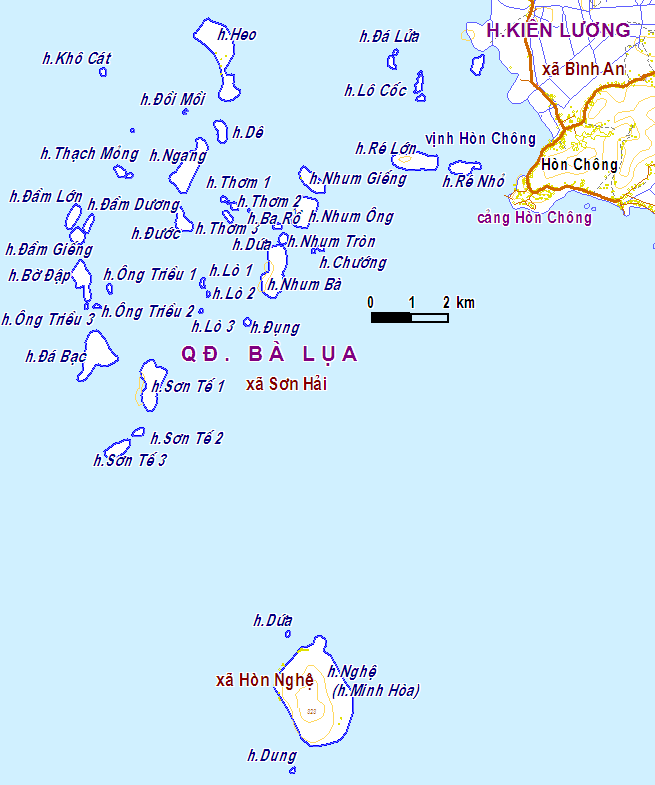
Bà Lụa Islands

The archipelago, formed from lower-mid Paleozoic sedimentary rocks, consists of about 34 (or 42) islands spreading out over a 70-square-kilometer (27 sq mi) water area. The area of the islands is about 5 square kilometers (1.9 sq mi). Hòn Heo is the largest entity. Re Lớn has the highest peak of 124 meters (407 ft). Apart from Hòn Heo, none of the rest have a highest point exceeding 100 m (330 ft). The most populous islands are Hòn Heo, Hòn Ngang and Hòn Nhum. The sea area around the archipelago is shallow, and in many places, people can even walk from island to island during low tide.

Hòn Heo (literally "Pig Island") is the largest island of Bà Lụa. It is approximately 7 kilometers (4.3 mi) in circumference and has an area of 1.5 km^{2} (0.6 sq mi). with a peak of 102 m (335 ft). Its name originates from the fact that the French built a piggery on the island in 1918. Here lies the People's Committee Head Office of Son Hai Commune.

Incomplete list of islands

- Hòn Heo (largest island)
- Hòn Ba Rồ
- Hòn Bờ Đập
- Hòn Chướng
- Hòn Dê
- Hòn Dứa
- Hòn Đá Bạc
- Hòn Đầm Lớn
- Hòn Đầm Dương
- Hòn Đầm Giếng
- Hòn Đồi Mồi
- Hòn Đụng
- Hòn Đước
- Hòn Khô Cát
- Hòn Lò 1
- Hòn Lò 2
- Hòn Lò 3
- Hòn Ngang
- Hòn Nhum Bà
- Hòn Nhum Giếng
- Hòn Nhum Ông
- Hòn Nhum Tròn
- Hòn Ông Triều 1
- Hòn Ông Triều 2
- Hòn Ông Triều 3
- Hòn Sơn Tế 1
- Hòn Sơn Tế 2
- Hòn Thạch Mỏng
- Hòn Thơm 1
- Hòn Thơm 2
- Hòn Thơm 3

== Administrative history ==
- On 14 January 1983, Kiên Hải District was formed with six communes including Bà Lụa Commune that administered Bà Lụa Islands.
- On 27 September 1983, Bà Lụa Commune was renamed to Sơn Hải Commune (Kiên Hải District).
- On 17 August 2000, Sơn Hải Commune was placed under the administration of Kiên Lương District.

== See also ==
- Nam Du Islands
