= Ko Rang, Ko Chang =

Island in eastern Thailand

Coordinates: 11°48′N 102°23′E

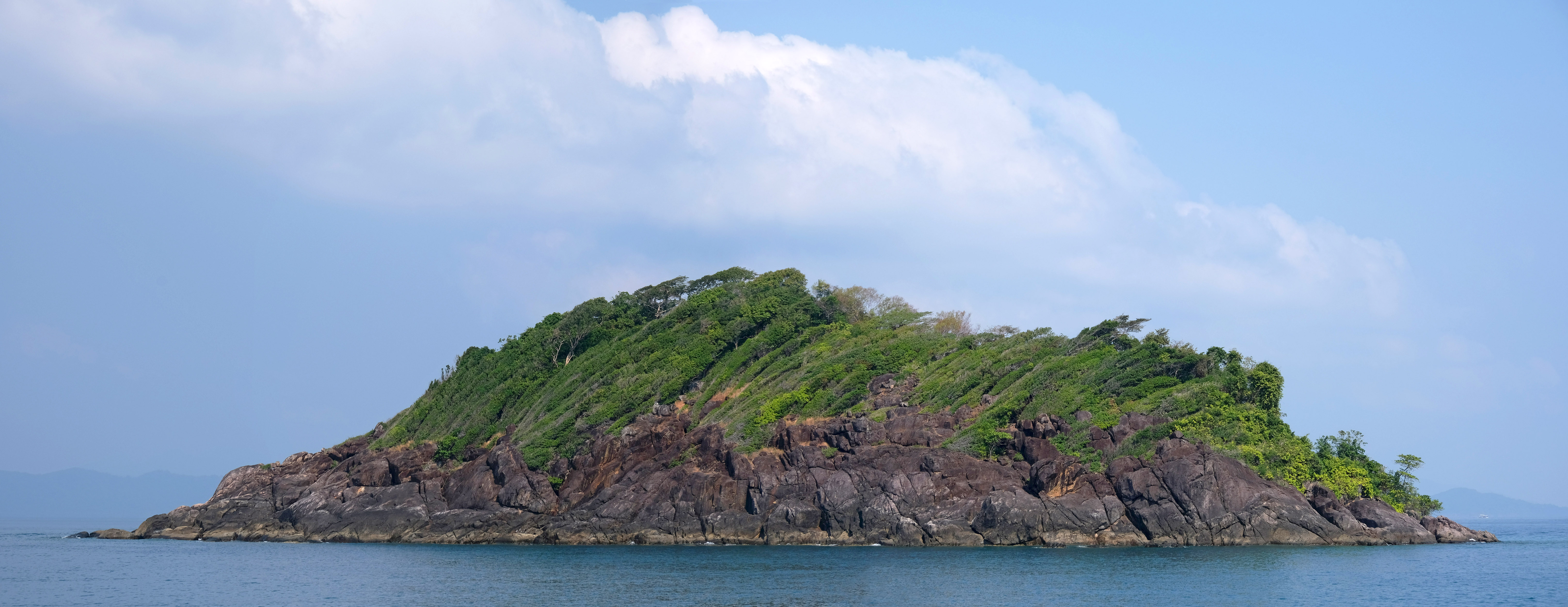
Small island next to Ko Rang.

Ko Rang (Thai: เกาะรัง, pronounced [kɔ̀ʔ rāŋ]) is an island in the southwestern part of the Ko Chang archipelago on the southeastern edge of the Gulf of Thailand. The island rises up out of 60m of water in most places and has few beaches. The southeastern corner of the island offers a reasonable anchorage and the Thai Coast Guard has deployed several mooring buoys in this area for dive boats. There is a small Buddhist shrine on the beach adorned with phallic fertility statues. The small island of Ko Tun lies across a narrow channel to the south where fishing boats take shelter from the southwest monsoon.
