= Ko Losin =

Islet in the Gulf of Thailand

Native name: เกาะโลซิน
- Location within Thailand Location within South China Sea

Geography
- Location: South China Sea
- Coordinates: 7°19′N 101°56′E
- Highest elevation: 10 m (30 ft)

Administration
- Thailand
- Province: Pattani

Ko Losin (Thai: เกาะโลซิน, Thai pronunciation: [kɔ̀ʔ loːsin]) is a small rocky islet in the southern area of the Gulf of Thailand. It is under the Panare District (administrative area) of the Pattani Province of Thailand.

Owing to the islet's relative remoteness, the area around Ko Losin is a good diving spot, where sharks and mantas thrive undisturbed.

== Territorial dispute ==
Though barren and uninhabited, Ko Losin, along with the islet of Ko Kra (8°23′49″N 100°44′13″E) form the basis of a maritime territorial dispute. The dispute over the continental shelf boundary between Malaysia and Thailand arises from the different baselines which the two countries adopt in calculating the equidistant line for boundary. Thailand's proclaimed baseline runs from the terminus at Kuala Tabar (the eastern terminus of the Malaysia-Thailand land border as defined by the Anglo-Siamese Treaty of 1909) northwards to Ko Losin islet and then northwestwards to Ko Kra. Malaysia however does not regard Ko Losin as a valid baseline point and calculates the equidistant line on a baseline running along the shore.

== See also ==
- List of islands of Thailand
- Anglo-Siamese Treaty of 1909
