= Thochu bent-toed gecko =

Scientific classification
- Kingdom: Animalia
- Phylum: Chordata
- Class: Reptilia
- Order: Squamata
- Suborder: Gekkota
- Family: Gekkonidae
- Genus: Cyrtodactylus
- Species: C. thochuensis

Binomial name
- Cyrtodactylus thochuensis Ngo, Tri, & Grismer, 2012

Species of lizard

The Thochu bent-toed gecko (Cyrtodactylus thochuensis) is a species of gecko that is endemic to Thổ Chu Island in southwestern Vietnam.
