= Ko Kra =

Archipelago in the Gulf of Thailand

Native name: เกาะกระ
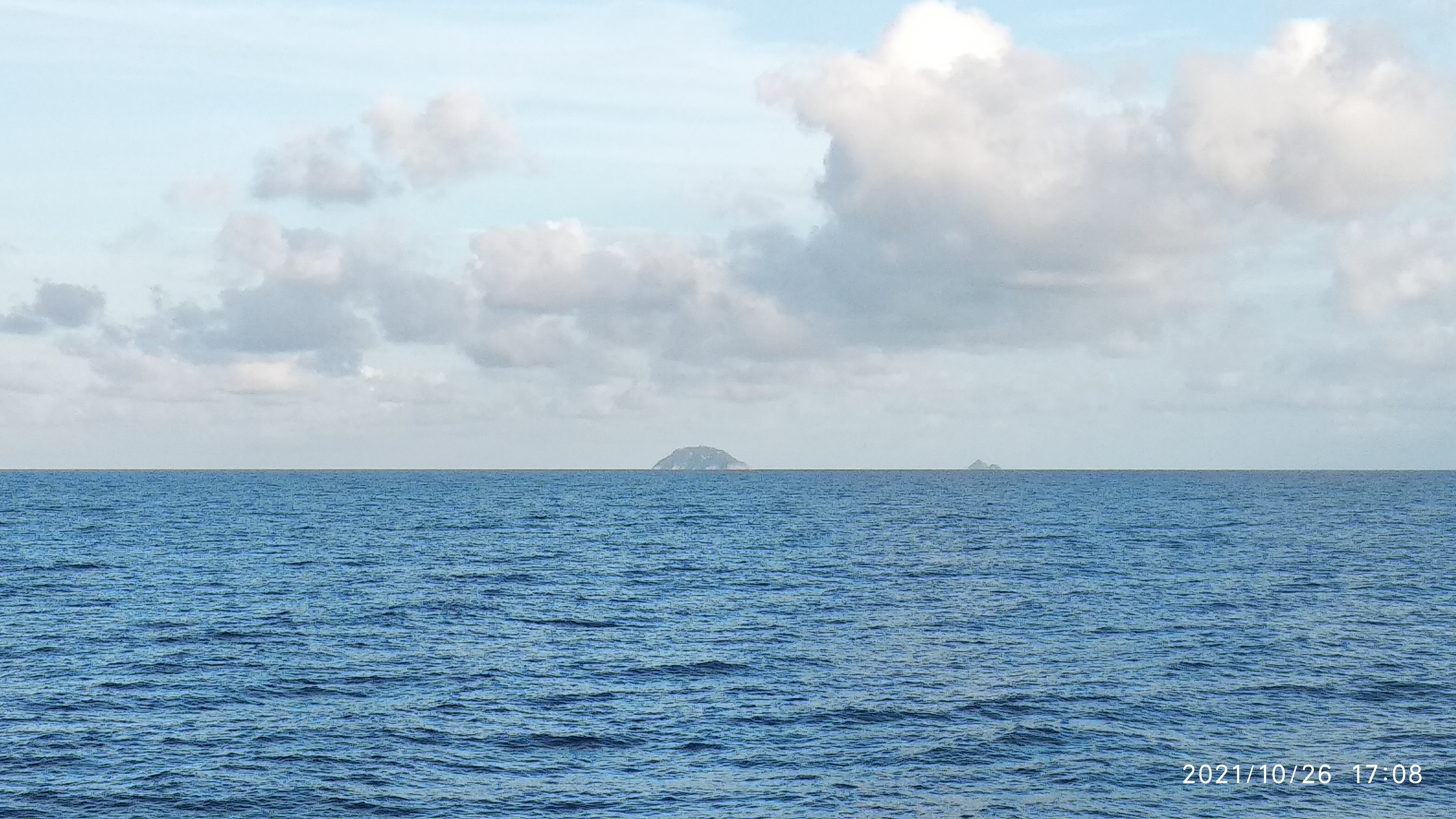
- Ko Kra and Hin Sung islands

- Location within Thailand Location within Gulf of Thailand

Geography
- Location: Gulf of Thailand
- Coordinates: 8°23′49″N 100°44′13″E
- Archipelago: Ko Kra
- Total islands: 3
- Highest elevation: 18 m (59 ft)

Administration
- Thailand
- Province: Nakhon Si Thammarat

Ramsar Wetland
- Official name: Ko Kra Archipelago
- Designated: 12 August 2013
- Reference no.: 2152

Ko Kra (Thai: เกาะกระ, pronounced [kɔ̀ʔ kràʔ]) is a group of small rocky islets in the southern area of the Gulf of Thailand. It is under the administration of Nakhon Si Thammarat Province of Thailand.

This islet group should not be confused with other islands of the same name: Ko Kra in Chumphon Province or Mu Ko Kra (หมู่เกาะกระ) a group of islets to the west of Ko Mak in Trat Province. There is also a place by the name of Ko-kra in Kayah State, mainland Myanmar.

== Geography ==
Ko Kra, about 54 km from the nearest shore, consists of three islets: Ko Kra Yai, Ko Kra Klang, and Ko Kra Lek, as well as one small rocky outcrop, Hin Ko Kra. The area surrounding these islets is a good diving spot owing to its relative remoteness.

== Territorial dispute ==
The Ko Kra group, although barren and uninhabited, is part of a territorial dispute along with the islet of Ko Losin. The dispute over the continental shelf boundary between Malaysia and Thailand arises from the different baselines which the two countries adopt in calculating the equidistant line for boundary. Thailand's proclaimed baseline runs from the terminus at Kuala Tabar (the eastern terminus of the Malaysia-Thailand land border as defined by the Anglo-Siamese Treaty of 1909) northwards to Ko Losin islet and then northwestwards to Ko Kra. Malaysia however does not regard Ko Losin as a valid baseline point and calculates the equidistant line on a baseline running along the shore. India has shown support for the Thais, calling for an end to the dispute.

== See also ==
- List of islands of Thailand
- Anglo-Siamese Treaty of 1909
