= Phú Quý =

Phú Quý Đặc khu Phú Quý
- Special administrative region
- Phú Quý special administrative region
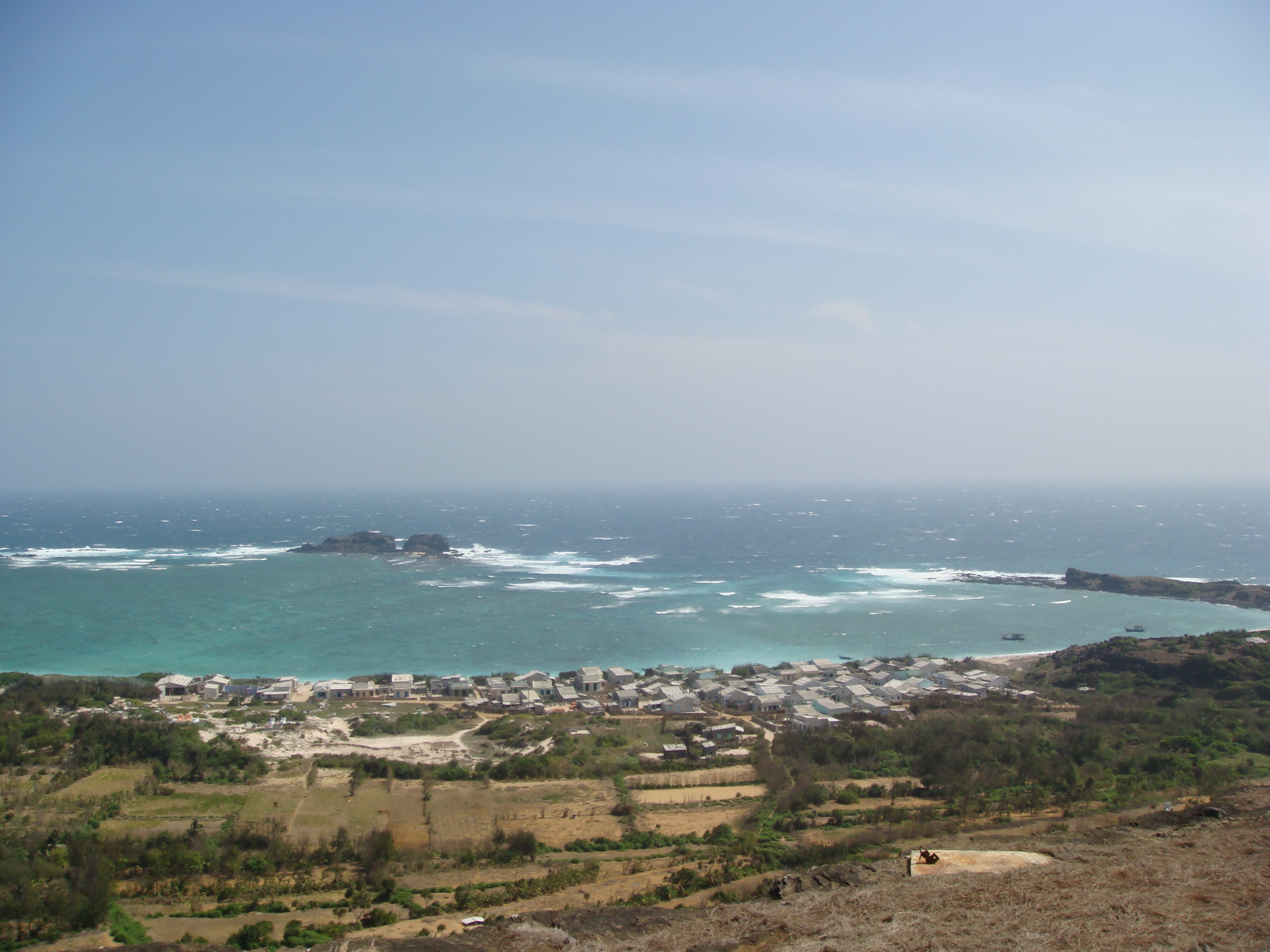
- View from Linh Sơn pagoda
- Nickname: "The Anchor of the Motherland" (Mỏ Neo Tổ Quốc)
- Location within Vietnam
- Coordinates: 10°32′N 108°57′E
- Country: Vietnam
- Region: South Central Coast
- Province: Lâm Đồng Province

Population (2023)
  - Total: 30.000
- Time zone: UTC+7 (Indochina Time)
- ZIP code: 800000
- Website: https://phuquy.binhthuan.gov.vn/

Phú Quý is a small island located about 100 km south-east of the city of Phan Thiết, Vietnam. The island contains three communes, with a population of 30,000 people. The island is home to Phu Quy Lighthouse (Hải đăng Phú Quý) situated in the north-west of the island and an abandoned military bunker on the eastern coast.

During French colonial days, the official name of the island was Poulo-Cécir-de-Mer (sometimes written as Pulau Cecir de Mer).

== Geography ==
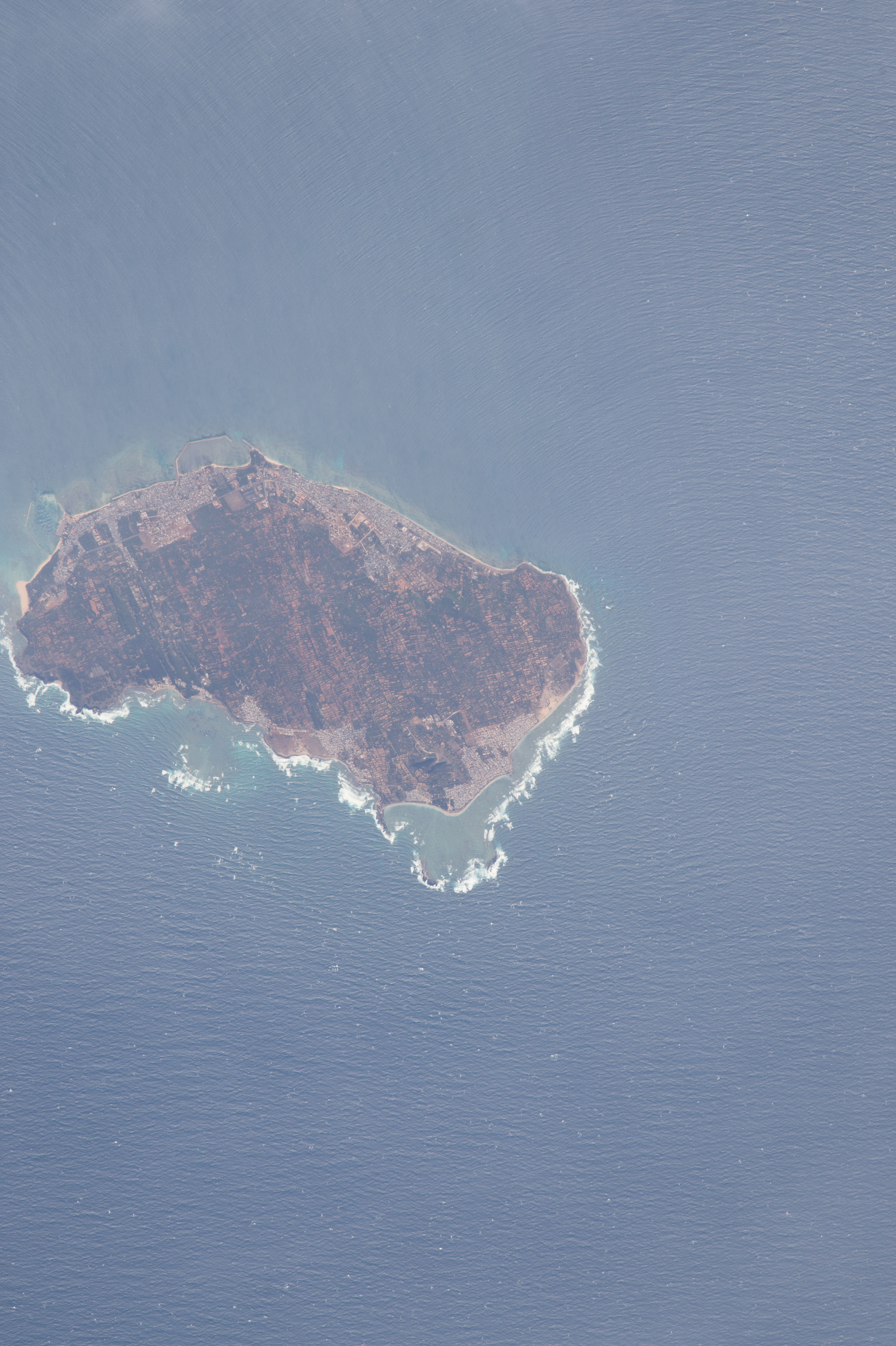
Satellite image of Phú Quý Island

Phú Quý comprises a total of ten islands, with Phú Quý Island being the largest. The island is 16.5 km^{2} (6.4 sq mi) in area. The island is 100 km southeast of Phan Thiết, 150 km south of Cam Ranh, 120 km east of Vũng Tàu, 333 km northeast of Côn Sơn and 540 km west of the Spratly Islands. The highest point on the island is Mount Cam Dat, at 106 m. The north of the island is rocky, while the south consists mostly of sand.

== Climate ==
Climate data for Phú Quý , Phan Thiet
Month	Jan	Feb	Mar	Apr	May	Jun	Jul	Aug	Sep	Oct	Nov	Dec	Year
Record high °C (°F)	31.4 (88.5)	31.7 (89.1)	33.3 (91.9)	35.5 (95.9)	35.7 (96.3)	36.6 (97.9)	34.7 (94.5)	34.0 (93.2)	34.4 (93.9)	33.6 (92.5)	32.7 (90.9)	31.4 (88.5)	36.6 (97.9)
Mean daily maximum °C (°F)	27.5 (81.5)	28.3 (82.9)	29.9 (85.8)	31.4 (88.5)	31.9 (89.4)	31.0 (87.8)	30.6 (87.1)	30.4 (86.7)	30.5 (86.9)	29.9 (85.8)	28.8 (83.8)	27.6 (81.7)	29.8 (85.6)
Daily mean °C (°F)	25.0 (77.0)	25.5 (77.9)	26.7 (80.1)	28.3 (82.9)	29.2 (84.6)	28.7 (83.7)	28.3 (82.9)	28.2 (82.8)	28.1 (82.6)	27.5 (81.5)	26.7 (80.1)	25.6 (78.1)	27.3 (81.1)
Mean daily minimum °C (°F)	23.8 (74.8)	23.9 (75.0)	24.8 (76.6)	26.2 (79.2)	26.9 (80.4)	26.7 (80.1)	26.5 (79.7)	26.5 (79.7)	26.2 (79.2)	25.6 (78.1)	25.2 (77.4)	24.4 (75.9)	25.6 (78.1)
Record low °C (°F)	19.7 (67.5)	21.0 (69.8)	20.7 (69.3)	22.7 (72.9)	22.8 (73.0)	22.3 (72.1)	22.8 (73.0)	22.7 (72.9)	21.5 (70.7)	22.1 (71.8)	20.3 (68.5)	20.6 (69.1)	19.7 (67.5)
Average precipitation mm (inches)	16.6 (0.65)	5.3 (0.21)	29.9 (1.18)	42.4 (1.67)	134.5 (5.30)	148.1 (5.83)	128.5 (5.06)	115.9 (4.56)	179.0 (7.05)	234.0 (9.21)	189.6 (7.46)	107.6 (4.24)	1,335 (52.56)
Average rainy days	3.4	1.6	2.4	4.8	13.4	15.8	15.7	15.7	16.4	16.6	12.6	8.5	127.1
Average relative humidity (%)	80.1	82.1	82.1	81.6	82.6	85.1	85.3	85.5	85.7	85.3	84.2	81.0	83.3
Mean monthly sunshine hours	235.4	250.6	288.4	282.2	262.0	213.2	223.2	222.8	198.9	191.0	181.6	185.8	2,724.2
Source: Vietnam Institute for Building Science and Technology

== Administration ==
Phú Quý island has three communes:

- Ngũ Phụng: Phú An (1), Thương Châu (2), Quý Thạnh (3)
- Tam Thanh: Mỹ Khê (4), Hội An (5), Triều Dương (6)
- Long Hải: Phú Long (7), Đông Hải (8), Quý Hải (9), Tân Hải (10).

Note: The numbers in parentheses () is the former village name.

== Tourism ==
Phú Quý calls for domestic and foreign investors to invest in the island to develop infrastructure, especially airports, and hotels to serve tourists.

Phu Quy's Tourism is based on cultural heritage, natural features, and seafood. However, in the long run, Phu Quy tourism is based on fishing villages, fisheries and beaches, islands, and mountains that are with limited development along with the local lifestyle. For the people on the island, the local lifestyle and environment contribute to tourism and sustainable development.

== Transportation ==
Transport routes connecting the mainland and Phú Quý island are limited. During calm seas, the journey by ferry can take up to six hours, limiting tourism. However, in mid-2010, the cooperative shipping company Fortune operated a mid-speed ferry, shortening travel time to Phú Quý island to approximately 2.5-3 hours.

The mid-speed ferry was stopped in 2015 and after a year was replaced with a ferry that takes 4 hours running alongside the 6-hour ferry. In 2018 the mid-speed ferry was reinstated and now travel to the island takes 2.5 hours in favourable conditions.

== See also ==
- List of islands of Vietnam
