= Bình Ba Island =

Island in Khánh Hòa Province, Vietnam

Bình Ba
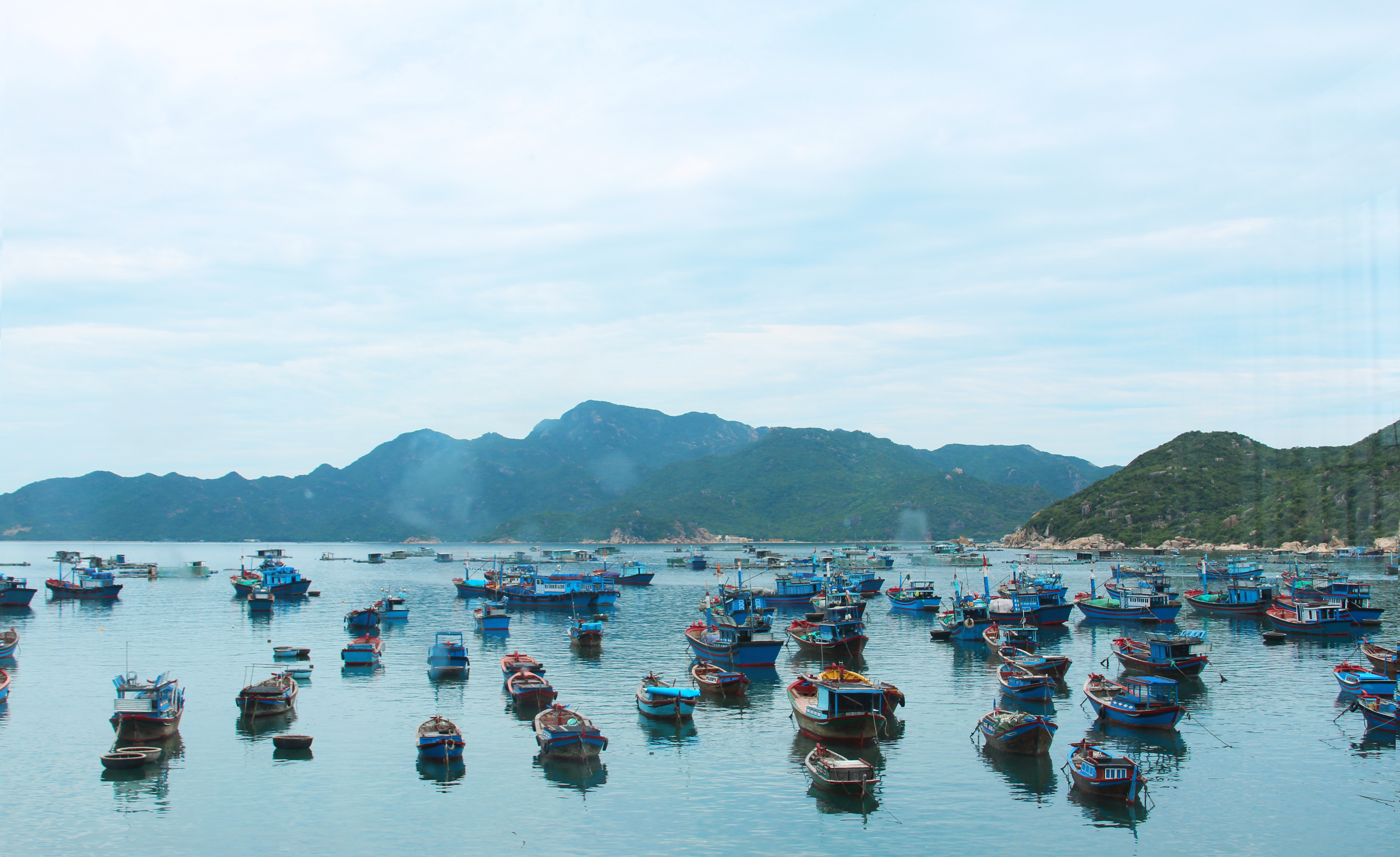
- Interactive map of Bình Ba

Geography
- Location: South China Sea
- Coordinates: 11.837678°N 109.240193°E
- Area: 3 km^{2} (1.2 sq mi)

Administration
- Vietnam
- Province: Khánh Hòa Province
- Commune: Nam Cam Ranh

Demographics
- Population: 5,000

Bình Ba (Bình Ba) is a small island in Nam Cam Ranh Commune, Khánh Hòa Province, Vietnam, with an area of more than 3 km^{2} (1.2 sq mi). The island lies in Cam Ranh Bay and is about 60 km (37 mi) south of Nha Trang and 15 km (9.3 mi) east of Ba Ngòi Port.

Bình Ba is part of the "Tứ Bình" ("Four Bình" sites) tourism area in Khánh Hòa, together with Bình Hưng Island, Bình Lập beach, and Bình Tiên. Vietnamese media have nicknamed the area the "Maldives of Vietnam", and Bình Ba has also been called the "lobster island".

Local fishers say that "Bình" in the island's name may refer either to "peaceful" (bình yên) or to Bình Định, as a way of remembering ancestors who migrated from Bình Định and settled on the island around the late 17th to early 18th centuries. The island has four hamlets: Bình Hưng, Bình An, Bình Ba Đông, and Bình Ba Tây, with a population of about 5,000. Residents are concentrated around the pier extending toward Bãi Nồm, while the rest of the island is sparsely inhabited.

Bình Ba is known for its coastal scenery and white-sand beaches. Three of the best-known beaches are Bãi Chướng (rocky shore and clear water), Bãi Nồm (white sand and popular for swimming among locals), and Bãi Nhà Cũ (noted for its sea urchins). The island also has a number of war-era relics dating from before 1975, and tourist attractions including Lăng Ngũ Hành and the Bình Ba village communal house.
