= Kiên Hải =

Coordinates: 10.000°N 104.750°E

Kiên Hải Đặc khu Kiên Hải
- Special administrative zone
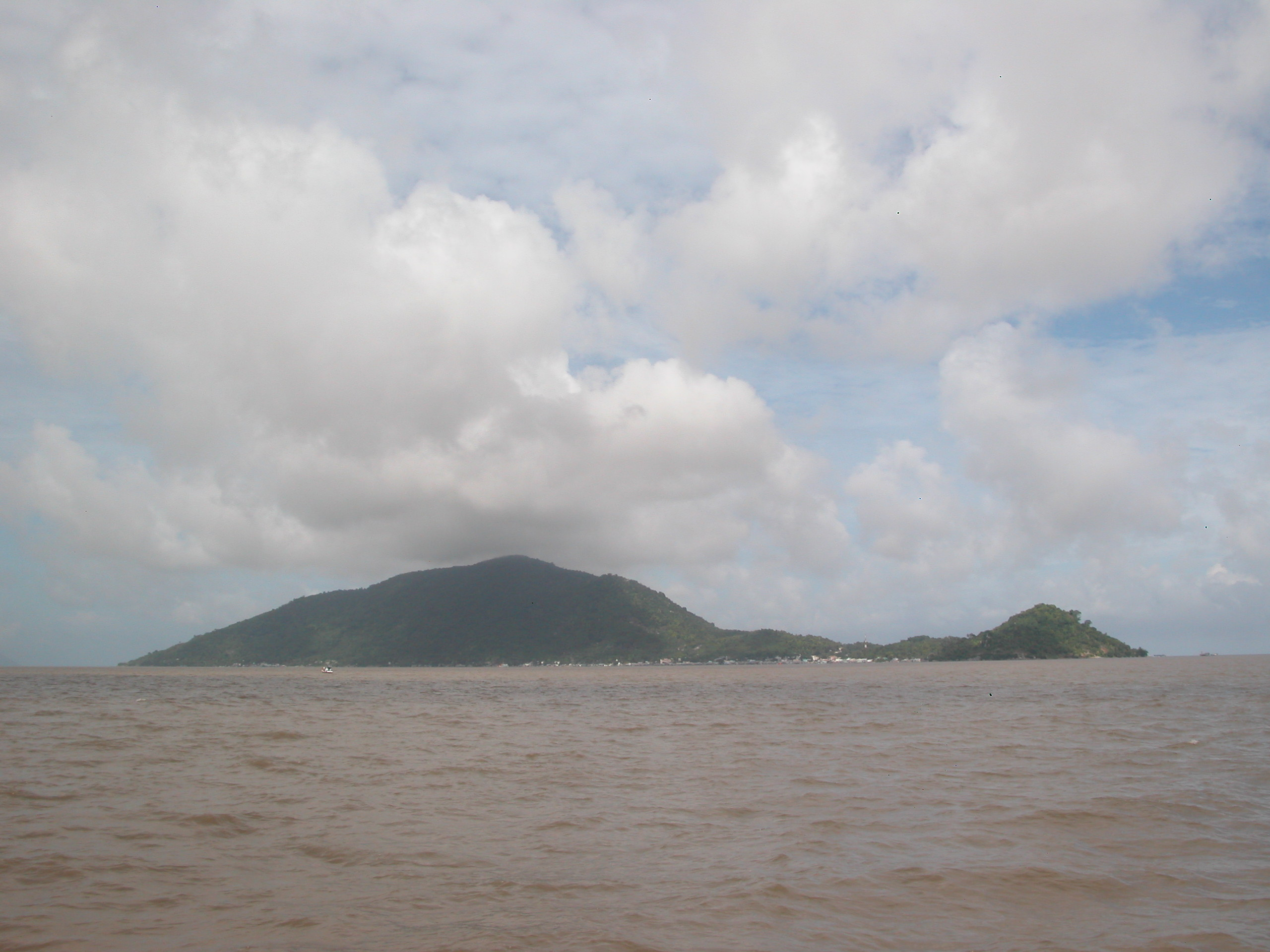
- Hon Tre islet

- Seal
- Interactive map of Kiên Hải
- Country: Vietnam
- Region: Mekong Delta
- Province: An Giang
- Capital: Hon Tre

Area
  - Total: 11 sq mi (28 km^{2})

Population
  - Total: 20,807
- Time zone: UTC+7 (Indochina Time)
- Website: kienhai.kiengiang.gov.vn

Kiên Hải is a special administrative zone (đặc khu) of An Giang province in the Mekong Delta region of Vietnam. It consists of 23 islands, of which 11 are inhabited.

According to 2009 census, it has a population of 20,807, the main economy is fishing, aquaculture and tourism. The region covers an area of 28 km^{2} (11 sq mi), containing Hon Tre island, Hòn Sơn island and Nam Du Islands. The administrative center lies at Hon Tre island.

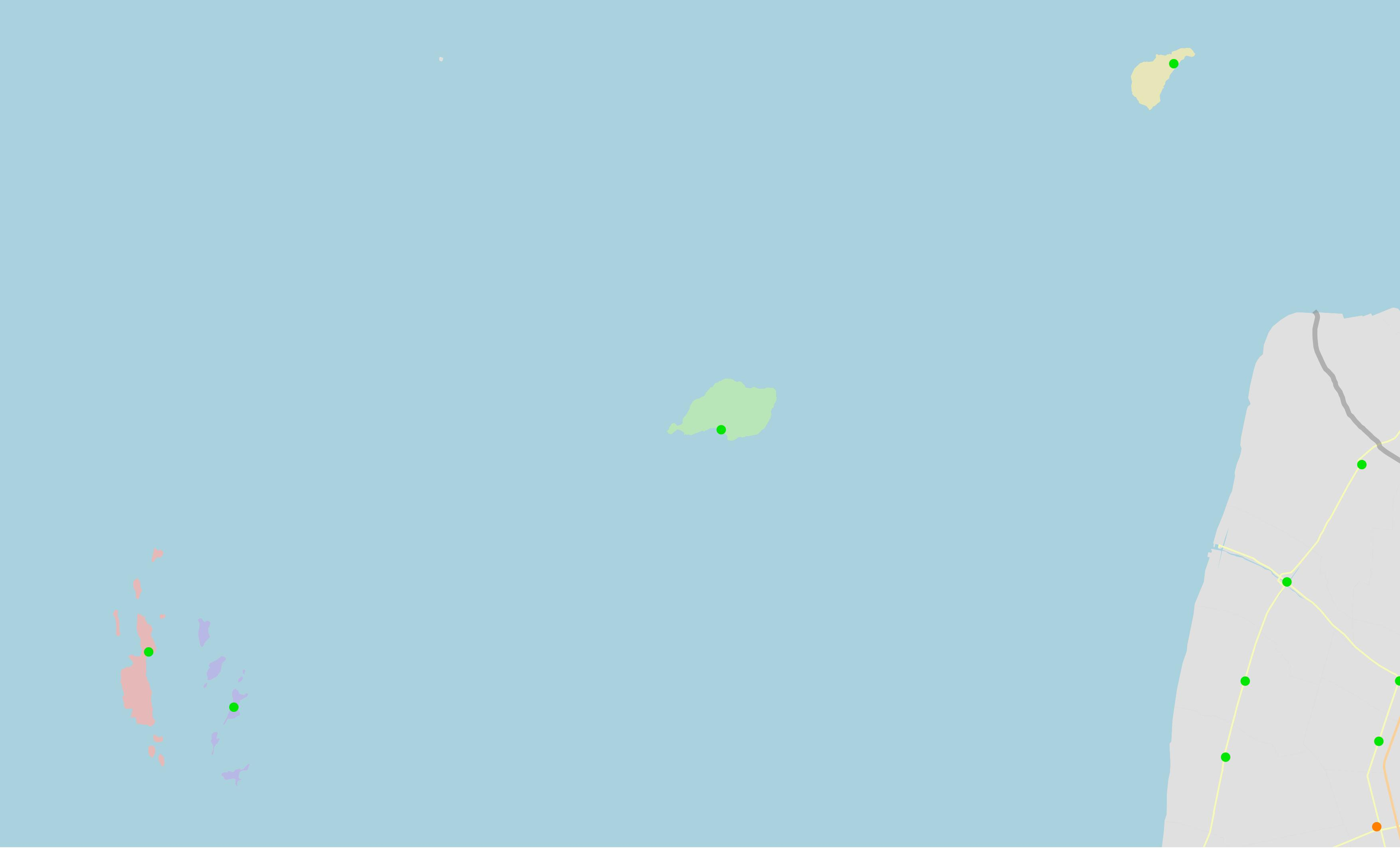
Nam Du Islands (left), Hòn Sơn island (center) and Hon Tre island (upper right)

The region includes four communes - Hòn Tre, Lại Sơn, An Sơn and Nam Du.
