= Ko Man Nok =

Island in Thailand

Coordinates: 12.5703°N 101.7002°E

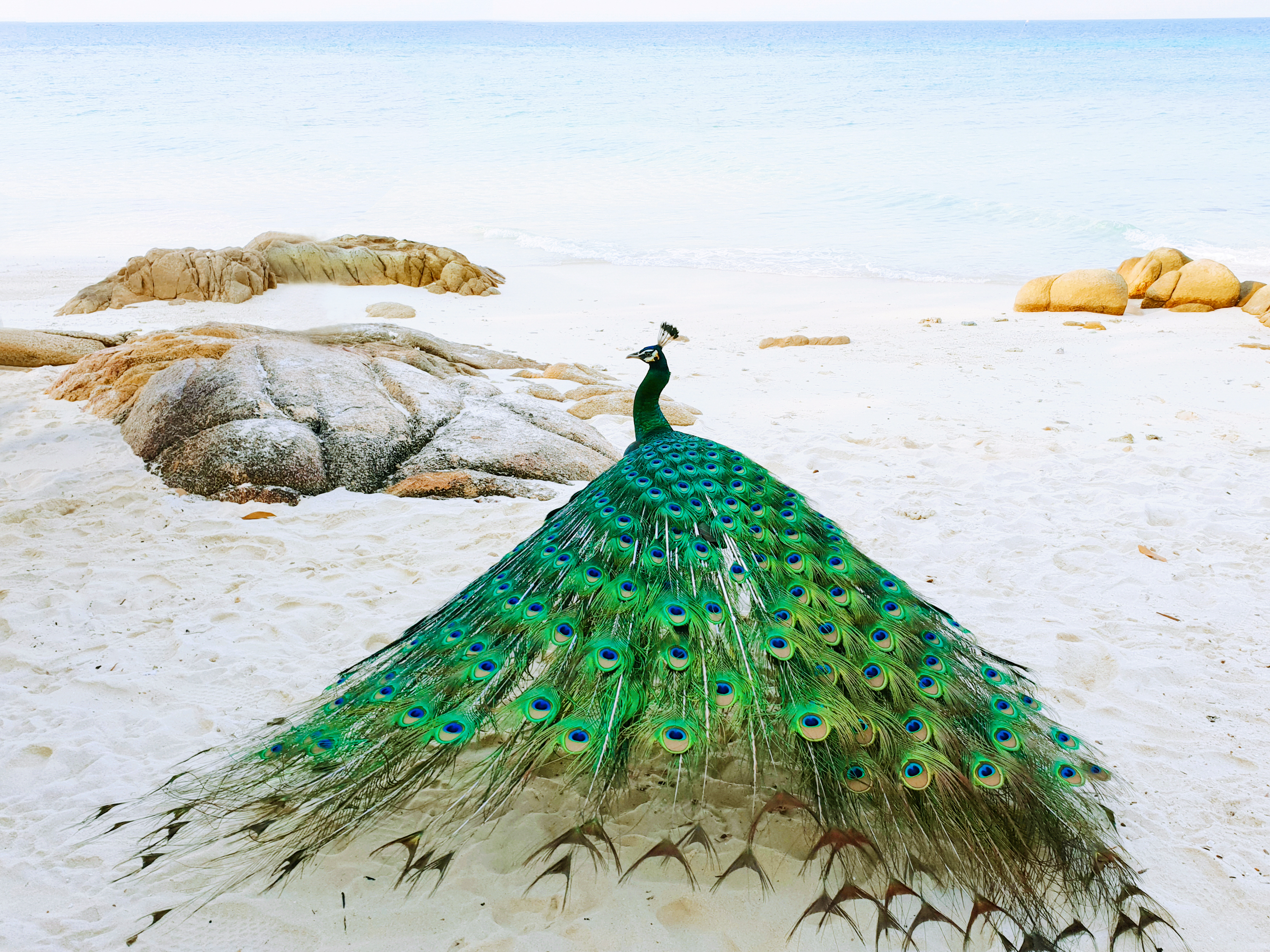
Peacock Island aka Ko Man Nok

Ko Man Nok (Thai: เกาะมันนอก, pronounced [kɔ̀ʔ mān nɔ̂ːk]; also spelled Koh Munnork) is a small private island, among a group of islands in the Klaeng Bay, Rayong Province, Thailand, called Man. The group includes Ko Man Nai, Ko Man Klang and Ko Man Nok islands. Ko Man Nok is approximately 0.2 square kilometres (0.077 sq mi) in size, and about 20 nautical miles away from Koh Samet, a 2½ hours journey from Bangkok. Ko Man Nok has only one resort, Koh Munnork Resort.

Activities at the resort include kayaking, snorkeling and fishing.
