= Thổ Châu islands =

Island group

Thổ Châu special zone Đặc khu Thổ Châu Quần đảo Thổ Châu
- Special Zone (Class-II)
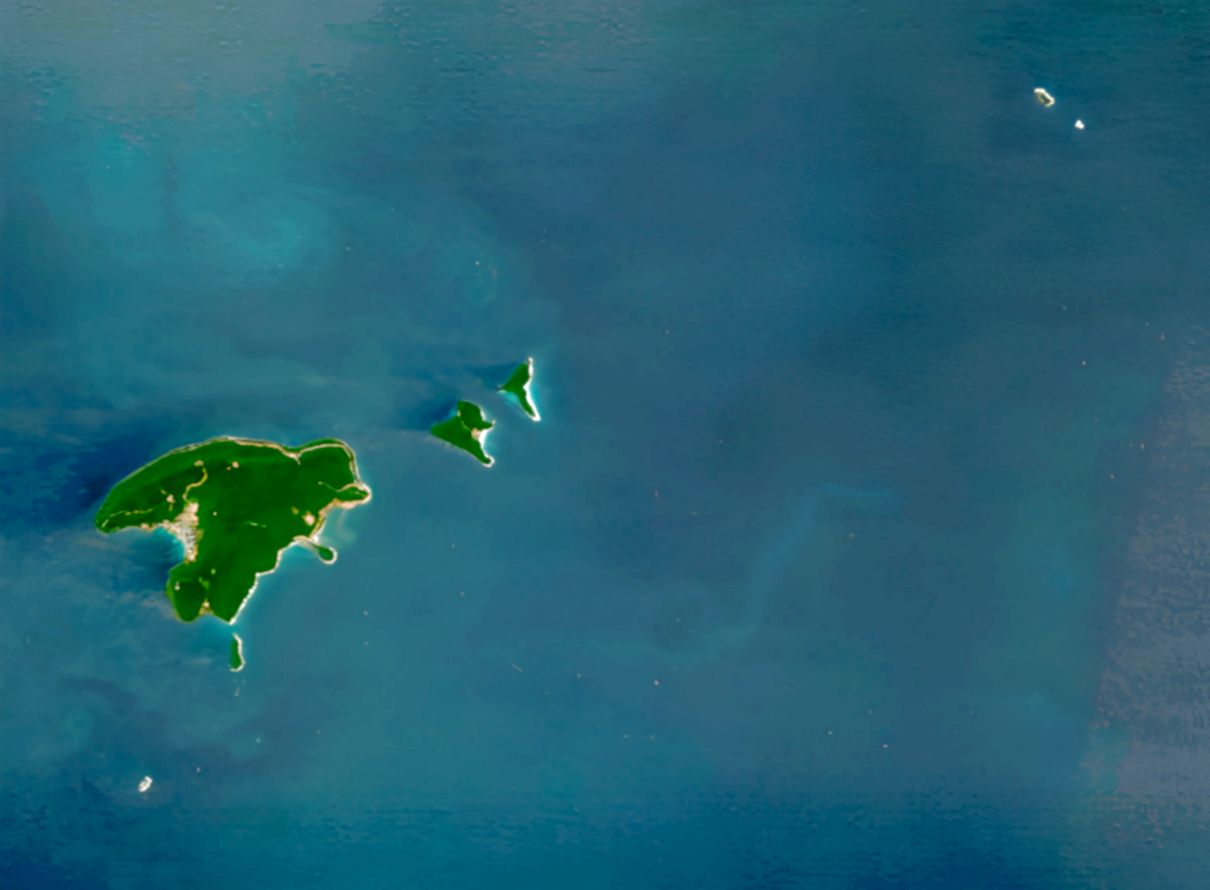
- Thổ Châu island was seen from satellites in 2024.
- Interactive map of Thổ Châu special zone
- Coordinates: 9°18′N 103°29′E
- Country: Vietnam
- Region: Mekong Delta; Gulf of Thailand
- Province: An Giang
- Establishment: XVI century
- Central hall: No.1, Bãi Ngự hamlet, Thổ Châu island

Government
  - Type: Commune-level authority

Area
  - Total: 13.98 km^{2} (5.40 sq mi)

Population (December 31, 2023)
  - Total: 1,829
  - Density: 130.8/km^{2} (338.8/sq mi)
- Time zone: UTC+7 (Indochina Time)
- ZIP code: 91000–92515 (Note: An official code from December 31, 2023, to present.)
- Website: thochau.angiang.gov.vn

Thổ Châu Islands (Vietnamese: Quần đảo Thổ Châu) is an archipelago in the Gulf of Thailand. It constitutes fully as Thổ Châu Special Zone of An Giang Province (Vietnamese: Đặc khu Thổ Châu trực thuộc tỉnh An Giang) belonging to new An Giang province in the Mekong Delta region of Vietnam.

== History ==
According to Đại Nam nhất thống địa dư chí, its name Thổ Châu was written as "土珠", which implies as a pearl in the middle of the sea. This way of calling has been assumed by the linguist Thiều Chửu to be similar to Pearl Harbor. (Note: Please see An Nam đại quốc họa đồ, southmost of Việt Nam.)

In the past, the archipelago was also known as Pulau Panjang (means "long island" in Malay language) or Pulo Panjang by navigators. (Note: The Project Gutenberg EBook of Embassy to the Eastern Courts of Cochin-China, Siam, and Muscat, by Edmund Roberts. Page 228.)

=== 20th century ===
During the existence of the Republic of Vietnam, Thổ Châu Islands were under the administration of An Xuyên Province. However, the islands historically used to constitute a disputed territory between Cambodia and Vietnam, both nations claiming them to be within their territorial waters.

On May 10, 1975, Khmer Rouge occupied Thổ Châu Island and abducted about five hundred civilians to Cambodia, all of whom were massacred. From May 24 to May 27, 1975, Vietnamese forces attacked the occupiers and recaptured the island. In 1977, the Khmer Rouge raided Thổ Châu Island once again but were defeated.

On April 27, 1992, under the arrangement of the People's Committee of Kiên Giang Province, six families with about thirty people moved to Thổ Châu Island and settled there. On April 24, 1993, the Vietnamese government decided to establish Thổ Châu commune (xã Thổ Châu).

=== 21st century ===
On March 8, 2014, Malaysia Airlines Flight 370 lost contact with ground while flying by Thổ Châu island.

According to the Statement on the basis of the territorial width in the Tonkin Gulf (Note: Nghị quyết số 68/NQ-UBTVQH15 ra ngày 14 tháng 02 năm 2025 của Ủy ban Thường vụ Quốc hội, Chính phủ Việt Nam, mang tên Tuyên bố về đường cơ sở dùng để tính chiều rộng lãnh hải Việt Nam trong vịnh Bắc Bộ.) and a number of related documents, Thổ Châu is considered by the Vietnamese press as the farthest place to the West to determine the above sovereignty of Vietnam on the ocean.

On February 24, 2025, at the 32nd Session of the 10th People's Council of Kiên Giang province, the delegates participated in the vote to officially approve the resolution of the establishment of Thổ Châu island district (huyện đảo Thổ Châu), which was based on the whole natural area and population of the islands or former commune.

== Geography ==
Thổ Châu island district is basically the whole area of Thổ Châu archipelago, not divided into commune-level administrative units like other localities.

It consists of the following eight islands : Thổ Châu with 13.95 square kilometres (5.39 sq mi), Hòn Cao, Hòn Cao Cát, Hòn Khô, Hòn Mô (or sometimes Hòn Cái Bàn), Hòn Nhạn, Hòn Từ and Hòn Xanh. (Note: "Hòn" means "isle" in Vietnamese language, but not "island".)

In particular, Hòn Nhạn is base point A1 on Vietnam's baseline.

Number	Name	Coordinate	Acreage (hectare)	Population	Note
1	Thổ Châu	9°18′29″N 103°29′05″E	1.240,2	1.912	The largest island.
2	Hòn Từ		91,10		
3	Hòn Cao Cát	9°19′33″N 103°31′34″E	41,82		
4	Hòn Xanh		14,11		
5	Hòn Nhạn	9°15′03″N 103°28′14″E	3,37		
6	Hòn Cái Bàn (Cao Cát Lớn)	9°22′59″N 103°38′20″E	3,34		
7	Hòn Đá Bạc (Cao Cát Nhỏ)		0,74		
8	Hòn Khô		0,48		

=== Topography ===
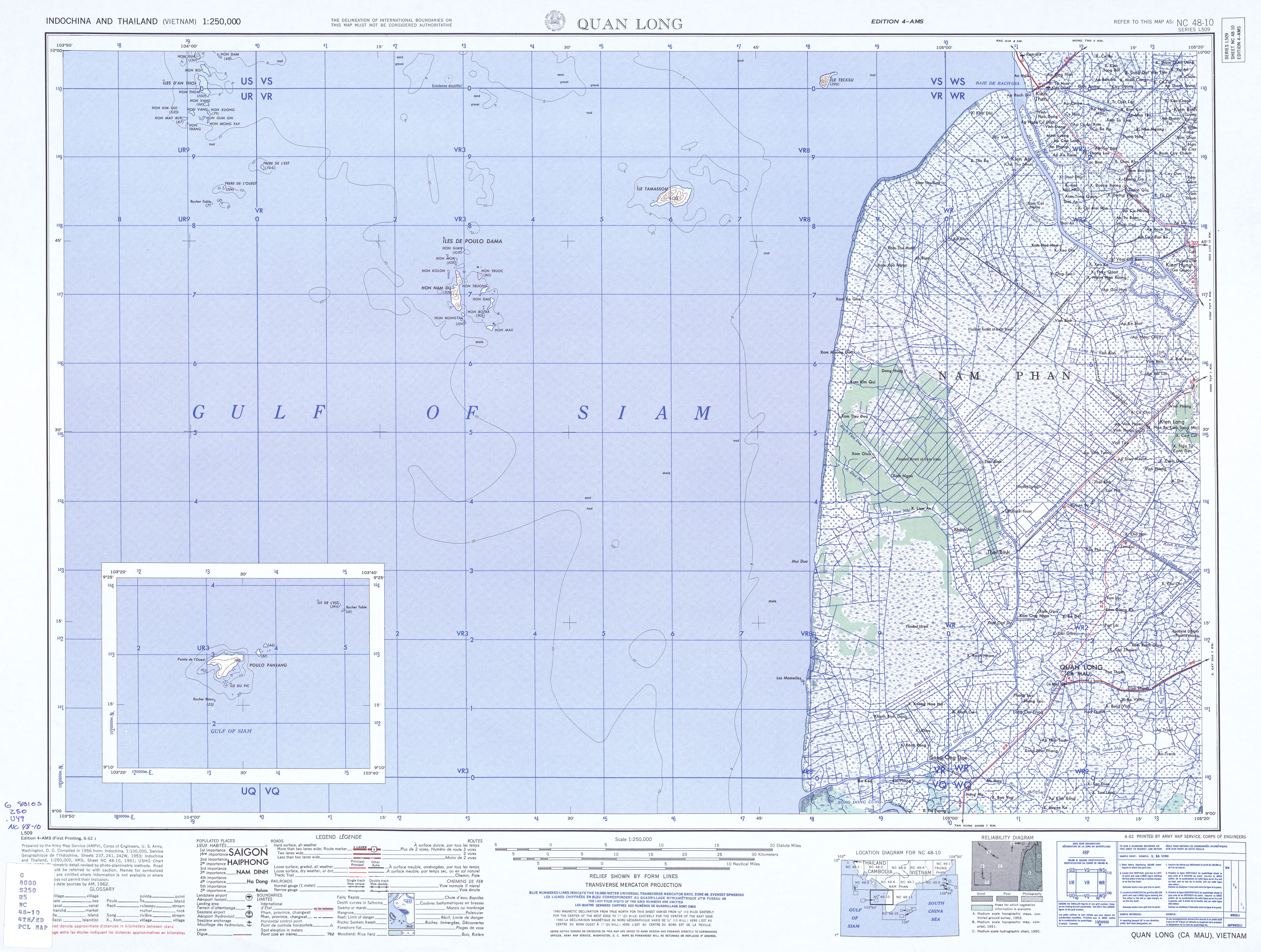
Map including the Thổ Châu Islands (inset) (AMS, 1956).

Thổ Châu Island - the largest entity of the archipelago - was first proposed as a marine protected area in 1995. Subsequently, Asian Development Bank proposed the establishment of a marine protected areas over Thổ Châu Island with an area of 22,400 hectares (86 sq mi), of which land area is 1,190 ha (4.6 sq mi) and sea area is 21,210 ha (81.9 sq mi).

=== Demography ===
Currently, Thổ Châu has about 500 households with nearly 2,000 inhabitants, most of whom are border guards and navy personnel who chose to settle on the islands; the rest are immigrants. Local residents' livelihood is providing service to fishing boats, small craft production, farming, animal husbandry and fishing along the coast.

== See also ==
- Phú Quốc Island
- Pirate Archipelago
