= Nam Du Islands =

Vietnamese islands

Native name: Quần đảo Nam Du
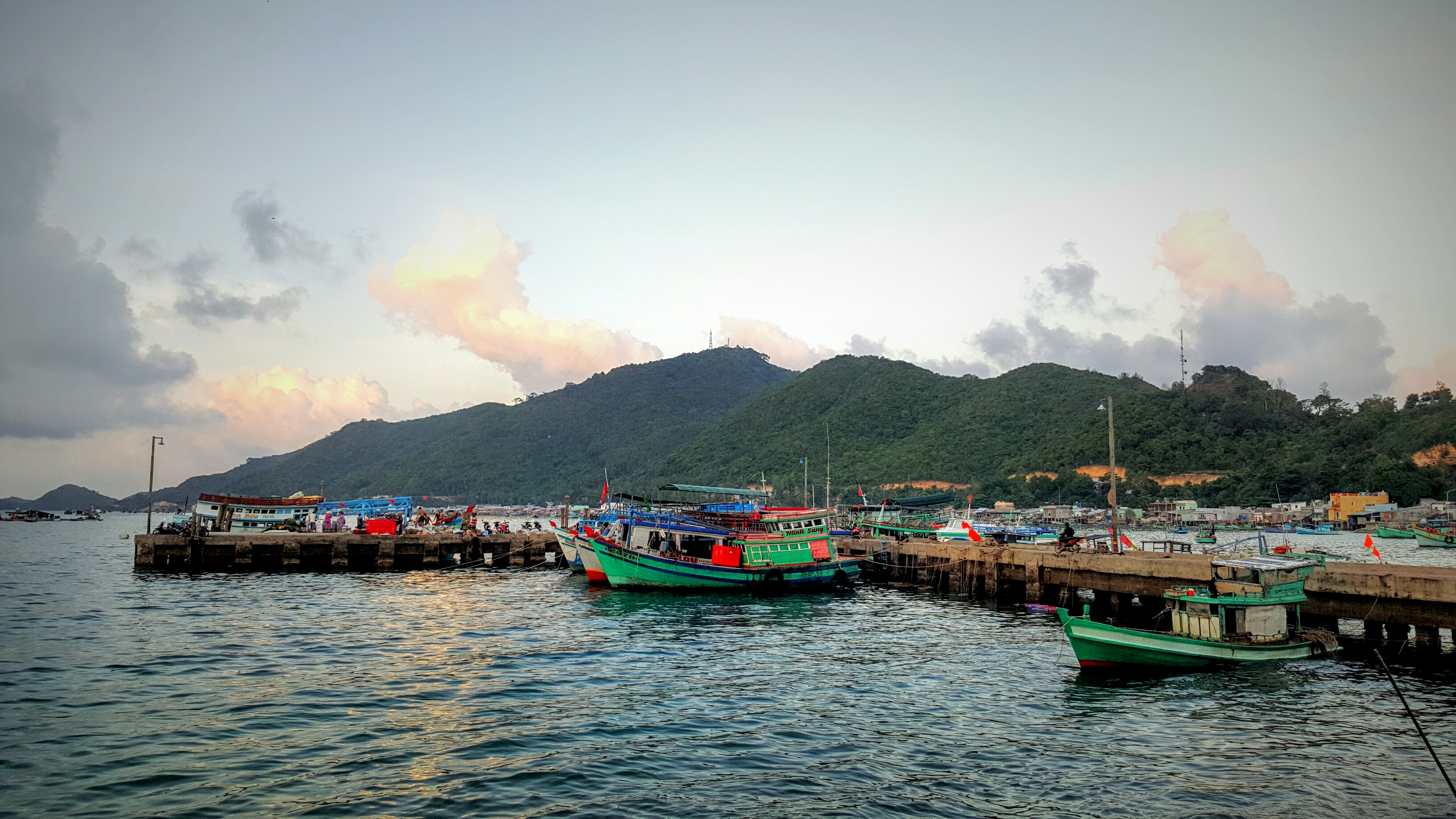
- An islet of Nam Du Islands

- Location within Vietnam
- Interactive map of Nam Du Islands

Geography
- Location: Gulf of Thailand
- Coordinates: 9°41′N 104°20′E
- Total islands: 21
- Major islands: Hòn Lớn
- Highest point: 309 meters on Hòn Lớn

Administration
- Vietnam
- Province: An Giang
- Special zone: Kiên Hải
- Commune: An Sơn and Nam Du Commune

Nam Du Islands (Vietnamese: Quần đảo Nam Du) is an archipelago located in the Gulf of Thailand, southeast of Phú Quốc Island. It constitutes An Sơn and Nam Du Commune of Kiên Hải special administrative zone, An Giang Province, Vietnam.

== Geography ==
The archipelago consists of 21 large and small islands. The largest island is Hòn Lớn (sometimes referred as Nam Du) Island with a peak of 309 m. Islands have tropical monsoon climate; the rainy season lasts from April to October every year.

List (not exhaustive) of Nam Du Islands

Commune An Sơn:

- Hòn Lớn (sometimes called just "Nam Du")
- Hòn Cò Lớn
- Hòn Dâm
- Hòn Khô
- Hòn Móng Tay
- Hòn Mốc
- Hòn Nhàn
- Hòn Nồm Trong
- Hòn Nồm Giữa
- Hòn Nồm Ngoài
- Hòn Ông
- Hòn Tre

Commune Nam Du:

- Hòn Trung
- Hòn Bờ Đập
- Hòn Bỏ Áo
- Hòn Đụng Lớn
- Hòn Đụng Nhỏ
- Hòn Mấu
- Hòn Ngang

== See also ==
- Bà Lụa Islands
