= Koh Rong Nang Training Buoy =

Technical Dive Site in Thailand

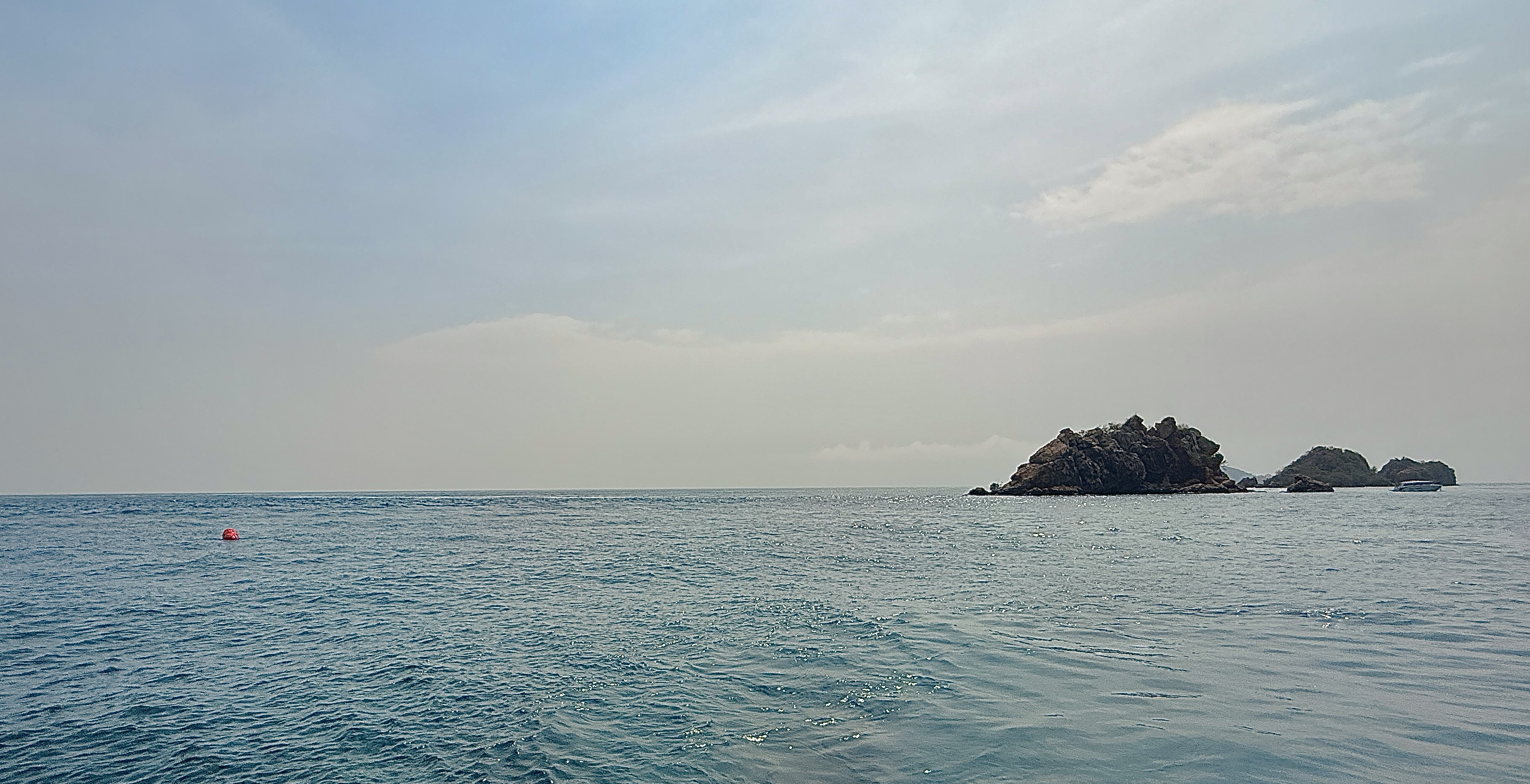
- Koh Rong Nang Training Buoy. Looking towards Koh Rong Nang

- Location within Thailand
- Location: Samae San Island, Thailand
- Waterbody: Gulf of Thailand
- Coordinates: 12°32.968′N 100°57.298′E
- Dive type: Technical
- Depth range: 50 m (160 ft)
- Entry type: Boat
- Bottom composition: Sandy Bottom
- Water: Salt
- Nearby sites: Samaesan Hole (100m), Sharkfin Deep Drop (85m), 1/4 Mile Mouthpiece Drop (75m), Thunder Bowl (65m), Narcosis Colosseum (50m), Hardeep Wreck (36m)

Koh Rong Nang Training Buoy is a technical diving site located in the Gulf of Thailand, Samae San Island, in Sattahip District, Chonburi Province. The local vicinity is renowned for its technical diving due to the high concentration of deep and easily accessible dive sites, with PADI referring to it as "Thailand's Hidden Gem for Tec Divers". The area has numerous entries on the List of deepest dive sites in the Gulf of Thailand, with Koh Rong Nang Training Buoy being recognised as the tenth deepest, with a depth of 50m. It lies just north-east of Koh Rong Nang and south of the Samaesan Hole. It can easily be identified by an obvious orange buoy.

== Diving history ==
The name of the dive site is due to local Navy Divers stationed near Chong Samaesan frequently using the this location and buoy for training purposes.

== Diving site hazards ==
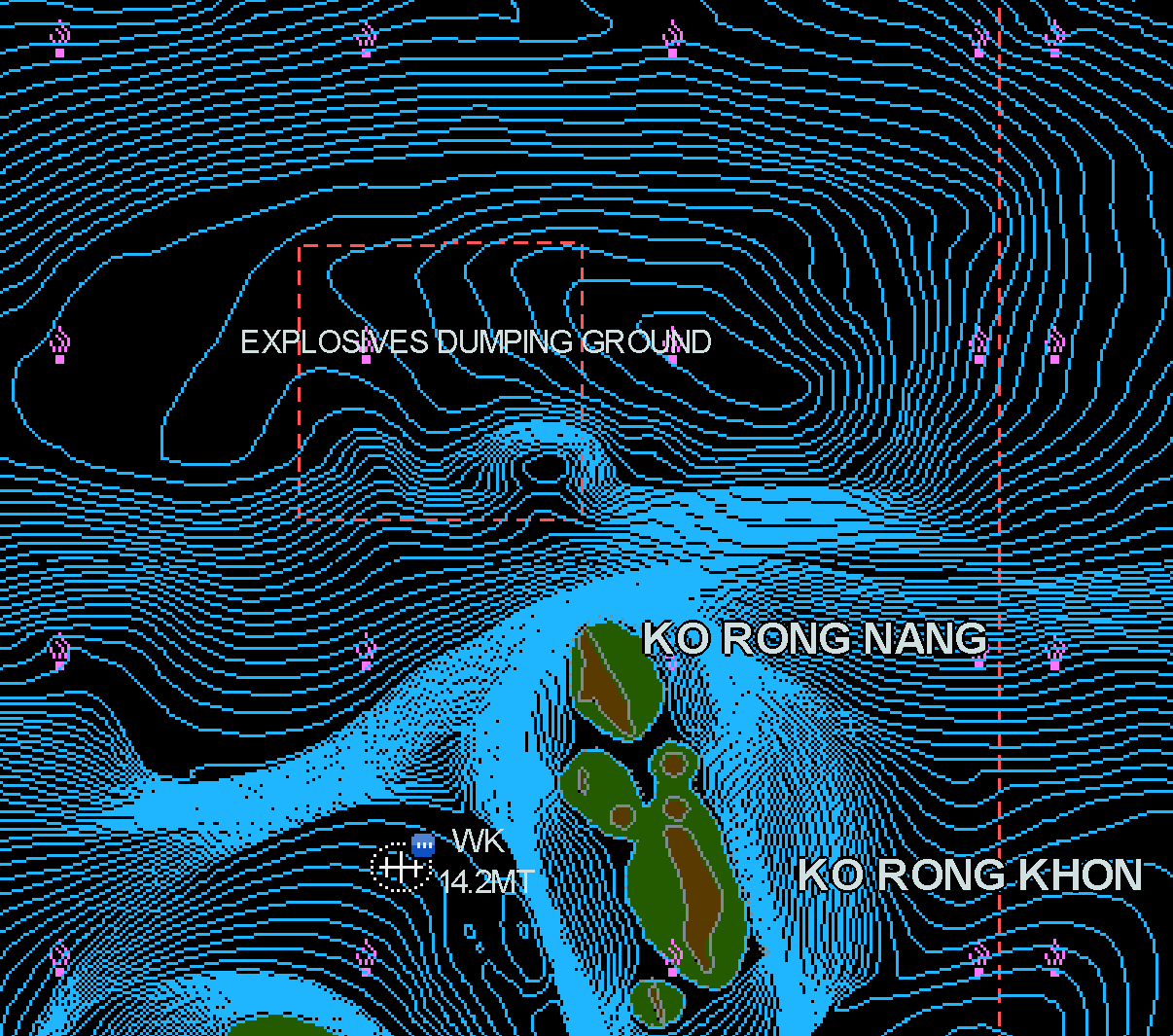
Koh Rong Nang - Adjacent to the Samaesan Hole

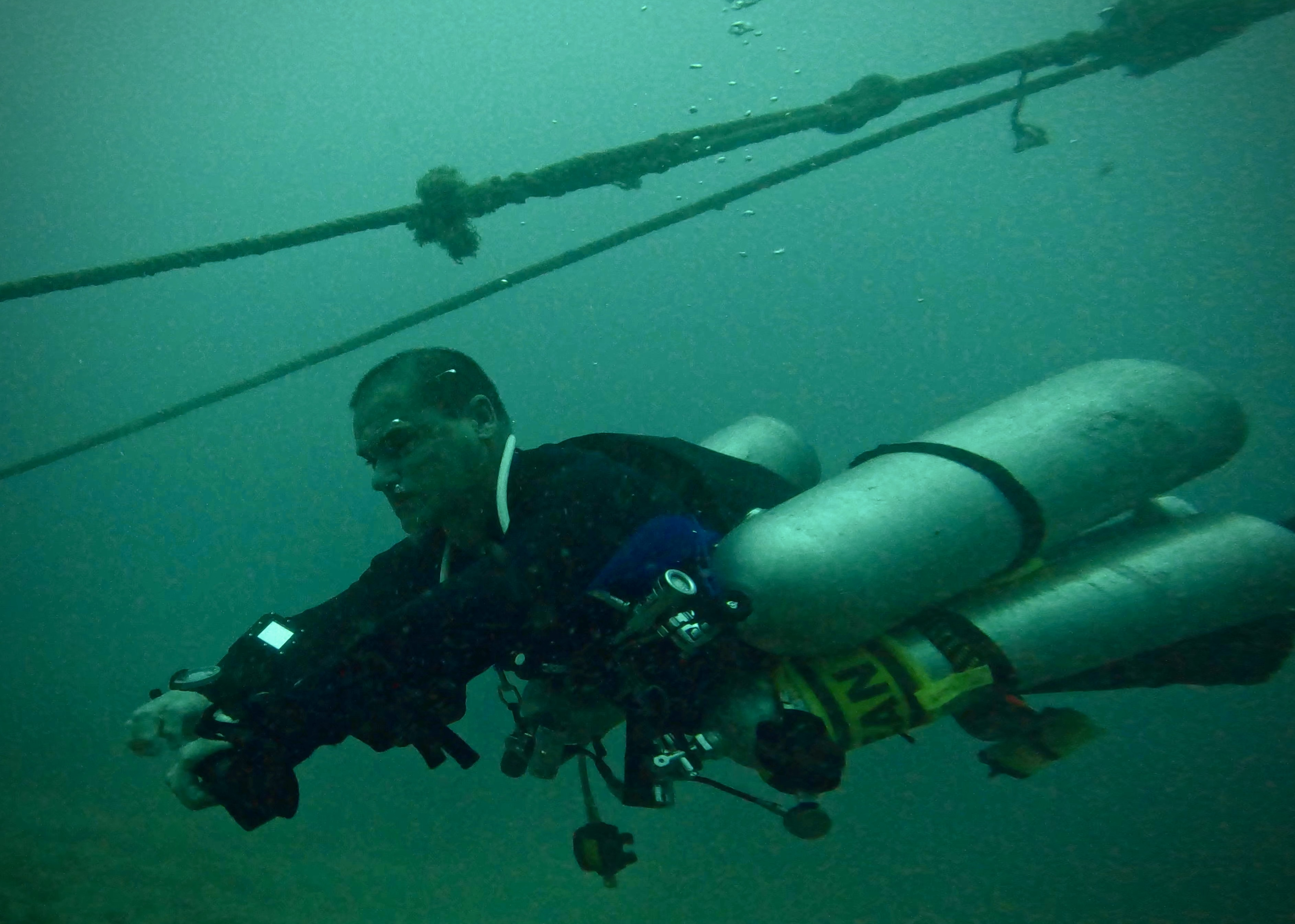
Koh Rong Nang Technical Dive Site Samaesan: Skills practice

The dive site is in close proximity to the Samaesan Hole - which is reported as one of the most extreme dive sites in the world Koh Rong Nang is recognised as having similar hazards associated with it with the possibility of currents pushing divers down in to the Hole.

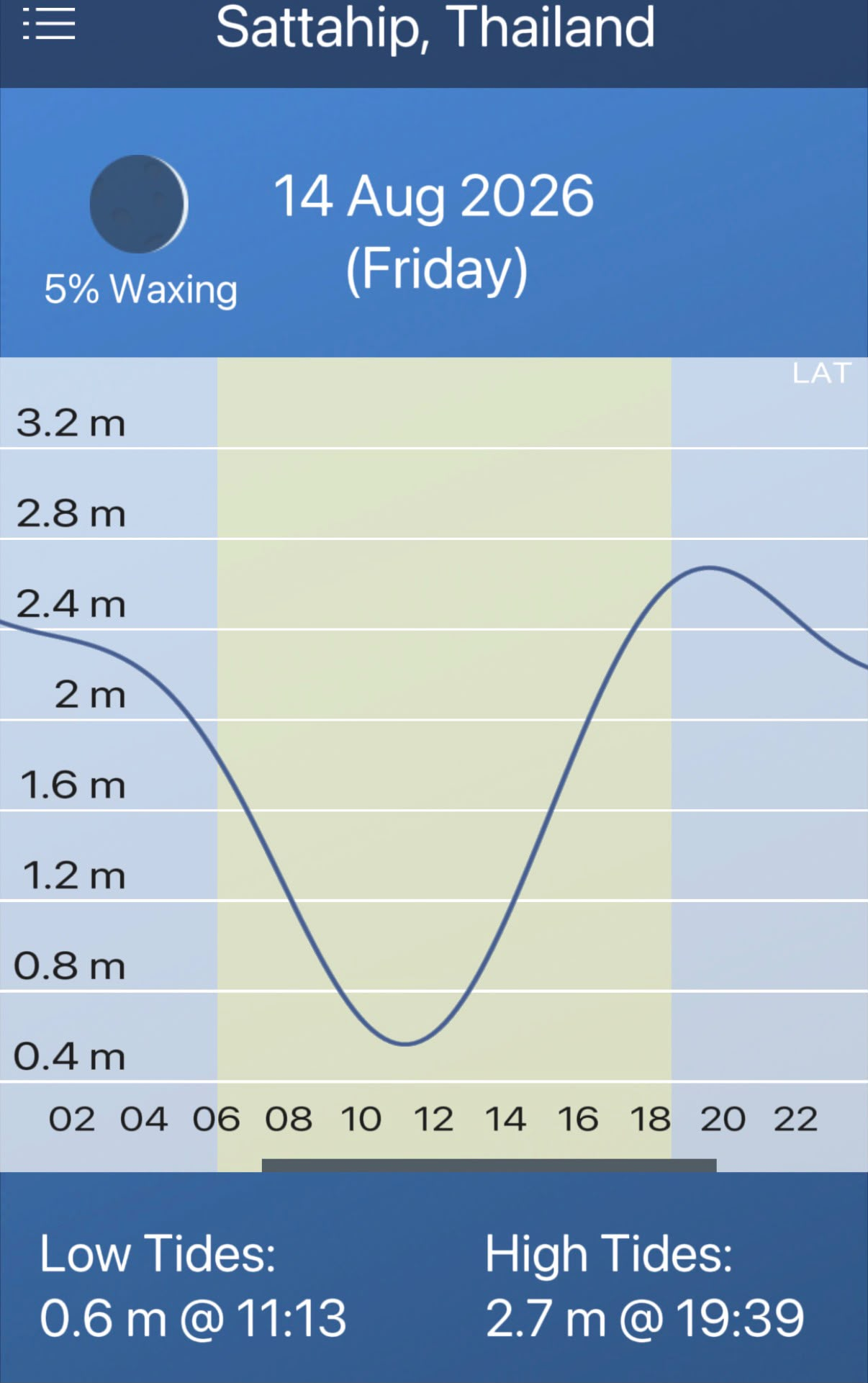
Large tidal ranges in the area cause strong and unpredictable currents

- Depth - The line for Koh Rong Nang Training Buoy descends down to 37m. By following the reef north divers can get down to 50m before it starts descending down in to the Samaesan Hole. At this depth divers on air can start feeling the effects of Gas Narcosis
- Low Visibility - This can reduce down to 5-10m so meticulous dive planning is required.
- Darkness - Light is limited at the bottom, compounding the poor visibility. Torches and back-ups are required.
- Strong & Unpredictable Currents - This is caused by a large tidal range and underlying topology. Down currents are also a common occurrence. It is advised to dive this site in slack tide and have robust surface support to prevent being swept out to sea. Divers have had to have been rescued because of these conditions.
- Commercial Shipping Lane - The dive site is adjacent to a commercial shipping lane. Strong currents have the potential of pulling the divers in to this area so care must be taken.
