= Narcosis Colosseum =

Technical Dive Site in Thailand

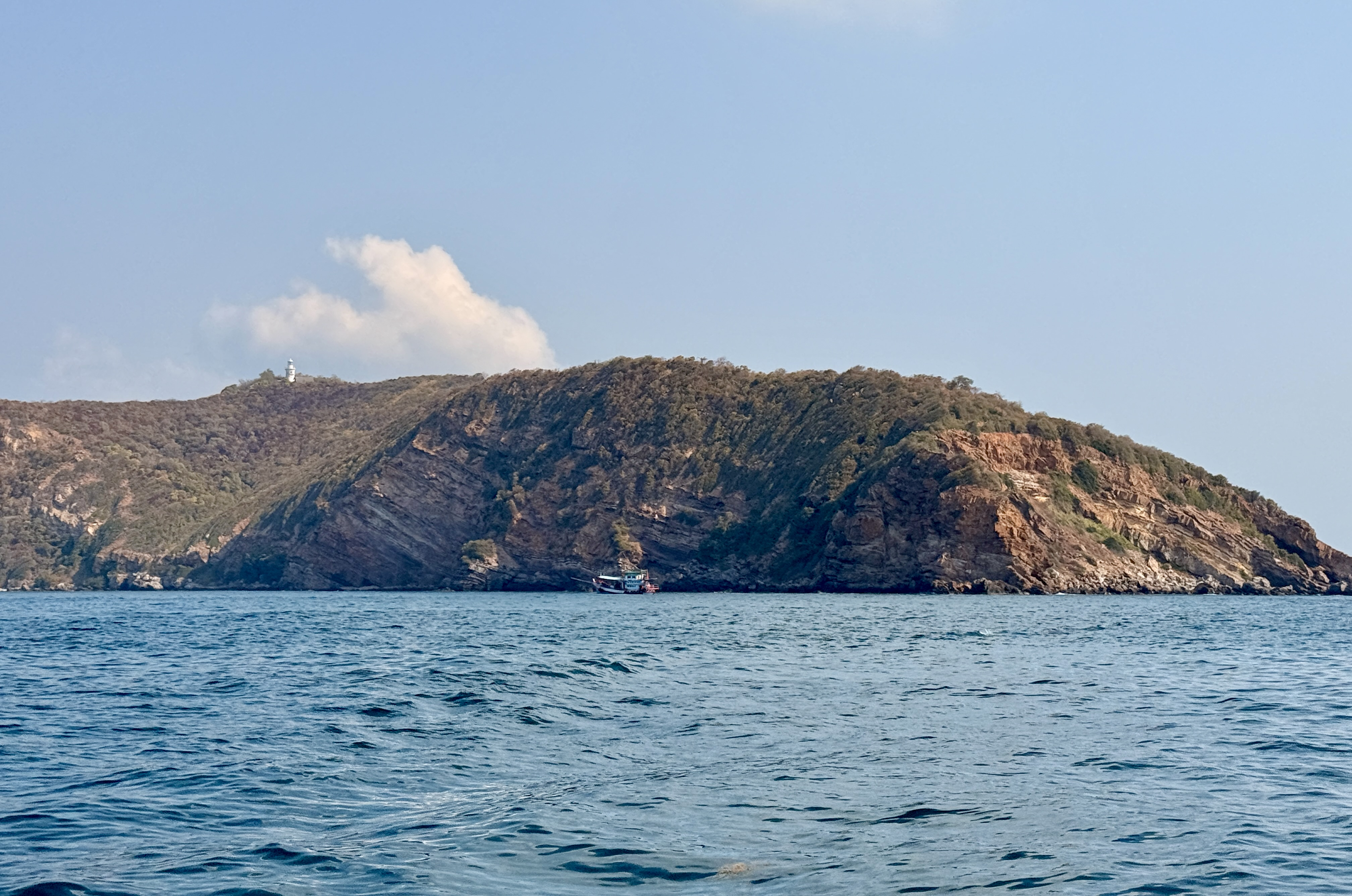
- Narcosis Colosseum. Looking towards Koh Chuang

- Location within Thailand
- Location: Samae San Island, Thailand
- Waterbody: Gulf of Thailand
- Coordinates: 12°30.128′N 100°57.191′E
- Dive type: Technical
- Depth range: 50 m (160 ft)
- Entry type: Boat
- Bottom composition: Sandy Bottom
- Water: Salt
- Nearby sites: Samaesan Hole (100m), Sharkfin Deep Drop (85m), 1/4 Mile Mouthpiece Drop (75m), Thunder Bowl (65m), Koh Rong Nang Training Buoy (50m), Hardeep Wreck (36m)

Narcosis Colosseum is a technical diving site located in the Gulf of Thailand, Samae San Island, in Sattahip District, Chonburi Province. The local vicinity is renowned for its technical diving due to the high concentration of deep and easily accessible dive sites, with PADI referring to it as "Thailand's Hidden Gem for Tec Divers". The area has numerous entries on the List of deepest dive sites in the Gulf of Thailand, with Narcosis Colosseum being recognised as the ninth deepest, with a depth of 50m. It is one of the two holes that lies directly to the south of Koh Chuang that is separated by a ridge at 30m. Out of the two it is the smaller, shallower northern hole, with 1/4 Mile Mouthpiece Drop dive site situated to the south.

== Diving history ==
The first recorded dive of Narcosis Colosseum, was in early 2026 by Technical Dive Instructors Ryland Cairns and Troy Jamieson. The dive site's name originates from the fact it is a steep sided 360° hole, much like a colosseum. With the site bottoming out at 50m it is ideal for Extended Range Tec Dives on air – allowing divers to experience some mild narcosis.

== Diving site hazards ==
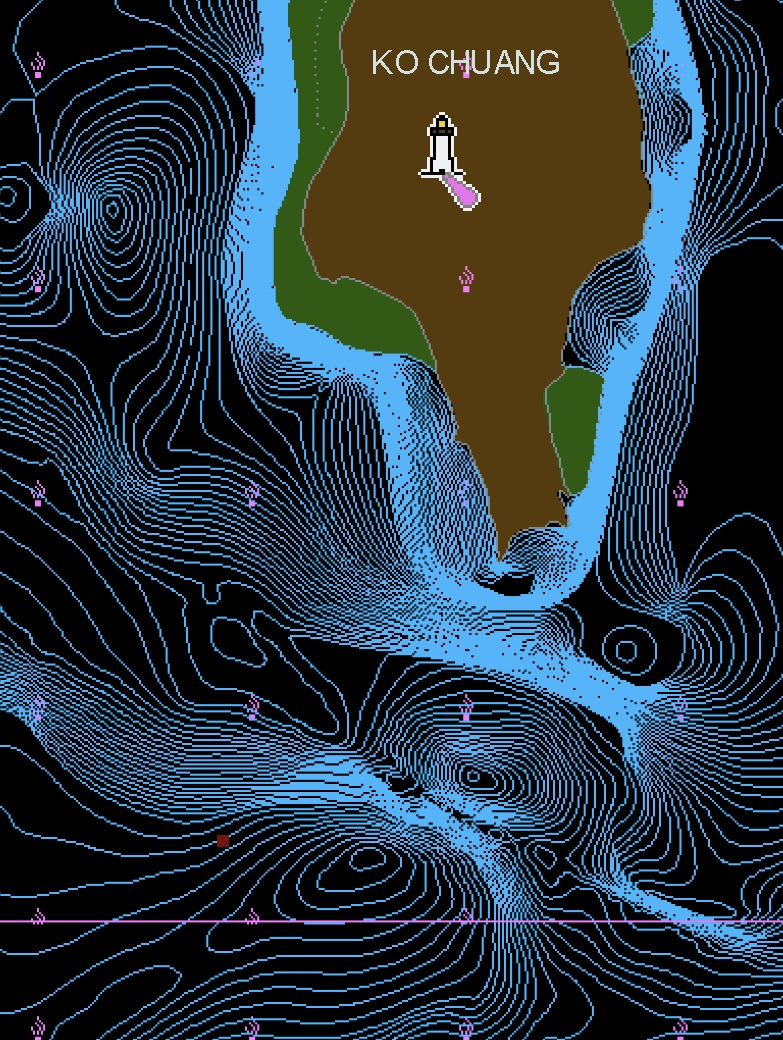
Narcosis Colosseum Sea Charts - First Hole South West of Koh Chuang

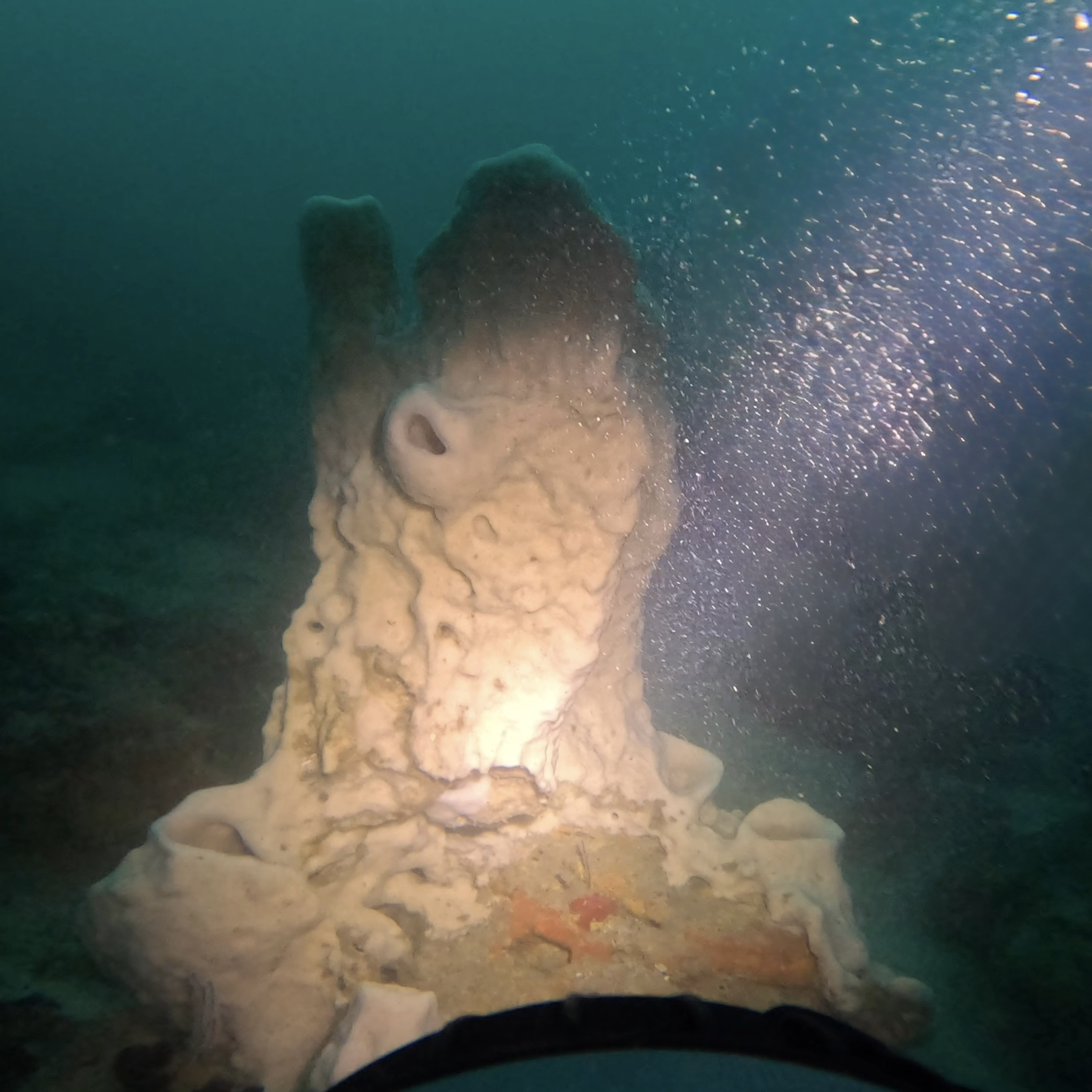
Coral found in low light conditions at the bottom of Narcosis Colosseum

Despite being in close proximity to the Samaesan Hole - which is reported as one of the most extreme dive sites in the world Narcosis Colosseum is recognised as having notably fewer hazards associated with it, including no commercial shipping activities overhead and no unexploded ordnance.

- Depth - Narcosis Colosseum descends down to 50m. On compressed air divers are likely to experience symptoms of narcosis
- Low Visibility - This can reduce down to 5-10m so meticulous dive planning is required.
- Darkness - Light is limited at the bottom, compounding the poor visibility. Torches and back-ups are required.
- Strong & Unpredictable Currents - This is caused by a large tidal range and underlying topology. With divers being reported as being swept 2 km from the dive site. Down currents are also a common occurrence. It is advised to dive this site in slack tide and have robust surface support to prevent being swept out to sea.
