= List of deepest dive sites in the Gulf of Thailand =

The Gulf of Thailand, historically known as the Gulf of Siam, is a shallow inlet adjacent to the southwestern South China Sea, bounded between the southwestern shores of Mainland Southeast Asia and the northern half of the Malay Peninsula. The gulf's many coral reefs have made it attractive to divers visiting Thailand.

The highest concentration of deep technical dive sites is in the Samae San Island area. It offers a range of the deepest technical dives in the Gulf of Thailand that are also easily accessible. A number of deep wreck dives are present in the Gulf of Thailand however these require extended boat trips and extra safety and logistical considerations. Koh Tao offers two easily accessible tec diving sites however these have much shallower depth compared to other tec diving locations in the Gulf of Thailand

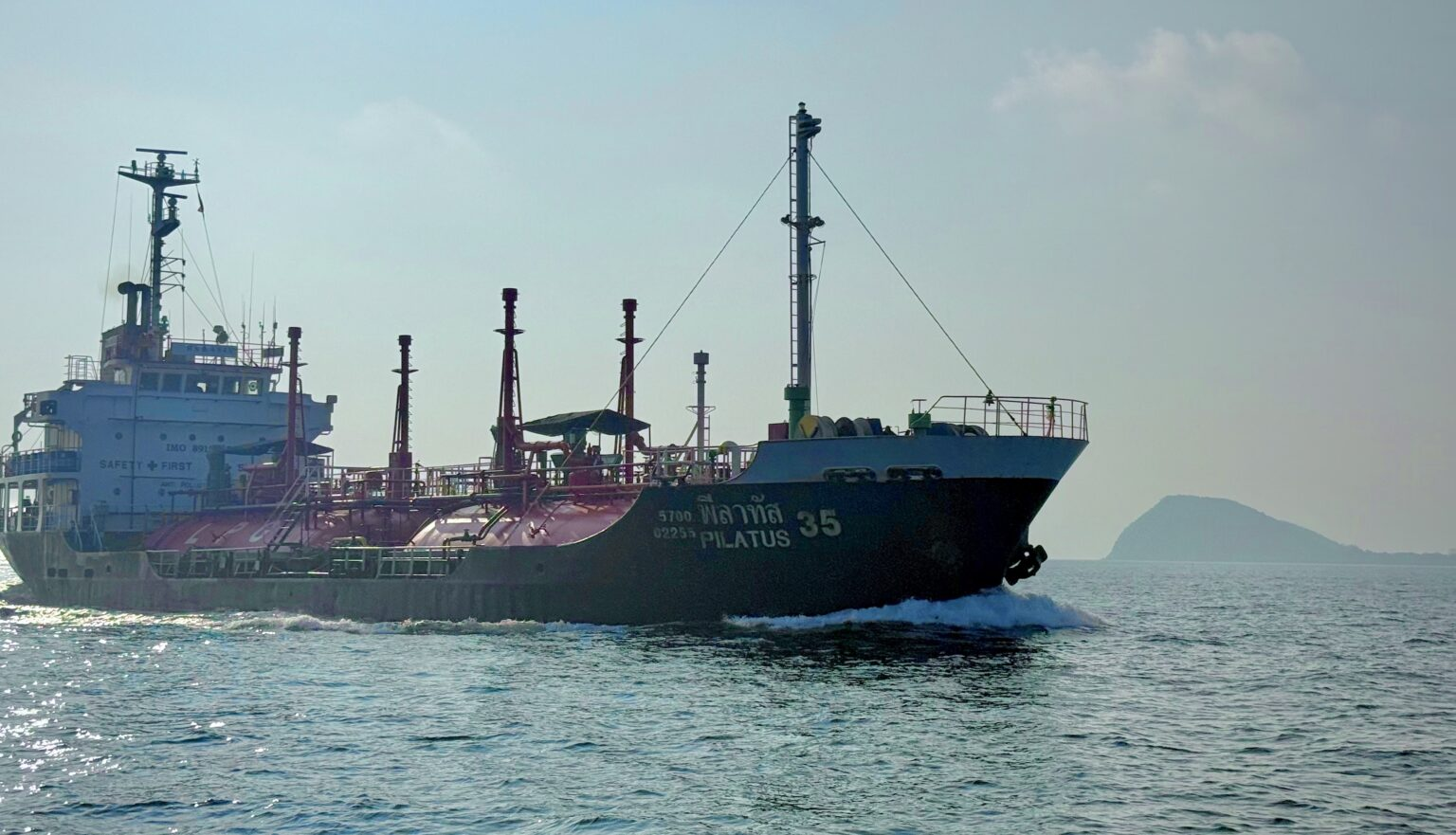
Samaesan Hole - Commercial Shipping Lane

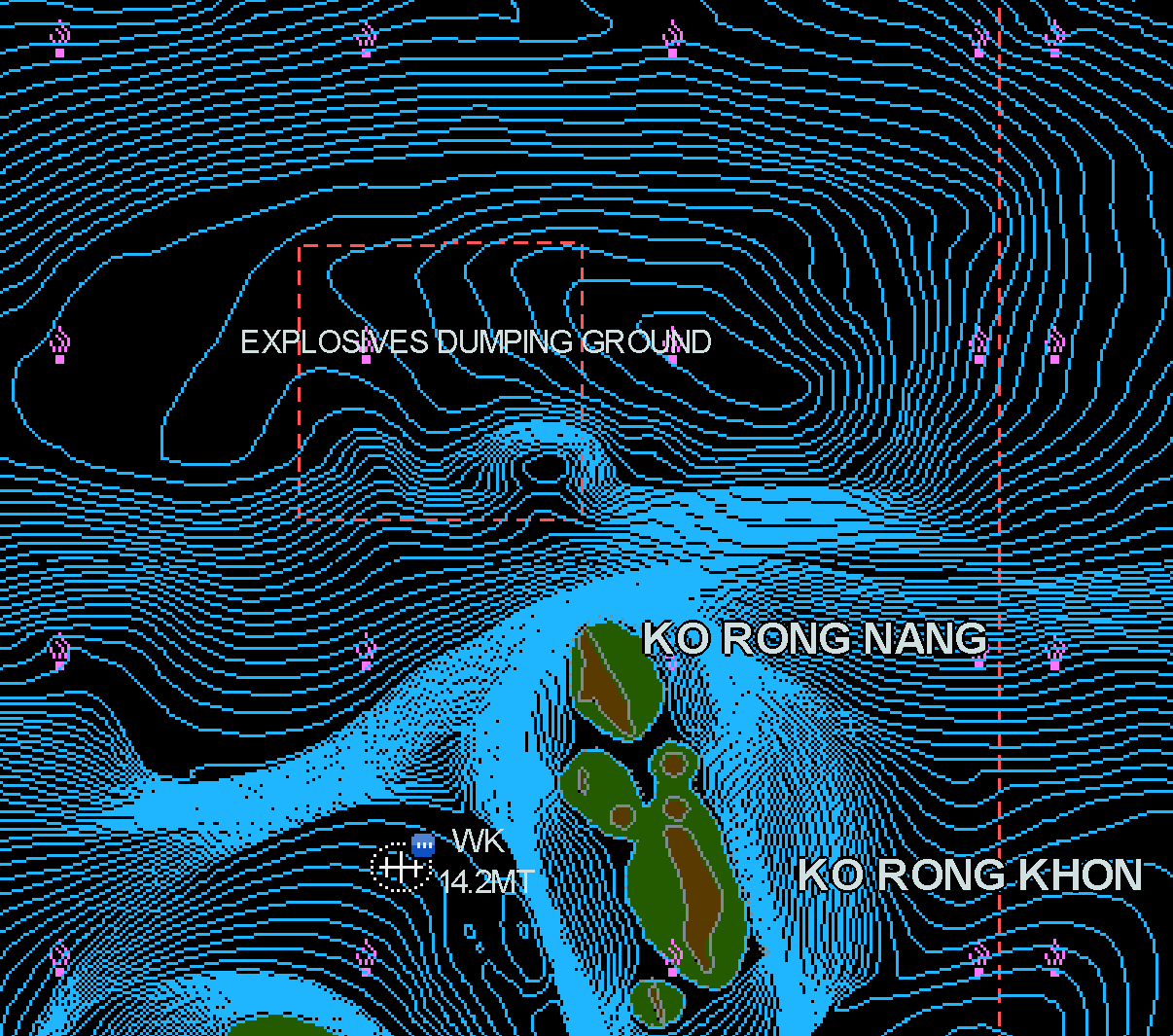
Samaesan Hole Map - Explosives Dumping Ground

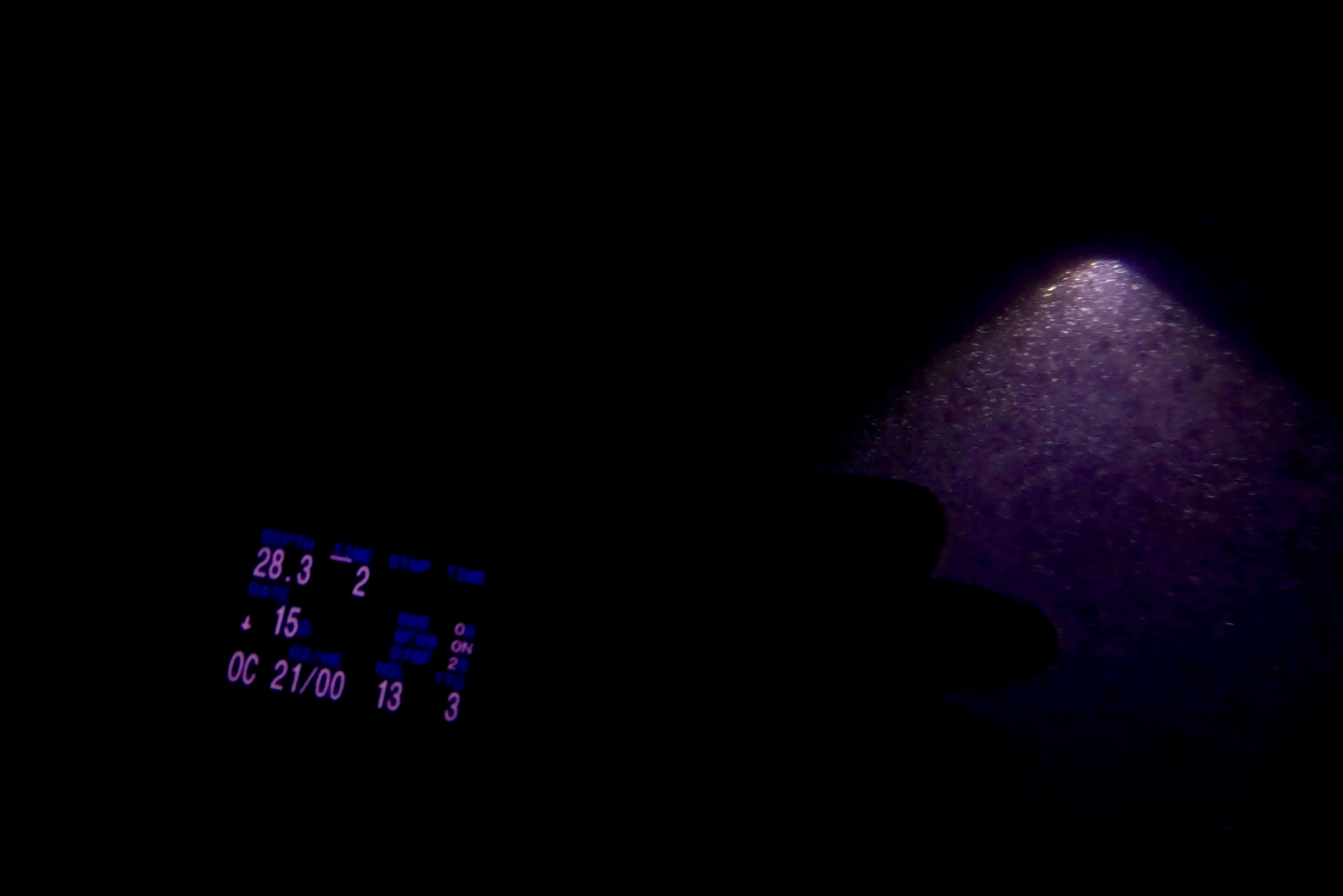
Sharkfin Deep Drop - Darkness at 28m

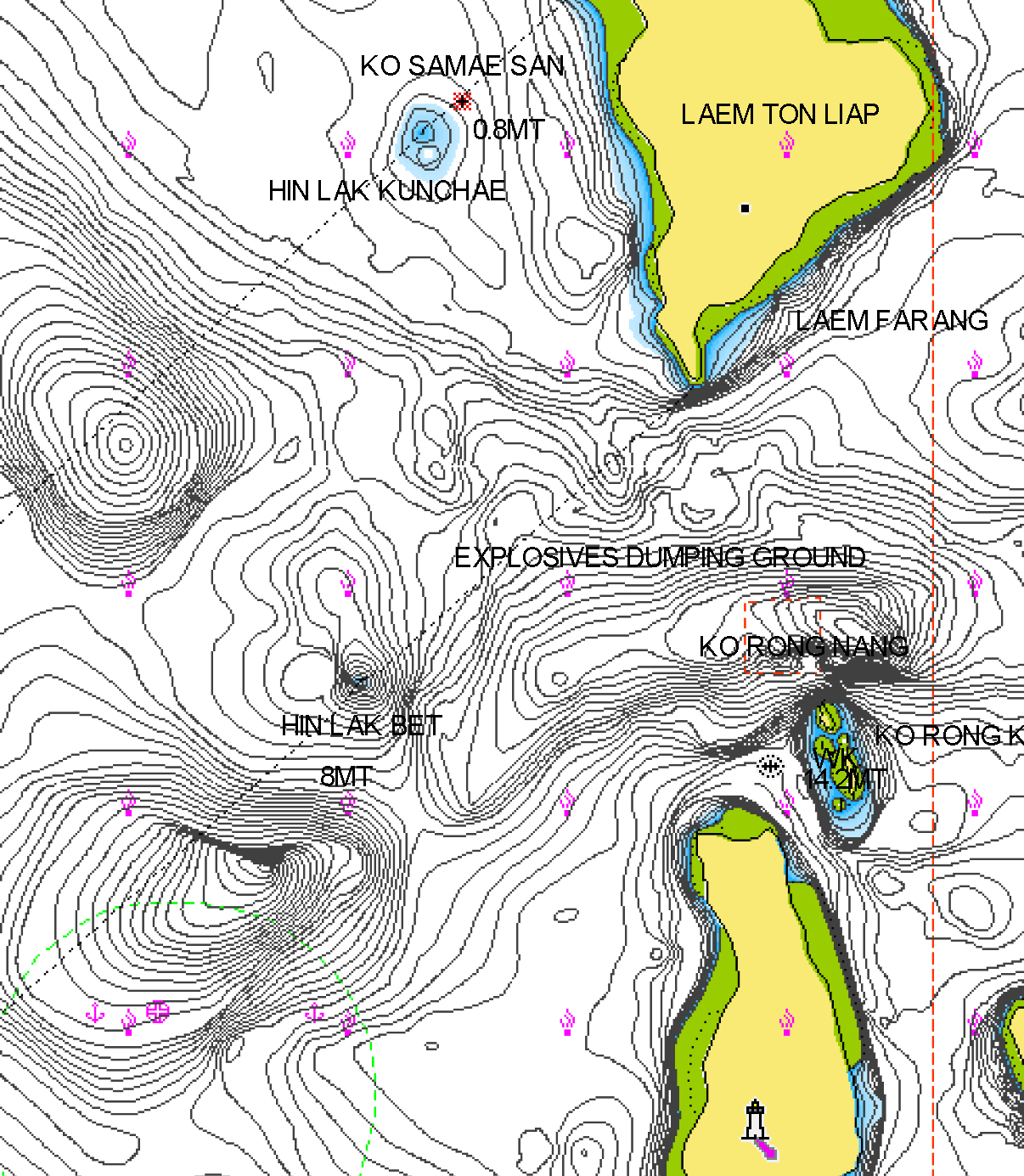
Koh Samaesan Sea Charts

Name	Max. depth	Coordinates	Location	Type of Dive
Samaesan Hole	100–85 m (328–279 ft)	12°32.314′N 100°57.616′E	Samae San Island	Open ocean
Sharkfin Deep Drop / Samaesan Cliff	85–50 m (279–164 ft)	12°31.705′N 100°56.020′E	Samae San Island	Open ocean / Wall
1/4 Mile Mouthpiece Drop	75 m (246 ft)	12°30.094′N 100°57.233′E	Samae San Island	Open ocean
Tattori Maru	75 m (246 ft)	9°58.00′N 101°05.00′E	120 nmi (220 km; 140 mi) east of Koh Tao	Wreck
Drillship Seacrest	73 m (240 ft)	08°3.806′N 101°39.433′E	170 nmi (310 km; 200 mi) northeast of Songkhla	Wreck
USS Lagarto	70 m (230 ft)	7°55′N 102°18′E	Ko Losin	Wreck
Thunder Bowl	65 m (213 ft)	12°32.807′N 100°55.655′E	Samae San Island	Open ocean
HTMS Pangan	65 m (213 ft)	No record	60 nmi (110 km; 69 mi) northeast of Koh Tao	Wreck
Narcosis Colosseum	50 m (160 ft)	12°30.128′N 100°57.191′E	Samae San Island	Open ocean
Koh Rong Nang Training Buoy	50–37 m (164–121 ft)	12°32.968′N 100°57.298′E	Samae San Island	Reef
HTMS Sarasin	43 m (141 ft)	No record	Pattaya	Wreck
PAK 1/Koho Maru-5	43 m (141 ft)	12°05.504′N 101°40.931′E	Koh Chang	Wreck
Chumphon Pinnacle	40 m (130 ft)	10°10.350′N 99°46.722′E	Koh Tao	Reef
Sail Rock/Hin Bai	40 m (130 ft)	9°55.615′N 99°58.618′E	Koh Tao	Reef
