= 1/4 Mile Mouthpiece Drop =

Technical Dive Site in Thailand

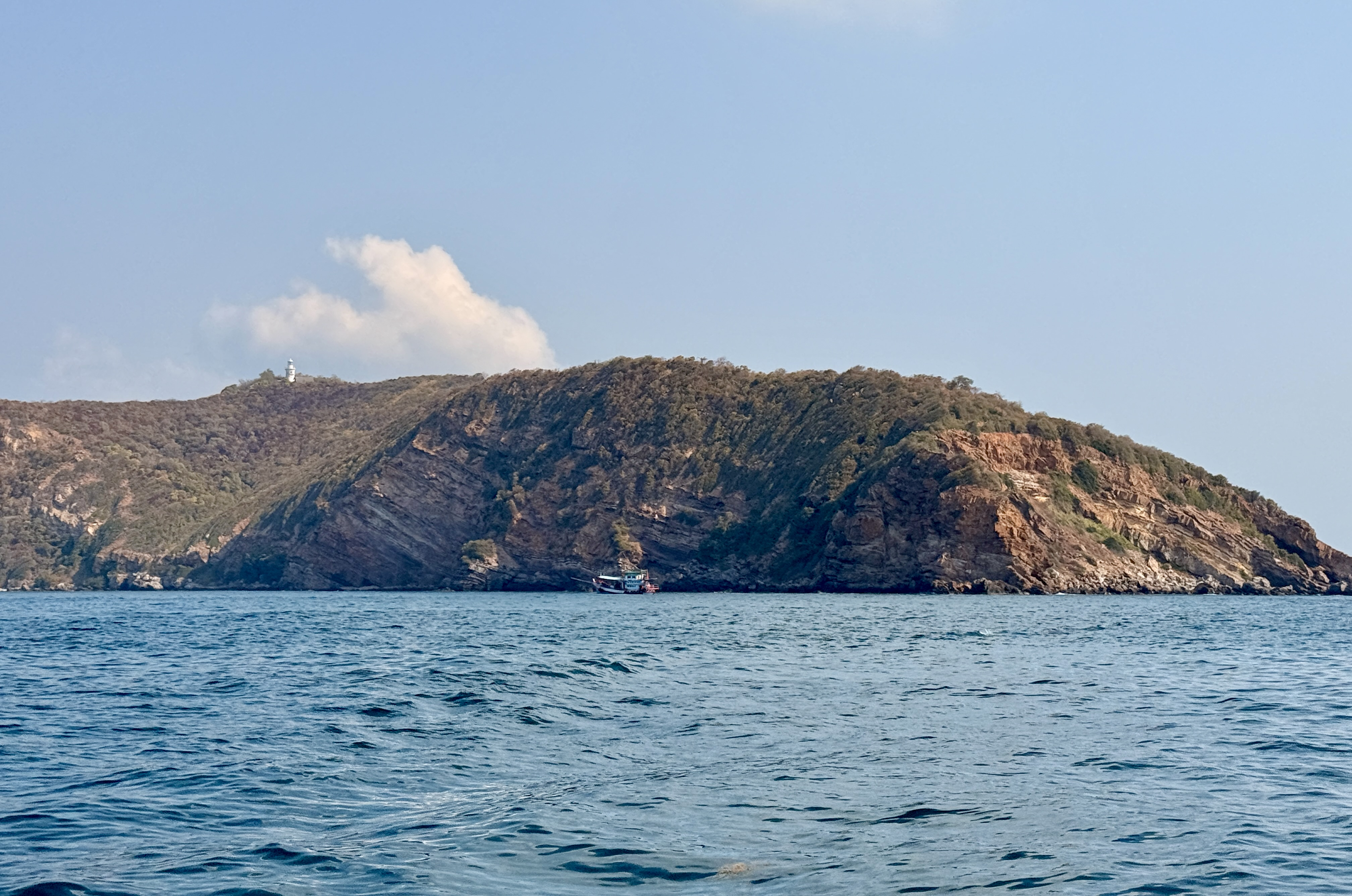
- 1/4 Mile Mouthpiece Drop from the surface. Looking towards Koh Chuang.

- Location within Thailand
- Location: Samae San Island, Thailand
- Waterbody: Gulf of Thailand
- Coordinates: 12°30.094′N 100°57.233′E
- Dive type: Technical
- Depth range: 75 m (246 ft)
- Entry type: Boat
- Bottom composition: Sandy Bottom
- Water: Salt
- Nearby sites: Samaesan Hole (100m), Sharkfin Deep Drop (85m), Thunder Bowl (65m), Narcosis Colosseum (50m), Koh Rong Nang Training Buoy (50m), Hardeep Wreck (36m)

1/4 Mile Mouthpiece Drop is a technical diving site located in the Gulf of Thailand, Samae San Island, in Sattahip District, Chonburi Province. The vicinity is renowned for its technical diving due to the high concentration of deep and easily accessible dive sites, with PADI referring to it as "Thailand's Hidden Gem for Tec Divers". The area has numerous entries on the List of deepest dive sites in the Gulf of Thailand, with 1/4 Mile Mouthpiece Drop being recognised as the third deepest, with a depth of 75m. It is one of the two holes that lie directly to the south of Koh Chuang and are separated by a ridge at 30m. It is the larger of the two, deep southern hole, with Narcosis Colosseum dive site situated to the north. The site is recognised as having better visibility that other deep technical dive sites in the vicinity, with rocky outcrops and barrel coral.

== Diving history ==
The first recorded dive of 1/4 Mile Mouthpiece Drop, was in early 2026 by Technical Dive Instructors Ryland Cairns and Troy Jamieson. The name of the dive site came from the pair drag racing their Diver propulsion vehicles along the sea floor during which time a regulator mouthpiece detached mid-dive. The full dive site name thus makes reference to a 1/4 Mile dragstrip as well as the a dropped mouthpiece. The site was also reported to have claimed two more mouthpieces - still attached to their regulators and deco cylinders.

== Diving site hazards ==
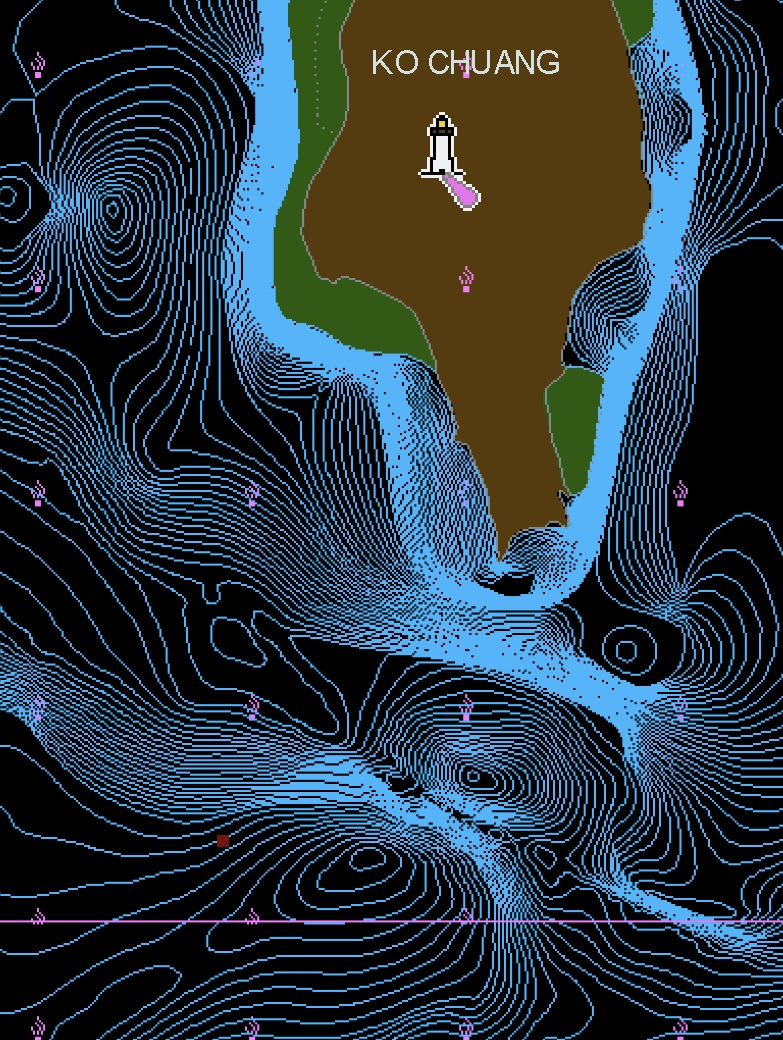
1/4 Mile Mouthpiece Drop Sea Charts - second hole west of Koh Chuang

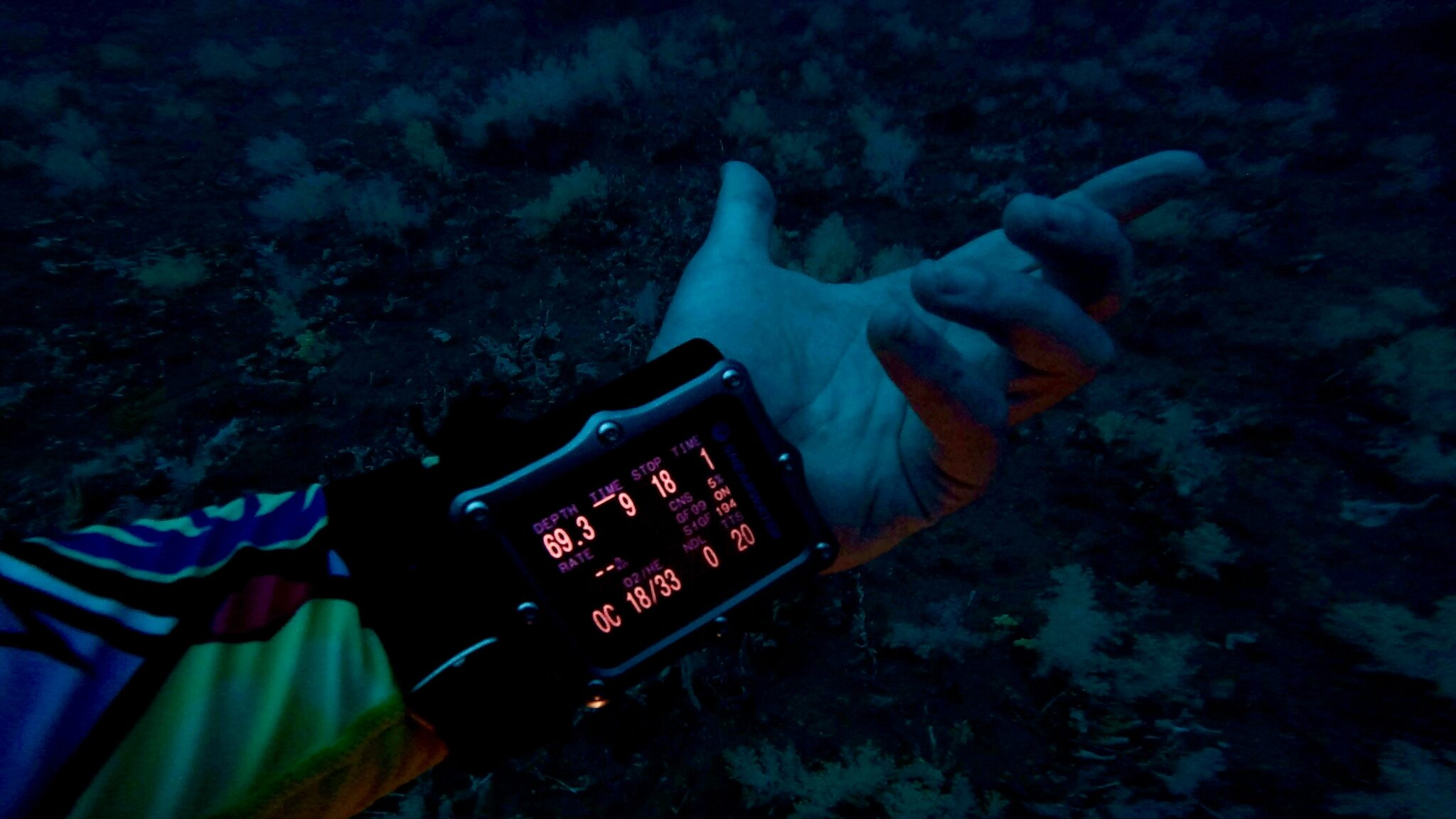
1/4 Mile Mouth Piece Drop Dive Site: natural light at 70m

Despite its nearness to the Samaesan Hole, which is reported as one of the most extreme dive sites in the world, 1/4 Mile Mouthpiece Drop is recognised as having notably fewer hazards associated with it, including no commercial shipping activities overhead and no unexploded ordnance. 1/4 Mile Mouthpiece Drop descends to 75m, so air should not be used. Diver should use hypoxic trimix to prevent nitrogen narcosis and CNS Toxicity. Strong and unpredictable currents are caused by a large tidal range and underlying topology. With divers being reported as being swept 2km from the dive site. Down currents are common. It is advised to dive this site in slack tide and have robust surface support to prevent being swept out to sea.
