= Thunder Bowl =

Technical Dive Site in Thailand

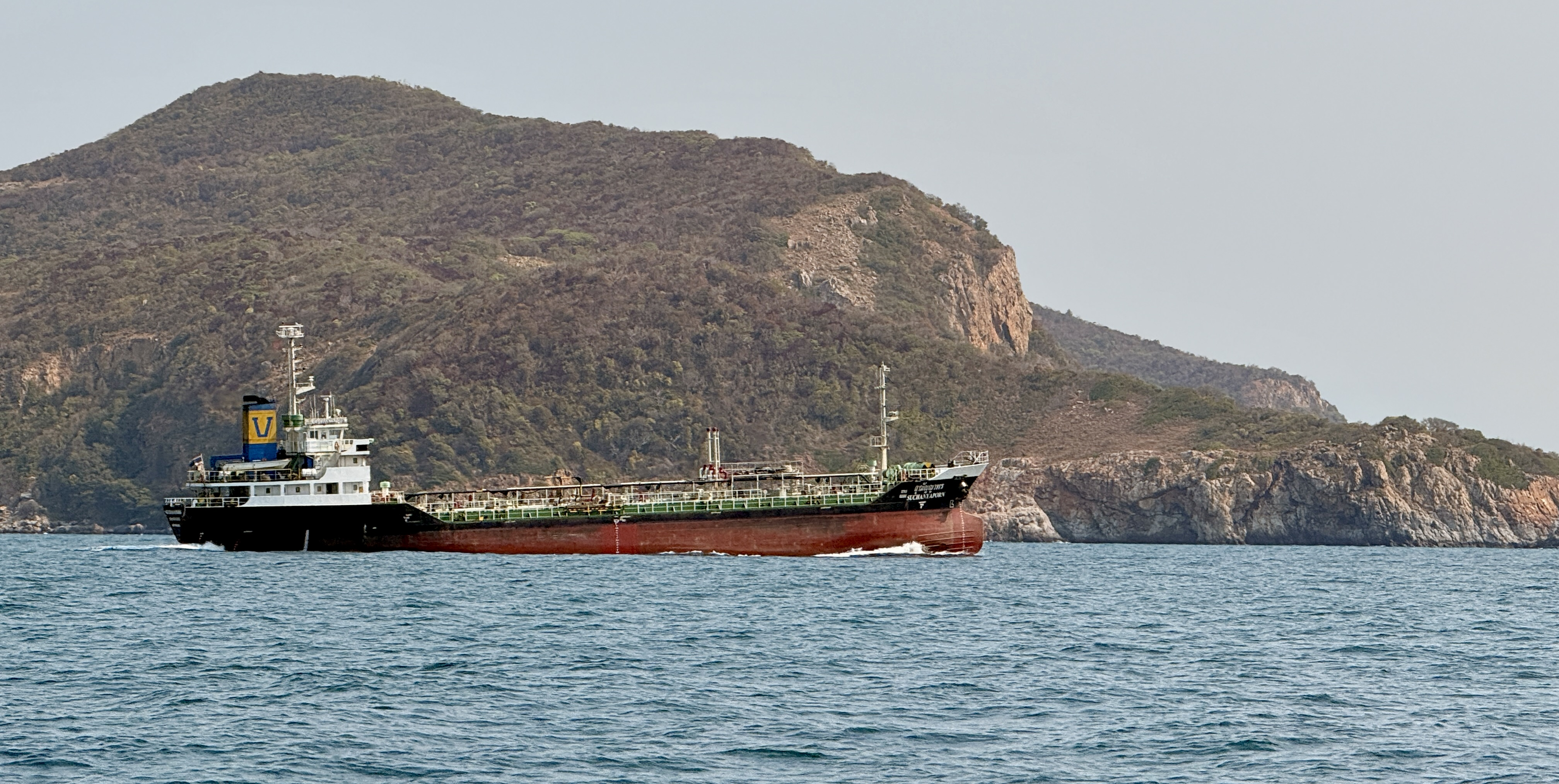
- Thunder Bowl from the surface. Looking towards Samae San Island with ship passing overhead

- Location within Thailand
- Location: Samae San Island, Thailand
- Waterbody: Gulf of Thailand
- Coordinates: 12°32.807′N 100°55.655′E
- Dive type: Technical
- Depth range: 65 m (213 ft)
- Entry type: Boat
- Bottom composition: Sandy Bottom
- Water: Salt
- Nearby sites: Samaesan Hole (100m), Sharkfin Deep Drop (85m), 1/4 Mile Mouthpiece Drop (75m), Narcosis Colosseum (50m), Koh Rong Nang Training Buoy (50m), Hardeep Wreck (36m)

Thunder Bowl is a technical diving site located in the Gulf of Thailand, Samae San Island, in Sattahip District, Chonburi Province. The vicinity is renowned for its technical diving due to the high concentration of deep and easily accessible dive sites, with PADI referring to it as "Thailand's Hidden Gem for Tec Divers". The area has numerous entries on the List of deepest dive sites in the Gulf of Thailand, with Thunder Bowl being recognised as the seventh deepest, with a depth of 65m. It lies in a major shipping lane to the west of the southern most tip of Koh Samaesan. The site has a sandy bottom containing soft corals and barrel corals. Despite being in close proximity to the Samaesan Hole, conditions tend to be milder. This makes it an ideal training site for Trimix Divers.

== Diving history ==
The first recorded dive of Thunder Bowl, was in early 2026 by Technical Dive Instructors Ryland Cairns and Troy Jamieson. The dive site’s name comes from the bowl shape topography of the site combined with the thunder caused by the commercial ships passing overhead.

== Diving site hazards ==
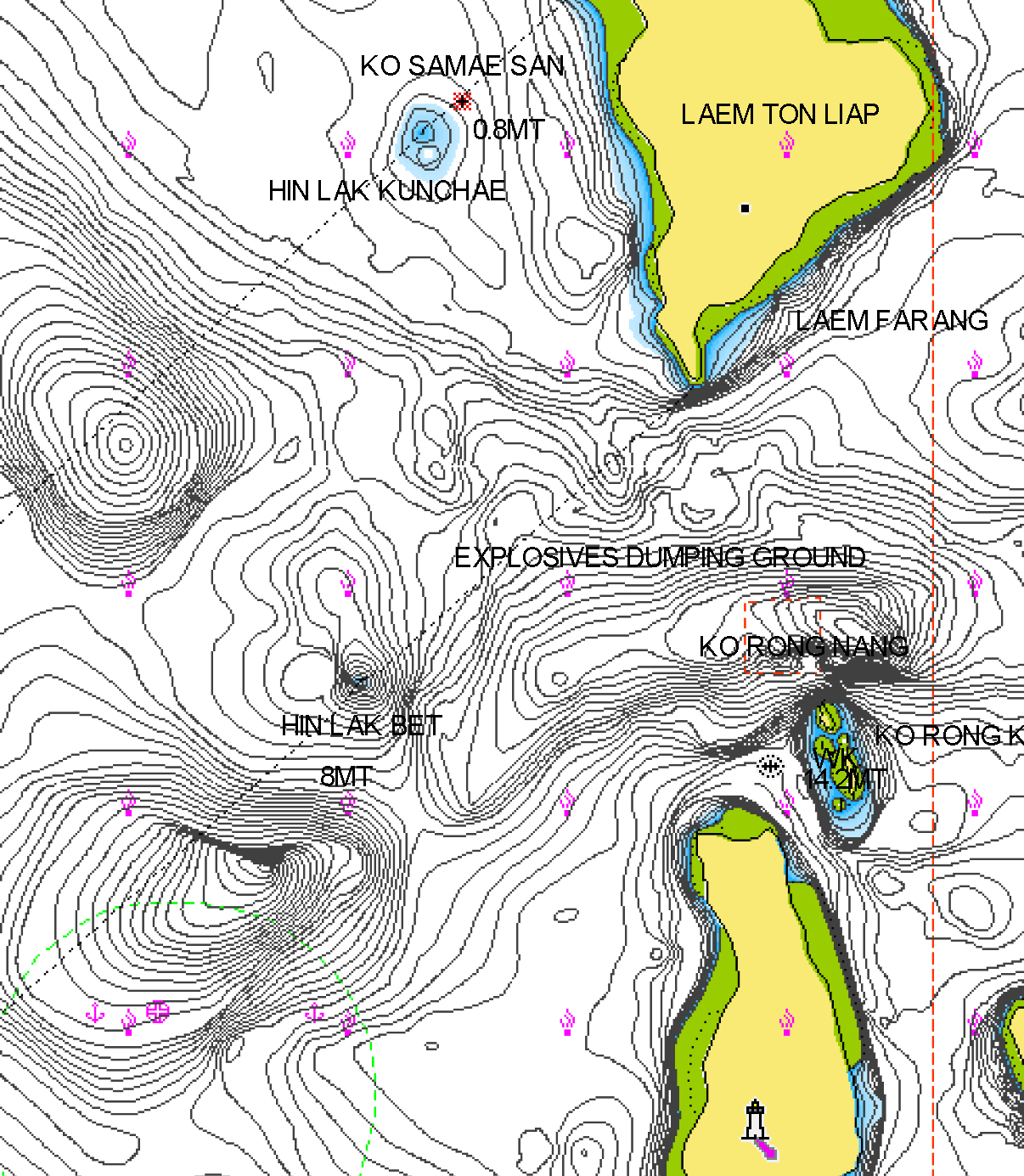
Thunder Bowl Sea Charts - West of the Southern most tip of Koh Samaesan

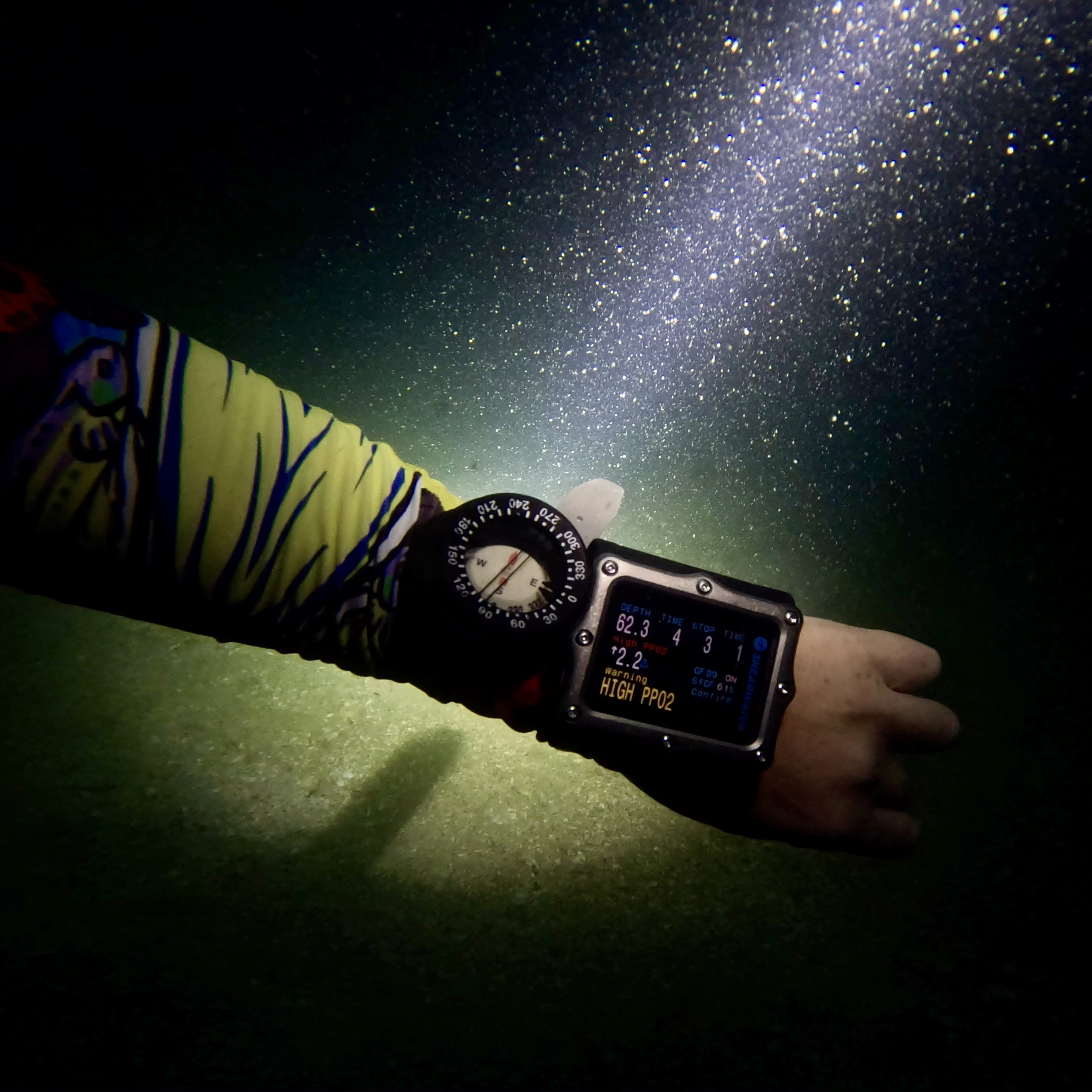
Approaching the bottom of Thunder Bowl

Despite its close proximity to the Samaesan Hole, which is reported as one of the most extreme dive sites in the world, Thunder Bowl is recognised as having notably fewer hazards associated with it, including no unexploded ordnance. Thunder Bowl descends to 65m, so air is not advised. Diver should consider the use of trimix to prevent nitrogen narcosis and CNS Toxicity. Strong currents are caused by a large tidal range, whilst poor visibility and darkness are common. As dive site is in the middle of a commercial shipping lane so strong surface support is required .
