= Sharkfin Deep Drop =

Technical Dive Site in Thailand

Sharkfin Deep Drop (Also known as the Samaesan Cliff)
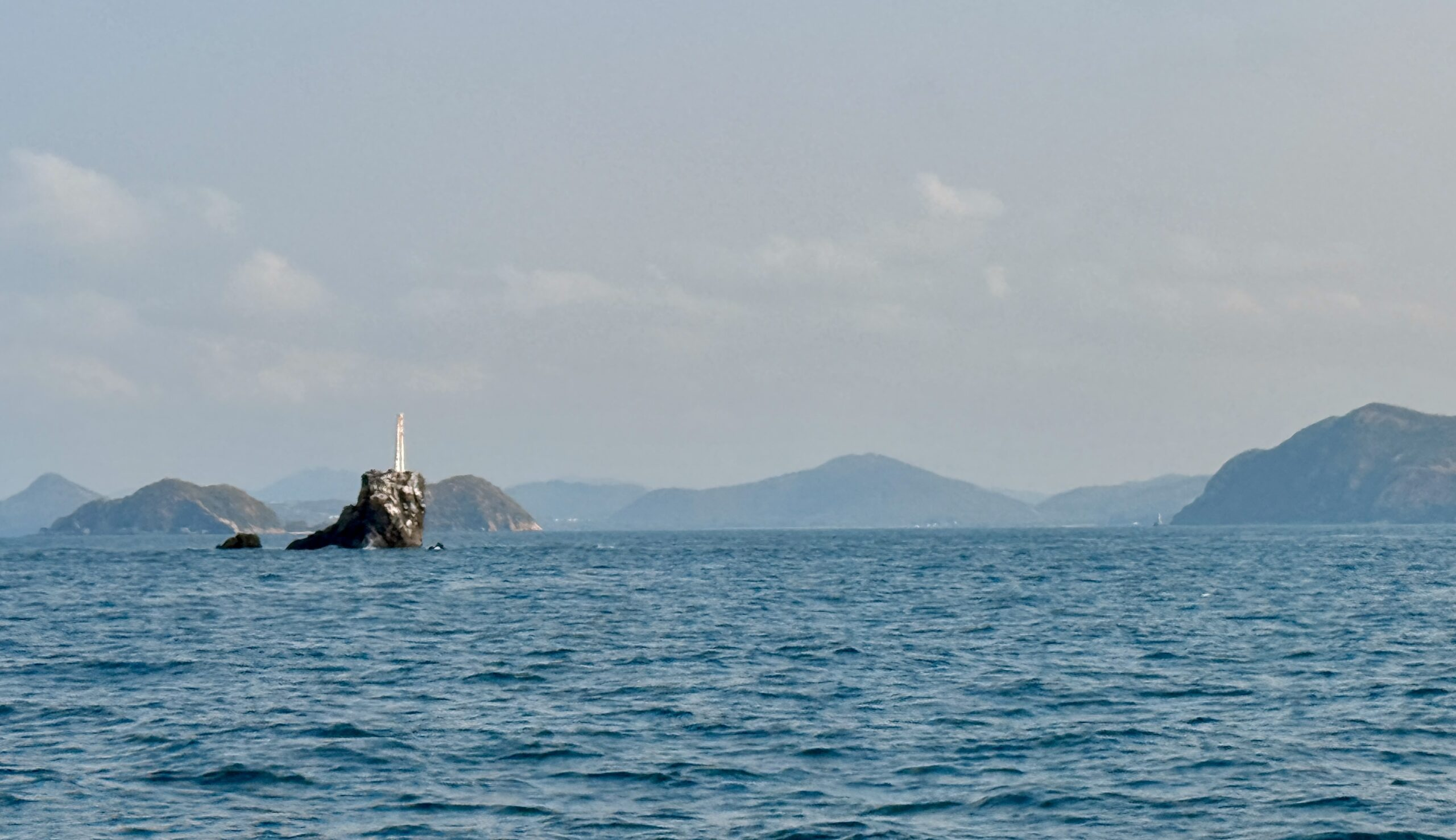
- Sharkfin Deep Drop from the surface. Looking towards Hin Lak Bat.

- Location within Thailand
- Location: Samae San Island, Thailand
- Waterbody: Gulf of Thailand
- Coordinates: 12°31.705′N 100°56.020′E
- Dive type: Technical
- Depth range: 85 to 86 m (279 to 282 ft)
- Entry type: Boat
- Bottom composition: Sandy Bottom
- Water: Salt
- Nearby sites: Samaesan Hole (100m), 1/4 Mile Mouthpiece Drop (75m), Thunder Bowl (65m), Narcosis Colosseum (50m), Koh Rong Nang Training Buoy (50m), Hardeep Wreck (36m)

Sharkfin Deep Drop is a technical diving site located in the Gulf of Thailand, Samae San Island, in Sattahip District, Chonburi Province. The local vicinity is renowned for its technical diving due to the high concentration of deep and easily accessible dive sites, with PADI referring to it as "Thailand's Hidden Gem for Tec Divers". The area has numerous entries on the List of deepest dive sites in the Gulf of Thailand, with Sharkfin Deep Drop being recognised as the second deepest, with a depth of 85m to 86m depending on reference. The origin of the dive site's name comes from its proximity to Sharkfin Rock (Hin Lak Bet) on local sea charts, combined with the steep overhanging wall starting at roughly 50m. The site is sometimes also referred to as the Samaesan Cliff. Compared to other deep technical dive sites in the local vicinity, this site is recognised as having a greater abundance of marine species.

== Diving History ==
The first recorded dive of Sharkfin Deep Drop occurred in 1998 by technical diver Steve Burton.

== Diving Site Hazards ==
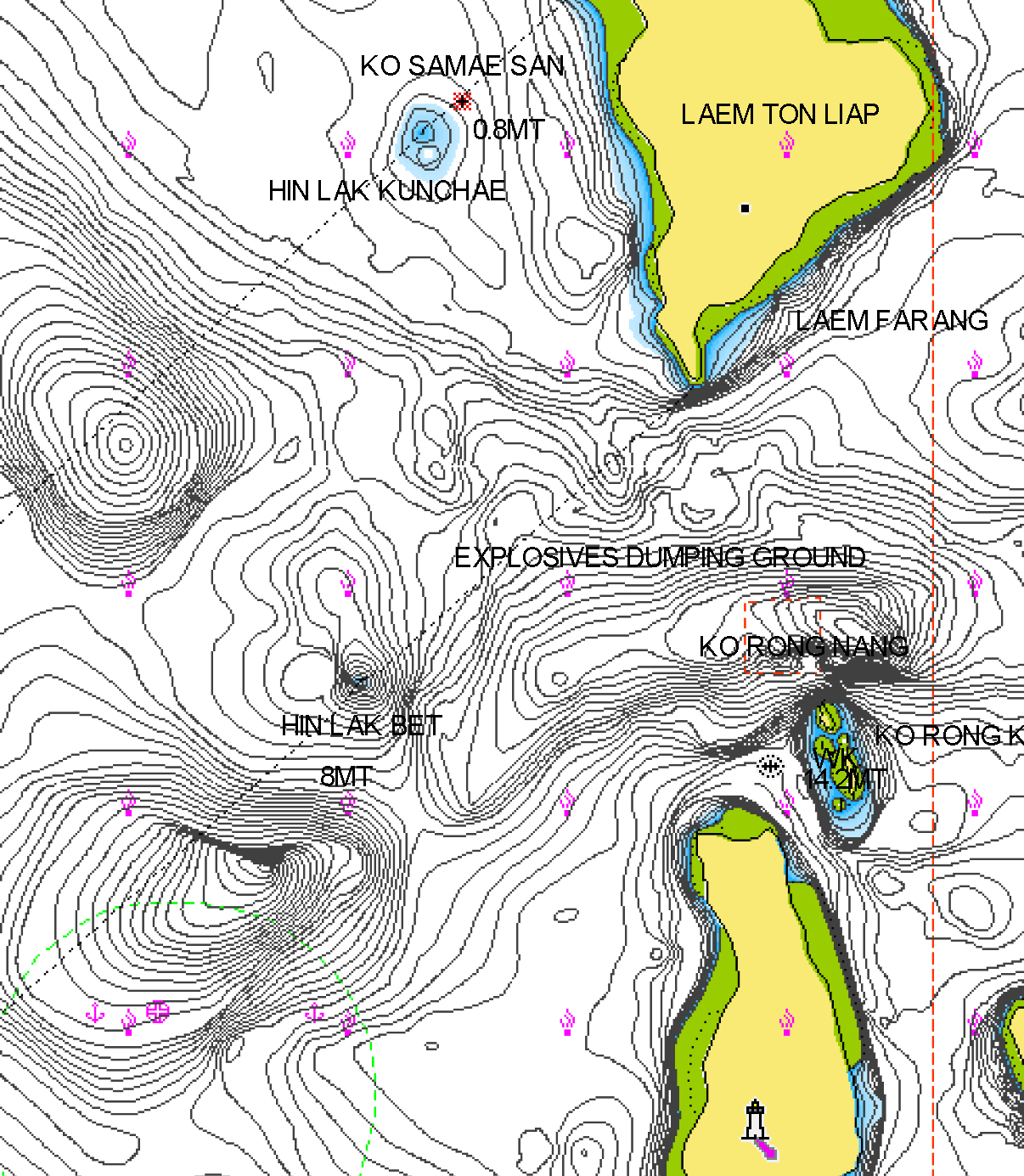
Sharkfin Deep Drop Sea Charts - South West of Hin Lak Bat

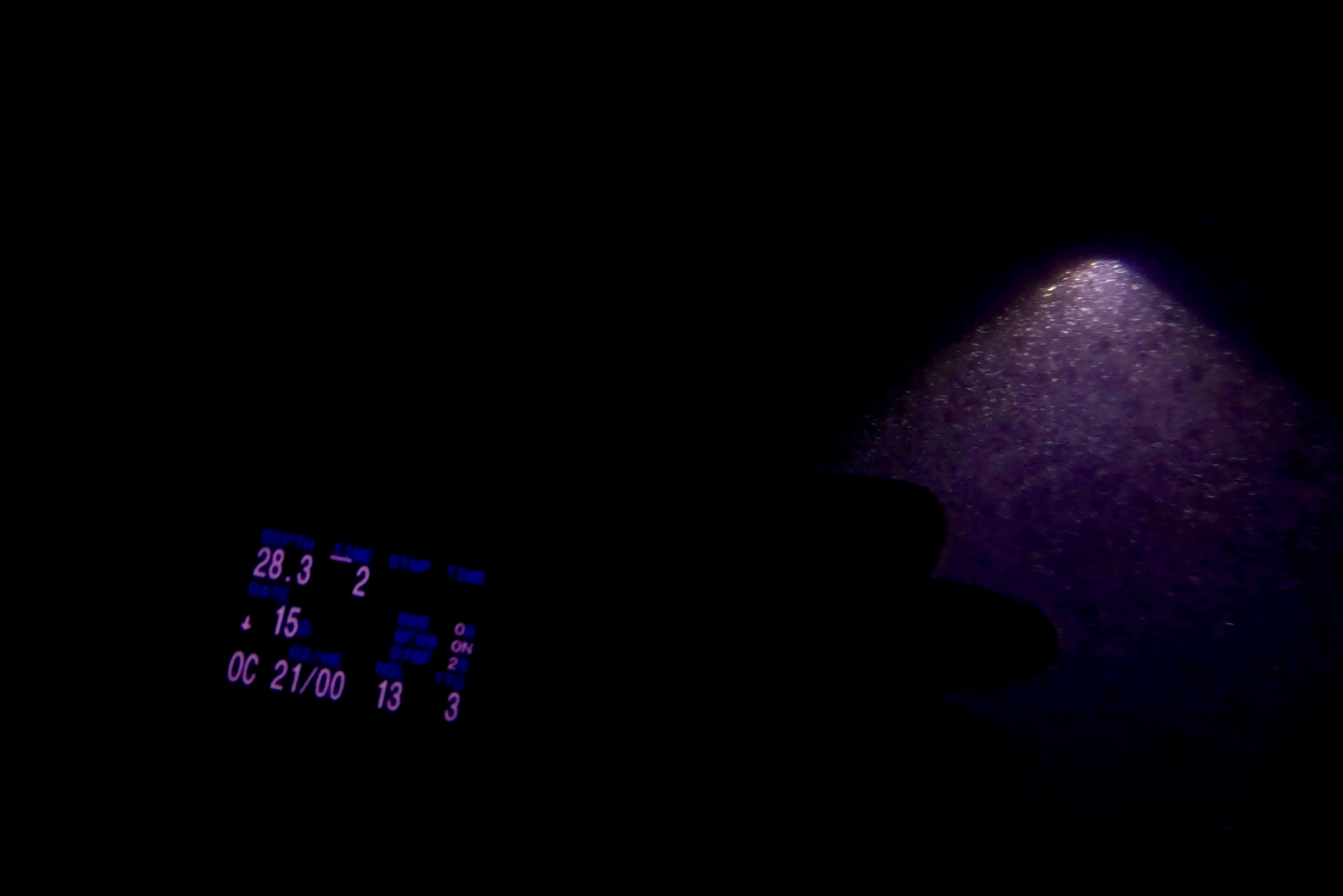
Sharkfin Deep Drop - example of extreme darkness at 28m at 1100am 23rd April 26

Despite being in close proximity to the Samaesan Hole - which is reported as one of the most extreme dive sites in the world Sharkfin Deep Drop is recognised as having notably fewer hazards associated with it, including no commercial shipping activities overhead and no unexploded ordnance.

- Depth - Sharkfin Deep Drop descends down to 86m, as such, air should not be used. Diver should use hypoxic trimix to prevent nitrogen narcosis and CNS Toxicity.
- Strong Currents - This is caused by a large tidal range. It is advised to dive this site in slack tide and have robust surface support to prevent being swept out to sea.
- Low Visibility - This can reduce down to 5-10m so meticulous dive planning is required.
- Darkness - Below 50m there is no light, compounding the poor visibility. Torches and back-ups are required.
