= Samaesan Hole =

Technical Dive Site in Thailand

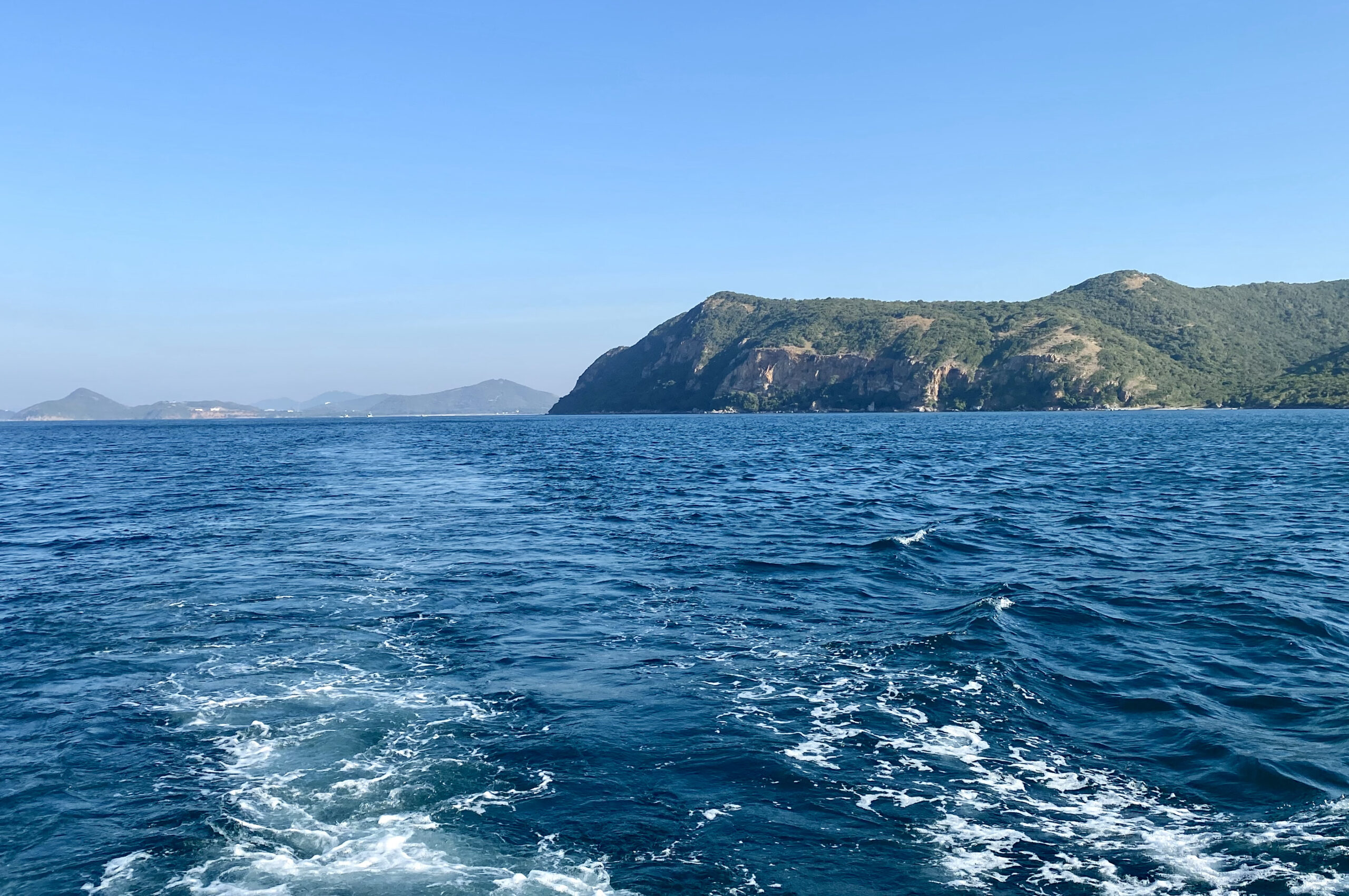
- View of Samaesan Hole from the surface. Looking towards the southern tip of Koh Samaesan island.

- Location within Thailand
- Location: Samae San Island, Thailand
- Waterbody: Gulf of Thailand
- Coordinates: 12°32.314′N 100°57.616′E
- Dive type: Technical
- Depth range: 85 to 100 m (279 to 328 ft)
- Entry type: Boat
- Bottom composition: Sandy Bottom
- Water: Salt
- Nearby sites: Sharkfin Deep Drop (85m), 1/4 Mile Mouthpiece Drop (72m), Thunder Bowl (65m), Narcosis Colosseum (50m), Koh Rong Nang Training Buoy (37m-50m), Hardeep Wreck (36m)

The Samaesan Hole is a technical diving site is located in the Gulf of Thailand, Samae San Island, in Sattahip District, Chonburi Province. The local vicinity is renowned for its technical diving due to the high concentration of deep and easily accessible dive sites, with PADI referring to it as "Thailand's Hidden Gem for Tec Divers". The area has numerous entries on the List of deepest dive sites in the Gulf of Thailand, with the deepest being the Samaesan Hole, with a recorded depth of 85m to 100m. The dive site lies in the vicinity of the shipping lanes between Koh Rong Nang and Koh Samaesan by the area named Explosives Dumping Ground on local sea charts.

== Diving History ==
The first successful recorded descent to the bottom of the Samaesan Hole occurred in 1998 by technical divers Steve Burton and Claes Martinsson.

== Diving Site Hazards ==
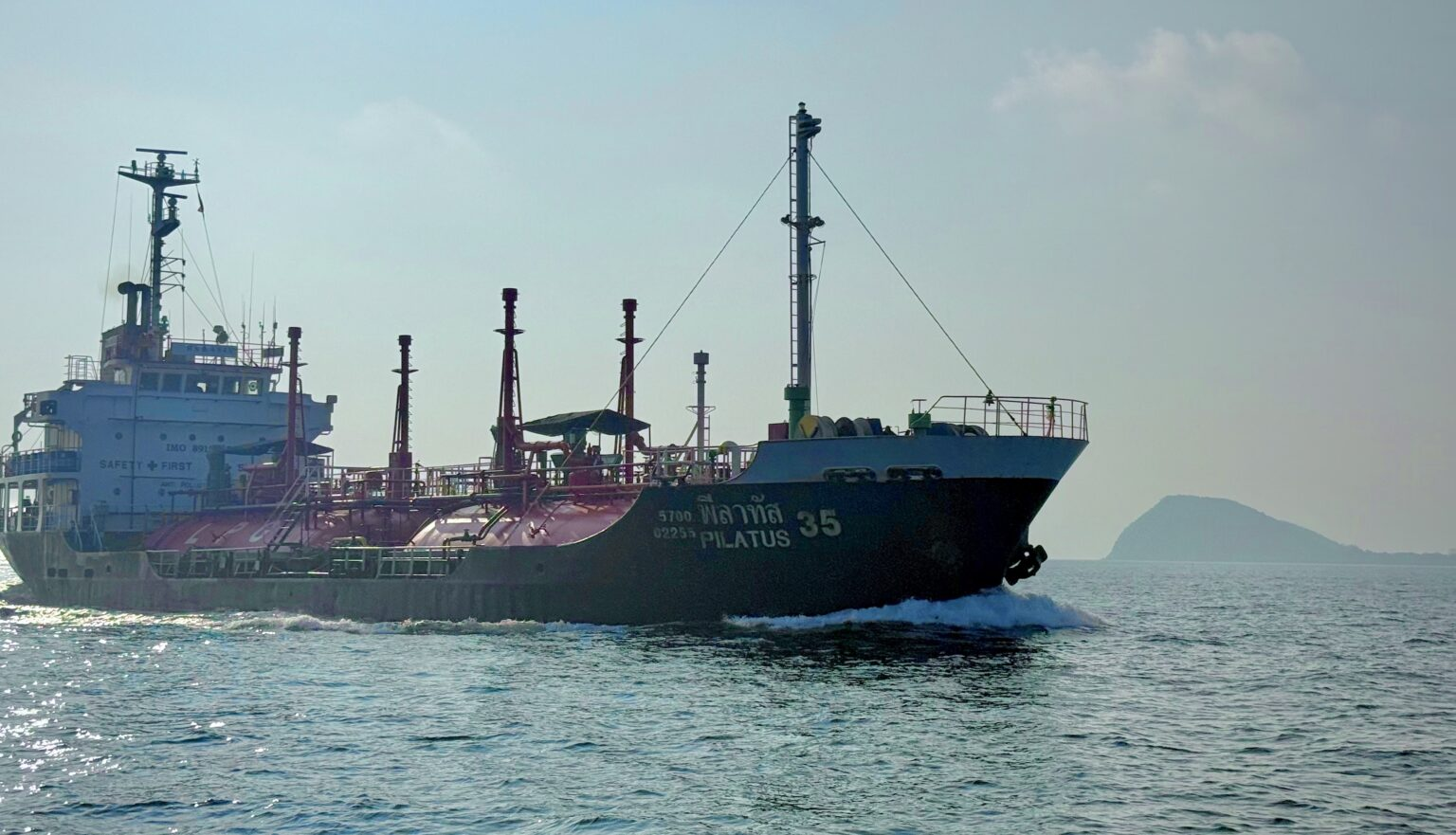
Samaesan Hole - Commercial Shipping Lane

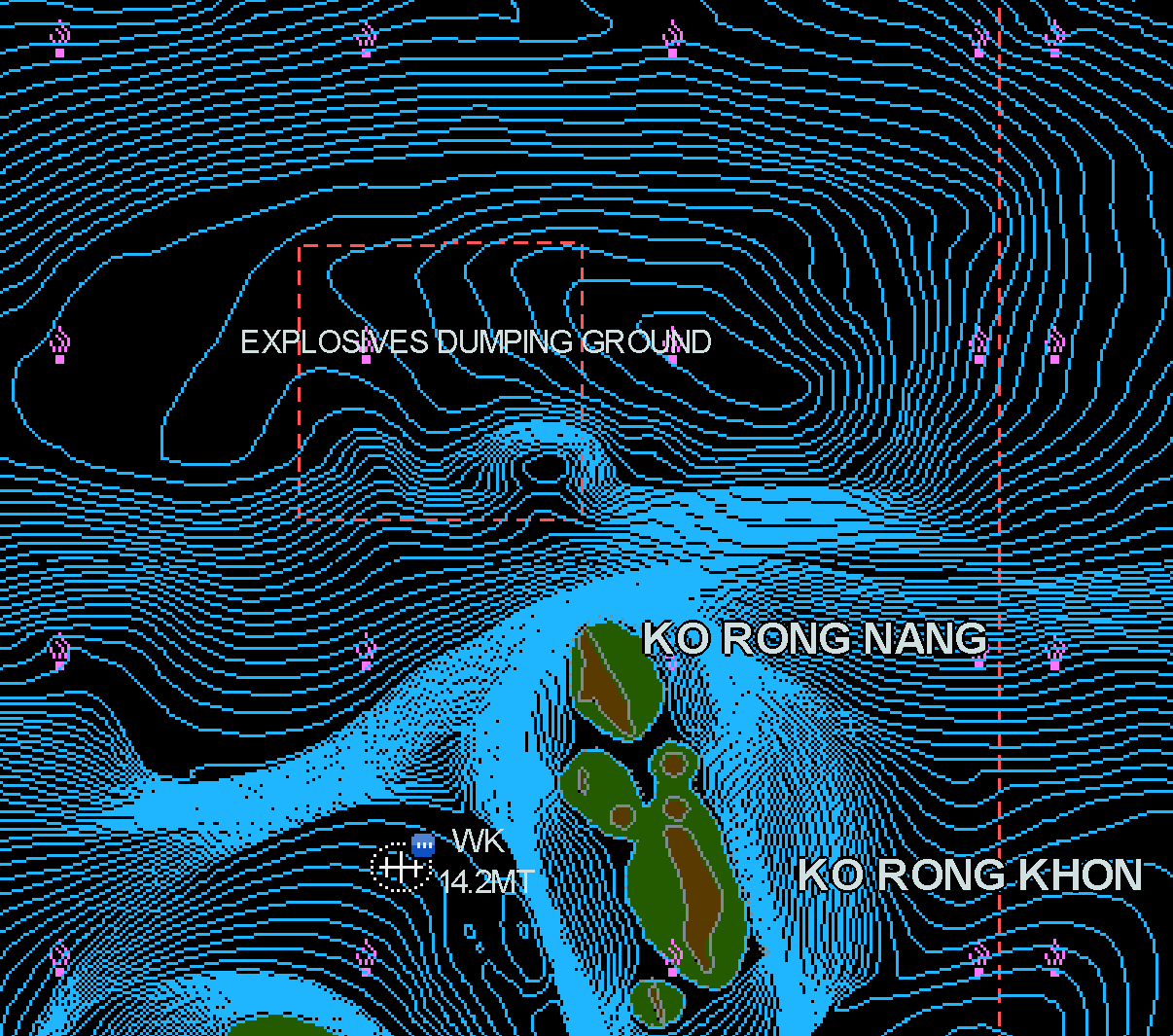
Samaesan Hole Map - Explosives Dumping Ground

The Samaesan Hole has gained popularity due to the number of hazards associated with this dive site. Specific documented risks include the following...

- Depth - The Samaesan Hole descends down to 100m, as such hypoxic trimix is mandatory
- Strong and unpredictable currents - This is caused by a large tidal range combined with currents being disrupted by flowing around several small islands. This leads to strong down currents & vortex in places. It is advised to dive this site in slack tide.
- Unexploded ordnance on the seabed: The area is marked on Sea Charts as "Explosives Dumping Ground", buoyancy control is not optional.
- Low Visibility - This can reduce down to 5-10m so meticulous dive planning is required.
- Darkness - Below 50m there is no light, compounding the poor visibility. Torches and back-ups are required.
- Situated within a busy commercial shipping lane - Robust surface support is required

== Media ==
Due to the high number of risks, media tends to report this as dangerous location and dive site. More specifically it is recognised by Red Bull as one of the most extreme dive sites in the world, whilst Under Current Dive Magazine recognised it as a "deadly" dive site, alongside the Blue Hole (Red Sea). Renowned technical diver Mark Ellyatt referred to it as the "Black Hole of Death" by virtue of its "dark and horrible" nature combined with a number of recent victims the hole had taken when he dived there. The challenging nature of this dive has attracted extreme technical dive enthusiasts from around the world and has also lead the founding of dive groups such as the Samaesan Hole Bomb Hunters who routinely dive this area.

=== Missing Technical Divers ===
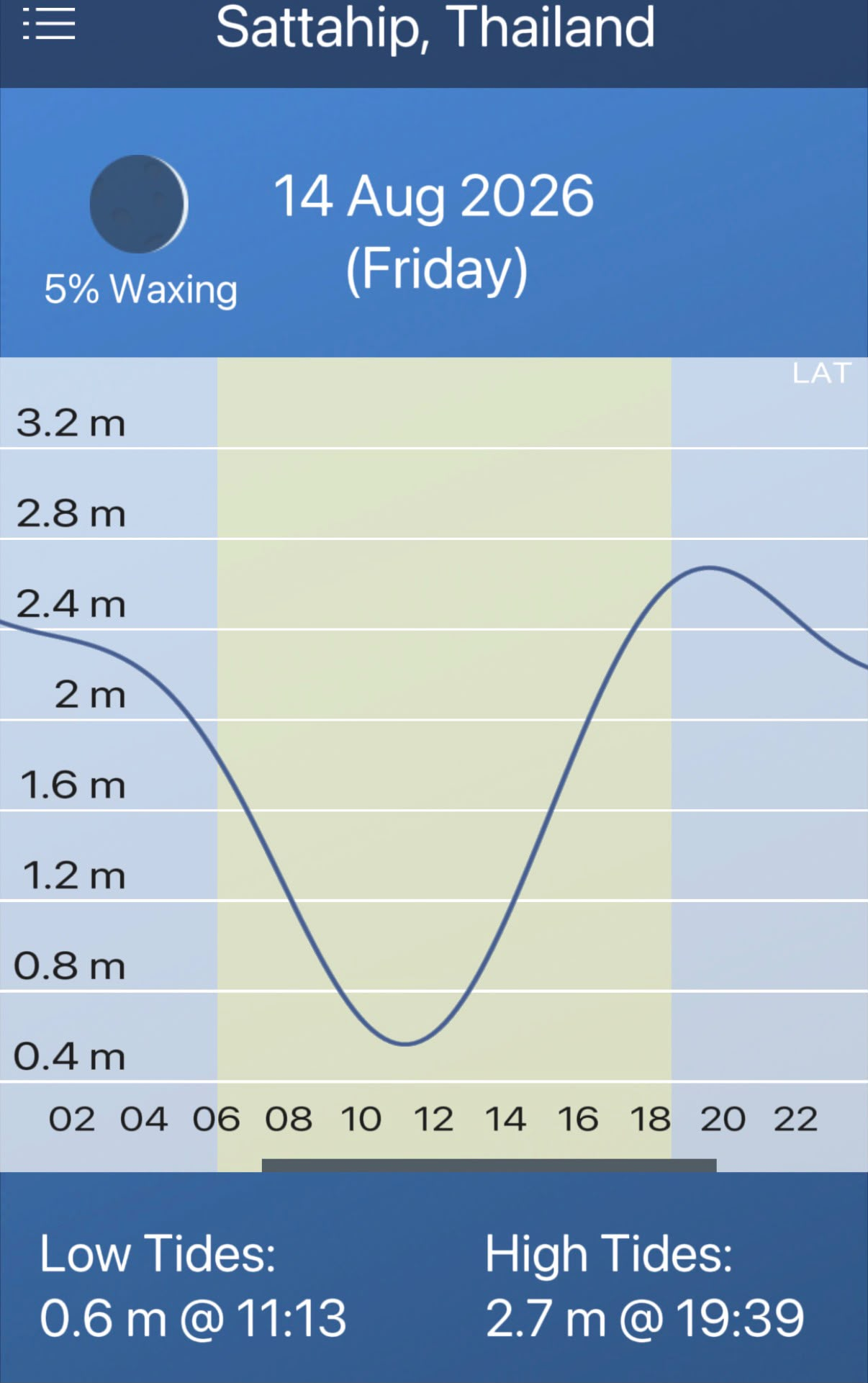
Samaesan Tides Friday 14th August: Strong Tidal Conditions

On the Friday 14th August 2026 four foreign technical divers failed to surface following a dive at Koh Rong Nang (adjacent to the Samaesan Hole). After the divers failed to surface as planned at 1500hrs the crew alerted the Thai Maritime Enforcement Command Centre and the Chonburi Maritime Command Centre. An urgent search was immediately called. At 2045hrs on 14 August 2026, naval special warfare unit frogmen spotted individuals floating near Suay Nam Sai beach. All four divers were successfully rescued and reunited with their families.
