= Ko Samae San =

Ko Samae San เกาะแสมสาร
- Island
- Location within Thailand
- Coordinates: 12°34′N 100°57′E
- Country: Thailand
- Province: Chonburi Province
- Amphoe: Sattahip
- Elevation: 153 m (502 ft)

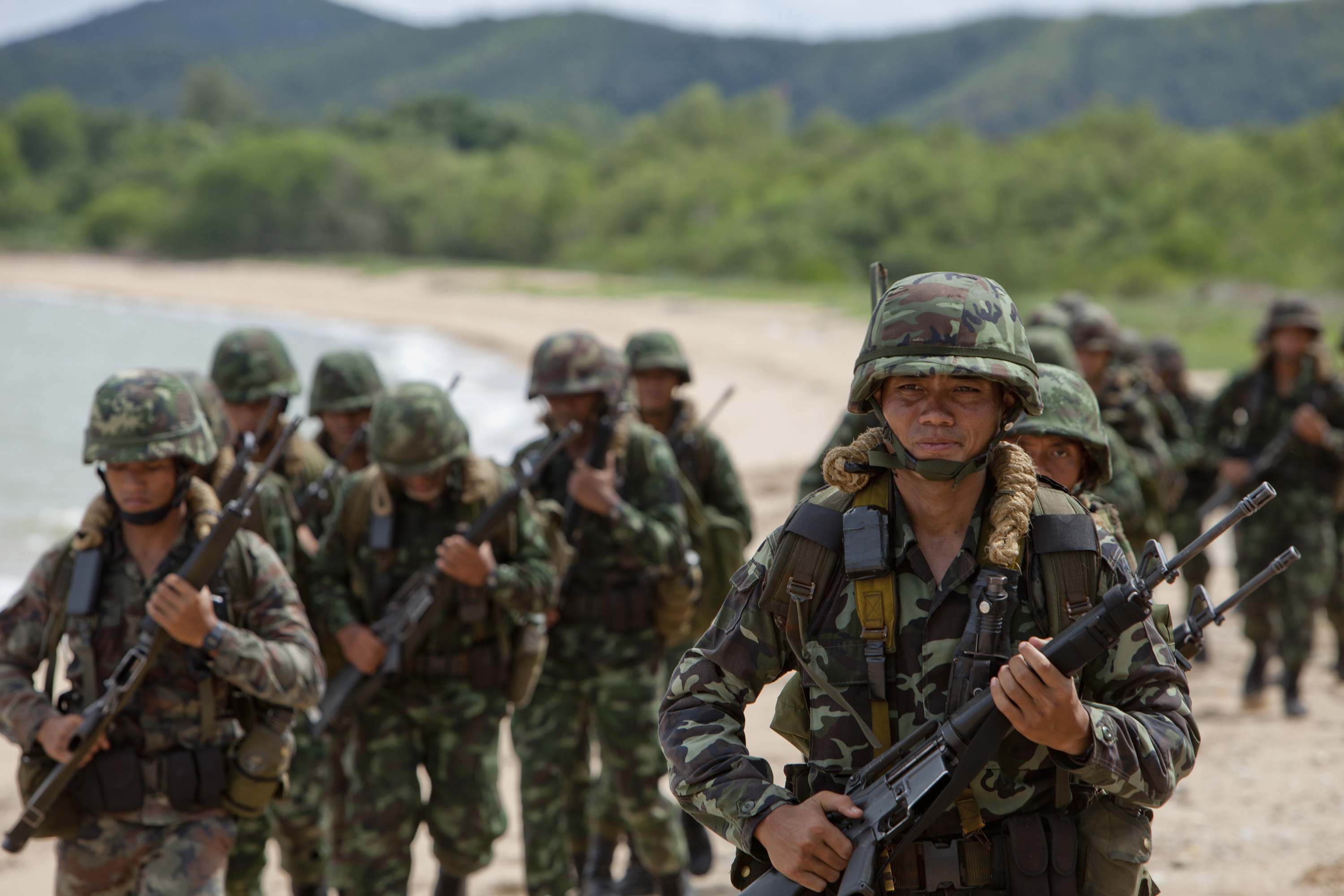
Thai marines prepare for amphibious assault training with U.S. Marines assigned to the 2nd Assault Amphibian Battalion, 2nd Marine Division during Cooperation Afloat Readiness and Training (CARAT) 2013 at Camp Samae San. 6 June 2013.

Ko Samae San (Thai: เกาะแสมสาร, pronounced [kɔ̀ʔ sā.mɛ̌ː.sǎːn]) is a small island in Sattahip District, Chonburi Province of Thailand.

== Geography ==
Ko Samae San has a length of four kilometres and its maximum width is about one kilometre. The island is thickly wooded and uninhabited. Formerly there was a fishing village on Ko Samae San, but it was vacated and the island now is under the control of the Royal Thai Navy. Some 1,240 families reside in the fishing village of Ban Samae San on the mainland. Administratively the islands belong to the Samae San Sub-district of Sattahip.

=== Islands ===
There are four main islands in the Samae San group. The northern cluster surrounds Samae San Island, while the southern subgroup is centered on Ko Chuang. Chuang Island has a small bay at its southern end. Hin Chalam (Shark Rock) is five kilometres to the south of the southern end of the group.

Name	Thai Name	Location	Coordinates
Ko Samaesan	เกาะแสมสาร	Main island of the group	12.573°N 100.95°E
Ko Kham	เกาะขาม	West of Ko Samaesan	12.573°N 100.934°E
Ko Raet	เกาะแรด	NE of Ko Samaesan	12.585°N 100.964°E
Ko Chang Kluea	เกาะฉางเกลือ	Rock east of the group	12.550°N 100.971°E
Ko Chuang	เกาะจวง	South of Ko Samaesan	12.520°N 100.96°E
Ko Chan	เกาะจาน	East of Ko Chuang	12.521°N 100.970°E
Ko Rong Nang	เกาะโรงหนัง	NE of Ko Chuang	12.53437°N 100.95870°E
Ko Rong Khon	เกาะโรงโขน	NE of Ko Chuang	12.53169°N 100.95972°E

== Preservation area ==
The Ko Kham Undersea Park is part of a royal project of Princess Maha Chakri Sirindhorn that preserves the plants and animals of the sea and island. It is home to many kinds of fish, including bluespotted stingrays, moray eels, fusilier fish, angel fish and lionfish.

== Tourism ==
Visitors are restricted, although tourist attractions on the island include fishing, swimming, bicycle riding and hiking. The islands are also well known for their diving areas. The area is particularly renowned for its technical diving with PADI referring to it as "Thailand's Hidden Gem for Tec Divers" due to the high number of easily accessible deep technical dives. A number of local dive sites feature on the list of deepest dive sites in the Gulf of Thailand, including those that hold the top three rankings. The deepest among them being the Samaesan Hole. The Samaesan Hole is considered one of the most extreme dive sites in the world due to a number of hazards including: depth, poor visibility, darkness, unexploded ordinance, strong and unpredictable currents as well as it being situated in a commercial shipping lane. Since the island is within a military area, off-limits for casual tourists, booking has to be done through local travel agents.

=== Technical Dive Sites ===
Name	Max. depth	Coordinates	Level	First Recorded Dive
Samaesan Hole	85m	12°32.314′N 100°57.616′E	Trimix 90, CCR100	Steve Burton, 1998
Sharkfin Deep Drop / Samaesan Cliff	85m	12°31.705′N 100°56.020′E	Trimix 90, CCR100	Steve Burton, 1998
1/4 Mile Mouthpiece Drop	75m	12°30.094′N 100°57.233′E	Trimix 90, CCR100	Troy Jamieson & Ryland Cairns, 2026
Thunder Bowl	65m	12°32.807′N 100°55.655′E	Trimix 65+, CCR100	Troy Jamieson & Ryland Cairns, 2026
Narcosis Colosseum	50m	12°30.128′N 100°57.191′E	Tec 50+	Troy Jamieson & Ryland Cairns, 2026
Koh Rong Nang Training Buoy	37m-50m	12°32.968′N 100°57.298′E	Tec 40+	No records found
Hardeep Wreck	36m	12°31.556′N 100°57.196′E	Tec 40+	No records found

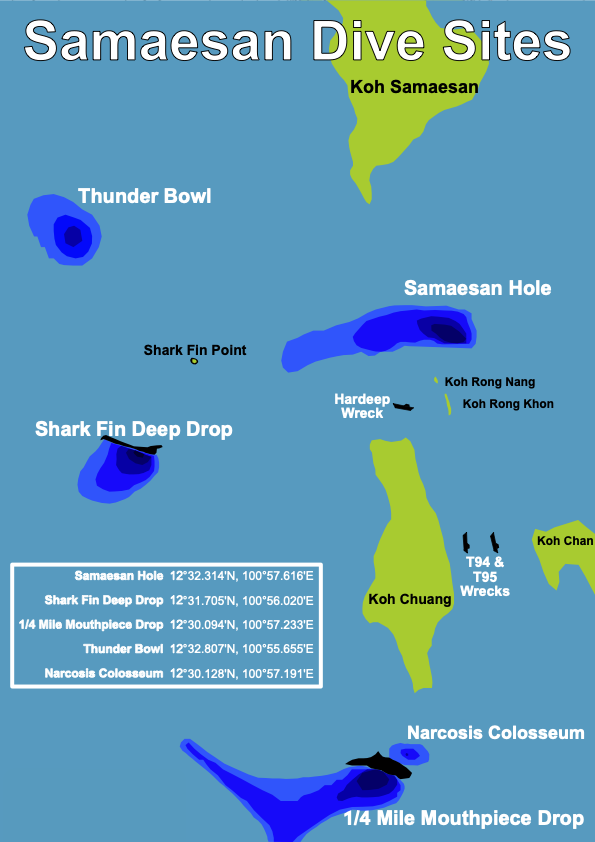
Ko Samaesan Technical Dive Sites

== See also ==
- List of islands of Thailand
