= The Amazing Race 19 =

Season of television series

- Season 19
- Region 1 DVD cover
- Presented by: Phil Keoghan
- No. of teams: 11
- Winners: Ernie Halvorsen & Cindy Chiang
- No. of legs: 12
- Distance traveled: 35,000 mi (56,000 km)
- No. of episodes: 12

Release
- Original network: CBS
- Original release: September 25 – December 11, 2011

Additional information
- Filming dates: June 18 – July 10, 2011

Series chronology
- ← Previous; Season 18 Next → Season 20

The Amazing Race 19 is the nineteenth season of the American reality competition show The Amazing Race. Hosted by Phil Keoghan, it featured eleven teams of two, each with a pre-existing relationship, competing in a race around the world to win US$1,000,000. This season visited four continents and ten countries and traveled over 35,000 miles (56,000 km) during twelve legs. Starting in Hacienda Heights, California, racers traveled through Taiwan, Indonesia, Thailand, Malawi, Denmark, Germany, Belgium, the Netherlands, and Panama before returning to the United States and finishing in Atlanta. New elements introduced in this season include the Hazard – an extra task for the last team to finish the first task – and a double elimination leg. The season premiered on CBS on September 25, 2011, and concluded on December 11, 2011.

Engaged couple Ernie Halvorsen and Cindy Chiang were the winners of this season, while dating couple Jeremy Cline and Sandy Draghi finished in second place, and married couple Amani and Marcus Pollard finished in third place.

== Production ==
=== Development and filming ===
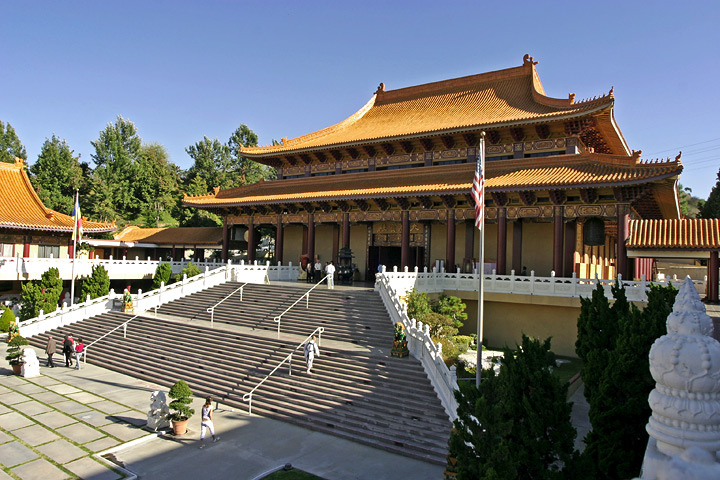
Hacienda Heights's Hsi Lai Temple was the site of the starting line for The Amazing Race 19, where teams had to first search through several oil-paper umbrellas.

This season traveled a little over 35,000 miles (56,000 km) to 20 cities across four continents. This season included first-time visits to Denmark, Indonesia, Malawi, and Belgium. Filming started on June 18, 2011, with teams seen leaving Los Angeles International Airport and heading to Taiwan. As with the previous season, racers had a task they had to perform before receiving tickets to their first destination. American film crews were also spotted in Hillerød, Denmark on July 4.

Two new game elements were introduced in this season. Leg 1 introduced the Hazard: a penalty that one team incurred for being the last team to finish the starting line task. According to Phil Keoghan, the Hazard was added to "test people's mental strength out of the gate", and claimed that it had a "rolling effect" throughout the rest of the season. Leg 2 was the first time in which two teams were eliminated at the Pit Stop.

During the first leg, Kaylani Paliotta lost her passport at a gas station while en route from Hsi Lai Temple to Los Angeles International Airport. Kaylani & Lisa returned to the gas station to search for the passport, but could not find it and opted to proceed to the airport, hoping that another racer had picked it up. The camera crew accompanying the team had seen the dropped passport, but could not act on it, and instead informed production of the situation. Production prepared to conduct an impromptu elimination and Phil Keoghan rushed to the airport. The passport was found by two bystanders who had previously helped another team at the gas station. After posting about the incident on Twitter, a fan of the show advised them to take the passport to the airport, and they were able to return it to Kaylani before her scheduled flight.

Leg 5 was supposed to take place in Laos, but a monsoon caused heavy flooding in the country and forced the production team to construct an additional leg in Thailand instead. Laos would eventually be visited later in The Amazing Race 31.

== Release ==
=== Broadcast ===
On March 28, 2011, The Amazing Race was renewed for a nineteenth season set to air during the 2011–12 television schedule. On August 31, 2011, CBS announced that the season would premiere on September 25.

=== Marketing ===
Discover Card returned as one of the sponsors. Travelocity continued to sponsor the show, while Ford also returned as one of the sponsors, with their fifth generation Ford Mustang appearing as a prize car in the 10th leg, customized by the winner.

== Contestants ==
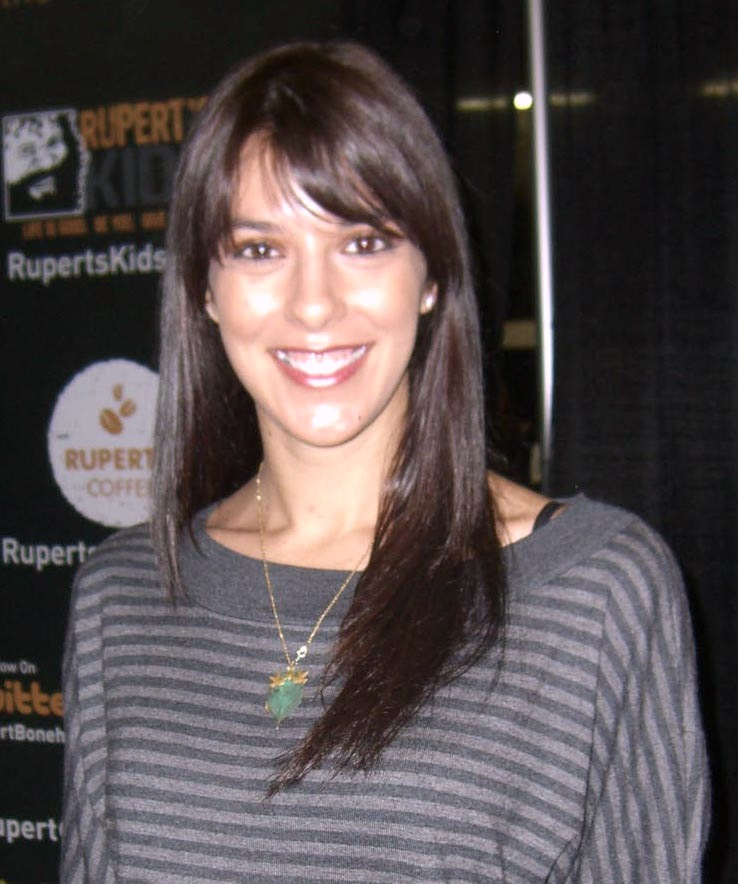
Jenna Morasca

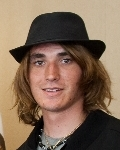
Zac Sunderland

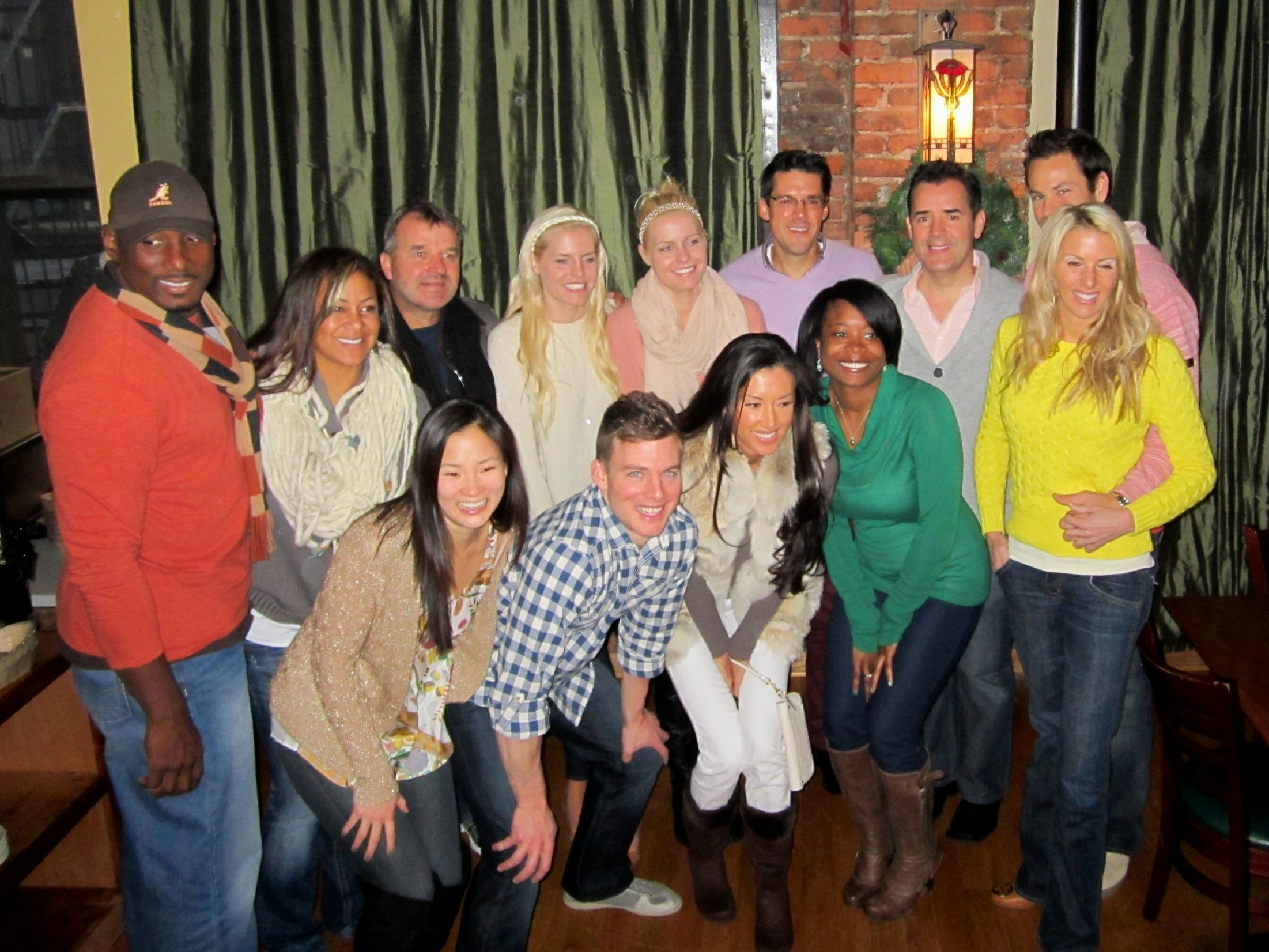
(back row): Marcus Pollard, Amani Pollard, Laurence Sunderland, Liz Canavan, Marie Canavan, Ron Zeitz, Bill Smith, and Jeremy Cline (front row): Cindy Chiang, Ernie Halvorsen, Kaylani Paliotta, Jennifer Young, and Sandy Draghi.

Some of the more prominent members of the cast included Survivor: Africa winner Ethan Zohn and Survivor: The Amazon winner Jenna Morasca, former sailor Zac Sunderland, professional snowboarders Andy Finch and Tommy Czeschin and former NFL tight end Marcus Pollard.

Contestants	Age	Relationship	Hometown	Status
Ron Zeitz	44	Domestic Partners	Laguna Niguel, California	Eliminated 1st & 2nd (in Yogyakarta, Indonesia)
Bill Smith	49	Domestic Partners	Laguna Niguel, California	Eliminated 1st & 2nd (in Yogyakarta, Indonesia)
Ethan Zohn	37	Dating	New York City, New York	Eliminated 1st & 2nd (in Yogyakarta, Indonesia)
Jenna Morasca	30	Dating	New York City, New York	Eliminated 1st & 2nd (in Yogyakarta, Indonesia)
Kaylani Paliotta	33	Former Vegas Showgirls	Las Vegas, Nevada	Eliminated 3rd (in Magelang, Indonesia)
Lisa Tilley	32	Former Vegas Showgirls	Las Vegas, Nevada	Eliminated 3rd (in Magelang, Indonesia)
Liz Canavan	24	Twins	Deerfield, Illinois	Eliminated 4th (in Bangkok, Thailand)
Marie Canavan	24	Twins	Deerfield, Illinois	Eliminated 4th (in Bangkok, Thailand)
Justin Young	31	Siblings	Stone Mountain, Georgia	Eliminated 5th (in Senga Bay, Malawi)
Jennifer Young	26	Siblings	Stone Mountain, Georgia	Eliminated 5th (in Senga Bay, Malawi)
Laurence Sunderland	48	Father & Son Adventurers	Thousand Oaks, California	Eliminated 6th (in Copenhagen, Denmark)
Zac Sunderland	19	Father & Son Adventurers	Thousand Oaks, California	Eliminated 6th (in Copenhagen, Denmark)
Bill Alden	63	Grandparents	Albany, Oregon	Eliminated 7th (in Brussels, Belgium)
Cathi Alden	62	Grandparents	Albany, Oregon	Eliminated 7th (in Brussels, Belgium)
Andy Finch	30	Pro Snowboarders	Truckee, California	Eliminated 8th (in Panama City, Panama)
Tommy Czeschin	32	Pro Snowboarders	Crowley Lake, California	Eliminated 8th (in Panama City, Panama)
Amani Pollard	36	Married	Pine Mountain, Georgia	Third place
Marcus Pollard	39	Married	Pine Mountain, Georgia	Third place
Jeremy Cline	35	Dating	Alamo, California	Runners-up
Sandy Draghi	33	Dating	Dublin, California	Runners-up
Ernie Halvorsen	29	Engaged	Chicago, Illinois	Winners
Cindy Chiang	30	Engaged	Chicago, Illinois	Winners

Future appearances

Ernie & Cindy appeared on the final episode of The Amazing Race 29 where they handed tickets to the final three teams entering Wrigley Field in their hometown of Chicago.

Ethan Zohn returned to compete on Survivor: Winners at War.

== Results ==
The following teams are listed with their placements in each leg. Placements are listed in finishing order.

- A red placement with a dagger (†) indicates that the team was eliminated.
- An underlined blue placement with a double-dagger (‡) indicates that the team was the last to arrive at a Pit Stop in a non-elimination leg, and had to perform a Speed Bump task in the following leg.
- An italicized and underlined placement indicates that the team was the last to arrive at a Pit Stop, but there was no rest period at the Pit Stop and all teams were instructed to continue racing. There was no required Speed Bump task in the next leg.
- A purple ε indicates that the team used an Express Pass on that leg to bypass one of their tasks.
- A brown ⊃ indicates that the team used the U-Turn and a brown ⊂ indicates the team on the receiving end of the U-Turn.

Team placement (by leg)
Team	1	2 (Note: Eight of the teams arrived at the Pit Stop without having donated all of their money to the orphanage as they'd been instructed, and they had to go back before checking in. The initial placements for all of the teams were as follows: 1st: Ernie & Cindy; 2nd: Liz & Marie; 3rd: Bill & Cathi; 4th: Andy & Tommy; 5th: Jeremy & Sandy; 6th: Justin & Jennifer; 7th: Amani & Marcus; 8th: Laurence & Zac; 9th: Ethan & Jenna; 10th: Kaylani & Lisa; 11th: Ron & Bill. Andy & Tommy, Laurence & Zac, and Kaylani & Lisa did not have to return to the orphanage, because they had correctly donated all of their money.)	3	4	5	6	7	8	9	10	11	12
Ernie & Cindy	1st	4th	5th	5th	3rd	5th	2ndε (Note: Ernie & Cindy used their Express Pass to bypass the Detour on this leg.)	1st⊃ (Note: Ernie & Cindy chose to use the U-Turn on Bill & Cathi.)	2nd	3rd	2nd	1st
Jeremy & Sandy	2nd	6th	3rd	3rd	7th	3rd	6th	5th	3rd	2nd	1st	2nd
Amani & Marcus	5th	9th	6th	6th	1st	7th‡	4th	4th	1st	4th	3rd	3rd
Andy & Tommy	7th	1st	1st	1st	5th	1st	1st	3rd	4th	1st	4th†	
Bill & Cathi	11th‡	7th	7th	7th	2nd	6th (Note: Justin & Jennifer and Bill & Cathi initially arrived 1st and 3rd, respectively, but did not pay the truck drivers who drove them to the Pit Stop. They had to pay their drivers before being allowed to check in. Their placements dropped to 2nd and 6th, respectively.)	3rd	2nd^{⊂}_{⊃} (Note: Bill & Cathi chose to use the U-Turn on Laurence & Zac.)	5th (Note: This team arrived last at the Pit Stop, but they were instructed to continue racing. There was no Speed Bump task in the next leg.)	5th†		
Laurence & Zac	6th	2nd	2nd (Note: Laurence & Zac initially arrived 1st, but were issued a 15-minute penalty for having used more than the allotted number of buckets at the Detour. Andy & Tommy checked in during this penalty time, dropping Laurence & Zac to 2nd.)	4th	6th	4th	5th	6th†⊂				
Justin & Jennifer	3rd	8th	4th	2nd	4th	2nd	7th†					
Liz & Marie	10th	5th	8th	8th‡	8th†							
Kaylani & Lisa	9th	3rd	9th†									
Ethan & Jenna	4th	10th† (Note: This was a double-elimination leg; the last two teams to check in at the Pit Stop were both eliminated.)										
Ron & Bill	8th	11th†										

== Race summary ==
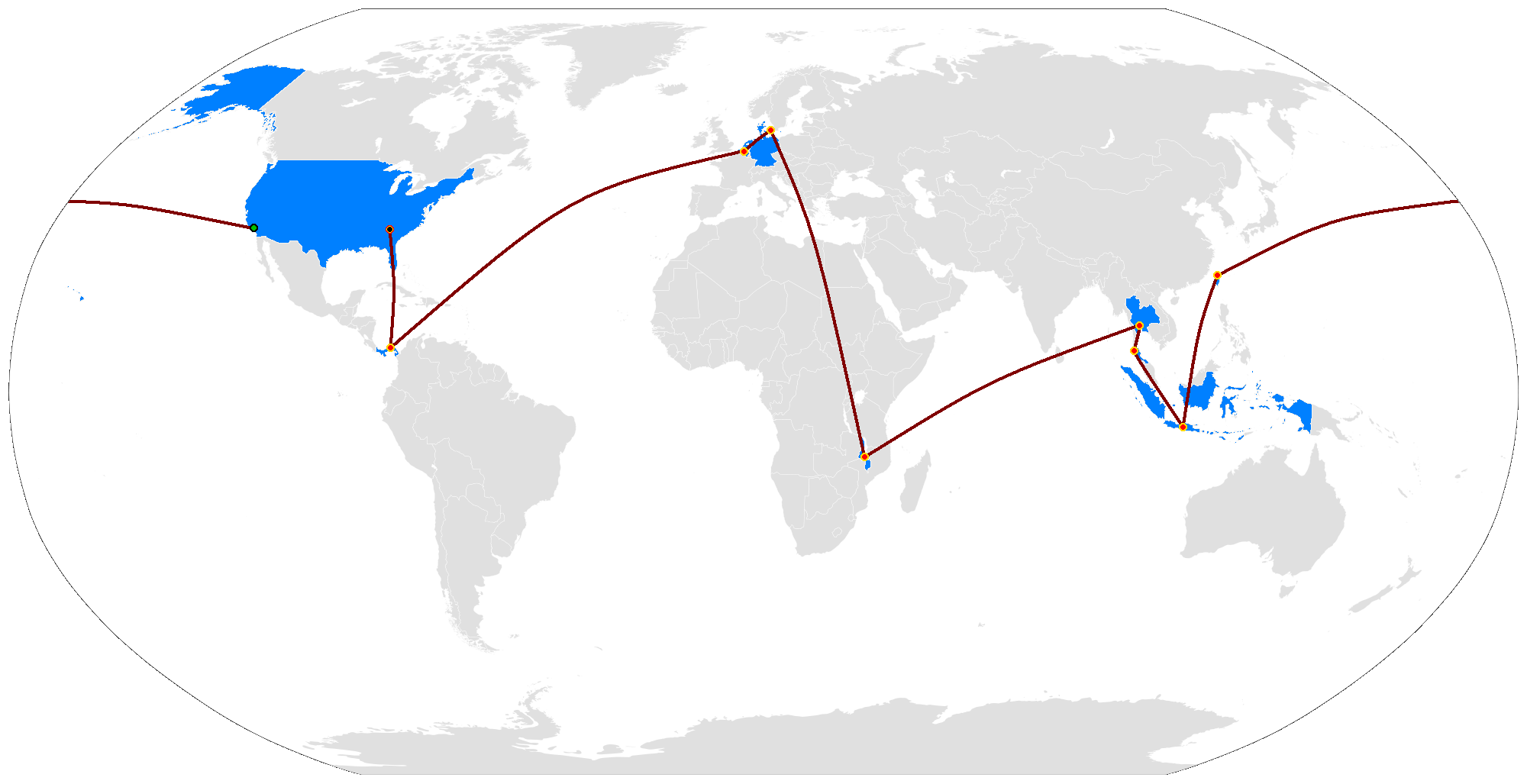
The route of The Amazing Race 19.

Destinations	Air travel Rail travel Water travel Bus travel Helicopter travel Bicycle travel Gondola travel
Route Markers	Detour Roadblock Hazard U-Turn Speed Bump Pit Stop

=== Leg 1 (United States → Taiwan) ===
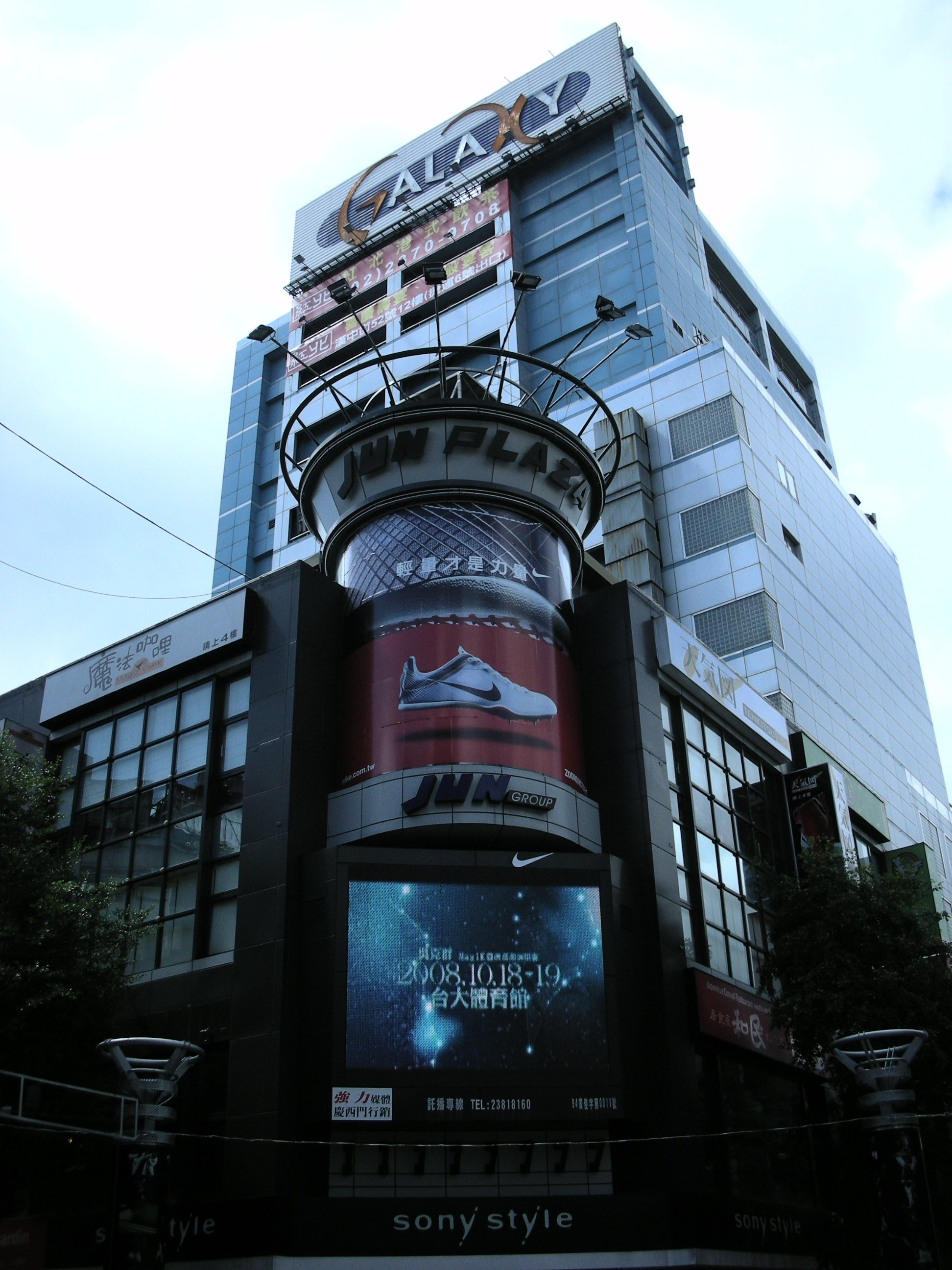
After arriving in Taipei, teams had to look for their clue written in Mandarin on a digital billboard in Ximending.

- Episode 1: "Kindness of Strangers" (September 25, 2011)
- Prize: The Express Pass (awarded to Ernie & Cindy)

Locations

- Hacienda Heights, California (Hsi Lai Temple) (Starting Line)
- Los Angeles (Los Angeles International Airport) → Taipei, Taiwan
- Taipei (Ximending Commercial District)
- Taipei (Taipei Confucius Temple)
- Taipei (Core Pacific City Mall)
- Taipei (Dajia Riverside Park)
- Taipei (Martyrs' Shrine)

Episode summary

- At Hsi Lai Temple, teams had to search through hundreds of oil-paper umbrellas for one that had the correct set of letters – TAI – printed on it. When combined twice with their clue of six other letters – WANPEI – it revealed the name of their first destination: Taipei, Taiwan. Once they presented Phil with a correct umbrella, he gave them keys to one of the vehicles parked outside the temple. The last team to complete this task (Kaylani & Lisa) would be penalized with a Hazard later in the leg.
- The first eight teams to arrive at Los Angeles International Airport were booked on an earlier flight to Taipei via China Airlines with the remaining three teams booked on a second flight via EVA Air that departed twenty minutes later. Once there, teams had to travel to the Ximending Commercial District, where they were told to "look up" for their next clue and had to figure out that their clue was displayed on a digital billboard at Jun Plaza: red and yellow balloons that revealed the Chinese characters 台北孔廟 (Taipei Confucius Temple).
- In this season's first Roadblock, one team member had to find a nearby payphone, call a given phone number, and listen to one of Confucius's proverbs: "In all things, success depends on previous preparation, and without such previous preparation, there is sure to be failure." Without writing down any of the message, they had to repeat the proverb verbatim to a monk in order to receive their next clue. If they were incorrect, they had to call the number again before trying again.
- The Hazard required Kaylani & Lisa to travel to the Core Pacific City Mall, where one of them had to perform an indoor bungee jump before they could continue racing.
- After the Roadblock, teams had to travel to Dajia Riverside Park, where they had to join a dragon boat team. One team member kept pace by beating a drum while the other team member joined the paddling crew on the Keelung River. Once they made it through the course, they received their next clue directing them to the Pit Stop: the Martyrs' Shrine.

Additional note

- This was a non-elimination leg.

=== Leg 2 (Taiwan → Indonesia) ===
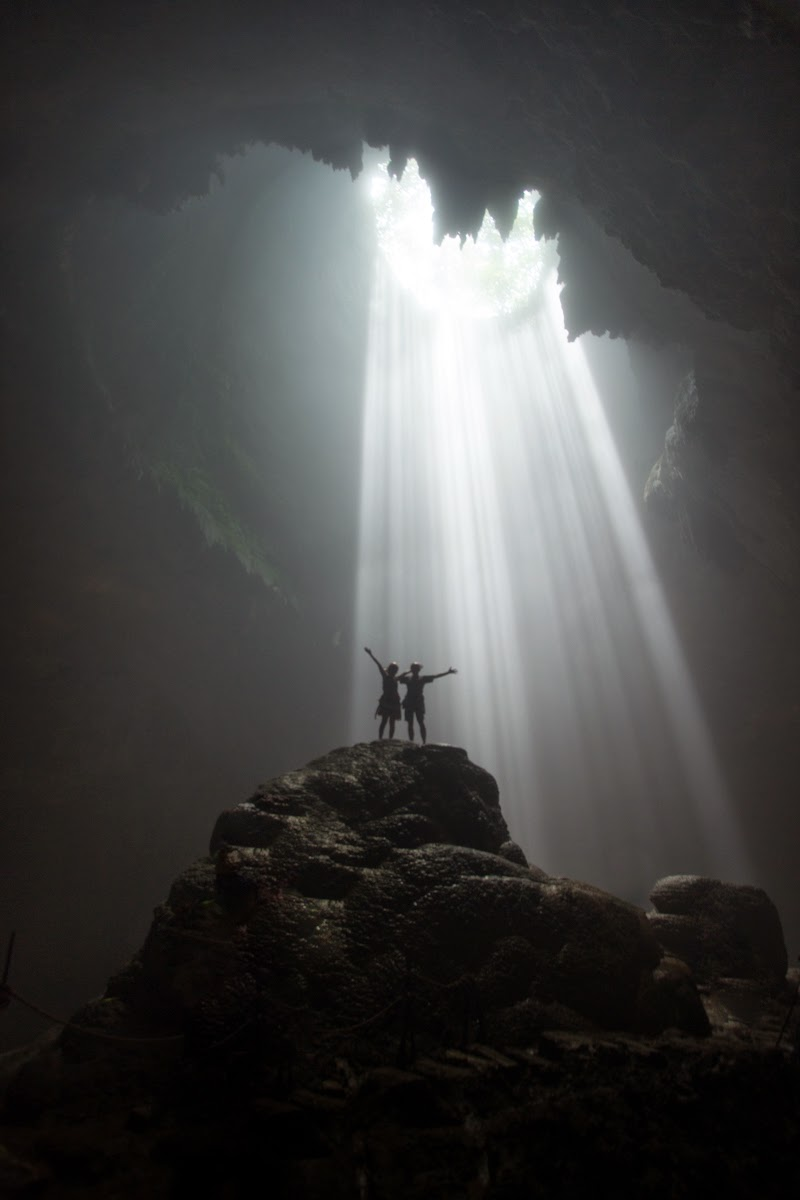
The Roadblock in Yogyakarta had racers spelunking the natural caves of Goa Jomblang to find a kris.

- Episode 2: "The Sprint of Our Life" (October 2, 2011)
- Prize: A trip to the Carton House in Ireland (awarded to Andy & Tommy)
- Eliminated: Ron & Bill and Ethan & Jenna

Locations

- Taipei (Martyrs' Shrine)
- Taipei → Jakarta, Indonesia
- Jakarta → Yogyakarta
- Piyungan (Bukit Indah Restaurant & Hotel) (Unaired)
- Semanu (Goa Jomblang)
- Yogyakarta (Intersections near Yogyakarta's Kilometer Zero or Mal Malioboro)
- Yogyakarta (Aisyiyah Orphanage)
- Yogyakarta (Kraton Ngayogyakarta Hadiningrat)

Episode summary

- At the start of this leg, teams were instructed to fly to Jakarta, Indonesia. Once there, teams had to travel by train to Yogyakarta, and then travel to Goa Jomblang, where teams found their next clue.
- For their Speed Bump, Bill & Cathi had to untangle a rope until they had enough length to reach a carabiner across a field before they could continue with the Roadblock.
- In this leg's Roadblock, one team member had to descend 160 feet (49 m) into Goa Jomblang and search for a traditional Javanese mask and a dagger known as a kris. Once they located them, team members had to climb a bamboo ladder and deliver them to the chieftain in exchange for their next clue.
- This season's first Detour was a choice between Shake Your Money Maker or Be a Ticket Taker. In Shake Your Money Maker, teams had to dress in costumes, with one team member dancing in the streets while the other played a gamelan, and had to earn Rp 30,000 (roughly $3.40) in order to receive their next clue. In Be a Ticket Taker, teams had to go to the Mal Malioboro, work as motorbike parking attendants, and earn Rp 15,000 (roughly $1.70) before exchanging their ticket book for their next clue.
- After completing either Detour task, teams traveled to the Aisyiyah Orphanage, home to orphans of the 2010 eruptions of Mount Merapi, where they had to donate all of the money in their possession. Teams received a coat of arms from the children and had to figure out that it belonged to the Sultan and that the Pit Stop was at his palace: Kraton Ngayogyakarta Hadiningrat. Eight of the teams arrived at the Pit Stop without having donated all of their money as they'd been instructed, and had to go back before they could check in.

Additional notes

- In an unaired segment, teams traveled to the Bukit Indah Restaurant & Hotel after arriving in Yogyakarta, where they had to randomly choose a key, which was marked with one of two departure times the next morning.
- This was a double-elimination leg.

=== Leg 3 (Indonesia) ===
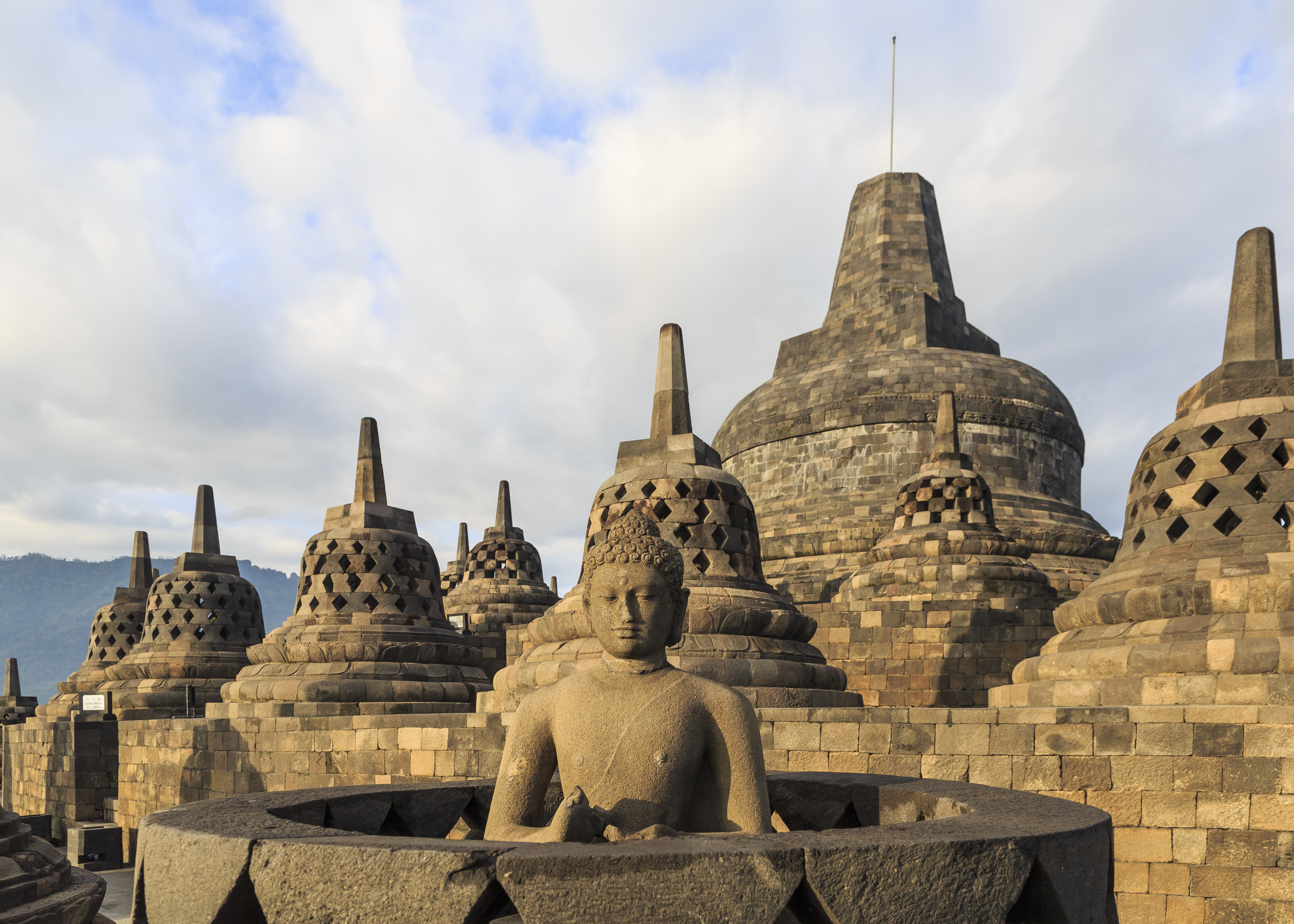
Borobudur, the largest Buddhist temple in the world, served as both the site of this leg's Roadblock and the Pit Stop.

- Episode 3: "Don't Lay Down on Me Now!" (October 9, 2011)
- Prize: A trip to Atlantis, The Palm in Dubai (awarded to Andy & Tommy)
- Eliminated: Kaylani & Lisa

Locations

- Yogyakarta (Kraton Ngayogyakarta Hadiningrat)
- Yogyakarta (Fort Vredeburg)
- Salakmalang Village (Lesehan Restaurant)
- Magelang (Borobudur)

Episode summary

- At the start of this leg, teams had to join a series of Dutch colonial-era Bicycle Guard reenactors and ride omafiets with their group from Kraton through the streets of Yogyakarta to Fort Vredeburg, where they received their next clue directing them to the Salakmalang Village.
- This leg's Detour was a choice between Rice Field or Grass Fed. In Rice Field, teams carried lunch to rice paddy workers and, while the workers ate their lunch, planted 300 rice seedlings in order to receive their next clue. In Grass Fed, teams had to fill two bags with freshly cut grass and then pick up two sheep from a shed. After delivering the grass and sheep to a farm, they had to retrieve six buckets of water from a well, using only two buckets at a time, in order to fill a trough for the sheep and receive their next clue.
- After the Detour, teams traveled to Borobudur. They had to use the international entrance, where they were given batik sarongs to put on. They then walked up to the top of the temple, where they received their next clue.
- In this leg's Roadblock, one team member had to walk around the top tier of Borobudur in a clockwise direction, counting the statues of the Five Dhyani Buddhas, while also paying attention to the mudra depicted on the statues. Each racer had to provide the correct numbers of Buddhas by mudra, including a demonstration of each, in order to receive their next clue, which directed them to the nearby Pit Stop.

=== Leg 4 (Indonesia → Thailand) ===
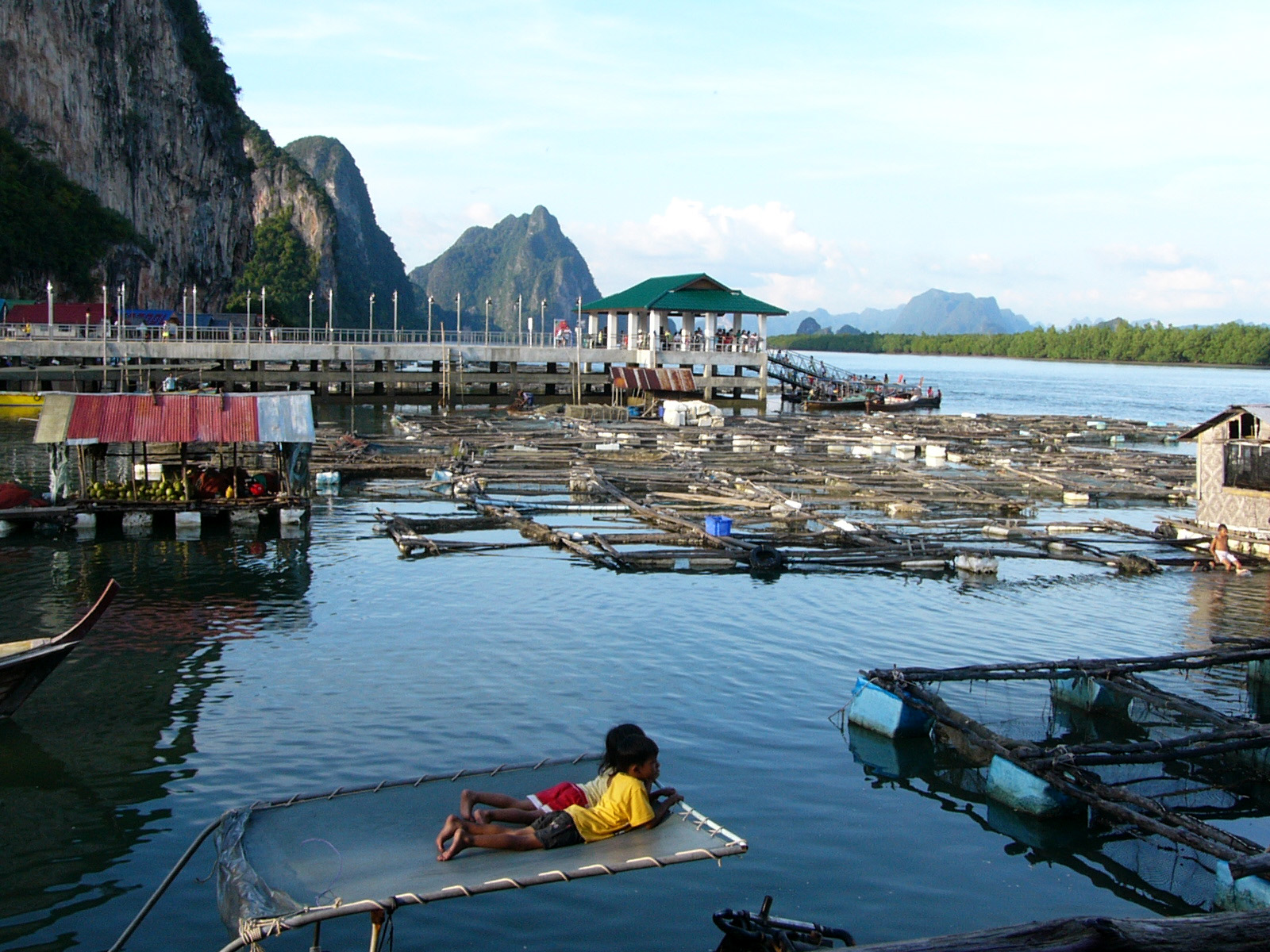
Teams finished this leg on Thailand's traditional floating village of Koh Panyi.

- Episode 4: "This Is Gonna Be a Fine Mess" (October 16, 2011)
- Prize: US$5,000 each (awarded to Andy & Tommy)

Locations

- Yogyakarta (Sheraton Mustika Yogyakarta Resort & Spa)
- Yogyakarta → Phuket, Thailand
- Mueang Phuket (Nonthasak Marina)
- Ao Phang Nga National Park (Khai Nai Island)
- Ao Phang Nga National Park (Soap Island)
- Ao Phang Nga National Park (Koh Yao Noi)
- Ao Phang Nga National Park (Koh Panyi – Soccer Field)

Episode summary

- At the start of this leg, teams were instructed to fly to Phuket, Thailand. Once there, teams had to travel to the Nonthasak Marina and find their next clue.
- This leg's Detour was a choice between Coral Reconstruction or Beach Preparation, both tasks designed to help Thailand recover following the 2004 tsunami. In each task, teams rode on speedboats to Khai Nai Island. In Coral Reconstruction, teams built a coral nursery out of pipes. Once complete, they used a kayak to take the nursery and several coral fragments out to a buoy where they had to set the nursery on the ocean floor and then properly set the coral fragments into the nursery in order to receive their next clue. In Beach Preparation, teams had to properly set up a series of twenty beach chairs and ten umbrellas marked with a specific symbol given in their clue in order to receive their next clue.
- After the Detour, teams were given a compass and a medallion and were instructed to travel north for thirteen minutes until they reached the island shown on the medallion: Soap Island.
- In this leg's Roadblock, teams traveled to Koh Yao Noi, where one team member had to climb the island's sheer rock wall until they reached a bird's nest that held their next clue.
- After the Roadblock, teams were given a map of Phang Nga province and a compass and were instructed to lead their boat captain to the Pit Stop at Koh Panyi.

Additional note

- This was a non-elimination leg.

=== Leg 5 (Thailand) ===
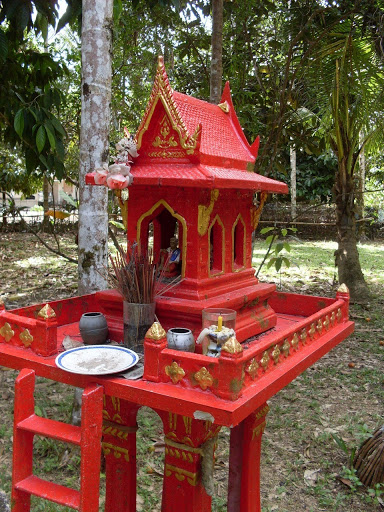
For the second Roadblock on this leg, racers had to reassemble a spirit house that they originally disassembled.

- Episode 5: "I Feel Like I'm in the Circus" (October 23, 2011)
- Prize: A trip to Bali, Indonesia (awarded to Amani & Marcus)
- Eliminated: Liz & Marie

Locations

- Ao Phang Nga National Park (Koh Panyi – Soccer Field)
- Mueang Phang Nga (Ton Pariwat Wildlife Conservation Area – Anda Adventures)
- Mueang Phang Nga (Song Phraek – Spirit house Shop)
- Mueang Phang Nga (Noppring – Wat Chanathikaram)
- Mueang Phuket → Bangkok
- Bangkok (Wat Suwannaram – Bangkok Noi Canal)
- Bangkok (M.R. Kukrit Heritage House)

Episode summary

- At the start of this leg, teams had to travel to the Ton Pariwat Wildlife Conservation Area. There, teams had to ride elephants up the Khlong Song Phraek River to their next clue.
- For their Speed Bump, Liz & Marie had to clean up elephant dung and wash an elephant before they could ride it to the Roadblock.
- In this leg's first Roadblock, one team member searched for a man playing a traditional Thai flute and then had to search the water around him for a bundle that contained a ceramic carp with their clue inside.
- After the first Roadblock, teams had to travel to a nearby store, take apart a traditional spirit house, and then deliver it to Wat Chanathikaram, where they found their next clue.
- In this leg's second Roadblock, the team member who did not perform the previous Roadblock had to correctly rebuild the spirit house in order to receive a bag of fish food and their next clue.
- After the second Roadblock, teams had to travel by bus to Bangkok and then travel to the Bangkok Noi Canal, where they had to feed the fish at the canal in order to receive their next clue. Teams were then directed to the Pit Stop: the M.R. Kukrit Heritage House.

=== Leg 6 (Thailand → Malawi) ===
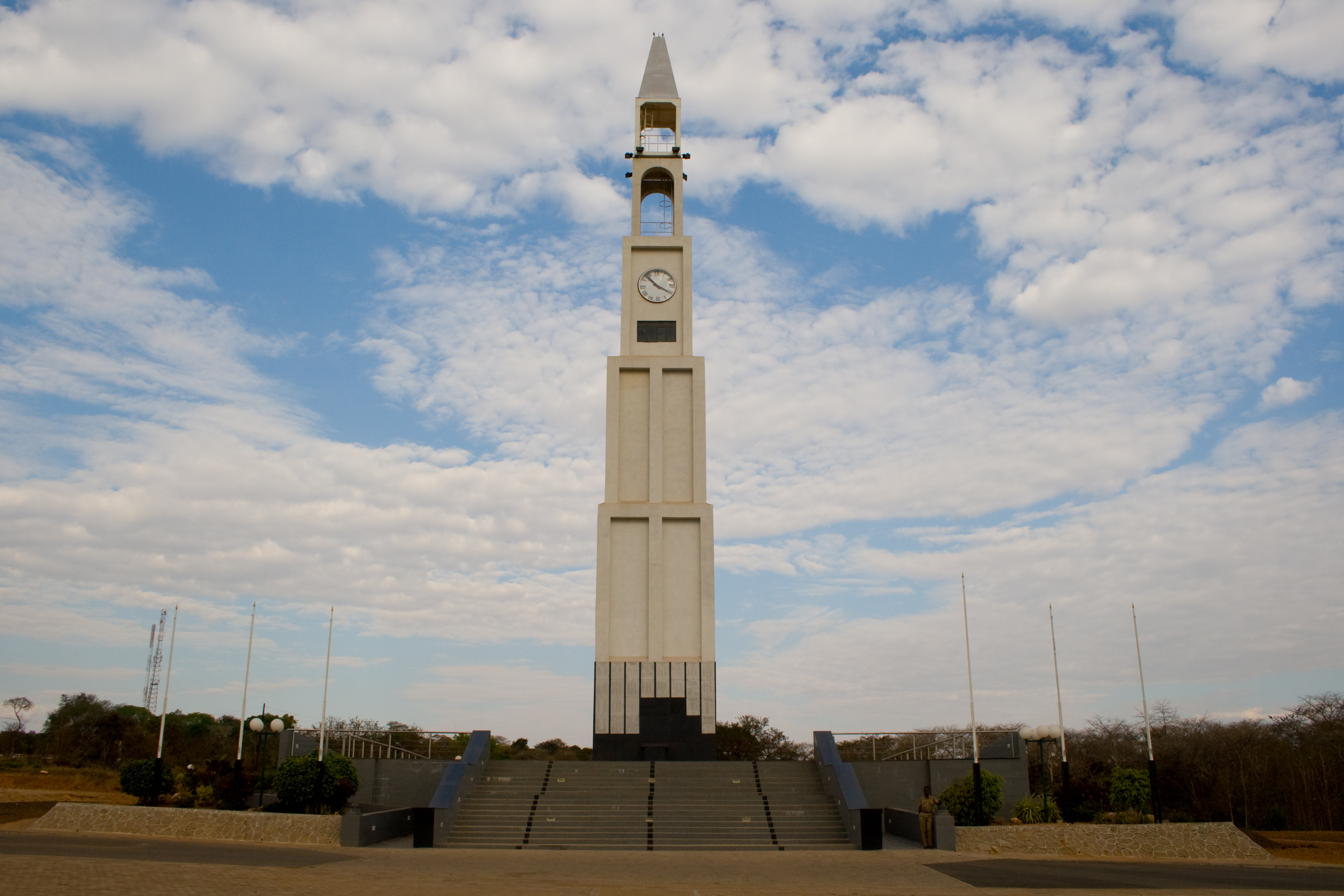
While in Lilongwe, Malawi, teams found a clue at the King's African Rifles National War Memorial, which commemorates the African soldiers who fought during both World Wars.

- Episode 6: "We Love Your Country Already; It Is Very Spacious" (October 30, 2011)
- Prize: A trip for two to the British Virgin Islands (awarded to Andy & Tommy)

Locations

- Bangkok (M.R. Kukrit Heritage House)
- Bangkok → Lilongwe, Malawi
- Lilongwe (Limbe Tobacco Warehouse)
- Lilongwe (Memorial Tower)
- Lilongwe (Old Market – White Horse De-Signs Tailor Shop or Lilongwe LEA School)
- Lilongwe (Mchesi – R-K Furniture Shop)
- Lilongwe (Kumbali Village)

Episode summary

- At the start of this leg, teams were instructed to fly to Lilongwe, Malawi. Once there, teams had to travel to Limbe Tobacco Warehouse and find their next clue.
- In this leg's Roadblock, one team member had to transport ten 200-pound (91 kg) bales of tobacco leaves through a warehouse, using only a handcart that could carry one bag at a time, to a drop-off zone in another part of the warehouse in order to receive their next clue.
- After the Roadblock, teams had to travel to the Memorial Tower, where they found their next clue.
- This leg's Detour was a choice between All Sewn Up or Not Grown Up. In All Sewn Up, teams went to the White Horse De-Sign Tailor Shop in the old market and chose a customer. They then used manual sewing machines to finish the customer's suit in order to receive their next clue. In Not Grown Up, teams traveled to Lilongwe LEA School, where they had to use provided materials to build two toy trucks. Once they were properly constructed, the headmistress gave the trucks to students, who tested them before the team received their next clue.
- After the Detour, teams had to find their next clue at the R-K Furniture Shop, from which they had to transport two handcrafted wooden beds to Kumbali Village and then carry the beds to the Pit Stop. They were allowed to ask the shop owner to call a truck for them. Teams used the beds to spend the night at the village.

Additional note

- This was a non-elimination leg.

=== Leg 7 (Malawi) ===
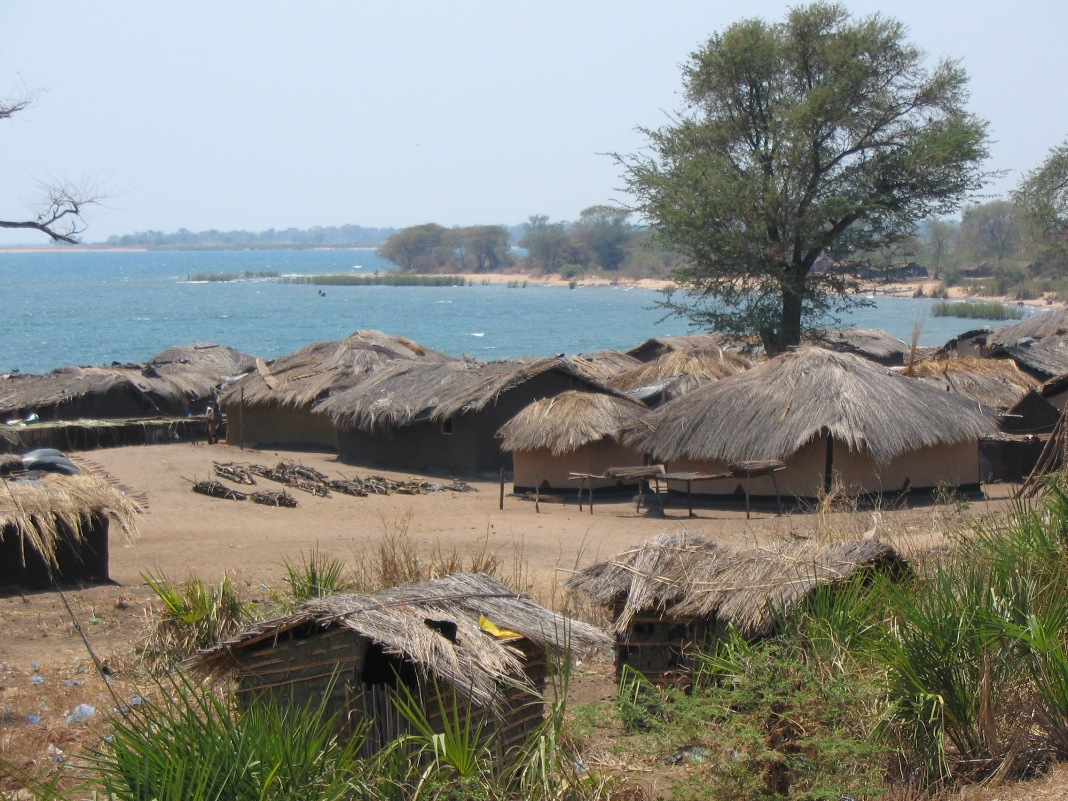
The Detour for the second leg in Malawi focused on tasks at Lake Malawi.

- Episode 7: "Move Goat" (November 6, 2011)
- Prize: US$15,000 (awarded to Andy & Tommy)
- Eliminated: Justin & Jennifer

Locations

- Lilongwe (Kumbali Village)
- Lilongwe → Salima (Salima Bus Station)
- Chigumukile Village (Lake Malawi)
- Chigumukile Village (Jamaica Shop)
- Senga Bay (Sunbird Livingstonia Beach)

Episode summary

- At the start of this leg, teams were instructed to travel by bus to Salima.
- For their Speed Bump, Amani & Marcus had to solve a sliding puzzle that depicted the flag of Malawi before they could continue racing.
- In this leg's Roadblock, one team member had to use a bicycle taxi known as a kabaza to take a customer carrying fish to one of three different destinations written on a board tied to the fish. After they dropped off their customer at their required address, they headed back to the bus station to trade their earnings of MK100 (roughly $0.66) for their next clue.
- This leg's Detour on Lake Malawi was a choice between Dugout or Lugout. In Dugout, teams had to participate in the annual Lake Malawi Dugout Canoe Race and use a traditional canoe to paddle out to drummers on the lake before paddling back to shore in order to receive their clue. In Lugout, teams had to wade to a ferryboat on the lake and unload passengers and cargo by carrying them ashore. Once they unloaded all of the cargo and passengers, they received their clue. Ernie & Cindy used their Express Pass to bypass this Detour.
- After the Detour, teams had to travel to the Jamaica Shop in Chigumukile Village, where they found their next clue directing them to the Pit Stop: Sunbird Livingstonia Beach at Senga Bay.

Additional note

- Laurence & Zac attempted to use the U-Turn on Amani & Marcus. However, Amani & Marcus had already passed the U-Turn by this point and were therefore unaffected.

=== Leg 8 (Malawi → Denmark) ===
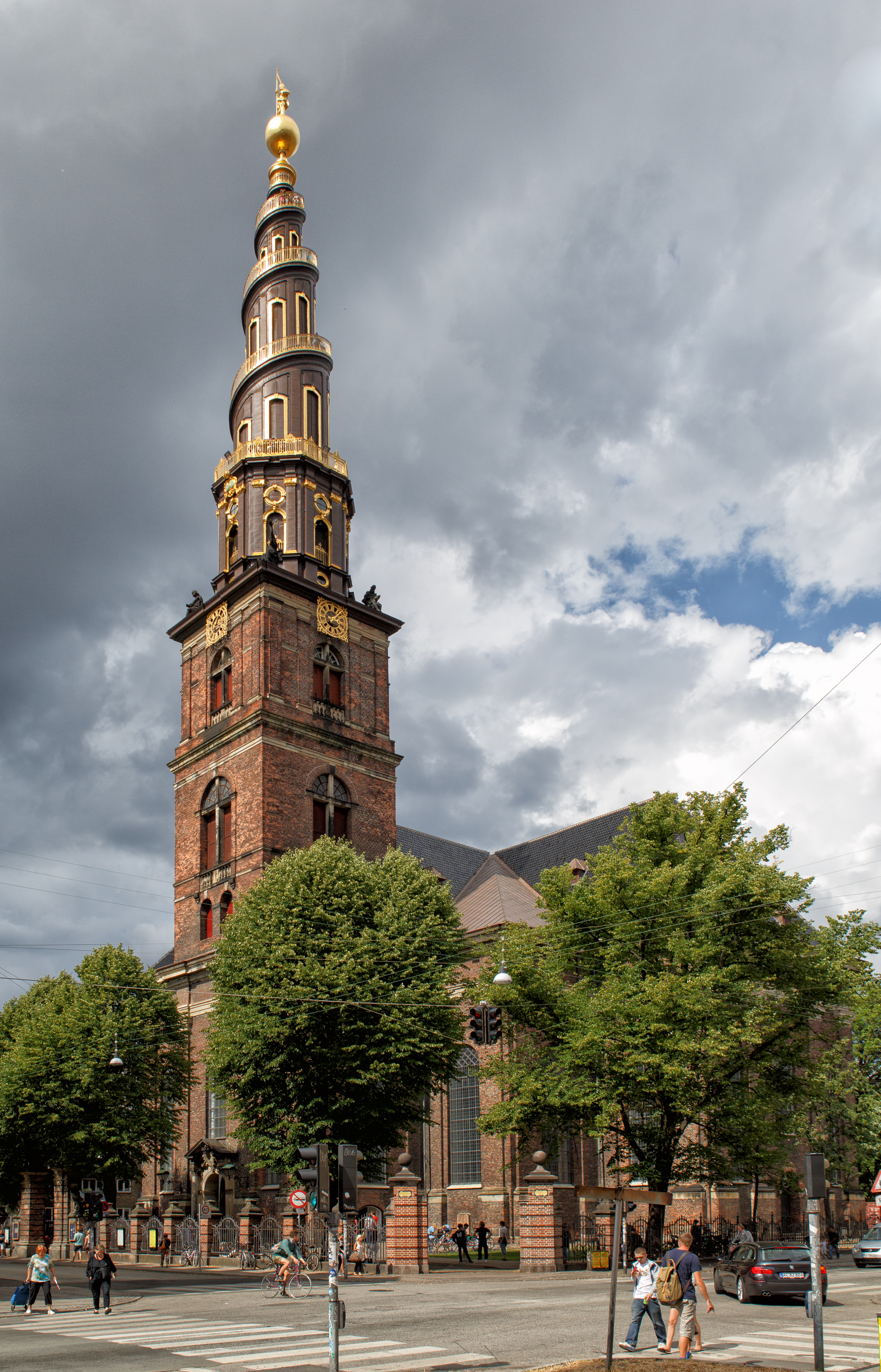
After arriving in Copenhagen, teams had to climb to the top of the Church of Our Saviour's tower in order to search for their next clue.

- Episode 8: "Super Shady" (November 13, 2011)
- Prize: A trip to Fiji (awarded to Ernie & Cindy)
- Eliminated: Laurence & Zac

Locations

- Senga Bay (Sunbird Livingstonia Beach)
- Lilongwe → Copenhagen, Denmark
- Copenhagen (Church of Our Saviour)
- Hillerød (Frederiksborg Slot)
- Kongens Lyngby (Frilandsmuseet)
- Kongens Lyngby (Karlstrup Windmill)
- Copenhagen (Larsens Plads – Havet Sailing Ship)

Episode summary

- At the start of this leg, teams were instructed to fly to Copenhagen, Denmark. Once there, teams had to drive to the Church of Our Saviour, where they had to climb to the top of the church and search for two clues on the top of the tower. The first was a flag on the tower that said Borg Slot and the other was a banner on a nearby building that said Frederiks. These led teams to their next location: Frederiksborg Slot in Hillerød.
- In this leg's Roadblock, one team member had to don Renaissance period clothing and perform a complex three-part Renaissance dance to the satisfaction of a countess in order to receive their next clue.
- After the Roadblock, teams had to drive to the Frilandsmuseet, where they found their next clue.
- This leg's Detour was a choice between All Hopped Up or All Churned Out. In All Hopped Up, teams had to lay out a proper rabbit show jumping course. They then had to pick a rabbit and each team member had to run it through the course without knocking over any of the obstacles in order to receive their next clue. In All Churned Out, teams had to use a traditional butter churn to churn fresh cream into butter and then cleanly stamp out six sticks of butter using a special mold in order to receive their next clue.
- After the Detour, teams had to travel to the Karlstrup Windmill in Kongens Lyngby in order to find their next clue, which directed them to the Pit Stop: the Havet, a sailing ship docked at Larsens Plads in Copenhagen.

Additional note

- This leg featured a Double U-Turn. Ernie & Cindy chose to use the U-Turn on Bill & Cathi, while Bill & Cathi chose to use the U-Turn on Laurence & Zac.

=== Leg 9 (Denmark → Germany → Belgium) ===
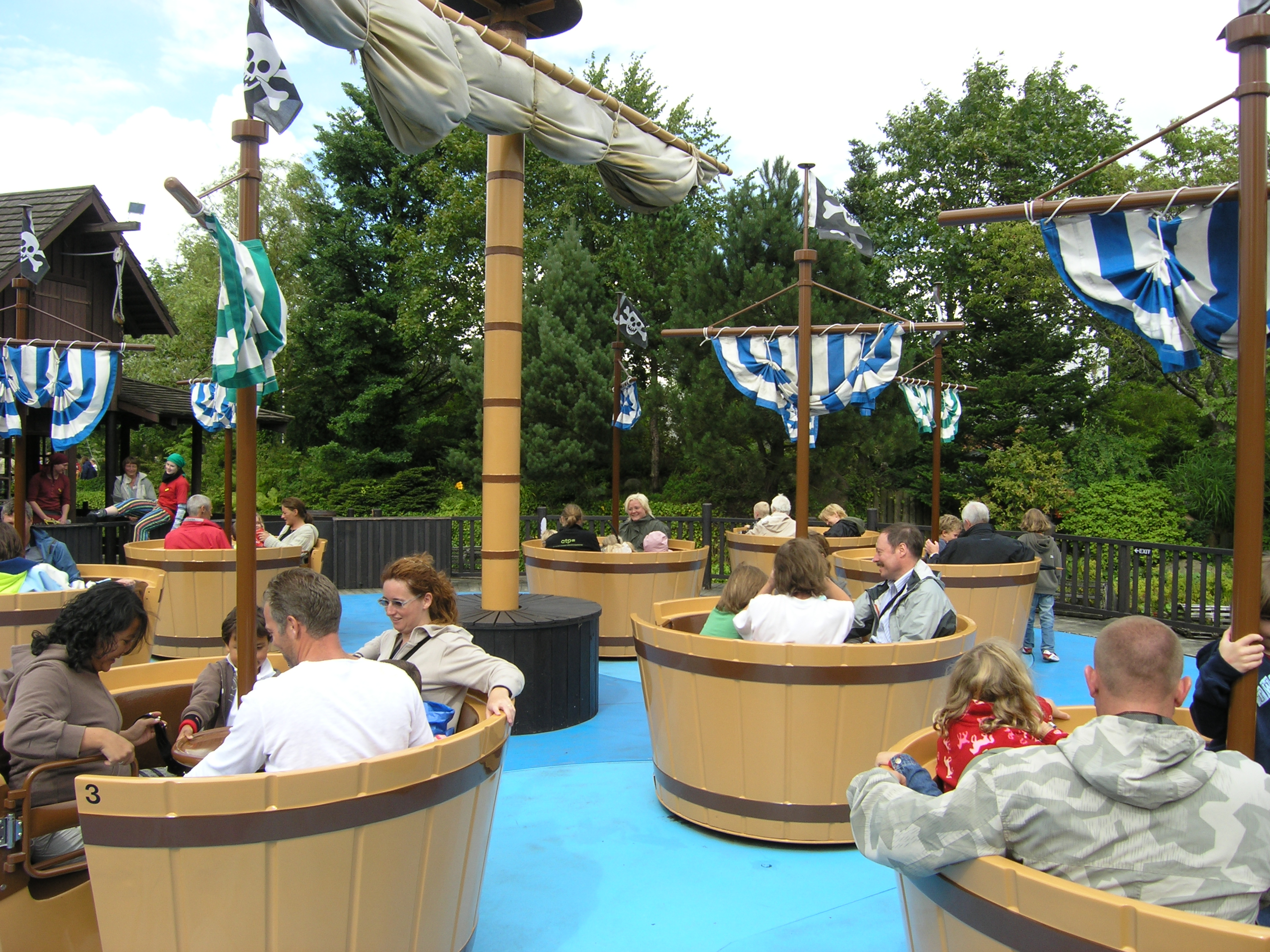
Teams visited Legoland Billund where they rode the Pirate Carousel teacups while building their next clue out of Lego bricks.

- Episode 9: "It's Speedo Time" (November 20, 2011)
- Prize: A trip to Panama (awarded to Amani & Marcus)

Locations

- Copenhagen (Larsens Plads – Havet Sailing Ship)
- Copenhagen (Andersens Boulevard – Statue of Hans Christian Andersen & Teatermuseet i Hofteatret)
- Billund (Legoland Billund)
- Hamburg, Germany (Hamburg Hauptbahnhof) → Brussels, Belgium
- Brussels (European Parliament Building)
- Brussels (Concert Noble)
- Brussels (Parc Élisabeth)

Episode summary

- At the start of this leg, teams had locate the Statue of Hans Christian Andersen in Copenhagen, where they found their next clue.
- In this leg's Roadblock, one team member had to memorize a poem on the base of the statue of and then use a map on a provided bicycle's wheel to navigate to the Teatermuseet i Hofteatret, where they had to recite the poem verbatim and with dramatic flair in order to receive their next clue. If they failed, they had to go back to the statue before returning to the theater to try again.
- After the Roadblock, teams had to drive to Legoland Billund and find the Pirate Carousel, where they received a box of Lego bricks. While on the ride and when it was in motion, teams had to assemble the puzzle, which revealed their next destination: the Hamburg Hauptbahnhof in Hamburg, Germany. Teams had to drive to the train station in order to find their next clue, which instructed them to travel by train to Brussels, Belgium. Once there, teams had to travel to the European Parliament Building, where they found their next clue.
- At Concert Noble, teams had to compete in a bodybuilding competition in honor of Jean-Claude Van Damme. Racers had to put on bikinis, cover their bodies with posing oil, and then learn a series of bodybuilding poses. Teams had to perform the routine in front of three judges and earn a score of at least twelve points in order to receive their next clue.
- Teams had to check in at the Pit Stop: Parc Élisabeth.

Additional notes

- The bodybuilding task was one option from a Detour and was titled Bodybuilding Posedown, but was not presented as such in the episode.
- There was no rest period at the end of this leg, and all teams were instead instructed to continue racing.

=== Leg 10 (Belgium) ===
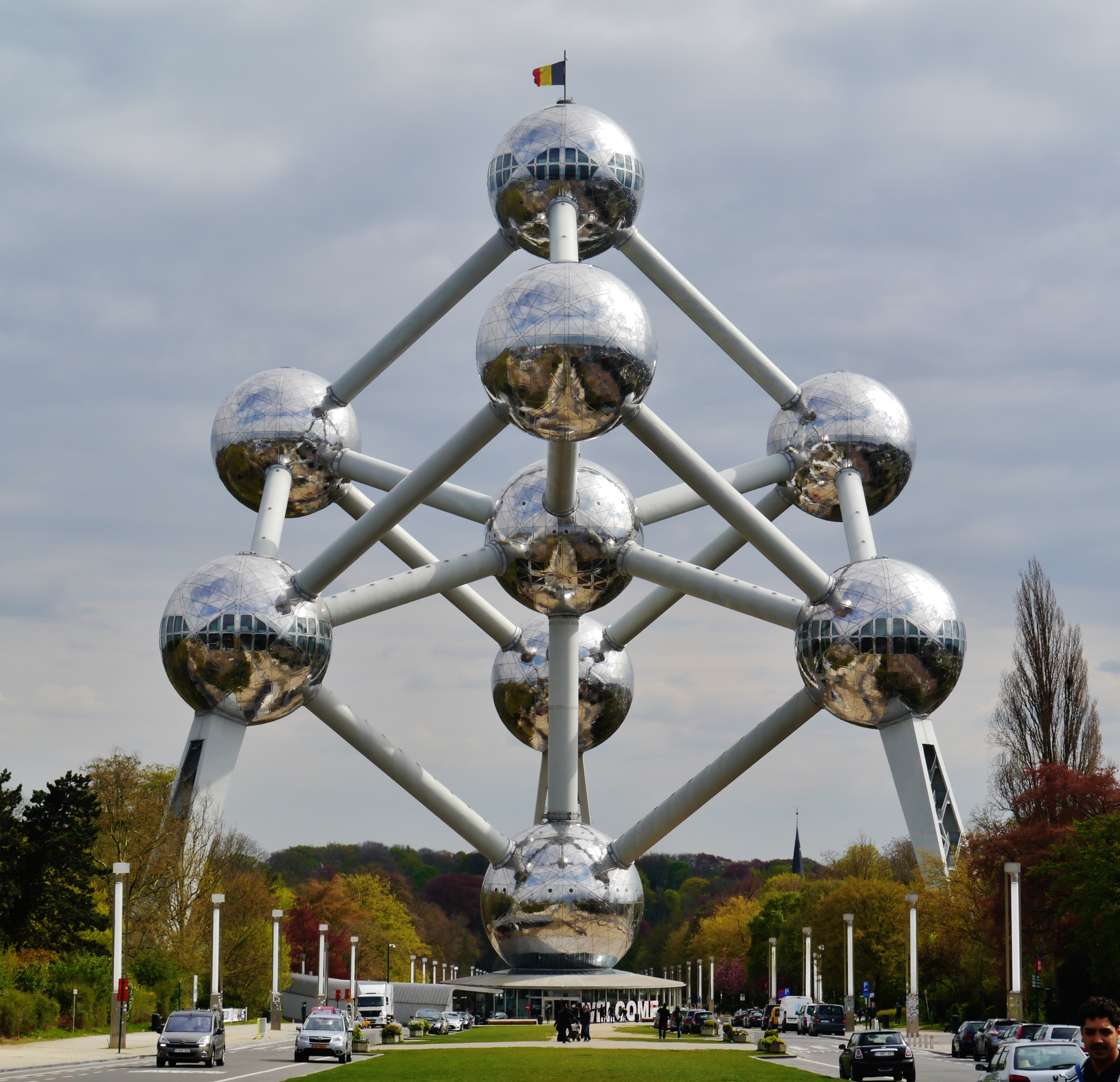
Teams ended their second leg in Belgium at the Atomium in Brussels.

- Episode 10: "Release the Brake!" (November 27, 2011)
- Prize: A Ford Mustang for each team member (awarded to Andy & Tommy)
- Eliminated: Bill & Cathi

Locations

- Lommel (Ford Proving Grounds)
- Ghent (Hoofdbrug)
- Ghent (Hoefslagstraatje & Leie River or Dulle Griet)
- Geraardsbergen (Muur van Geraardsbergen)
- Beersel (Steenweg op Ukkel 75 or Stoofstraat 52)
- Brussels (Atomium)

Episode summary

- At the start of this leg, teams had to drive themselves to the Ford Proving Grounds in Lommel, which had their next clue.
- In this leg's Roadblock, one team member had to test drive a Ford Mustang. They first had to accelerate to 100 mph (160 km/h) and then brake at a designated spot. They then had to navigate a slalom course within sixteen seconds without hitting a cone and stop inside a marked spot. Lastly, they finished by performing two victory doughnuts before receiving their next clue.
- After the Roadblock, teams had to drive to the Hoofdbrug in Ghent and find their next clue.
- This leg's Detour was a choice between Water or Waffle. In Water, teams had to use provided materials to build a raft and search the Leie River for the two halves of their next clue. In Waffle, teams had to build a waffle stand and then bake and decorate eighteen Belgian waffles to the chef's satisfaction before receiving their next clue.
- After the Detour, teams had to drive to the Muur van Geraardsbergen, where they released a flock of homing pigeons and were then given an address where the pigeons were flying. Once there, teams could retrieve their next clue from one of the pigeons – a picture of the Atomium – which teams had to identify in order to find the Pit Stop.

=== Leg 11 (Belgium → Netherlands → Panama) ===
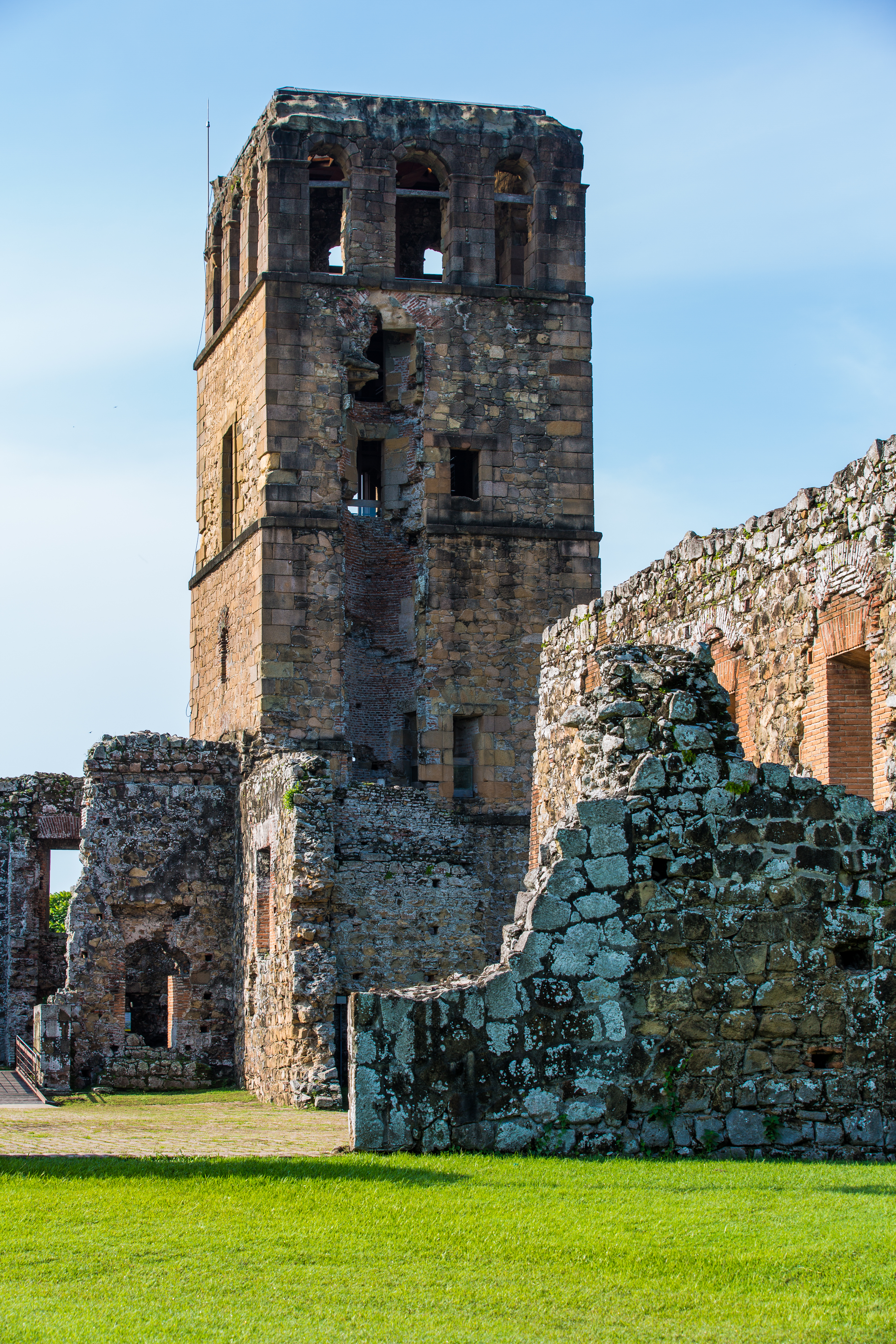
The ruins of Panamá Viejo in Panama City served as the Pit Stop on this penultimate leg.

- Episode 11: "We Are Charlie Chaplin" (December 4, 2011)
- Prize: A trip to the Turks and Caicos Islands (awarded to Jeremy & Sandy)
- Eliminated: Andy & Tommy

Locations

- Brussels (Atomium)
- Brussels (Rue de l'Étuve – The Adventures of Tintin Mural)
- Brussels → Amsterdam, Netherlands
- Amsterdam → Panama City, Panama
- Chagres National Park (Puerto El Corotu & Parara Puru)
- Panama City (San Francisco – San Francisco Bay Towers)
- Panama City (Plaza de Francia – Ferdinand de Lesseps Statue)
- Panama City (El Mercado de Mariscos or Salsipuedes Market)
- Panama City (Cathedral Square)
- Panama City (Panamá Viejo)

Episode summary

- At the start of this leg, teams had to dress up as the two detectives from the Belgian The Adventures of Tintin comic, and had to figure out one of the three names by which the characters are known in Belgium. Then, using a photo given to them with the clue, teams had to find a man dressed as Tintin standing in front of a Tintin mural and tell him any variation of the characters' names in order to receive their next clue. Teams were instructed to travel by train to Amsterdam, Netherlands, and then fly to Panama City, Panama. Once there, teams had to travel by boat to Parara Puru and sign up for one of four times the next morning to receive a temporary tattoo, which revealed their next location: the San Francisco Bay Towers in San Francisco.
- In this leg's Roadblock, one team member had to cross a 65-foot (20 m) tightrope between the 35-story towers, pick up their clue from the other tower, and then cross back to the first tower.
- After the Roadblock, teams were given a riddle – "Success in Suez led him to Panama. His failure inspired others to succeed. Find him beneath a rooster and you'll find your next clue." – directing them to the statue of Ferdinand de Lesseps in the Plaza de Francia.
- This season's final Detour was a choice between Filet or Sole. In Filet, teams traveled to Panama's largest fish market, where they had to deliver fish to different stalls throughout the market. Each stall only accepted a certain kind of fish up to a certain weight. Once they were done with their deliveries, they received their next clue. In Sole, teams traveled to the Salsipuedes Market, where they had to find a sandal stall and use one piece of leather each to make the sole and strapping for a pair of sandals in order to receive their next clue.
- After the Detour, teams had to travel to Cathedral Square, where they had to search through a group of tamborito dancers wearing pollera dresses for the location of the Pit Stop – Panamá Viejo – which was etched on the dancers' necklaces and written on one dancer's dress.

=== Leg 12 (Panama → United States) ===
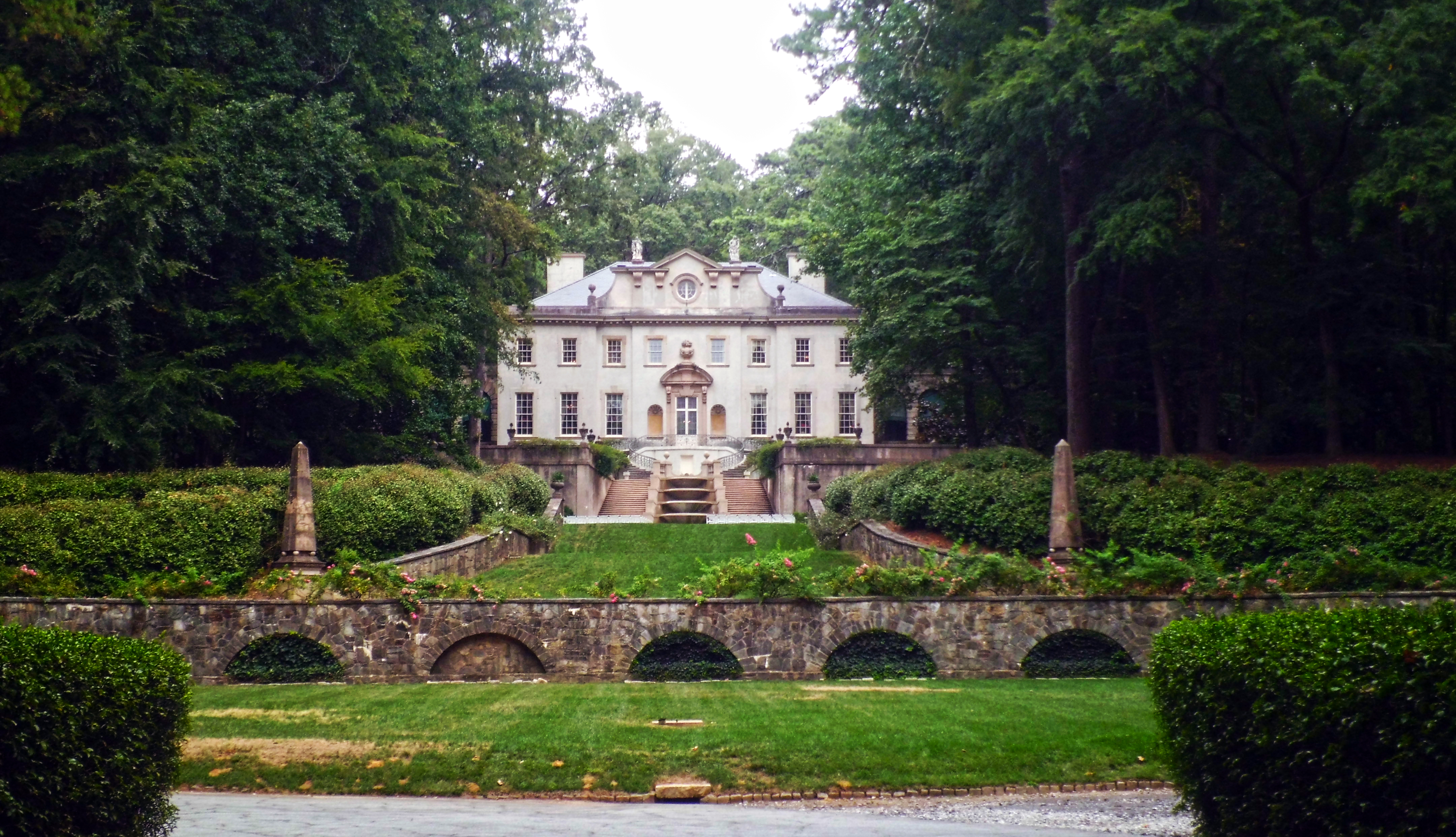
Atlanta's historic Swan House was the finish line for the 19th season of The Amazing Race.

- Episode 12: "Go Out and Get It Done" (December 11, 2011)
- Prize: US$1,000,000
- Winners: Ernie & Cindy
- Runners-up: Jeremy & Sandy
- Third place: Amani & Marcus

Locations

- Panama City (Panamá Viejo)
- Panama City → Atlanta, Georgia
- Atlanta (FlightSafety International)
- Atlanta (Margaret Mitchell House)
- Atlanta (Turner Field)
- Atlanta (Swan House)

Episode summary

- At the start of this leg, teams were instructed to fly to Atlanta, Georgia. Once there, teams had to travel to FlightSafety International and find their next clue. There, teams had to select a flight instructor, who taught them how to operate a Learjet flight simulator, and then successfully complete a simulated landing at Hartsfield–Jackson Atlanta International Airport from an altitude of 2,500 feet (760 m) to receive their next clue. Teams were then instructed to find their next clue at "the former residence known as The Dump", which they had to figure out was the former home of Margaret Mitchell, author of Gone with the Wind.
- In this season's final Roadblock, one team member had to type out their next clue using a vintage Remington 3 typewriter, duplicating an example message perfectly. Additionally, as the typewriters did not have a key for the number 1, they had to figure out that they could use the lower-case letter l as a substitute.
- After the Roadblock, teams had to figure out that the three numbers on the clue referenced Hank Aaron: 44 (his uniform number), 715 (the number of home runs he hit to break the Major League Baseball home run record) and 74 (the year in which he broke the record). Teams then had to go to Turner Field, where one team member had to loop a rope through a series of carabiners, each representing a specific country on a large unlabeled vertical map, and map out the racecourse while their teammate gave help from the ground below. Once they had the correct course, teams received their final clue, which directed them to the finish line: Swan House.

== Reception ==
=== Critical response ===
The Amazing Race 19 received mixed reviews. Andy Dehnart of reality blurred wrote that this season was "yet another example of the race dumbing itself down." Scott Von Doviak of The A.V. Club wrote that he'd "have to rank this as one of the lesser seasons, probably in the bottom third. Too many lackluster teams and tasks, too many non-elimination legs, and the absence of any compelling heroes and villains all added to a rather disappointing trip around the globe." Daniel Fienberg of HitFix wrote that the season "left me frustrated more often than it left me exhilarated" calling it lackluster due to "Too many Non-Elimination Legs too early. Too many bland, copacetic couples. Too many bland, copacetic couples who, predictably, got along too well." Daron Aldridge of Box Office Prophets wrote "I feel like none of us won this season". Luke Dwyer of TV Fanatic graded this season with a B saying "the majority of the legs and destinations were good, but not great. The cast was likable, but beyond Andy and Tommy, nothing spectacular. The finale was a dud and that's always going to bring the feel of the season down." Michael Hewitt of the Orange County Register wrote that "the Race had been losing a bit of its mojo for several seasons, hitting bottom with the spring's Second Chances edition. This fall's 19th Race was much improved, though, and it remains the most brilliantly shot and edited show on TV" and that this season had "a few more challenging challenges and the clues often required some solving on the parts of the contestants." In 2016, this season was ranked 17th out of the first 27 seasons by the Rob Has a Podcast Amazing Race correspondents. Kareem Gantt of Screen Rant wrote that this season "had some legs that kind of underwhelmed, but overall, the drama and suspense of the race trumped the season's shortcomings, which were rather minute, to be honest." In 2021, Jane Andrews of Gossip Cop ranked this season as the show's 8th best season. Val Barone of TheThings ranked this season as the show's 8th best season. In 2022, Jason Shomer of Collider ranked this season among the show's top seven seasons. In 2022, Rhenn Taguiam of Game Rant ranked this season as the fourth-best season. In 2024, Taguiam's ranking was updated with this season becoming the sixth-best season.

=== Ratings ===
U.S. Nielsen ratings

#	Airdate	Episode	Rating	Share	Rating/Share	Viewers	Rank	Rank	Rank	Rank
#	Airdate	Episode	Households		18–49	(millions)	Timeslot (Viewers)	Timeslot (18–49)	Week (Viewers)	Week (18–49)
1	September 25, 2011	"Kindness of Strangers"	6.1	9	3.0/07	10.18	2	3	<#25	<#25
2	October 2, 2011	"The Sprint of Our Life"	6.4	10	3.2/07	10.87	2	2	24	24
3	October 9, 2011	"Don't Lay Down on Me Now!"	6.7	10	2.8/07	9.62	2	2	<25	<25
4	October 16, 2011	"This Is Gonna Be a Fine Mess"	5.5	8	2.7/06	9.21	2	3	<30	<25
5	October 23, 2011	"I Feel Like I'm in the Circus"	5.9	9	2.7/07	9.60	4	4	<30	<25
6	October 30, 2011	"We Love Your Country Already; It Is Very Spacious"	6.8	10	3.0/07	11.01	2	3	24	<25
7	November 6, 2011	"Move Goat"	6.0	9	2.7/06	9.73	3	4	<25	<25
8	November 13, 2011	"Super Shady"	6.1	9	2.7/06	10.27	3	4	25	<25
9	November 20, 2011	"It's Speedo Time"	6.1	9	2.8/07	10.24	3	3	27	<25
10	November 27, 2011	"Release the Brake!"	6.0	9	2.9/06	10.15	2	2	18	17
11	December 4, 2011	"We Are Charlie Chaplin"	5.7	8	2.7/06	9.59	3	3	22	23
12	December 11, 2011	"Go Out and Get It Done"	7.0	10	3.3/07	11.72	2	2	15	13

- Episode 9, "It's Speedo Time", went up against the 2011 American Music Awards.
- Episode 12, "Go Out and Get It Done", the season finale, began airing at 8:42pm ET due to an NFL Overrun and scored season highs in viewers and all demos.

Canadian ratings

Canadian broadcaster CTV also aired The Amazing Race on Sundays at 8:00 p.m. Eastern, Central, & Atlantic (9:00 p.m. Pacific & Mountain).

#	Airdate	Episode	Viewers (millions)	Rank (Week)
1	September 25, 2011	"Kindness of Strangers"	2.87	4
2	October 2, 2011	"The Sprint of Our Life"	2.48	2
3	October 9, 2011	"Don't Lay Down on Me Now!"	1.93	9
4	October 16, 2011	"This Is Gonna Be a Fine Mess"	2.68	2
5	October 23, 2011	"I Feel Like I'm in the Circus"	2.61	2
6	October 30, 2011	"We Love Your Country Already; It Is Very Spacious"	2.22	6
7	November 6, 2011	"Move Goat"	2.42	2
8	November 13, 2011	"Super Shady"	2.28	5
9	November 20, 2011	"It's Speedo Time"	1.88	10
10	November 27, 2011	"Release the Brake!"	2.24	6
11	December 4, 2011	"We Are Charlie Chaplin"	2.49	2
12	December 11, 2011	"Go Out and Get It Done"	2.49	3

- Episode 3, "Don't Lay Down on Me Now!", aired on the Sunday before Canadian Thanksgiving Day.
