= Phang Nga (disambiguation) =

Phang Nga (officially Phangnga) may refer to these places in Thailand:

- Phang Nga town
- Phang Nga Province
- Phang Nga district
- Phang Nga Bay
- Phang Nga River
