= Dajia Riverside Park =

Park in Zhongshan, Taipei, Taiwan

- 大佳河濱公園
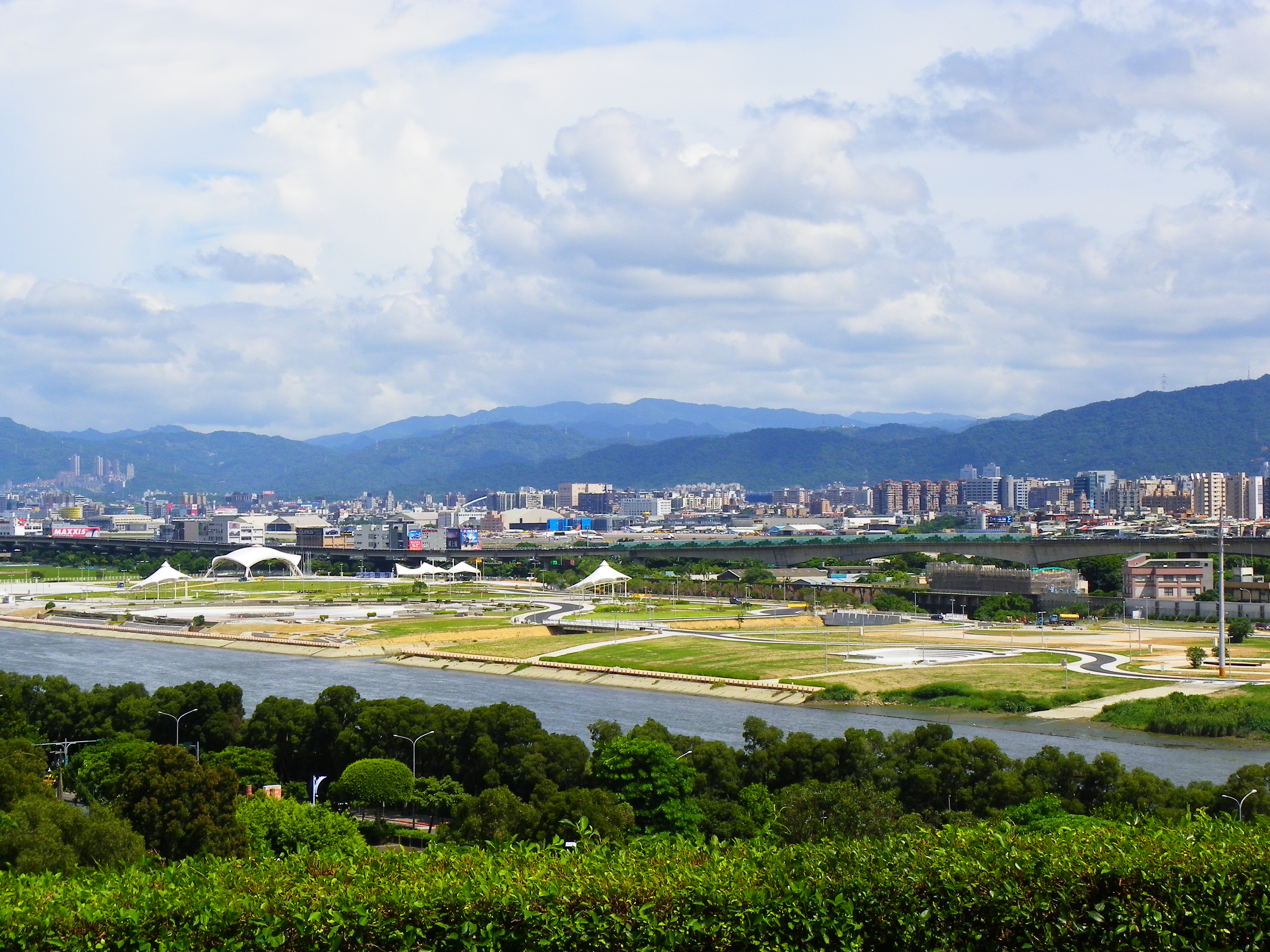
- Interactive map of Dajia Riverside Park
- Type: Park
- Location: Zhongshan, Taipei, Taiwan
- Nearest city: Taipei
- Coordinates: 25.076°N 121.535°E
- Area: 420,000 m^{2} (100 acres)
- Created: 1990
- Opened: 1990
- Owner: Taipei City Government
- Operator: Taipei City Government
- Open: All year
- Status: Open all year
- Water: Keelung River
- Parking: Provide
- Website: https://www.travel.taipei/zh-tw/attraction/details/251

The Dajia Riverside Park (Chinese: 大佳河濱公園; pinyin: Dàjiā Hébīn Gōngyuán) is a park located in Zhongshan District, Taipei, Taiwan.

Located between Zhongshan Bridge and Dazhi Bridge in Zhongshan District, Dajia Riverside Park is a metropolis-type greening park developed and constructed by the government. With a large area, it is a large expanse of vast grassland that enters the park. People can also look out at the Miramar Ferris wheel.

There is a large fountain with a diameter of 125 meters and central water column as high as 75 meters, and 80 sets of colorful underwater lights. It uses the visual changes of the water level to show its rhythmic characteristics. The fountain sprays water for half an hour at the hour. Near the entrance of No. 8 Water Gate, there is a square image with the shape of the Keelung River curved and straightened, lined with the rolling background of mountains and a floor inlaid with sculptures of different fishes, which symbolizes the renovation hardships of the Keelung River Bank. The northern bank of the Keelung River completed the greening landscape improvement project in February 2010. There are also sports parks, sports facilities such as basketball, five tennis courts, badminton courts, and cricket grounds, as well as several kilometers of bicycle paths around the park to roam along the Keelung River (bicycle rental is available at the entrance to the park). There were plenty of parking lots nearby to facilitate tourists driving by themselves. Due to the wide space, parking, and environment, Dajia Riverside Park regularly holds various large-scale activities in addition to many sporting events during the holiday seasons.

On May 28, 2009, the Summer Deaflympics Carnival was held locally. Starting from March 18, 2010, Dajia Riverside Park was temporarily closed for large-scale renovation work as one of the venues of the Taipei International Flower Expo 2010. It was completed on the eve of the Flower Expo on September 20, 2010 and large fireworks were held. The New Year’s Eve Party for the 100th anniversary of the founding of the Republic of China was also held here on the evening of December 31, 2010.

== History ==
The park is part of the greening project around the area. A water playground was opened at the park in June–September 2017.

In the 1990s, after completing the Keelung River curve-cutting and straightening project, the Taipei City Government rebuilt the park on the south bank of the Keelung River in the Dajia section, covering an area of about 420,000 square meters (106,600 ping), and connecting with Yingfeng Riverside Park to the east of the Dazhi Bridge. In addition to providing a large number of hydrophilic spaces for residents in Taipei, it also has the function of beautifying the water area. Three water gates at base 8, base 9, base 10 outside Binjiang Street are connected to the urban area.

== Geology ==
The park is located along the Keelung River. It features a fountain.

== Events ==
- Adidas Beijing Olympic Taiwan Run 2008
- Taipei International Flower Expo 2010
- Puma Ignite Taiwan Run 2010
- The New Year’s Eve Party for the 100th anniversary of the founding of the Republic of China 2010
- Puma Ignite Taiwan Run 2011
- Puma Ignite Taiwan Run 2012
- Run for Rich 2013
- The Color Run Taipei 2013
- Puma Ignite Taiwan Run 2013
- Puma Ignite Taiwan Run 2014
- Run for Rich 2014
- Road to Ultra: Taiwan 2015
- Puma Ignite Taiwan Run 2015
- Nike NRC Women's Half Marathon Taipei 2015
- Taipei Standard Chartered Marathon 2015
- Road to Ultra: Taiwan 2016
- Puma Ignite Taiwan Run 2016
- Nike NRC Women's Half Marathon Taipei 2016
- Taipei Dragon Boat Festival 2017
- Road to Ultra: Taiwan 2017
- World Music Festival 2017
- Sounds from the river 2017
- Taipei International Flora Exposition
- The Amazing Race 19
- 29th Love Forever Run 2017
- Puma Ignite Taiwan Run 2017
- Taipei Standard Chartered Marathon 2017
- Ultra Taiwan 2018
- Snoopy Run 2018
- Earth Day Run 2018
- Taipei Dragon Boat Festival 2018
- Taipei Starry Night Marathon 2018
- Puma Ignite Taiwan Run 2018
- 2018 TAISHIN women Run Taipei 2018
- Good Morning Taipei Ultra Half Marathon 2018
- Taipei Standard Chartered Marathon 2018
- Acardia Taiwan 2018
- Creamfields Taiwan 2018
- HARD Taiwan 2019

== Facilities ==
The park features facilities for cycling, skateboarding and rollerskating. There are five tennis courts, lighted, hard surface, free of charge, first come first serve. Bathrooms. Basketball, Badminton courts, and Cricket grounds.

== Transportation ==
The park is accessible within walking distance southwest Dazhi Station of Taipei Metro.

== See also ==
- List of parks in Taiwan
