= Ko Yao Yai =

Island in Phang Nga bay, Thailand

Coordinates: 8°00′08″N 98°34′08″E

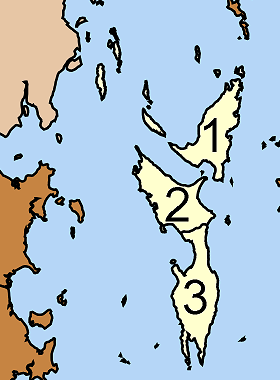
Map of Ko Yao sub-districts. Kao Yao Noi (1); Kao Yao Yai (2); Phru Nai (3)

Ko Yao Yai (Thai: เกาะยาวใหญ่) is the larger of the two big islands in the Ko Yao Archipelago. The island group is in Phang Nga Bay in the Phang Nga Province of southern Thailand. Ko Yao Yai means 'big long island'. The other main island of the group is Ko Yao Noi ('little long island'), off Ko Yao Yai's north side and separated from it by a narrow sound. The two islands form Phang Nga's Ko Yao District. The population of Ko Yao is about 18,000 (2018). Ninety percent are Muslims. The area of the archipelago is 147 km^{2}. It lies around 600 km south of Bangkok and about 50 km from Phuket or Phang Nga. Ko Yao Noi is more popular with visitors as it has more facilities.

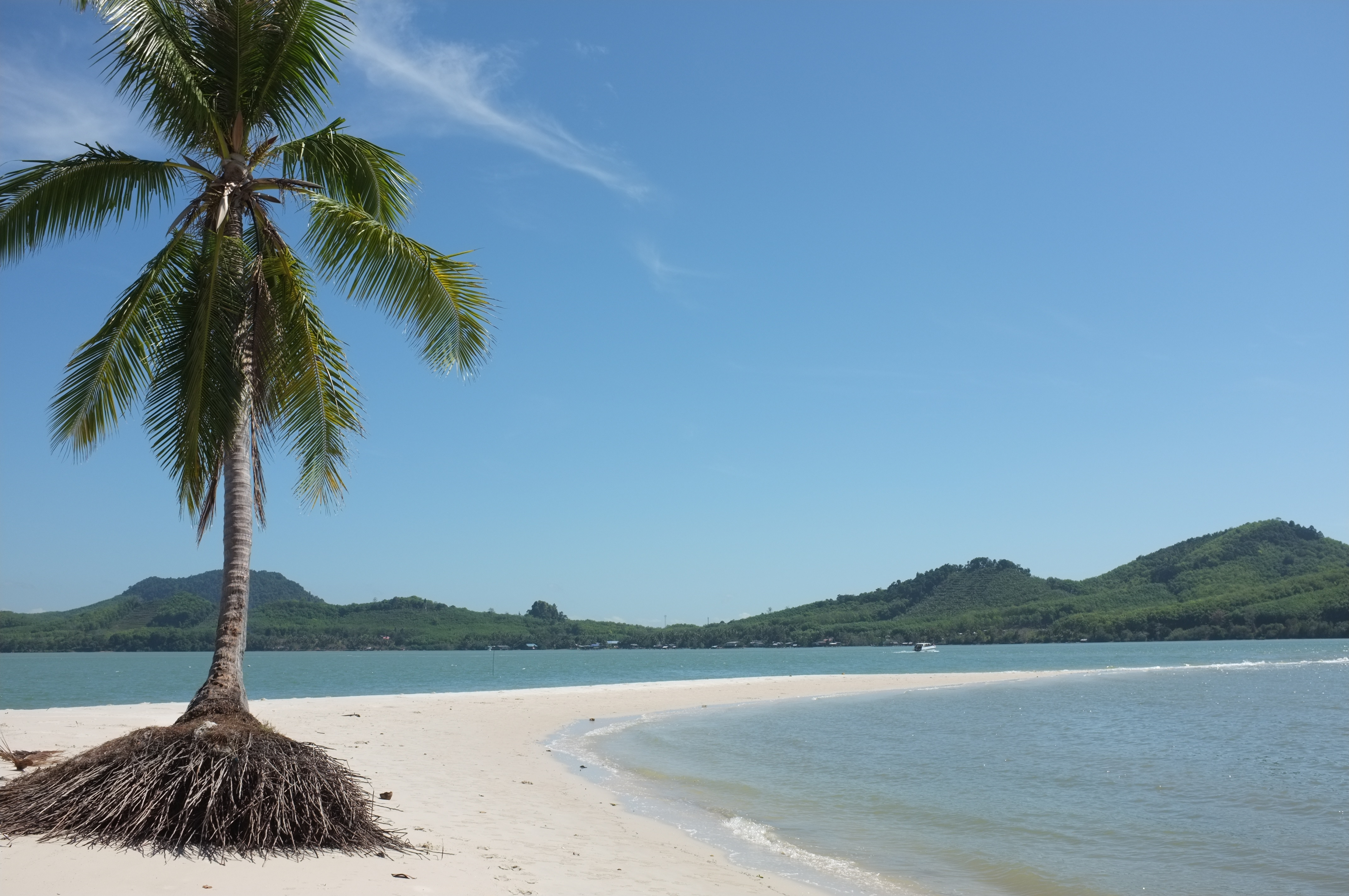
Ko Yao Yai Island

Legends say that the island of Ko Yao was split into two islands by battling sea serpents.
