= Ko Panyi =

Village in Phang Nga province, Thailand

Native name: เกาะปันหยี
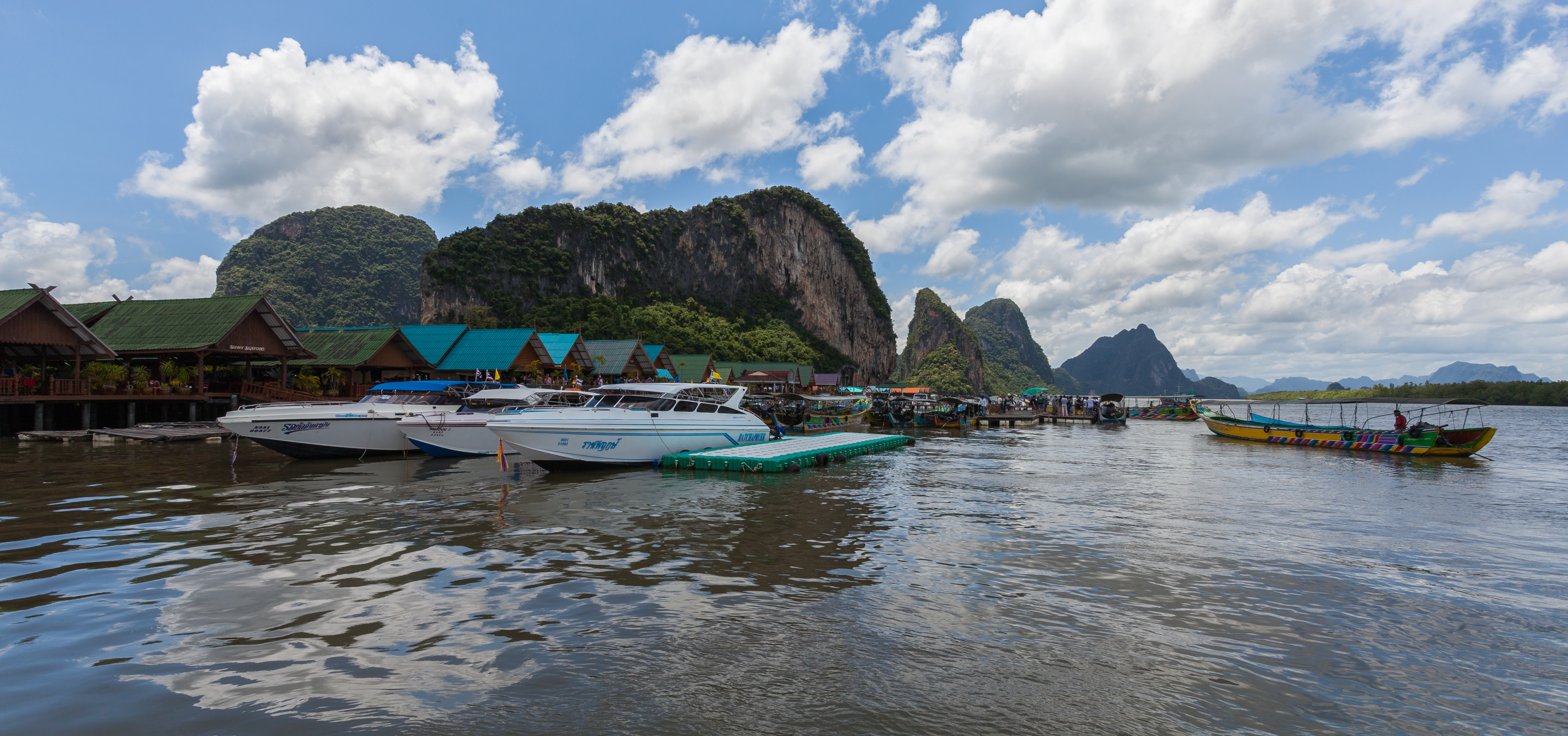
- Interactive map of Ko Panyi
- Other names: Koh Panyi, Koh Panyee

Geography
- Location: Strait of Malacca
- Coordinates: 8°20′8″N 98°30′11″E
- Area: 0.13 km^{2} (0.050 sq mi)

Administration
- Thailand
- Province: Phang Nga
- District: Mueang Phang Nga
- Tambon: Ko Panyi

Demographics
- Population: 1,600
- Languages: Central Thai, Southern Thai, Malay

Additional information
- Time zone: ICT (UTC+7)
- Postal code: 82000

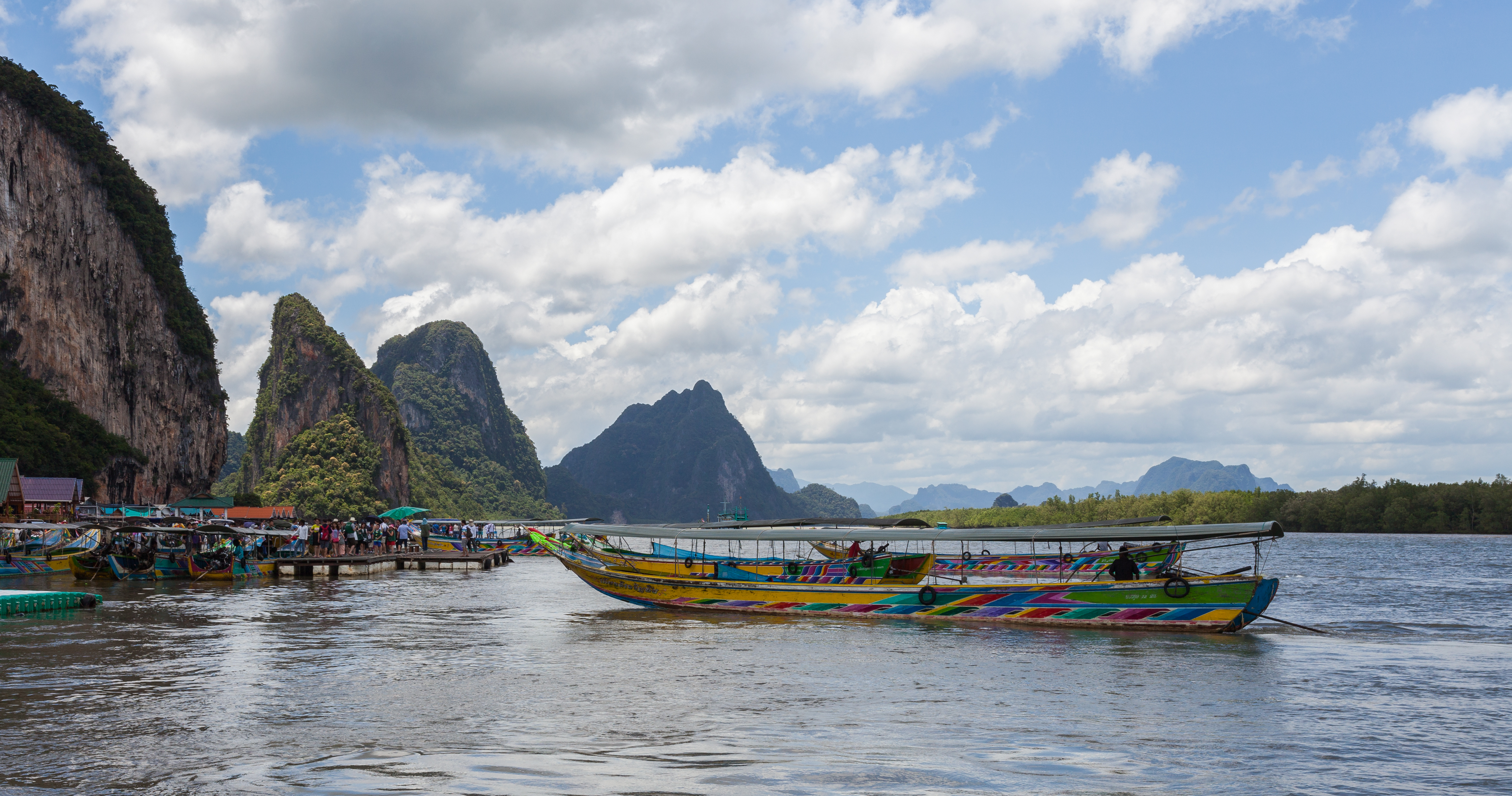
View of the island

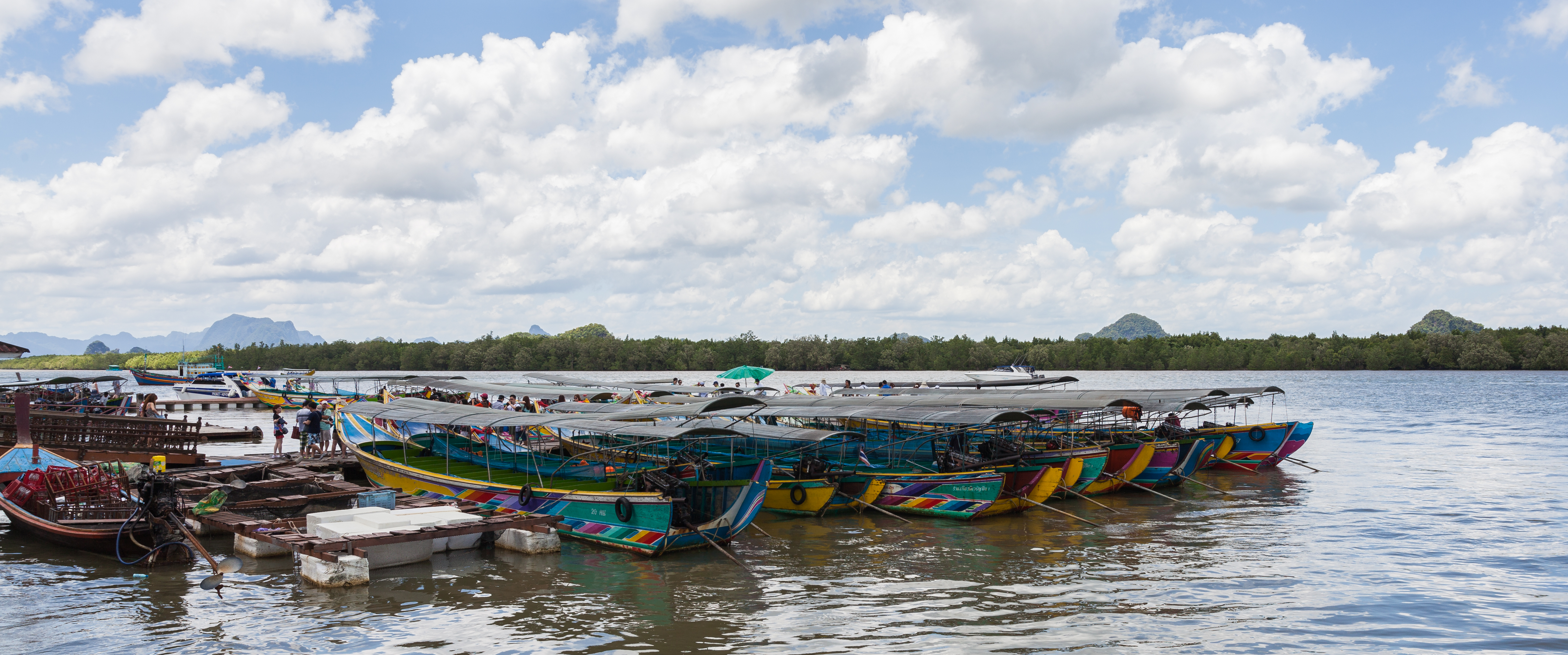
Pier

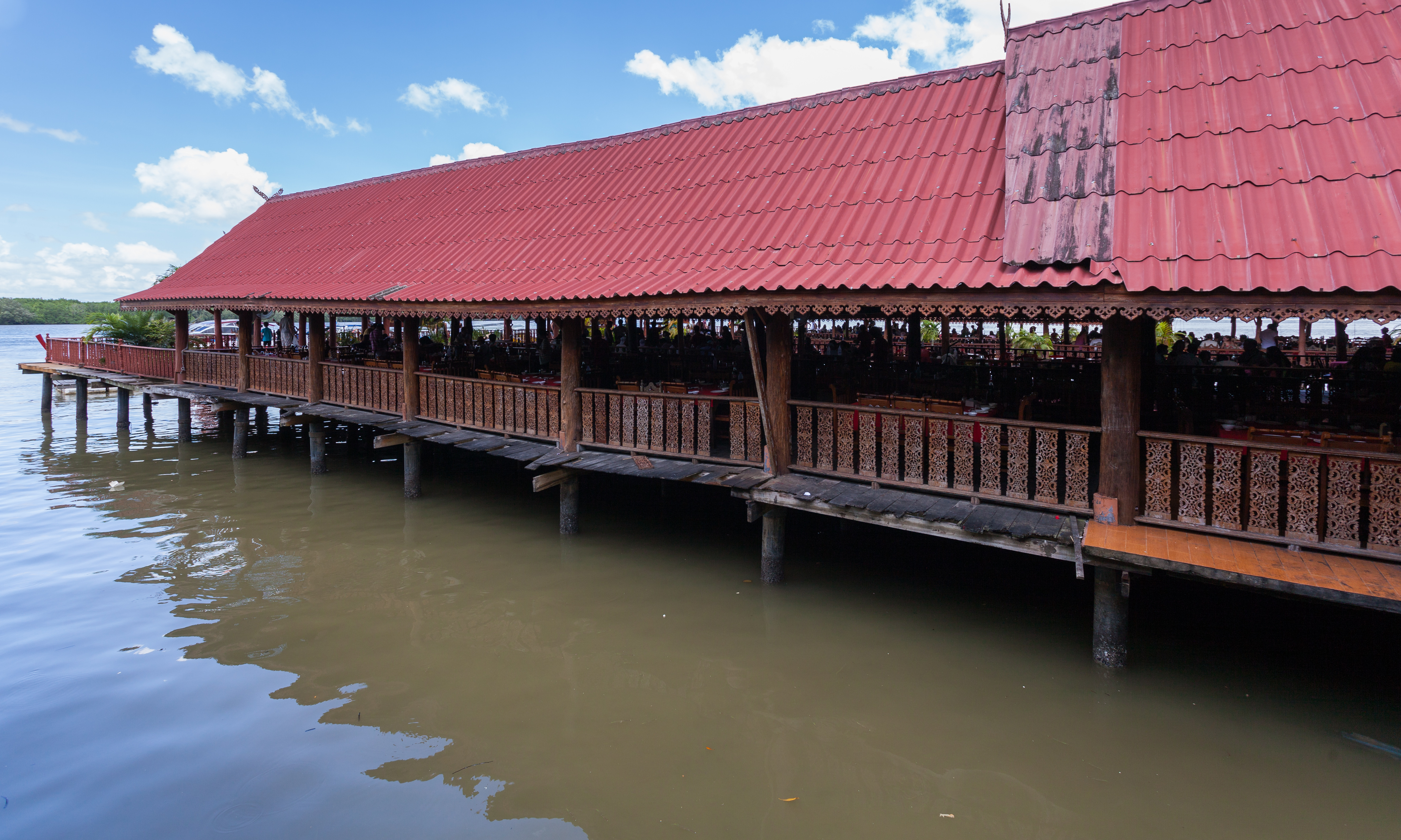
Restaurant over the water

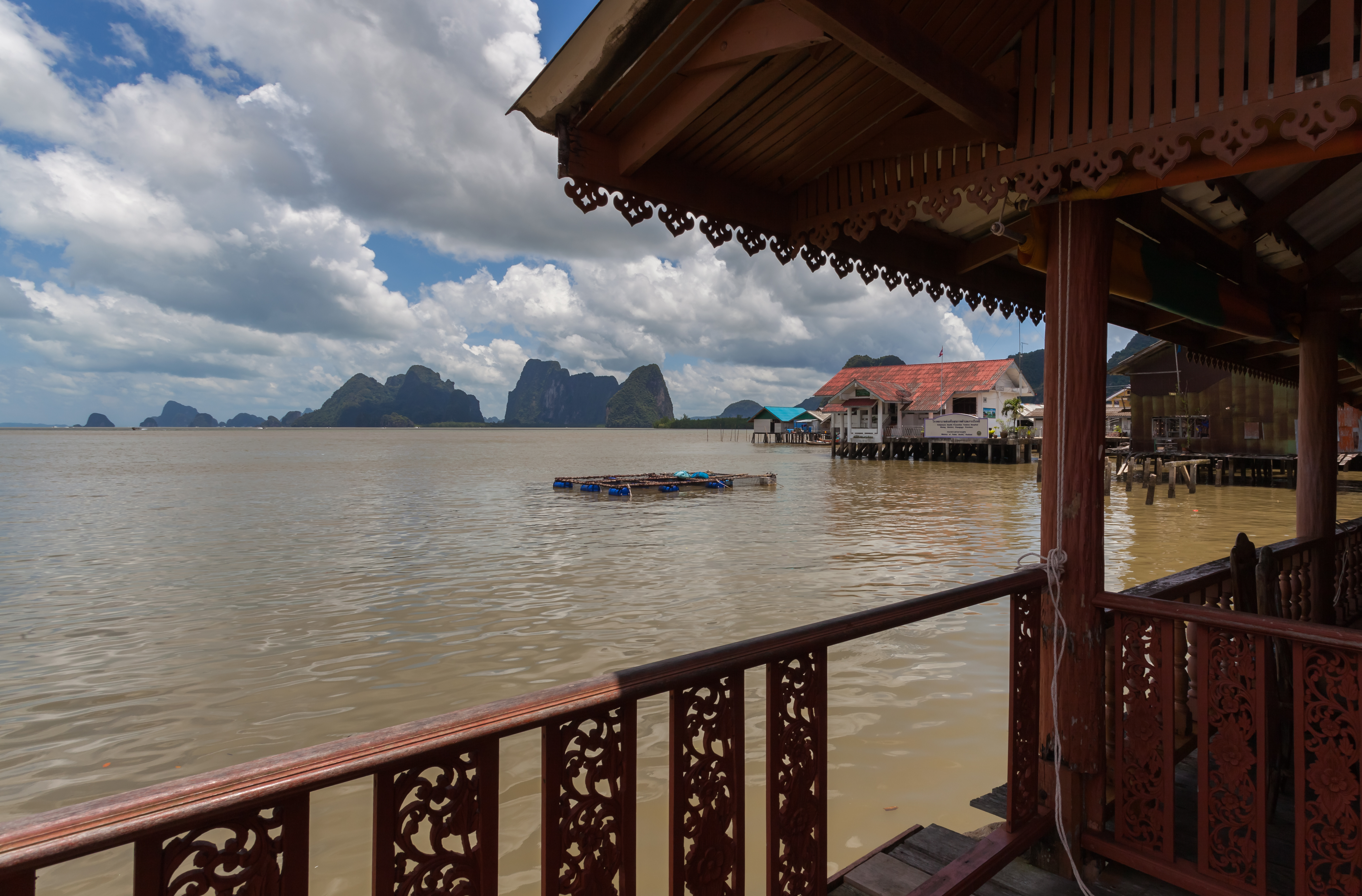
View from the island

Ko Panyi (Thai: เกาะปันหยี, pronounced [kɔ̀ʔ pān.jǐː]), also known as Koh Panyee, is a fishing village in Phang Nga Province, Thailand, notable for being built on stilts by Bugis fishermen. The population consists of about 360 families or 1,600 people descended from two seafaring Muslim families from Indonesia.

== History ==
Ko Panyi is known as Pulau Panji in Malay and Pulo Panji in Javanese. The settlement at Ko Panyi was established in 1880 by nomadic Javanese fisherman. During this time the law limited land ownership solely to people of Thai national origins, and due to this restriction the settlement was, for the most part, built on stilts within the protection of the island's bay, providing easy access for fishers. With the increase of wealth for the community, due to the growing tourism industry within Thailand, the purchase of land on the island itself became a possibility, and the first significant structures were built ashore, a mosque and a freshwater well.

=== Alternative interpretation of the founders' origins ===
Some commonly circulated accounts state that the founders of Ko Panyi were migrants from Java. However, local oral histories preserved by village elders and community leaders suggest that this interpretation may have arisen from a linguistic misunderstanding.

According to local explanations, the early settlers referred to themselves as "Jawi" or "Javee", a historical term used across the Malay world to describe Malay Muslim communities of the Nusantara region. In Thai usage, the term "Yawi" (ยาวี) has historically been used to refer to Malay-speaking Muslim populations associated with the cultural sphere of Patani.

Due to phonetic differences in Thai pronunciation, the word "Jawi" may be pronounced in ways that resemble "Cha-wee" or "Ja-wee". Some interpretations suggest that this pronunciation may have been misunderstood by external interviewers as referring to Java, which later led to the assumption that the founders were Javanese.

At present, there is no widely cited genetic, genealogical, or documentary evidence conclusively demonstrating that the founding population of Ko Panyi was ethnically Javanese. Cultural elements of the village, including maritime livelihood, settlement patterns built over water, and Malay Muslim customs, are also consistent with broader Malay maritime traditions historically present across the region. Asri

== Village life ==
The village has a Muslim school which is attended by both girls and boys in the mornings. Due to the informal nature of this education, many of the boys attend schools further afield in Phang Nga or in Phuket. Further emigration from the village is encouraged as the size of the settlement is restricted by dangerous water conditions in the rainy season.

A mosque based on the island adjacent to the settlement serves the predominantly Muslim population and is a focal point and meeting place for the community. A market stocked with goods from the mainland sells basic amenities such as medicine, clothes, and toiletries.

Despite the rise in tourism, life in Ko Panyi is still primarily based around the fishing industry as tourists only visit in significant numbers during the dry season.

The village includes a floating football pitch. Inspired by the 1986 FIFA World Cup, children built the pitch from old scraps of wood and fishing rafts. The boys decided to form a football team and compete in the Southern Thai School Championships. After making it to the semi-finals in an inland tournament, achieving third place despite strange circumstances (in the second half, they decided to play barefoot since they were used to that), all of the village were inspired to take up the sport. So a brand new pitch was built, although the wooden one remains and is popular among tourists. As of 2011, Panyee FC is one of the most successful youth soccer clubs in Southern Thailand. They have an impressive record of winning six South Thailand Youth Soccer Championships from 2004 to 2010.

A 2011 brand campaign for TMB Bank includes a short film that tells the team's story. The film is based on interviews with the original team, and it stars local children rebuilding the field on location.
