= M.R. Kukrit's House =

Museum in Bangkok, Thailand

Coordinates: 13°43′13″N 100°31′59″E

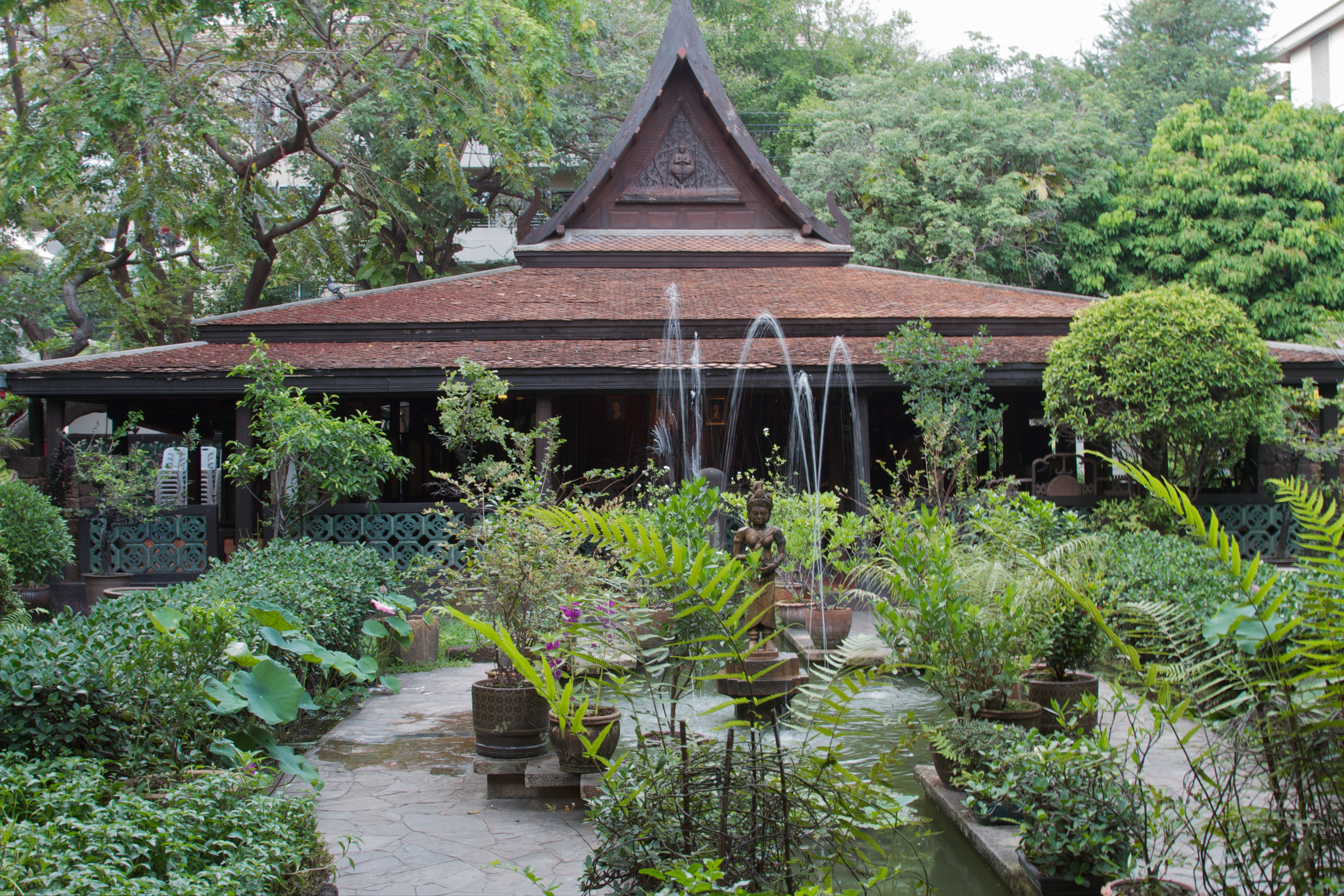
M.R. Kukrit's Heritage Home

M.R. Kukrit's House is a heritage museum on South Sathon Road in downtown Bangkok, Thailand, dedicated to the former Prime Minister of Thailand Kukrit Pramoj (1911–1995).

It consists of five teak houses. The reception hall was used for public purposes (receptions and banquets) and for religious ceremonies. A raised platform in the center was designed for performing traditional Thai Khon dance, with ornate masks for the dancers displayed on the shelves.

The homes contain artifacts, such as a Chinese altar given by Deng Xiaoping as a gift and old Buddhist scriptures.

As a traditional Thai home, the garden plays a key role in the design of Kukrit's house. Two low walls on either side of the garden connect the main hall in front to the houses in the rear of the property.

In the dining area, two vases are displayed, gifts to Kukrit from Mao Zedong of China. There are many tributes displaying the late prime minister's affection for dogs, including paintings.

Left of the reception room are the living, reading and music rooms; on the right, a room which is used as a shrine for Buddhist prayer.

== In popular culture ==
The House served as the fifth Pit Stop in The Amazing Race 19.
