= Andy Finch =

American snowboarder (born 1981)

- Born: Andrew Joseph Finch; March 20, 1981 (age 45); Fresno, California, U.S.
- Occupation: Snowboarder
- Television: The Amazing Race 19 (4th place)

Andrew Joseph Finch (born March 20, 1981) is an American snowboarder. His accomplishments include winning the overall U.S. Grand Prix Halfpipe Title in 2003 and 2004, taking first place in the Arctic Challenge in Norway in April 2004, winning the Vans Triple Crown in February 2004, winning the O'Neill Snowboard Jam in January 2005, and finishing in second place in Northstar Resort's Vans Tahoe Cup. In addition, Finch competed in the 2006 Winter Olympics for the United States. He lives in Truckee, California and attended Bullard High School in Fresno, California.

Finch and his friend Tommy Czeschin participated on the 19th season of The Amazing Race. They ended up in 4th place out of 11 teams and were the eighth team eliminated in Casco Viejo, Panama. He and Tommy are one of the few teams who won 6 out of 12 legs on The Amazing Race 19.
