= Tommy Czeschin =

American snowboarder (born 1979)

Personal information
- Born: June 15, 1979 (age 47) Mammoth Lakes, California, United States

Sport
- Sport: Snowboarding

Tommy Czeschin (born June 15, 1979) is an American snowboarder. He competed in the men's halfpipe event at the 2002 Winter Olympics.

Czeschin and his friend Andy Finch participated on the 19th season of The Amazing Race. They ended up in 4th place out of 11 teams and were the eighth team eliminated after finishing last at Panamá Viejo in Panama City. He and Andy won six out of twelve legs on The Amazing Race 19.
