= Execution Bridge, Ghent =

Execution/Decapitation Bridge
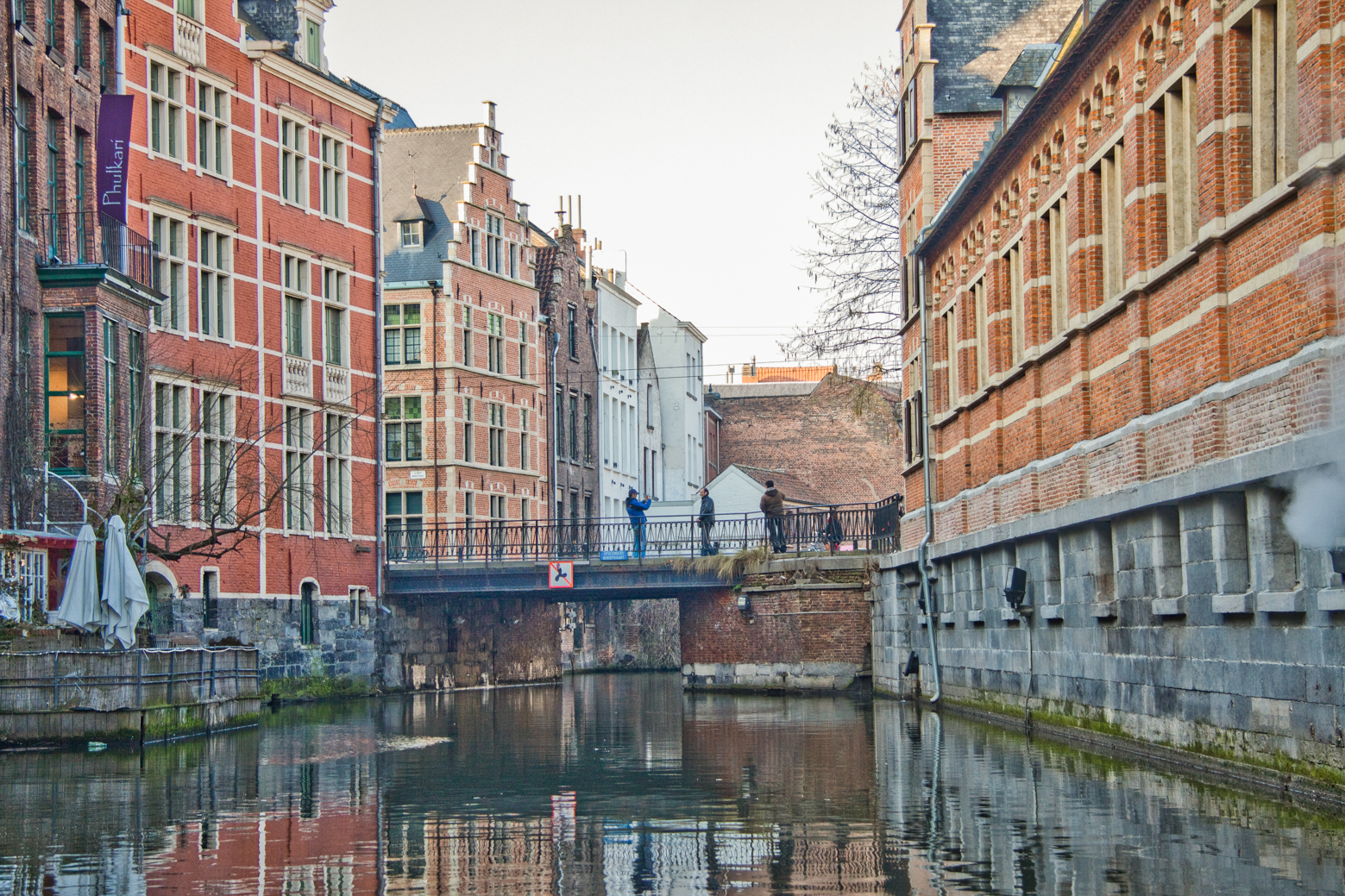
- Coordinates: 51°3′24.05″N 3°43′12.5″E
- Crosses: Leie (river) inlet
- Official name: Onthoofdingsbrug or Hoofdbrug

History
- Construction end: <1371

The Execution Bridge or Decapitation Bridge (Dutch: Onthoofdingsbrug or Hoofdbrug) is a bridge and former public execution location in Ghent, Belgium. It is located beside the city's Gravensteen Castle, crossing a branch of the Leie river, which forms a moat for the castle there. The bridge is a well loved tourist destination.

== History ==
From 1371 or earlier, murderers and rapists were executed by decapitation on the medieval stone bridge. The most recent recorded execution took place in 1585. Until 1799, the bridge was decorated with the statues of two figures, recalling an oft-repeated legend:

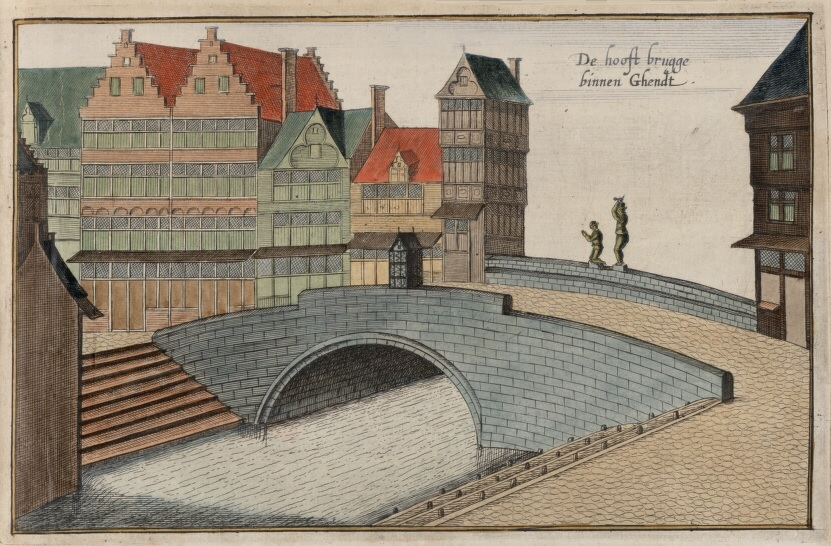
The Decapitation Bridge (before the statues were removed in 1799)

In 1371 a father and son were scheduled for execution at the bridge after rebelling against the Count of Flanders. The count decided to conduct a gruesome experiment, from which he intended to find out whether the love of parents for their children is greater or lesser than the love of children for their parents. The father and son were informed that whichever of them would cut the head of the other should have his own life spared. The father explained to the son that under the circumstances the son should execute his father, because he was younger and should expect to live for longer. The son stood on the bridge and had reached the point of touching the father with his sword when the sword shattered. The duke reacted by pardoning both of them.

A contemporary engraving shows how the two statues were positioned on the side of the bridge at the moment when the son, standing behind the kneeling father who has evidently had his hands bound, raises the sword. The statues were accompanied by an inscription: "Ae Gandte le en Fant fraepe sae pere se Tacte desuu / Maies se Heppe rompe, si Grace de Dieu. MCCCLXXI". However, the statues were removed at the end of the eighteenth century and appear not to have survived.

Albrecht Dürer indeed visited Ghent in 1521 and saw the two statues. He recorded the legend in his travel diary, but according to other sources missed the point: "I also saw on the bridge the place where people's heads are cut off, where two statues have been erected to commemorate a son cutting off his father's head".
