= Ko Yao district =

Ko Yao เกาะยาว
- District
- District location in Phang Nga province
- Coordinates: 8°6′42″N 98°35′27″E
- Country: Thailand
- Province: Phang Nga
- Seat: Ko Yao Noi
- District established: 1903

Area
  - Total: 141.06 km^{2} (54.46 sq mi)

Population (20 September 2003)
  - Total: 13,155
  - Density: 90.3/km^{2} (234/sq mi)
- Time zone: UTC+7 (ICT)
- Postal code: 82160
- Geocode: 8202

Ko Yao (Thai: เกาะยาว, pronounced [kɔ̀ʔ jāːw]) is a district (amphoe) in Phang Nga province in Thailand's south.

== History ==
=== Early history ===
Cave paintings discovered on Ko Yao Island, dating back over 2,000 years, provide evidence of historical influences on the communities in the southern mainland provinces of Thailand.

The initial inhabitants of Ko Yao were the Moken peoples, often referred to as Sea Gypsies. In addition to the Moken, the region has seen the migration of various nomadic peoples from the Malay Peninsula, believed to have settled on the islands between the 17th and 18th centuries. These groups include the Maniq people, the Semang, and other Negrito peoples. Historically, these groups were commonly referred to as Sakai, a term that has since been deemed derogatory by the groups themselves and is no longer widely used in contemporary Thai society.

The Mon people, part of the Khmer ethnolinguistic group, established settlements in peninsular Thailand, including maritime states like Ligor (Nakhon Si Thammarat). Over the centuries, they intermingled with migrants from northern and southern regions of Malaysia and Thailand through commercial exchange and political interactions. This integration has resulted in the Mon ethnic lineage being a prominent component of the demographic makeup in southern Thailand, including the population of Ko Yao.

=== 20th century ===
The minor district (king amphoe) Ko Yao was established in 1903 as a subordinate of Mueang Phang Nga district. On 1 January 1988 it was upgraded to a full district.

== Geography ==
The district covers several islands of the Ko Yao archipelago in Phang Nga Bay, near the island of Phuket. The two main islands are named Ko Yao Yai and Ko Yao Noi ('big long island' and 'small long island'). The northern tips of the islands are part of Ao Phang Nga National Park.

== Religion ==
Ninety percent of the district's population (2018) of 18,000 are Muslims. The Muslim religion was introduced in the 13th century by Arab traders.

== Administration ==
The district is divided into three sub-districts (tambons), which are further subdivided into 18 villages (mubans). Ko Yao itself has sub-district municipality (thesaban tambon) status, which covers parts of tambon Ko Yao Noi. There are a further three tambon administrative organizations (TAO).

No.	Name	Thai	Villages	Pop.
1.	Ko Yao Noi	เกาะยาวน้อย	99	4,833
2.	Ko Yao Yai	เกาะยาวใหญ่	4	2,609
3.	Phru Nai	พรุใน	7	5,713

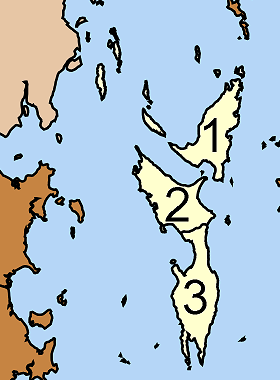
