= Lommel Proving Grounds =

Coordinates: 51°11′52.65″N 5°19′40.02″E

The Lommel Proving Ground also known as the Ford LPG, is an automotive proving ground, constructed by Ford of Europe on ground rented from the municipality of Lommel, located south of the Belgian hamlet of Kattenbos. Lommel covers an area of 3.22 km ², and since the development of new models is kept secret, the track is closed to the public and heavily guarded.

In 1964, Ford came to an agreement with the Borough of Lommel to rent a large area of forest on which to develop a test track. The location was chosen as it was midway between Ford's main development centres and production plants in Germany and the United Kingdom, allowing easy integration access. Operational since 1965, the track was further extended from 1970, resulting in a total of 80 kilometres (50 mi) of varying surfaces by 2008. Besides the test track, there are also environmental chambers, freshwater and saltwater pools.
