= Ton Pariwat Wildlife Sanctuary =

Wildlife Sanctuary

- เขตรักษาพันธุ์สัตว์ป่าโตนปริวรรต
- IUCN category IV (habitat/species management area)
- Location within Thailand
- Location: Thailand
- Nearest city: Phang Nga Province
- Coordinates: 8°44′0″N 98°34′0″E
- Area: 224 km^{2} (86 sq mi)
- Governing body: Wildlife Conservation Office

The Ton Pariwat Wildlife Sanctuary (Thai: เขตรักษาพันธุ์สัตว์ป่าโตนปริวรรต) is located in the north of Mueang Phang Nga district, Phang Nga Province, southern Thailand. It covers an area of 224 square kilometres of forested hills at the southern end of the Phuket mountain range. It is part of a system of protected areas known as the southern forest complex, continued to the northwest by the Khlong Phanom National Park.

Rare species found in the sanctuary include the blue-banded kingfisher (Alcedo euryzona) and the Rafflesia kerrii giant flower. This is also the only home of the Ton Pariwat Stone Oak (Lithocarpus orbicarpus) known from a single tree found in this park.
