= Mueang Phang Nga district =

Mueang Phang Nga เมืองพังงา
- District
- District location in Phang Nga province
- Coordinates: 8°26′36″N 98°31′5″E
- Country: Thailand
- Province: Phang Nga

Area
  - Total: 549.552 km^{2} (212.183 sq mi)

Population (2005)
  - Total: 38,426
  - Density: 69.9/km^{2} (181/sq mi)
- Time zone: UTC+7 (ICT)
- Postal code: 82000
- Geocode: 8201

Mueang Phang Nga (Thai: เมืองพังงา, RTGS: Mueang Phang Nga, pronounced [mɯ̄a̯ŋ pʰāŋ.ŋāː]) is the capital district (amphoe mueang) of Phang Nga province in southern Thailand.

== Geography ==
The district is bordered by several neighboring districts, arranged geographically. To the east, it shares borders with Thap Put and Phanom districts of Surat Thani province. Moving clockwise, the adjacent districts within Phang Nga province include Kapong, Thai Mueang, and Takua Thung. To the south, the district overlooks Phang Nga Bay and is adjacent to the insular district of Ko Yao.

Several protected natural areas are located within or near the district. Ao Phang Nga National Park encompasses the islands to the south of the district, known for their distinctive landscapes and marine biodiversity. Sa Nang Manora Forest Park, covering an area of 0.29 km^{2} (0.11 mi^{2}), is dedicated to protecting the Khao Toy Nang Hong Forest, which includes the Sa Nang Manora waterfall. In the northern part of the district, the Ton Pariwat Wildlife Sanctuary, aim to provide a protected habitat for local wildlife. The district also features a variety of caves situated within its limestone hills, which are notable for their geological formations.

== Administration ==
The district is divided into nine sub-districts (tambons), which are further subdivided into 42 villages (mubans). Phang Nga itself is a town (thesaban mueang) and covers tambon Thai Chang. There are a further seven tambon administrative organizations (TAO).

No.	Name	Thai name	Villages	Pop.
1.	Thai Chang	ท้ายช้าง	-	9,559
2.	Nop Pring	นบปริง	8	6,184
3.	Tham Nam Phut	ถ้ำน้ำผุด	4	3,218
4.	Bang Toei	บางเตย	9	6,667
5.	Tak Daet	ตากแดด	4	2,886
6.	Song Phraek	สองแพรก	3	555
7.	Thung Kha Ngok	ทุ่งคาโงก	5	2,535
8.	Ko Panyi	เกาะปันหยี	4	4,218
9.	Pa Ko	ป่ากอ	5	2,604

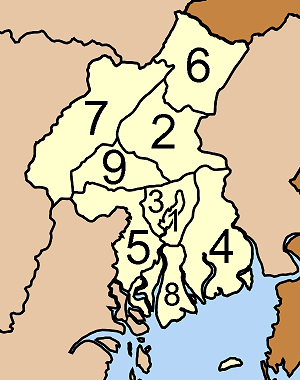

== See also ==
- Khao Chang
