= Survivor: Thailand =

- Season 5
- Region 1 DVD cover
- Presented by: Jeff Probst
- No. of days: 39
- No. of castaways: 16
- Winner: Brian Heidik
- Runner-up: Clay Jordan
- Location: Ko Tarutao, Thailand
- No. of episodes: 15

Release
- Original network: CBS
- Original release: September 19 – December 19, 2002

Additional information
- Filming dates: June 10 – July 18, 2002

Season chronology
- ← Previous; Marquesas Next → The Amazon

Survivor: Thailand is the fifth season of the American CBS competitive reality television series Survivor. The season was filmed from June 10, 2002, through July 18, 2002, on the island of Ko Tarutao in Thailand and premiered on September 19, 2002. Hosted by Jeff Probst, it had 16 participants tasked with surviving in the wild for 39 days. At the live finale, Brian Heidik was named Sole Survivor, defeating runner-up Clay Jordan by a jury vote of 4–3.

== Format ==
Survivor is a reality television show created by Mark Burnett and Charlie Parsons and based on the Swedish show Expedition Robinson. The series follows a number of participants who are isolated in a remote location, where they must provide food, fire, and shelter for themselves. Every three days, one participant is removed from the series by majority vote, with challenges being held to give a reward (ranging from living and food-related prizes to a car) and immunity from being voted off the show. The last remaining player is awarded a prize of $1,000,000.

== Contestants ==
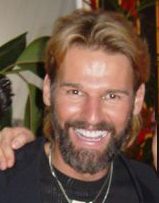
Brian Heidik

The two initial tribes were Chuay Gahn (Thai: ช่วยกัน "to help one another") and Sook Jai (สุขใจ "happy heart"). They eventually merged into the Chuay Jai tribe when eight contestants remained, thus becoming the first merged tribe of Survivor history to have combined words of two existing tribes.

List of Survivor: Thailand contestants
Contestant	Age	From	Tribe		Finish	
Contestant	Age	From	Original	Merged	Placement	Day
John Raymond	40	Slidell, Louisiana	Chuay Gahn		1st voted out	Day 3
Tanya Vance	27	Gray, Tennessee	Chuay Gahn		2nd voted out	Day 6
Jed Hildebrand	25	Dallas, Texas	Sook Jai		3rd voted out	Day 9
Ghandia Johnson	33	Denver, Colorado	Chuay Gahn		4th voted out	Day 12
Stephanie Dill	29	Ozark, Arkansas	Sook Jai		5th voted out	Day 15
Robb Zbacnik	23	Scottsdale, Arizona	Sook Jai		6th voted out	Day 18
Shii Ann Huang	28	New York City, New York	Sook Jai		7th voted out	Day 21
Erin Collins	26	Austin, Texas	Sook Jai		8th voted out 1st jury member	Day 24
Ken Stafford	30	Brooklyn, New York	Sook Jai	Chuay Jai	9th voted out 2nd jury member	Day 27
Penny Ramsey	27	Plano, Texas	Sook Jai	Chuay Jai	10th voted out 3rd jury member	Day 30
Jake Billingsley	60	McKinney, Texas	Sook Jai	Chuay Jai	11th voted out 4th jury member	Day 33
Ted Rogers Jr.	37	Durham, North Carolina	Chuay Gahn	Chuay Jai	12th voted out 5th jury member	Day 36
Helen Glover	47	Middletown, Rhode Island	Chuay Gahn	Chuay Jai	13th voted out 6th jury member	Day 37
Jan Gentry	53	Tampa, Florida	Chuay Gahn	Chuay Jai	14th voted out 7th jury member	Day 38
Clay Jordan	46	Monroe, Louisiana	Chuay Gahn	Chuay Jai	Runner-up	Day 39
Brian Heidik	34	Quartz Hill, California	Chuay Gahn	Chuay Jai	Sole Survivor	Day 39

=== Future appearances ===
Shii Ann Huang returned to compete on the eighth season, Survivor: All-Stars.

== Season summary ==
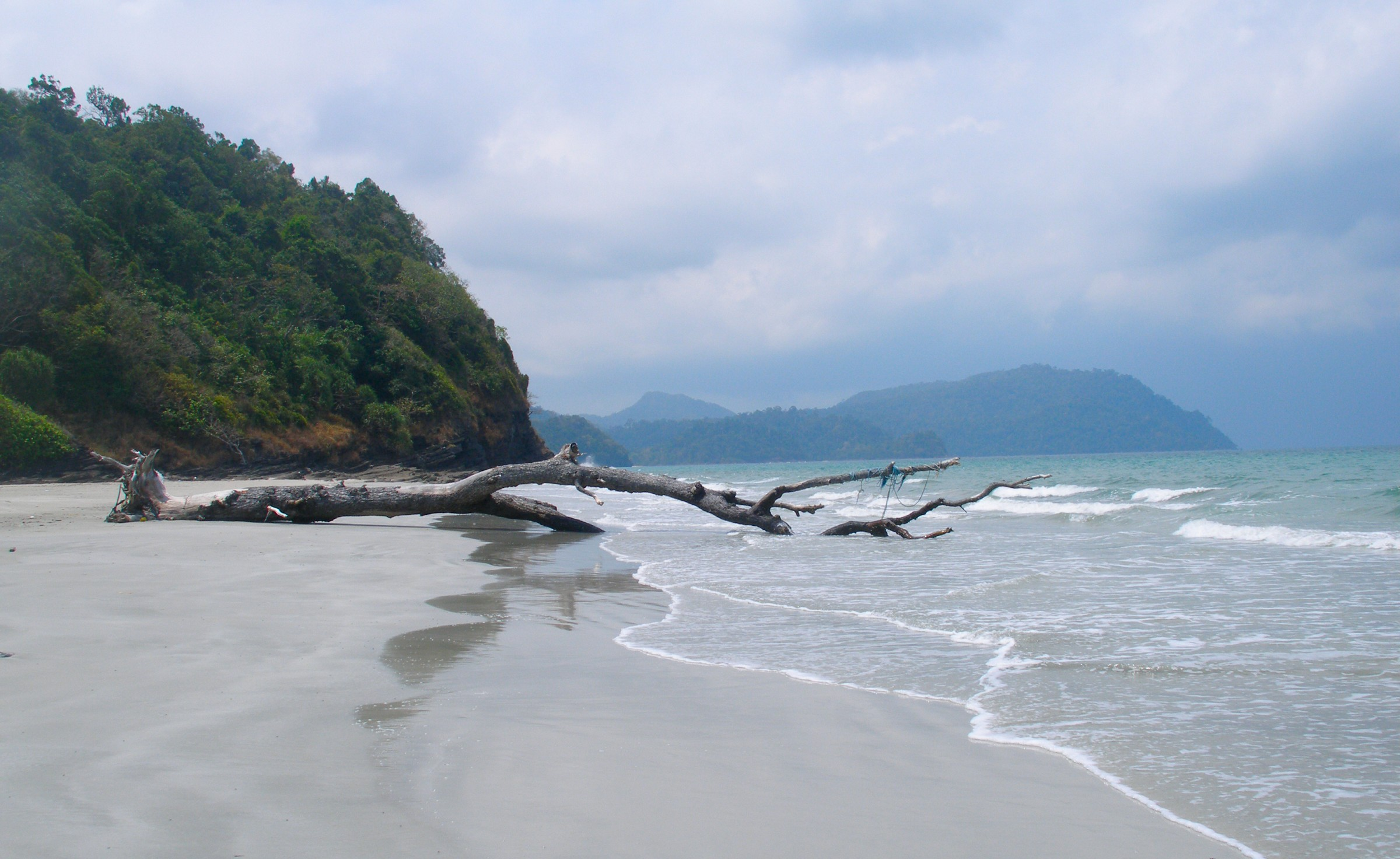
The season was filmed on the island of Ko Tarutao in Thailand.

The sixteen contestants were split into two tribes of eight by the two eldest contestants, Jake and Jan; this was the first time in the series history that the tribes were not preselected. Jake's tribe, Sook Jai, was composed of younger players and took an early lead. Chuay Gahn, despite losing five of the first seven challenges, remained mostly cohesive barring a conflict between Ghandia and Ted, whom Ghandia claimed made unwanted sexual advances toward her. This led to Ghandia being voted off in the next Tribal Council. Chuay Gahn won the next two immunity challenges, evening the playing field at five members per tribe.

On day 19, the tribes were instructed to live on the same beach. Assuming a merge had occurred, Shii Ann from Sook Jai decided to switch allegiances to the Chuay Gahn alliance under the presumption that she was being ostracized by her tribe. However, the players were shocked to learn that they had not yet merged and were only living on the same beach; Shii Ann was subsequently voted off after Sook Jai lost the immunity challenge. Sook Jai was never able to recover from their numerical deficit, and they were systematically picked off one by one once the merge finally happened on day 25.

With only Chuay Gahn members left, they were forced to turn on each other. Brian, who had made separate alliances with three of the four other people used his influence to manipulate the vote to his liking. First, he turned the tribe on Ted, who was perceived as the biggest physical threat. Then, he targeted Helen and successfully convinced Clay and Jan to follow suit. After winning the final immunity challenge, Brian decided to take Clay with him to the finals, eliminating Jan.

Both Brian and Clay were met with heavy criticism from the jury. Brian, who had made separate alliances and formed friendships with both Helen and Ted, was lambasted for his callous approach, but he was praised for his challenge performances and strong work ethic. In comparison, Clay was felt as not deserving for his lack of work ethic, and he was accused of making racial slurs against Ted. In the end, the jury voted 4–3 for Brian to win, awarding him for his control of the game.

Challenge winners and eliminations by episode
Episode			Challenge winner(s)		Eliminated	
No.	Title	Original air date	Reward	Immunity	Tribe	Player
1	"The Importance of Being Eldest"	September 19, 2002	None	Sook Jai	Chuay Gahn	John
2	"The Great Divide"	September 26, 2002	Sook Jai	Sook Jai	Chuay Gahn	Tanya
3	"Family Values"	October 3, 2002	Chuay Gahn	Chuay Gahn	Sook Jai	Jed
4	"Gender Bender"	October 10, 2002	Sook Jai	Sook Jai	Chuay Gahn	Ghandia
5	"The Ocean's Surprise"	October 17, 2002	Survivor Auction	Chuay Gahn	Sook Jai	Stephanie
6	"The Power of One"	October 24, 2002	Sook Jai	Chuay Gahn	Sook Jai	Robb
7	"Assumptions"	October 31, 2002	None	Chuay Gahn	Sook Jai	Shii Ann
8	"Sleeping with the Enemy"	November 7, 2002	None	Chuay Gahn	Sook Jai	Erin
9	"Desperate Measures"	November 14, 2002	Brian	Clay	Chuay Jai	Ken
10	"While the Cats are Away"	November 21, 2002	Brian [Clay]	Helen	Chuay Jai	Penny
11	"The First 30 Days"	November 27, 2002	Recap Episode			
12	"A Big Surprise... and Another"	December 5, 2002	Helen (Note: The players' family members competed in a food-eating challenge on behalf of their loved ones. Helen's husband, Jim, won the challenge and the right to spend 24 hours at the Chuay Jai camp.)	Ted (Note: The players and their loved ones competed as teams for immunity. Ted and his brother, Aljuan, won; thus earning immunity for Ted.)	Chuay Jai	Jake
13	"The Tides are Turning"	December 12, 2002	Ted [Helen]	Brian	Chuay Jai	Ted
14	"Slip Through Your Fingers"	December 19, 2002	None	Brian	Chuay Jai	Helen
14	"Slip Through Your Fingers"	December 19, 2002	None	Brian	Chuay Jai	Jan
15	"The Reunion"	December 19, 2002				

In the case of multiple tribes or castaways who win reward or immunity, they are listed in order of finish, or alphabetically where it was a team effort; where one castaway won and invited others, the invitees are in brackets.

== Episodes ==
No. overall	No. in season	Title	CBS recap	Original release date	U.S. viewers (millions)	Rating/share (18-49)
61	1	"The Importance of Being Eldest"	Recap	September 19, 2002	23.05	9.6/28
The sixteen castaways were dropped off at an island separated by gender, causing some players to think they were going to be divided into tribes of men and women. As the castaways introduced each other, Jeff warned them not to assume anything in the game. He then told the two eldest castaways, Jake and Jan to step forward. Jeff shocked the castaways by announcing that Jake and Jan would choose their own tribes and pick a name. Jake filled his tribe with mostly younger castaways. His tribe consisted of himself, Erin, Jed, Ken, Penny, Shii Ann, Stephanie, and Robb. His tribe was "Sook Jai"; Thai for happy heart. Jan filled her tribe with mostly elder castaways. Her tribe consisted of herself, Brian, Clay, Ghandia, Helen, John, Tanya, and Ted. Her tribe was "Chuay Gahn"; Thai for to help one another. As the tribes arrived at their respective camps, Tanya became ill from what the tribe believed was dehydration, leading Chuay Gahn to search for a water source. After Helen, John, and Tanya found a water source, John pulled a prank on his tribe by telling them a small pool of saltwater was going to be their water source, which didn't go well with some of his tribemates. Meanwhile, Sook Jai focused on their shelter, but Jed wanted to focus on catching fish, isolating him from his tribemates. Robb and Shii Ann argued over the tribe's division of labor.: Immunity Challenge: The tribes must race around a small island by paddling a boat. As they go around the island, they must solve puzzles along the way. One castaway will be stationed at each puzzle. First tribe to assemble their puzzles and retrieve their tribe's flag wins immunity.; At the immunity challenge, Chuay Gahn had an early lead, however Ghandia struggled with her puzzle, allowing Sook Jai to pull ahead and win immunity. After Chuay Gahn lost, Ghandia felt vulnerable after struggling with the puzzle. Tanya also felt vulnerable due to her illness. However, the vote ended up going against John, who was sent home.
62	2	"The Great Divide"	Recap	September 26, 2002	21.72	8.6/21
At Chuay Gahn, Helen and Jan paddled out to retrieve water from their water source, however they did not bring their map and got lost. Meanwhile, the men of Chuay Gahn put Clay's luxury item, a golf club, to use by playing golf in a makeshift golf course. At Sook Jai, their main priority was still to build their shelter. Instead of working on the shelter, Jed and Stephanie gathered food and water. While the other Sook Jai members feasted, Jed, Robb, and Stephanie chose to sleep on the beach. As the tribe awoke to a cold, rainy morning, Stephanie got ill from sleeping out in the rain all night. Meanwhile, Chuay Gahn celebrated Helen's 20th wedding anniversary.: Reward Challenge: The tribes must choose one castaway to act as a guide, while the others will be blindfolded. The blindfolded tribe member must carry their guide in a palanquin, while the guide helps them navigate through a course in order to retrieve tribe-colored bags. First tribe to complete the course and collect all of their bags wins a lantern, a fishing line, and hooks.; At the reward challenge, Tanya guided Chuay Gahn and Penny guided Sook Jai. Sook Jai ended up winning reward.: Immunity Challenge: Each tribe will be given a large, floating lotus flower puzzle that's missing six pieces. The six missing pieces will be tethered to the puzzle, each floating at an equal distance from it. First tribe to untether all of their puzzle pieces and assemble their puzzle wins immunity.; Sook Jai also won a tight immunity challenge, sending Chuay Gahn to Tribal Council for a second time. At Tribal Council, Chuay Gahn couldn't ignore Tanya's illness, and she was sent home.
63	3	"Family Values"	Recap	October 3, 2002	21.46	8.9/22
At Chuay Gahn, Ghandia accused Ted of grinding against her at night. Ted later approached Ghandia and explained that he mistook her for his wife. Ghandia seemingly accepted his apology.: Reward Challenge: The tribes must race across a bamboo course over the water. In the middle of the course was a "contact zone" where the castaways were able to knock other castaways off the course. At the end of the course were two tribe-colored boats filled with baskets. The tribe members must steal baskets from the opposing tribe's boat. If at any point a tribe member was not in the "contact zone" when they made contact with their opponent, they're disqualified from the challenge and their tribe loses a basket to their opposing tribe. First tribe to steal ten baskets wins a reward of Two Thai Red Beret Special Forces soldiers who will visit the winning tribe's camp for a day to help improve living conditions.; Jed, Ken, Robb, and Stephanie were disqualified for making contact outside the "contact zone," causing Sook Jai to lose the challenge. Still bitter about the grinding incident, Ghandia approached Helen and Jan in order to oust Ted. Helen later told Brian about their plan to eliminate Ted. Brian approached Ted in order to hear his side of the story, causing Ghandia to become enraged. Meanwhile, Sook Jai's fishing net drifted away. Jed and Robb were blamed as they fell asleep when they were responsible for the net. Jed and Robb searched the water but failed to find the net.: Immunity Challenge: The tribes were given three stations and one temple made up of six large puzzle pieces. The tribes must transfer the six pieces from their first station to their third. Once the tribes have all their pieces at the third station, they must reassemble the temple so it is identical to the original. First tribe to assemble their temple wins immunity.; Immunity was won by Chuay Gahn, sending Sook Jai to their first Tribal Council. At Tribal Council, Jed was perceived by his tribe to be lazy, and was sent home.
64	4	"Gender Bender"	Recap	October 10, 2002	21.16	8.6/22
After returning from Tribal Council in which Jed was voted out, Stephanie was upset at Sook Jai's decision. Meanwhile, Ghandia felt that she was on the outside of the Chuay Gahn tribe.: Reward Challenge: Before the challenge, the tribes received a 10-foot-tall (3.0 m), 250-pound (110 kg) dummy to be decorated. For the challenge, the tribes had to race around an island while carrying their dummy. First tribe to make it around the island and cross the finish line wins bananas and a mystery food prize, which turned out to be four chickens.; Sook Jai won the reward. After Chuay Gahn returned to camp, the women felt that the men weren't pulling their weight around camp. Meanwhile, Sook Jai enjoyed their bananas and discovered their mystery reward, four chickens.: Immunity Challenge: The tribe members must work in pairs to solve two puzzles, with the goal being to match a picture in front of them. First tribe to correctly assemble their puzzles wins immunity.; Immunity was also won by Sook Jai. After Chuay Gahn lost immunity, Ghandia attempted to form an alliance with the women to target Clay. She approached Helen and revealed that Jan was in on the plan, meaning Helen would be the swing vote. At Tribal Council, Helen voted with the men, sending Ghandia home.
65	5	"The Ocean's Surprise"	Recap	October 17, 2002	22.69	9.2/24
While Brian and Ted set out to catch fish, they took the opportunity to form an alliance. At Sook Jai, Robb stepped on a stingray and stung his foot. Meanwhile, Helen entertained the Chuay Gahn tribe by singing. While Helen entertained her tribe, their canoe floated away. Clay blamed Ted as he felt he had not secured the canoe enough. As the tribes gathered for the Survivor Auction in lieu of a reward challenge, Jeff offered the castaways the opportunity to change tribes. After a minute, no one accepted the offer, so the auction began.: Survivor Auction: Both tribes were given $1,000.00 (USD) to spend as a team on the items presented in the auction.; After returning to camp, Brian and Helen, without the tribe's canoe, swam out to replenish their water supply.: Immunity Challenge: The tribes were each presented with an entire pile of mixed fish. The tribes had to sort the fish into their respective bowls. The fish were barramundi, travelly, squid, and silver fish. The first tribe to correctly sort their fish the quickest wins.; Immunity was won by Chuay Gahn. After returning to camp, Shii Ann and Stephanie discussed the upcoming Tribal Council. Feeling vulnerable, Stephanie wished she had accepted the offer to switch tribes. In the end, Stephanie's fears proved true, and she was sent home.
66	6	"The Power of One"	Recap	October 24, 2002	20.94	8.5/21
After returning from Tribal Council, Robb began to feel vulnerable after his ally Stephanie was eliminated. Meanwhile, having to swim three miles for fresh water, the canoe-less Chuay Gahn tribe became frustrated. Some tribe members took turns looking for the boat, but they all returned empty handed.: Reward Challenge: The tribes must start by selecting one member to be a ball launcher. The remaining tribe members, who will be situated at four different stations, must use wicker baskets in order to catch balls thrown from their tribe's launcher. At the same time, they must try to prevent the other tribe from catching their balls. First tribe to catch five of their balls wins a Thai feast consisting of shrimp, pineapple, vegetables and wine.; At the reward challenge, Robb quickly caught four balls for Sook Jai, however Chuay Gahn quickly evened the score. In the end, Sook Jai caught their fifth ball first, winning reward. As Sook Jai enjoyed their feast, Brian and Ted explained the importance of winning the next immunity challenge so the tribes would merge at five members each. Meanwhile, Ken and Robb hiked out into the jungle and discovered a bat-filled cave. They explored the cave and settled their differences.: Immunity Challenge: There will be 21 flags placed in a circle. Taking turns, the tribes must gather simultaneously one to three flags. The tribe that takes the final flag wins immunity.; In a huge upset, immunity was won by Chuay Gahn, when Sook Jai failed to realize that they could have ensured a victory by virtue of them getting to make the first move. After losing immunity, Sook Jai enjoyed the leftovers of their feast. Despite reconciling with his tribe, Robb was voted out.
67	7	"Assumptions"	Recap	October 31, 2002	18.79	7.5/20
The tribes received tree mail along with body paints of five different colors. The tribe members were instructed to paint themselves with one color representing each member. When the tribes met Jeff, he explained that they would be having a "get-to-know-you". The castaways were instructed to pair off with the person wearing the same paint color. The pairs chose baskets at random. The pair of Clay and Shii Ann received a note telling them to travel to the Chuay Gahn camp. The pair of Ken and Helen were instructed to travel to the Sook Jai camp. The four were instructed to choose which camp would be more comfortable to live in. They chose the Chuay Gahn camp, and Jeff explained that everyone would be living at that camp. Believing the tribes had merged, the castaways created a new name, Chuay Jai by mixing the two tribe names. When they returned to camp, a feast was waiting for them. Later on, Shii Ann, who was on the outside of the Sook Jai tribe, talked to Ted about flipping to Chuay Gahn. Ted agreed to let Shii Ann into their voting bloc. Later on, Brian asked Shii Ann to flip to Chuay Gahn to vote out Penny. As the castaways gathered for what they thought was an individual immunity challenge, Jeff shocked the castaways by explaining that the tribes hadn't actually merged, but were simply living on one beach.: Immunity Challenge: The tribe members will be shackled in a prison. Using resources in the cell, the tribe members must gather keys hanging on the outside of the prison. First tribe to gather their keys and escape wins immunity.; Immunity was won by Chuay Gahn. At Tribal Council, Shii Ann's tribemates decided they could not trust her after she openly aligned with Chuay Gahn. She was sent home.
68	8	"Sleeping with the Enemy"	Recap	November 7, 2002	19.05	7.0/18
After returning from Tribal Council, Penny was relieved her tribe voted out Shii Ann instead of her. Still feeling vulnerable, she attempted to form an alliance with Chuay Gahn member Ted. However, Ted and the other Chuay Gahn men knew that Penny was trying to manipulate them and still didn't trust her. Meanwhile, Ken got annoyed when he smelled urine in the cave. While Jake and Ken set out in their canoe, Ken reminded Jake that Brian was a used car salesman and that he could be very manipulative.: Immunity Challenge: The castaways will be timed while underwater, using bamboo snorkels to breathe. When a castaway comes up for air, their time is stopped. The tribe with the longest cumulative running time underwater wins immunity.; At the immunity challenge, it came down to Brian for Chuay Gahn and Jake for Sook Jai. Brian outlasted Jake, winning immunity for Chuay Gahn. As the castaways returned to camp, they noticed that a monkey had raided their food supply. Meanwhile, Jake blamed himself for losing the immunity challenge. Erin attempted to console Jake. With Tribal Council on its way, Sook Jai held a tribe meeting to determine whether or not they should reveal each other's votes. They felt that it would be extremely tough to vote someone out. In the end, Erin was voted out, becoming the first member of the jury.
69	9	"Desperate Measures"	Recap	November 14, 2002	21.62	8.6/22
With a five to three advantage in numbers over Sook Jai, Chuay Gahn felt that they were in a powerful position. Jake attempted to entertain both tribes and bond with Chuay Gahn by telling adventure stories, however he ended up annoying Clay. As the tribes gathered for a reward challenge, Jeff announced that they had officially merged.: Reward Challenge: The first round would be done in pairs. The pairs must navigate through an obstacle course performing various tasks along the way. The two pairs to complete the obstacle course first move on to the next round. The four finalists must compete against each other to assemble a pyramid puzzle. First castaway to correctly assemble their puzzle wins a video of their loved ones from home.; The challenge came down to Brian and Helen. In the end, Brian won his video from home. Back at camp, Clay revealed his distaste for Ted. Jake, taking advantage of Clay's distaste for Ted, lobbied Clay to form a voting bloc with the Sook Jai three.: Immunity Challenge: The castaways must match Thai numbers with the numbers in English. The first two to match the numbers move on to the final round, where they will be pitted against each other in a test of memory and skill. The castaway that outwits the other wins.; The immunity challenge came down to Clay and Ken. In the end, immunity was won by Clay. After returning to camp, Ted brought up voting out Ken as a physical threat. Ken, feeling vulnerable, attempted to break the Chuay Gahn alliance. In the end, the Chuay Gahn five stuck together, and Ken was voted out, becoming the second member of the jury.
70	10	"While the Cats are Away"	Recap	November 21, 2002	19.61	7.7/19
After returning from Tribal Council, Ted was upset that the three Sook Jai members had targeted him. Jake explained that Clay had told them to vote for Ted, however Ted thought he was lying to him.: Reward Challenge: The castaways must race through a four-stage obstacle course. First, the castaways will pair up to navigate between towers using two wooden planks to bridge the gaps. The first two pairs to finish move on to the second round, where they will have to do a belly crawl underneath a bamboo course. First three to complete the belly crawl move on to the third round, where they will have to climb a wall with the aid of another castaway. First two to climb the wall move on to the final round, where they must race across a balance beam. The castaway that crosses the balance beam first wins an elephant trek through the Thai jungle, plus a Thai feast.; During the third round, both Ted and Brian assisted Clay to the top, where he tried to pull both of them up after himself. Not strong enough to do both, Probst insisted he chose, whereupon Clay chose Brian. In the end, Brian won the reward challenge and chose Clay to join him. After Brian took Clay with him on the reward, Ted questioned the strength of their allegiance to one another. Back at camp, Jake lobbied Helen to flip to Sook Jai, explaining that the only way they could win is by getting rid of Brian or Clay. However, Helen was wary of his intentions. After returning from the reward, Brian and Clay brought back food for the others. Meanwhile, believing that her alliance with Jake could hurt her, Penny decided to distance herself from Jake.: Immunity Challenge: The challenge tested the castaways' knowledge of Thai culture. Each castaway who answered a question correctly was permitted to snuff another castaway's torch. The last castaway with a lit torch wins.; Penny's intentions became clear when she snuffed Jake's torch right away at the immunity challenge. Despite this, the Chuay Ghan alliance (minus Clay) quickly saw through Penny's scheme and immediately took her out of the immunity challenge. Helen won immunity, narrowly beating Ted. After returning from the challenge, Jake speculated on why Penny had turned on him at the challenge. In the end, despite her attempts to get Jake out before herself, Penny was voted out, becoming the third member of the jury.
71	11	"The First 30 Days"	N/A	November 28, 2002	12.40	4.5/14
A recap featuring bonus footage of the first 30 days.
72	12	"A Big Surprise... and Another"	Recap	December 5, 2002	21.39	8.6/21
As the castaways gathered for a reward challenge, they were shocked to see their loved ones. Jeff then announced that the loved ones would be competing against each other.: Reward Challenge: The castaways' loved ones were brought in to compete in the challenge. The loved ones would compete against each other in an insect-eating contest. Should a loved one fail to eat an insect, they are eliminated from the challenge. The loved one that eats everything all the way to the end wins a day at camp with their loved one.; The challenge came down to Helen's husband and Jake's wife. In the end, Helen's husband, Jim, won the challenge. After returning from the challenge, Helen gave Jim a tour of the Chuay Jai camp. Later on, Helen discussed strategy with her husband, telling him that she trusted Brian and didn't trust Clay. When the castaways gathered for the immunity challenge, Jeff announced that the contestants with their loved ones would compete as a team.: Immunity Challenge: The castaways, with the help of their loved one, must retrieve their designated puzzle pieces from a pile in order to construct a cube. The castaways will have their loved one tied to their wrist. First team to construct their cube wins.; In the end, Ted and his brother Aljuan won immunity. After returning to camp, Jake, being the last member of the former Sook Jai tribe, reflected on his vulnerability. In the end, the former Chuay Gahn tribe unanimously sent Jake to the jury.
73	13	"The Tides are Turning"	Recap	December 12, 2002	19.00	7.4/20
The castaways received tree mail, along with a full-length mirror and pictures of themselves from prior to the game. While retrieving tree mail, Ted asked Brian if their alliance was still strong. Despite being told that their alliance was still intact, Ted was still wary of Brian's intentions. As the castaways gathered for the reward challenge, Jeff drove up in a new Chevrolet TrailBlazer and explained the rules.: Reward Challenge: This challenge was a word puzzle. The castaways must gather a series of placards, each bearing a letter, at different stations. Once they have gathered their letters, they must unscramble them in order to form a two-word phrase. The first castaway to unscramble their letters to form the phrase "Road Trip" wins a brand new Chevrolet TrailBlazer, plus a Thai dinner, a shower, and a massage.; The challenge came down to Brian and Ted. Brian managed to unscramble to letters, but misspelled the phrase and yelled it out aloud, giving Ted the correct answer. Ted took advantage and won reward. He chose Helen to come along. While enjoying the reward, Helen and Ted agreed to oust Clay at the next Tribal Council. After returning to camp, Helen approached Jan in hopes of forming a voting bloc against Clay. Later on, Helen, deciding to play on both sides of the fence, approached Brian and revealed her distaste for Ted.: Immunity Challenge: The castaways must assemble a staircase using jigsaw puzzle pieces. The first castaway to assemble their staircase and climb up to the finishing platform wins.; Immunity was won by Brian. At Tribal Council, the castaways decided that Ted was too much of a physical and mental threat and voted him out.
74	14	"Slip Through Your Fingers"	Recap	December 19, 2002	24.08	9.9/26
After returning from Tribal Council in which Ted was voted out, the final four anticipated the difficult choices they would have to make. The castaways received a flower kit with tree mail instructing them to design twelve floating krathongs in honor of the castaways who were previously eliminated. They would later release the krathongs into the sea.: Immunity Challenge: The castaways would compete in an obstacle course containing elements from previous challenges. The first castaway to complete the obstacle course would win.; Immunity was won by Brian. After winning immunity, Brian secured an agreement with Clay to vote out Helen. He approached Jan in hopes of swaying her vote. In the end, the tribe unanimously voted out Helen. On the morning of day 38, Jeff arrived at camp towing a gold canoe with instructions for the tribe's final rite of passage. As the final three castaways paddled, they released the krathongs in honor of the castaways who were voted out.: Immunity Challenge: Situated in the deepest portion of a cave. the castaways must wedge three large coins between their fingers on both hands. While holding the coins, the castaways would position themselves in frames constructed to hold them in an uncomfortable traditional Thai stance. The last person left standing with all of their coins in their hands would win.; At the final immunity challenge, Clay and Jan let their coins go, guaranteeing Brian a spot in the final two. At Tribal Council, Brian voted out Jan, who became the final member of the jury. On day 39, Brian and Clay set their boat ablaze and reflected on the time spent in Thailand. At the final Tribal Council, Erin asked the finalists why the person sitting next to them didn't deserve the million dollars. Brian responded by stating that Clay had not put forth the effort he should have. Clay responded by stating that Brian thought he was the head of camp, and that he expected everyone to call him the leader. Ken asked Brian why the tribe decided to vote out Ted. Brian responded by saying they felt that Ted didn't quite fit in with the group, which to Ken's mind was a lie. Penny asked the finalists about whether they had bothered to get to know her at all. She started with Brian, asking him if he knew where she had grown up and about her siblings. Brian incorrectly answered the questions, while Clay accurately listed several details about her personal life. Jake started with a statement and commended their clever manipulations in turning Penny against him and their alliance to vote him out. He asked Clay why he was threatened when Jake was excited that the votes were based on performance at a previous Tribal Council. Clay didn't answer the question but instead turned it around and said he didn't like how Jake tried to make alliances with all of the Chuay Ghan members and turn them against each other. He asked Brian how he felt at that time, and Brian said he didn't feel the same way due to their teamwork in acquiring food. Next up was Ted, who told Brian that he was a great car salesman, and sold him friendship and loyalty, though it was limited. He then told Clay he was an ignorant redneck hillbilly who rode Brian's coattails. He asked Clay if he made any racist comments behind his back. Clay did not impress Ted by saying he hadn't made any such comments about him, leaving Ted with the impression Clay was dodging whether he had many such remarks in any other context. Jan asked Clay and Brian about their work ethic, or lack thereof. The final statements came from a betrayed Helen, who confronted her former ally Brian. She asked Brian why he hadn't told her that she was the next to go. Brian explained that he heard from Jan that Helen and Ted were targeting him and felt that she had betrayed him first. He admitted that he had made a mistake. Helen then asked Clay, who she deeply disliked and vice versa, to name three instances when he had done physical labor to help the tribe; Clay responded by telling Helen he wasn't going to respond to her question.
75	15	"The Reunion"	N/A	December 26, 2002	20.42	9.2/24
In the same manner as Survivor: Africa two seasons earlier, Jeff Probst returned to a Tribal Council site that was actually a CBS sound stage and read the votes as if he was reading them immediately after they were cast. Also, the audience held off applause until Brian was declared the Sole Survivor with a vote of 4–3 with Brian receiving the votes of Jan, Helen, Ted, and Jake, and Clay receiving Erin, Ken, and Penny's votes. The castaways then discussed the season with Jeff Probst.

== Voting history ==
	Original tribes								Merged tribe					
Episode	1	2	3	4	5	6	7	8	9	10	12	13	14	
Day	3	6	9	12	15	18	21	24	27	30	33	36	37	38
Tribe	Chuay Gahn	Chuay Gahn	Sook Jai	Chuay Gahn	Sook Jai	Sook Jai	Sook Jai	Sook Jai	Chuay Jai	Chuay Jai	Chuay Jai	Chuay Jai	Chuay Jai	Chuay Jai
Eliminated	John	Tanya	Jed	Ghandia	Stephanie	Robb	Shii Ann	Erin	Ken	Penny	Jake	Ted	Helen	Jan
Votes	6–1–1	5–2	5–3	4–2	5–2	5–1	4–1	3–1	5–3	4–2–1	5–1	4–1	3–1	1–0
Voter	Votes													
Brian	John	Tanya		Ghandia					Ken	Penny	Jake	Ted	Helen	Jan
Clay	John	Tanya		Ghandia					Ken	Jake	Jake	Ted	Helen	None (Note: Clay and Jan were not eligible to vote as the only eligible players they could vote for were each other.)
Jan	John	Tanya		Clay					Ken	Penny	Jake	Ted	Helen	None
Helen	Clay	Tanya		Ghandia					Ken	Penny	Jake	Ted	Jan	
Ted	John	Tanya		Ghandia					Ken	Penny	Jake	Jan		
Jake			Jed		Stephanie	Robb	Shii Ann	Erin	Ted	Jan	Jan			
Penny			Jed		Stephanie	Robb	Shii Ann	Erin	Ted	Jake				
Ken			Jed		Stephanie	Robb	Shii Ann	Erin	Ted					
Erin			Jed		Stephanie	Robb	Shii Ann	Ken						
Shii Ann			Jed		Stephanie	Robb	Penny							
Robb			Shii Ann		Shii Ann	Shii Ann								
Stephanie			Shii Ann		Shii Ann									
Ghandia	John	Helen		Clay										
Jed			Shii Ann											
Tanya	John	Helen												
John	Ghandia													

Jury vote
Episode	15	
Day	39	
Finalist	Brian	Clay
Votes	4–3	
Juror	Votes	
Jan	Yes	
Helen	Yes	
Ted	Yes	
Jake	Yes	
Penny		Yes
Ken		Yes
Erin		Yes

== Reception ==
While heavily criticized on various internet outlets in the years that followed its original airing, Survivor: Thailand won the 29th People's Choice Award in 2003 for Favorite Reality Based Program, and remains the third-highest rated season in the show's history in terms of Nielsen ratings.

The primary criticisms of the season centered on the perceived unlikability of the cast and predictability of the end game. In 2005, Probst stated that he was not fond of the season, going as far as calling it his least favorite to date. He described the season as "mean-spirited and marred with hostility and ugliness" and called Helen, Jan, Clay, and Brian "the least likable final four ever." Probst would further elaborate by calling Heidik's game as "so sleazy" and said that "you felt like you needed a shower after watching Brian play." Dalton Ross, the Survivor columnist of Entertainment Weekly, ranked it as the fourth-worst season of the series, only better than Survivor: Fiji, Survivor: Nicaragua, and Survivor: Island of the Idols. Andrea Reiher of Zap2it ranked Thailand as the second-worst season of the series, only ahead of Survivor: Redemption Island, while Joe Reid of The Wire ranked it as the 6th-worst season.

In 2015, both Rob Cesternino and a poll by Rob Has a Podcast ranked this season as the third-worst season of all time. This was updated in 2021 during Cesternino's podcast, Survivor All-Time Top 40 Rankings, ranking 38th. In 2020, Survivor fan site "The Purple Rock Podcast" ranked Thailand as the 3rd-worst season of the series, only ahead of Survivor: Nicaragua and Survivor: Island of the Idols, describing the cast as "a definite contender for least likable cast of all time." Later that same year, Inside Survivor ranked this season 34th out of 40 citing the lack of people to root for and calling it a "bleak" season. In 2024, Nick Caruso of TVLine ranked this season 47th out of 47.
