= Christy Smith =

Christy Smith may refer to:

- Christy Smith (basketball) (born 1975), basketball player and coach
- Christy Smith (politician) (born 1969), member of the California State Assembly
- Christy Smith (Survivor contestant) (born 1978), television personality
