= Survivor: The Amazon =

- Season 6
- Region 1 DVD cover
- Presented by: Jeff Probst
- No. of days: 39
- No. of castaways: 16
- Winner: Jenna Morasca
- Runner-up: Matthew von Ertfelda
- Location: Rio Negro, Amazonas, Brazil
- No. of episodes: 15

Release
- Original network: CBS
- Original release: February 13 – May 11, 2003

Additional information
- Filming dates: November 4 – December 12, 2002

Season chronology
- ← Previous; Thailand Next → Pearl Islands

Survivor: The Amazon is the sixth season of the American CBS competitive reality television series Survivor. The season was filmed from November 4, 2002, through December 12, 2002, in the Amazon and premiered on February 13, 2003. Hosted by Jeff Probst, it consisted of the usual 39 days of gameplay with 16 competitors. This was the first Survivor season to initially divide the tribes by gender. At the live finale, swimsuit model Jenna Morasca won and was named Sole Survivor after defeating Matthew von Ertfelda by a jury vote of 6–1.

== Format ==
Survivor is a reality television show created by Mark Burnett and Charlie Parsons and based on the Swedish show Expedition Robinson. The series follows a number of participants who are isolated in a remote location, where they must provide food, fire, and shelter for themselves. Every three days, one participant is removed from the series by majority vote, with challenges being held to give a reward (ranging from living and food-related prizes to a car) and immunity from being voted off the show. The last remaining player is awarded a prize of $1,000,000.

== Contestants ==
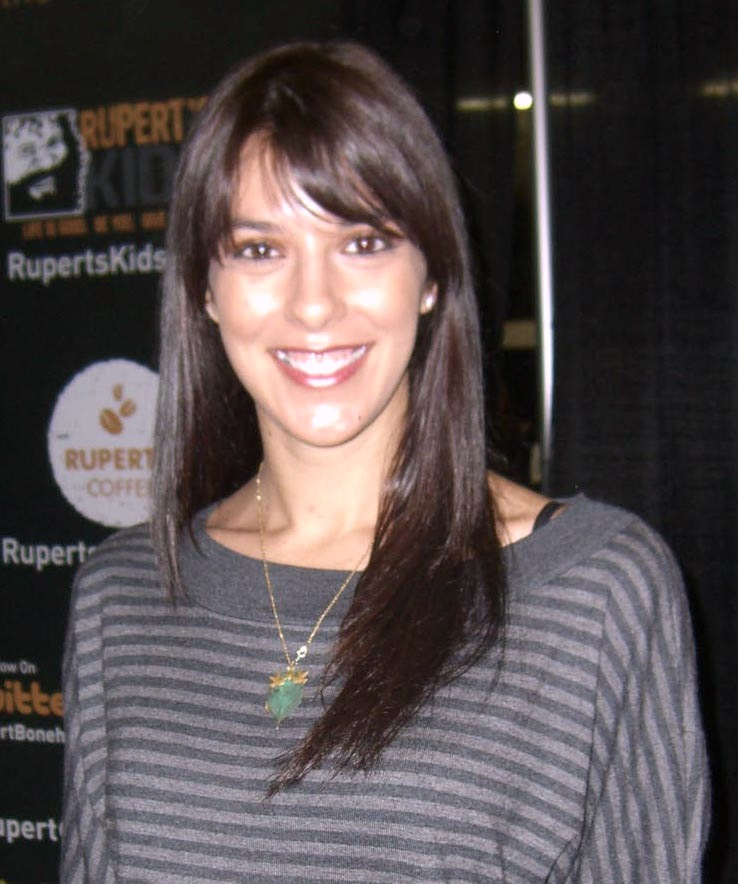
Jenna Morasca

The cast is composed of 16 new players initially divided into two tribes by gender: the all-female Jaburu (named for a native stork) and the all-male Tambaqui (a native fish). They were eventually merged into the Jacaré (Portuguese for "alligator") tribe when ten contestants remained.

Christy Smith became the first reality show contestant with a disability overall, and as well to compete in any edition of Survivor.

List of Survivor: The Amazon contestants
Contestant	Age	From	Tribe			Finish	
Contestant	Age	From	Original	Switched	Merged	Placement	Day
Ryan Aiken	23	Ellicott City, Maryland	Tambaqui			1st voted out	Day 3
Janet Koth	46	Manchester, Missouri	Jaburu			2nd voted out	Day 6
Daniel Lue	26	Houston, Texas	Tambaqui			3rd voted out	Day 9
JoAnna Ward	31	Orangeburg, South Carolina	Jaburu			4th voted out	Day 12
Jeanne Hebert	40	North Attleborough, Massachusetts	Jaburu	Tambaqui		5th voted out	Day 15
Shawna Mitchell	23	Los Angeles, California	Jaburu	Jaburu		6th voted out	Day 18
Roger Sexton	56	Valencia, California	Tambaqui	Tambaqui	Jacaré	7th voted out	Day 21
Dave Johnson	23	Pasadena, California	Tambaqui	Tambaqui	Jacaré	8th voted out 1st jury member	Day 24
Deena Bennett	35	Riverside, California	Jaburu	Jaburu	Jacaré	9th voted out 2nd jury member	Day 27
Alex Bell	32	Los Angeles, California	Tambaqui	Jaburu	Jacaré	10th voted out 3rd jury member	Day 30
Christy Smith	24	Basalt, Colorado	Jaburu	Tambaqui	Jacaré	11th voted out 4th jury member	Day 33
Heidi Strobel	24	Jefferson City, Missouri	Jaburu	Tambaqui	Jacaré	12th voted out 5th jury member	Day 36
Butch Lockley	50	Olney, Illinois	Tambaqui	Tambaqui	Jacaré	13th voted out 6th jury member	Day 37
Rob Cesternino	24	Wantagh, New York	Tambaqui	Jaburu	Jacaré	14th voted out 7th jury member	Day 38
Matthew von Ertfelda	33	Washington, D.C.	Tambaqui	Jaburu	Jacaré	Runner-up	Day 39
Jenna Morasca	21	Bridgeville, Pennsylvania	Jaburu	Jaburu	Jacaré	Sole Survivor	Day 39

=== Future appearances ===
Jenna Morasca and Rob Cesternino later competed in Survivor: All-Stars.

Outside of Survivor, Morasca competed on a "Reality All-Stars" episode of Fear Factor in 2005. In 2011, Morasca competed on The Amazing Race 19 with her then-boyfriend and winner of Survivor: Africa, Ethan Zohn. In 2026, Cesternino competed on the fourth season of The Traitors.

== Season summary ==
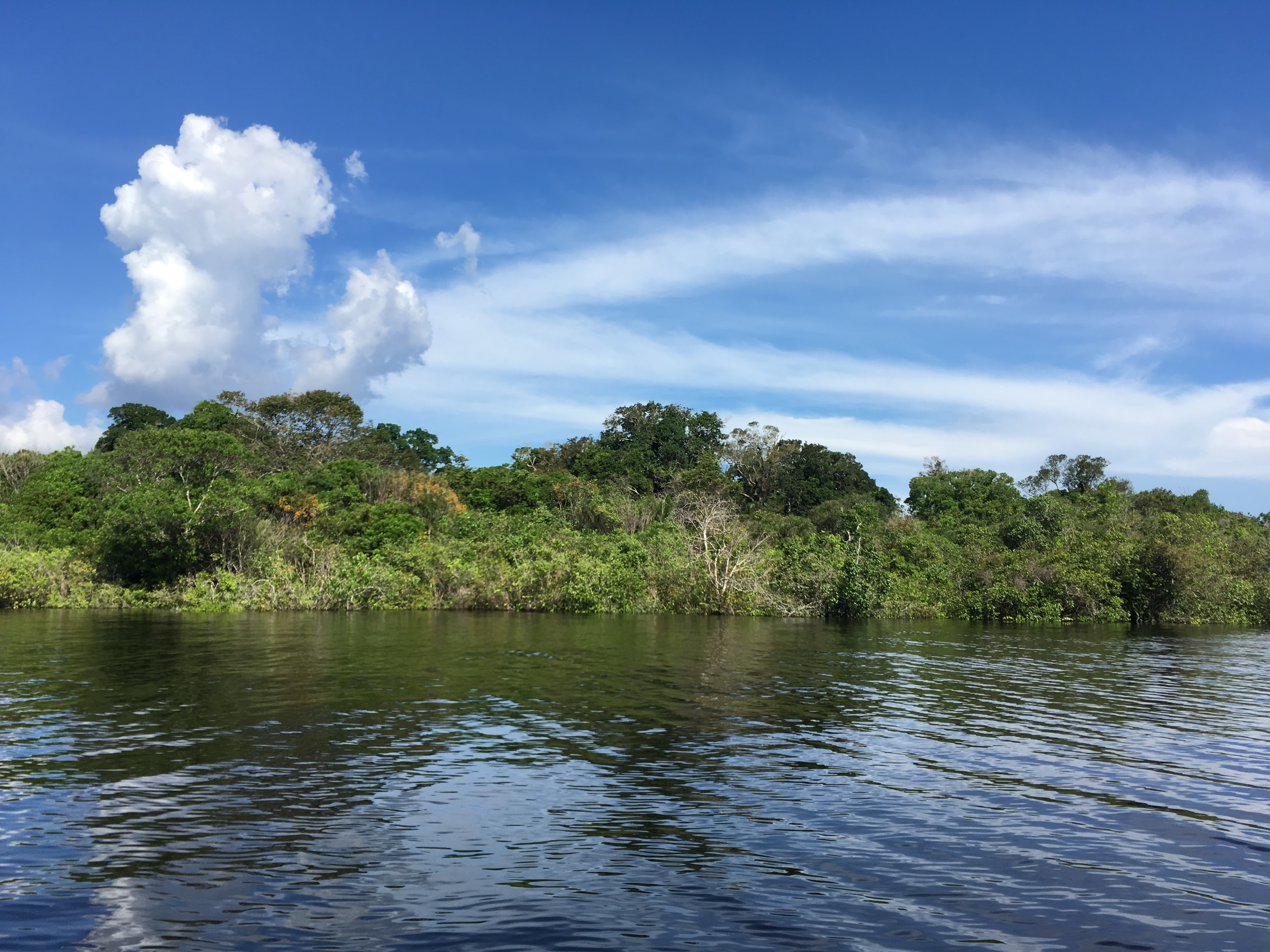
The season was filmed in Rio Negro in The Amazon.

The season began with the contestants divided into tribes split by gender for the first time. The men's tribe, Tambaqui, wearing blue, was quick to get their camp life squared away, building shelter, and alliances were quickly formed. The women's tribe, Jaburu, wearing yellow, experienced quarreling within their tribe, and spent almost the entire first week without a shelter. On Tambaqui, an alliance of four was formed, led by Roger, which included Butch, Alex, and Dave. However, Rob quickly emerged as an arbiter between Roger's alliance and the outliers of the tribe, solidifying allegiances with both. On Jaburu, the younger women, Heidi, Jenna, and Shawna quickly began to coalesce, pulling in Deena and Christy to control the voting on Jaburu.

On day 13, Dave and Jenna traveled to an isolated location to act as tribal ambassadors. Jenna gave Dave crucial information about Jaburu, giving Dave an advantage when, the next day, they were forced to choose new tribes, equally distributing the men and the women. Rob, Matthew, and Alex were sent to Jaburu while Heidi, Jeanne, and Christy were sent to Tambaqui. At Tambaqui, Heidi decided to align with the men to vote off Jeanne. At Jaburu, the men and women joined forces to vote off an untrustworthy Shawna. Deena and Rob created an alliance and when the merge occurred, they aligned with Alex, Matthew, and the rest of the women. At the merge, Deena and Rob's alliance controlled the votes against sexist Roger and physical and mental threat Dave, leaving Butch as the last player remaining outside of Rob and Deena's alliance.

Convinced she had control over the game, Deena decided to spare Butch in order to vote out Alex for being a social and physical threat. The women quickly informed Alex of Deena's betrayal and he was able to convince Heidi, Jenna, and the men to eliminate Deena at the next Tribal Council. With Deena gone, Alex was convinced he was solid in an alliance of four with Jenna, Heidi, and Rob. However, he revealed to Rob that his plan was to vote him out at the final four to avoid a tie with Heidi and Jenna. Rob used this information to form a counter-alliance with Matthew, Butch, and Christy, where they voted out Alex. With three men and three women remaining, Christy became the swing vote but was voted out after failing to commit to either side. The next Tribal Council, the men stuck together and voted off Heidi, perceived to be the more physical of the two women left.

At the final four, Jenna, the final woman remaining, won immunity, forcing the men to prematurely turn on themselves. Faced with either avenging Alex and Heidi by voting off Rob or getting rid of an undeserving Butch, she ultimately sided with Matthew and Rob to vote off Butch. Jenna continued her winning streak and won immunity again, giving her the sole vote at the next Tribal Council, where she voted off Rob due to his strong strategic gameplay. Facing the jury, Matthew was praised for his survival skills and work ethic, but he was criticized for hypocrisy and lack of strategic gameplay for the majority of the game. On the other hand, Jenna was criticized for her lack of work ethic and even wanting to quit a few days earlier. However, as a result of having better relationships with people on the jury, and being seen as playing the game more strategically from the beginning, Jenna was voted to become the Sole Survivor in a vote of 6–1.

Challenge winners and eliminations by episode
Episode			Challenge winner(s)		Eliminated	
No.	Title	Original air date	Reward	Immunity	Tribe	Player
1	"Boys vs. Girls"	February 13, 2003	None	Jaburu	Tambaqui	Ryan
2	"Storms"	February 20, 2003	Jaburu	Tambaqui	Jaburu	Janet
3	"Girl Power"	February 27, 2003	Jaburu	Jaburu	Tambaqui	Daniel
4	"Trapped"	March 6, 2003	Tambaqui	Tambaqui	Jaburu	JoAnna
5	"Pick-up Sticks"	March 13, 2003	None (Note: There was no reward challenge due to the tribe switch.)	Jaburu	Tambaqui	Jeanne
6	"More Than Meats the Eye"	March 19, 2003	Tambaqui	Tambaqui	Jaburu	Shawna
7	"Girls Gone Wilder"	March 26, 2003	None (Note: There was no reward challenge due to the merge.)	Deena	Jacaré	Roger
8	"Sleeping With the Enemy"	April 3, 2003	Dave [Deena]	Jenna	Jacaré	Dave
9	"The Chain"	April 10, 2003	Alex [Jenna]	Matthew	Jacaré	Deena
10	"Amazon Redux"	April 17, 2003	Recap Episode			
11	"Q and A"	April 24, 2003	Survivor Auction	Rob	Jacaré	Alex
12	"Sour Grapes"	May 1, 2003	Matthew [Butch, Christy, Heidi, Jenna, Rob]	~~Jenna~~ (Heidi) (Note: At Tribal Council, Jenna chose to give her immunity to Heidi.)	Jacaré	Christy
13	"The Amazon Heats Up"	May 8, 2003	Matthew [Rob]	Matthew	Jacaré	Heidi
14	"...And Then There Were Four"	May 11, 2003	None	Jenna	Jacaré	Butch
14	"...And Then There Were Four"	May 11, 2003	None	Jenna	Jacaré	Rob
15	"The Reunion"	May 11, 2003				

In the case of multiple tribes or castaways who win reward or immunity, they are listed in order of finish, or alphabetically where it was a team effort; where one castaway won and invited others, the invitees are in brackets.

== Episodes ==
No. overall	No. in season	Title	CBS recap	Original release date	U.S. viewers (millions)	Rating/share (18-49)
76	1	"Boys vs. Girls"	Recap	February 13, 2003	23.26	9.1/24
As the sixteen castaways arrived deep in the Amazon jungle via a river boat, Jeff shocked the castaways when he divided the castaways into a tribe of men, Tambaqui, and a tribe of women, Jaburu. He gave the castaways their buffs and maps to their respective camps. As Tambaqui arrived at their camp, they had a quick meeting and questioned the women's survival skills. When Jaburu arrived at their camp, Christy informed her tribemates that she is deaf. Meanwhile, at Tambaqui, Roger became their leader and became frustrated with Daniel and Ryan's work ethic.: Immunity Challenge: The tribe members would be chained together to navigate through an obstacle course. After each station is completed, the tribes would gather a series of keys to unlock sections of a chain blocking the finish line. Meanwhile, one member of each tribe would retrieve a flying fox, with which they will head down a zipline and find the key that will open the gate that will release the rest of the tribe. The first tribe to unlock their chain and cross the finish line would win immunity.; At the immunity challenge, Tambaqui took an early lead, however Jaburu pulled ahead to win the challenge when Daniel and Ryan had trouble with the balance beam, sending the men to Tribal Council. As Tambaqui returning to camp without immunity, they thought their overconfidence had caused them to lose the challenge. Knowing he was on the chopping block for struggling in the challenge, Ryan formed an alliance to oust Roger, the tribes' oldest and most vocal player. In the end, Ryan's plan failed, and he was sent home.
77	2	"Storms"	Recap	February 20, 2003	20.34	7.7/19
With the need to strengthen their shelter and assign a leader, the Jaburu tribe woke up miserable. Meanwhile, Tambaqui enjoyed a breakfast of manioc flour and set out on a fishing expedition, only to be rained on by a heavy rainstorm. Meanwhile, with their faulty shelter, Jaburu struggled to maintain their fire in the rainstorm.: Reward Challenge: Each tribe must designate a caller. The rest of the tribe members are blindfolded, and the caller must guide their tribemates so they can retrieve 30 designated giant puzzle pieces surrounded by obstacles. Once all 30 pieces are collected, the tribe members must remove their blindfolds and work together to solve the puzzle. First tribe to solve the puzzle wins fishing bait.; At the reward challenge, JoAnna was Jaburu's caller and Butch was Tambaqui's caller. Following JoAnna's instructions, Jaburu was able to win their second consecutive challenge. Tambaqui got frustrated after they lost their second challenge in a row. After winning fishing bait, Jeanne set out to catch fish for her hungry tribe. Meanwhile, JoAnna expressed her dislike for the immunity idol because she felt it was against the Ten Commandments. Christy and JoAnna argued over JoAnna's beliefs. Suspicion arose at Jaburu when a granola bar was found at the bottom of their storage container. Despite being unclaimed, Janet was blamed for smuggling the granola bar. The tribe agreed to throw the granola bar in the fire.: Immunity Challenge: Both tribes will be given two minutes to observe a traditional Amazon home. After the two minutes is up, Jeff will ask the tribe a series of questions about the Amazon home. The tribe that answers the most questions correctly wins immunity.; Immunity was won by Tambaqui. After losing immunity, Christy expressed that she felt her tribe was lazy, causing some friction within Jaburu. At Tribal Council, Janet was targeted for being the weakest, and was blamed for smuggling the granola, and was voted out.
78	3	"Girl Power"	Recap	February 27, 2003	22.37	8.4/22
As rain poured over Tambaqui, the men worked on their daily chores. Roger got frustrated with Daniel's hesitation to help with the water. However, Matthew helped Daniel calm his nerves and the two bonded.: Reward Challenge: Each castaway will have a basket containing five items. The castaways must try to match one of their items with another castaway. The tribe with the most matches wins personal hygiene products.; Reward was won by Jaburu. While Jaburu bathed with their newly acquired personal hygiene products, the younger women bathed separately from the older women. Meanwhile, at Tambaqui, Matthew and Dave discussed whether to eliminate Daniel or Roger. At Jaburu, Deena became the tribe's leader. With Deena's leadership, Jaburu managed to repair the roof of their shelter, boil five pots of water, and caught fish to give them nutrition for the next challenge.: Immunity Challenge: Each tribe will be locked inside a prison-like cage. In order to escape, the tribe members must untie a series of ropes in order to release a machete. Then the tribes must use their machete to cut through a rope, then they must undo another series of knots in order to release a plank, which will in turn release a pole. They must use the pole to retrieve a set of keys on the outside of the cage. Once the keys are collected, they must unlock their chains and release their escape hatch. First tribe to open their escape hatch wins immunity.; At the immunity challenge, Tambaqui fell behind when they failed to saw through the rope attaching the plank of wood properly, allowing Jaburu to pull ahead and win immunity. Knowing he was on the chopping block, Daniel attempted to form an alliance with Alex and Rob in order to oust Roger. Despite his attempts to target Roger, the tribe voted out their weakest link, Daniel.
79	4	"Trapped"	Recap	March 6, 2003	23.33	9.3/23
At Jaburu, Jeanne and JoAnna were doing most of the work. While Tambaqui struggled to catch fish, JoAnna caught a fish for Jaburu. At Jaburu, a rift between the younger women and the older women formed. Knowing they were vulnerable, Heidi, Jenna and Shawna lobbied Deena to join their alliance. Feeling she could manipulate the younger women more easily, Deena agreed to align with Heidi, Jenna and Shawna. Meanwhile, at Tambaqui, Matthew became the tribe's provider.: Reward Challenge: Each tribe had four ropes attached to a 30-foot tower. Each rope is attached to a fire-making station. The tribes must gather enough firewood in order to build a fire high enough to burn through all four ropes. Each time a rope is burned, a portion of a banner at the top of the tower is released. First tribe to burn through all four ropes and release their banner wins a refrigerator filled with iced Coca-Cola.; At the reward challenge, Jaburu took an early lead, however Tambaqui managed to pull ahead and win reward. After her tribe lost the challenge, Shawna had grown extremely tired and lost motivation. Meanwhile, Tambaqui enjoyed their Coca-Cola and a large fish that Matthew had caught.: Immunity Challenge: Each tribe will be given one hour to catch as many fish as they can. The tribe that catches the most fish in one hour wins immunity. The winning tribe will also take home all the fish they had caught.; At the immunity challenge, Tambaqui had caught more fish than Jaburu and won their second challenge in a row. After returning to camp, Shawna was still not feeling well and threatened to break her alliance. Deena, Heidi, and Jenna pulled Christy into their alliance in case Shawna broke their alliance. In the end, Shawna did not vote with her alliance. However, with Christy's help, they managed to send JoAnna home.
80	5	"Pick-up Sticks"	Recap	March 13, 2003	21.05	8.1/21
With JoAnna gone, Deena felt she had more leadership than before. Meanwhile, Shawna was ready to give up after her alliance voted against her wishes kept her in the game. Meanwhile, at Tambaqui, Alex accidentally sliced his eyebrow as he was cutting firewood. Alex hurried to notify his tribemates and was bandaged up by the medical team. Both tribes received tree mail instructing them to send their youngest member, Dave from Tambaqui and Jenna from Jaburu, on a journey. Dave and Jenna met Jeff at a luxury Amazon retreat. Jeff announced that they were going to have a "Get to Know You". Dave listened to the information that Jenna willingly provided about her tribe. She described her friendship with Heidi. As the two awoke the next morning, they found a breakfast waiting for them. As they enjoyed their breakfast, Jeff arrived to announce a twist. Jeff dropped nameplates on the table, each with the name of a castaway. He instructed the two to pick new tribes and told them to alternate between genders. Being aware of Heidi and Jenna's friendship, Dave chose Heidi for his tribe first in order to separate the two women. Once they finished, the new Jaburu tribe consisted of Alex, Deena, Jenna, Matthew, Rob, and Shawna. The new Tambaqui tribe consisted of Butch, Christy, Dave, Heidi, Jeanne, and Roger. After the two paddled to their camps, they announced the switch to their old tribes. The new members of both tribes were welcomed with opened arms. After Christy revealed her deafness to the men, they made an effort to include Christy in all conversations, and used the lantern to help her read lips at night. Meanwhile, at Jaburu, Shawna seemed to overcome her fatigue.: Immunity Challenge: This challenge had two stages. In the first stage, the tribes must find five words and circle them in a wordsearch-like puzzle. Once they've found all five words, they must paddle to a small island in order to retrieve five flags corresponding to the five words. First tribe to cross the finish line with the correct flags wins immunity.; Immunity was won by Jaburu. After Tambaqui returned to camp, the women planned to target Butch and cause a tie between the men and the women. However, Dave lobbied Heidi to vote with the men, leading Heidi to become the swing vote. In the end, Dave's lobbying proved effective, and Jeanne was sent home.
81	6	"More Than Meats the Eye"	Recap	March 20, 2003	16.42	6.1/14
At Jaburu, Shawna had a romantic interest in Alex.: Reward Challenge: The castaways must square off against someone of the same sex on the opposing tribe by balancing on a revolving log over a mud pit. The last castaway left standing on the log earns a point for their tribe. First tribe to score five points wins spices, plus a bowl of fruit.; At the reward challenge, it came down to Christy and Jenna to break a tie. Christy outlasted Jenna, winning reward for Tambaqui. With Deena's authority at Jaburu diminishing, she formed an alliance with Rob. Rob then pulled Matthew into their alliance.: Immunity Challenge: Each tribe will be given a chunk of meat on a hook. With their hands tied behind their backs, the castaways must tear off pieces of meat using only their mouths. The castaways must then drop the meat on their tribe's scale. After ten minutes, the tribe with the most meat on their scale wins immunity.; At the immunity challenge, it was neck and neck until Tambaqui tore off a large piece of meat, winning immunity. After Jaburu returned to camp, Alex and Shawna revealed that they would be voting for Matthew. However Rob had just formed an alliance with Matthew, and chose to target Shawna with Deena, Jenna, and Matthew. In the end, Rob's plan came into fruition and Shawna was sent home.
82	7	"Girls Gone Wilder"	Recap	March 27, 2003	16.67	6.3/16
Jaburu agreed to form a voting bloc once the tribes merge. As the tribes read their tree mail, they found a key that will unlock a mysterious box at their camps. They were instructed to pack up their camp and paddle to a spot where they would meet Jeff. Once the castaways arrived, Jeff announced the merge and distributed new red buffs. Jeff then sent the castaways to a new camp along the river. As the castaways enjoyed their merge feast, they named the new tribe "Jacaré", Portuguese for alligator. While enjoying the feast, Roger got upset when his tribe used their ice to cool their beer instead of using it to preserve their food. Roger caused tension among the tribe as he gave orders to his tribemates. As the castaways built their shelter, Deena discussed voting out Roger with Heidi and Jenna. Roger planned to pick off the four women one by one. As morning came, Roger continued to annoy his tribemates by chopping wood too early. Deena discussed her plan to eliminate Roger with Rob, who agreed.: Immunity Challenge: The castaways must stand onto a perch as long as they can. During the challenge, food items will be presented to the castaways in order to test their temptations. The last castaway left standing wins immunity.; At the immunity challenge, Heidi and Jenna stripped naked in exchange for peanut butter and chocolate. It came down to Christy and Deena, and the outcome would be decided using a game of rock-paper-scissors. Christy lost, giving immunity to Deena. At Tribal Council, Deena's plan came into fruition, and Roger was voted out.
83	8	"Sleeping with the Enemy"	Recap	April 3, 2003	19.80	7.3/19
After returning from Tribal Council, Dave felt vulnerable after his ally Roger was eliminated. Dave attempted to secure his position in the tribe by helping Butch construct a dock. However, Rob wasn't impressed and felt that Dave was a showoff. Meanwhile, Matthew worried his tribe as he kept on sharpening the machete for an hour at a time.: Reward Challenge: The challenge will start with the castaways divided into teams of three. While bounded by a bungee cord, the team members race through a pool of mud to collect five team-colored flags. First team to collect all five flags will move on to the final round. The final round is the same challenge, however the winning team members would compete individually in order to retrieve three flags. First person to collect three flags wins a cold bath, a banana split, and a brownie sundae.; The team of Alex, Dave, and Deena won the first round of the reward challenge, with Dave winning the final round. Dave chose Deena to join him on the reward. As Dave and Deena enjoyed their reward, Dave lobbied Deena to keep him in the game. Deena agreed to talk to her alliance about keeping him in the game.: Immunity Challenge: Each castaway will have a mask attached with three ropes to a suspended log. The castaways will be asked a series of questions about Amazonian and Brazilian culture and survival skills. When a castaway answers a question correctly, they must cut through one of the ropes attached to their opponent's mask. Once all three of a castaways ropes are cut, the log will smash the mask, eliminating that player. Last castaway with their mask intact wins immunity.; At the immunity challenge, it came down to Heidi and Jenna. Jenna answered the final question correctly, winning immunity. After returning to camp, Matthew continued to irk his tribemates with his behavior. Despite Matthew's behavior, Dave was perceived as a physical threat, and he was voted out, becoming the first member of the jury.
84	9	"The Chain"	Recap	April 10, 2003	19.08	7.1/20
The castaways received tree mail, along with blow guns, spears, bows, and arrows. They were instructed to practice for the reward challenge.: Reward Challenge: The castaways must use Amazonian weapons to hit a target. The four that hit closest to the bull's eye moves on to the second round. The second round was the same challenge, with the top two moving on to face off against each other. The castaway hitting closest to the bull's eye wins a trip to an Amazon coffee bar.; At the reward challenge, it came down to Alex and Matthew. Alex shot closest to the center, winning reward. He chose Jenna to join him on the reward. While Alex and Jenna enjoyed their reward, Deena plotted to oust Alex as she felt he was a physical threat. Meanwhile, Butch accidentally caught a piranha while fishing, and got bitten in the finger. When Alex and Jenna returned to camp, Heidi revealed Deena's plan to Jenna. Jenna then told Alex that Deena was targeting him for elimination.: Immunity Challenge: The castaways must compete in a four-round elimination race to eat native Amazonian dishes. First person to finish the final round (consisting of two castaways) wins immunity.; The immunity challenge came down to Deena and Matthew. Matthew swallowed a live beetle larva whole first, winning immunity. Unaware that Heidi had already revealed Deena's plan, Deena lobbied Jenna to vote for Alex at Tribal Council, upsetting Jenna. In the end, Deena's scheming cost her the game, and she was voted out, becoming the second member of the jury.
85	10	"Amazon Redux"	N/A	April 17, 2003	14.23	5.2/16
A recap of the first 27 days including previously unaired footage.
86	11	"Q and A"	Recap	April 24, 2003	18.09	6.5/19
Each castaway received US$500 in their tree mail for a Survivor Auction. At the auction, Jeff shocked the castaways by bringing letters from home up for bids. Christy outbid Jenna, winning her letter from home. The castaways were shocked when Jeff put another letter from home up for bid. The tribe let Jenna win the second letter. After returning to camp, Jenna, whose mother was ill, was upset at Christy for outbidding her. Meanwhile, Alex revealed to Rob that he would vote him out should their alliance make it to the final four. Upset, Rob approached Matthew to oust Alex with the help of Butch and Christy. Matthew agreed to vote for Alex at Tribal Council.: Immunity Challenge: Before the challenge, the castaways were instructed to fill out a questionnaire about their tribemates privately. For the challenge, when asked a question, the castaways must guess the most common answer. Each answer will be the name of a tribemate. First castaway to answer five questions correctly wins immunity.; At the immunity challenge, it came down to Rob and Matthew. Rob answered the final question correctly, winning immunity. Unaware of Rob's plot against Alex, the alliance of Heidi, Jenna, and Alex decided to target Matthew, who they saw as a physical threat. At Tribal Council, Rob's plan came into fruition, and Alex was voted out, becoming the third member of the jury.
87	12	"Sour Grapes"	Recap	May 1, 2003	17.65	6.5/19
Heidi and Jenna were furious at Rob for turning against Alex at Tribal Council. While the men were out working, Heidi and Jenna lobbied Christy to align with them in order to oust one of the men.: Reward Challenge: The castaways must start by retrieving a paddle buried in the sand. The two that didn't find a paddle will be eliminated from the challenge. The remaining four must then paddle out to a floating box, where they will find a survival-related question and bags filled with puzzle pieces. The castaways must then match the correct answer with the corresponding bag. If they answered correctly, their bag will contain the correct puzzle pieces that would form the shape of a snake. First person to assemble their puzzle wins time at an Amazonian tribal village with a loved one.; Matthew won the reward challenge, and was given the chance to sacrifice the visit from his mother to let everyone else reunite with their loved ones. Matthew chose to sacrifice the visit from his mother. Not wanting Matthew's act to go unrewarded, Jeff allowed Matthew to reunite with his mother and enjoy the reward at the village. As the five other castaways returned to camp, Rob attempted to make amends with Heidi and Jenna. He brought up voting out Matthew as a threat and taking Jenna to the final two. However, Jenna still didn't trust Rob, and she told the tribe of his plans.: Immunity Challenge: The castaways must use a slingshot to crack plates with shuffleboard pucks inside. Then they must slide their pucks on the shuffleboard, aiming for the "X" at the end of the board. The number of plates they had broken will determine their number of pucks. The castaway whose puck lands closest to the "X" wins immunity.; Immunity was won by Jenna. After returning to camp, Rob lobbied Christy, the swing vote, to vote out Heidi. Christy told Rob that her decision was still up in the air. However, Rob realigned himself with Heidi and Jenna to target Christy, who was a threat to ruin the Heidi-Jenna alliance. At Tribal Council, Jenna gave up immunity for Heidi. Rob's plan came into fruition, and Christy was voted out, becoming the fourth member of the jury.
88	13	"The Amazon Heats Up"	Recap	May 8, 2003	18.99	7.0/20
Jenna was feeling the effects of the harsh living conditions. Meanwhile, Rob planned on voting out Heidi due to her being a physical threat and told her about his plan to be honest with the girls. Butch, with Rob's help, continued to collect "firewood," despite the large amount of wood around camp, causing Rob and Jenna to question his sanity.: Reward Challenge: The castaways must start by untying knots in order to escape a cage. Once they escape, they must solve a puzzle. Once completed, they must swing across a riverbed to solve another puzzle. Once they've completed the puzzle, they must retrieve a set of keys while being propelled by a flying fox. First castaway to retrieve their keys wins a brand new Saturn Ion, plus a barbecue feast to be enjoyed with another tribemate.; Matthew won the reward challenge, and chose Rob to join him on the barbecue. As the remaining castaways returned to camp, a fire had burned much of their camp, burning many of the castaways' clothes and personal belongings. Once Matthew and Rob returned from their reward, the men worked to rebuild the camp. Heidi and Jenna, knowing the men planned to vote them out, did not help as they felt it would make the men's lives easier.: Immunity Challenge: The castaways must navigate a rope course, avoiding obstacles along the way, in order to retrieve five feathers. First castaway to retrieve their five feathers wins immunity.; Immunity was won by Matthew. As the castaways returned to camp, Jenna broke down in tears, wanting out of the game. Knowing she was on the chopping block, Heidi lobbied to vote out Jenna at Tribal Council due to the pain she was in. In the end, the men felt that Heidi was more of a threat than Jenna, and she was voted out, becoming the fifth member of the jury.
89	14	"...And Then There Were Four"	Recap	May 15, 2003	22.29	8.9/22
After returning from Tribal Council, the final four celebrated making it that far. Meanwhile, the men planned to vote out Jenna next.: Immunity Challenge: The castaways must navigate through a maze blindfolded. The first castaway to retrieve four necklaces at stations within the maze and then return to the center of the maze wins immunity.; The men's plan to eliminate Jenna was thwarted after she won the challenge, keeping her safe from the vote. After returning to camp, Matthew and Rob discussed voting out Butch. Later on, Matthew formed a secret alliance with Jenna to take her to the final two. Although Jenna was interested in siding with Butch, the tribe unanimously voted him out, sending him to the jury 3–1. After eating breakfast, the final three castaways were shocked to find a bathroom scale in their tree mail. The three castaways each stepped on the scale and discovered how much weight they had lost over 38 days. Later on, Jeff arrived at the Jacaré camp and instructed the castaways to board a seaplane, where they would get an aerial view of the Amazon. Once finished, they were instructed to paddle to Tribal Council, where they would compete in the final immunity challenge.: Immunity Challenge: The castaways must balance themselves on a narrow wooden perch while holding a headdress over their head. They have a bead necklace attached to the headdress, which prevents the castaways from holding the headdress too high. The last castaway standing wins immunity.; During the challenge, Matthew was the first to fall off the perch. Rob offered to take Jenna to the final two if she stepped down. However, Jenna declined Rob's offer. Jenna ended up outlasting Rob, guaranteeing herself a spot in the final two. At Tribal Council, Jenna ended up voting out Rob, who she felt was more of a threat to win the game than Matthew. On their final day at the Amazon, Jenna and Matthew reminisced about their eliminated tribemates and wrote each castaway's name on their supply crate. Matthew, wanting to add closure to their experience, brought the tribe's boat to shore and placed the camp artifacts inside. Matthew then set the contents on fire and sent the boat down the river. At the final Tribal Council, Jenna stated to the jury members that they knew who she was. Matthew stated that he was dedicated to the tribe, that he was a serious competitor, and that he played with honor and integrity. Butch asked Jenna and Matthew if they had lied to or deceived any of their tribemates. Jenna responded by claiming she had lied to Deena, who she felt had betrayed their alliance. Matthew claimed that he had lied to Alex and Roger in order to save himself. Rob asked the final two castaways why the other finalist didn't deserve to be sitting next to them. Matthew responded by saying that Jenna did not contribute much around camp and that she had the desire to quit. Jenna responded by saying that Matthew hadn't been playing the game, didn't need the money, and that it was "just another adventure on his list of things to do". Alex stated to the finalists that the words "honesty" and "integrity" didn't mean anything to him anymore. He asked them about their biggest regret. Jenna said it was putting trust in untrustworthy people. Matthew said it was his decision to support Ryan at the first vote. Next up was Heidi, who asked the finalists whether they felt there was someone else more deserving of being in their position. Both Jenna and Matthew answered Rob. Deena was concerned about Jenna's statement that Matthew didn't need the money, and wondered if they should vote on need and not gameplay. Jenna responded that if she were on the jury, she would vote on need, but understands that others may feel differently. Deena then stated to Matthew that she was offended by the comment "may the best man win" he made at an earlier Tribal Council. Matthew apologized to Deena. Next up was Christy, who asked the finalists what their reactions were when they learned she was deaf. Matthew responded by claiming he thought she had a "funky accent". Christy demanded an explanation from Jenna about her comment that she, Jenna, was "handicapped because she was beautiful". Jenna claimed that she didn't remember making that comment, but says she feels others judged her as not smart or strong because she's a swimsuit model. Last up was Dave, who asked which influential leader a castaway should emulate in the game. Matthew answered Colin Powell, while Jenna chose her mother for "her fight and strength". In his closing speech, Matthew admitted that he had lied along the way, however mentioned that it was part of the game. Jenna mentioned that she had come through in the end when she needed to save herself.
90	15	"The Reunion"	N/A	May 22, 2003	17.65	8.2/21
Months later, it was revealed that the jury gave Jenna the title of Sole Survivor, along with the million dollars. She won with six out of the seven jury votes. Only Butch voted for Matthew to win. Then, all 16 castaways discussed the season with host, Jeff Probst at the Ed Sullivan Theater in New York City, on David Letterman's Late Show stage which was decorated to look like the tribal council set in the Amazon.

== Voting history ==
	Original tribes				Switched tribes		Merged tribe							
Episode	1	2	3	4	5	6	7	8	9	11	12	13	14	
Day	3	6	9	12	15	18	21	24	27	30	33	36	37	38
Tribe	Tambaqui	Jaburu	Tambaqui	Jaburu	Tambaqui	Jaburu	Jacaré	Jacaré	Jacaré	Jacaré	Jacaré	Jacaré	Jacaré	Jacaré
Eliminated	Ryan	Janet	Daniel	JoAnna	Jeanne	Shawna	Roger	Dave	Deena	Alex	Christy	Heidi	Butch	Rob
Votes	4–3–1	5–1–1–1	6–1	4–2–1	4–2	4–2	7–3	8–1	6–2	4–3	4–2	3–2	3–1	1–0
Voter	Votes													
Jenna		Janet		JoAnna		Shawna	Roger	Dave	Deena	Matthew	Christy	Rob	Butch	Rob
Matthew	Roger		Daniel			Shawna	Roger	Dave	Deena	Alex	Christy	Heidi	Butch	None (Note: Matthew and Rob were not eligible to vote as the only eligible players they could vote for were each other.)
Rob	Ryan		Daniel			Shawna	Roger	Dave	Deena	Alex	Christy	Heidi	Butch	None
Butch	Ryan		Daniel		Jeanne		Christy	Dave	Deena	Alex	Jenna	Heidi	Rob	
Heidi		Janet		JoAnna	Jeanne		Roger	Dave	Deena	Matthew	Christy	Rob		
Christy		Jenna		JoAnna	Butch		Roger	Dave	Alex	Alex	Jenna			
Alex	Ryan		Daniel			Matthew	Roger	Dave	Deena	Matthew				
Deena		Janet		JoAnna		Shawna	Roger	Dave	Alex					
Dave	Daniel		Daniel		Jeanne		Christy	Matthew						
Roger	Ryan		Daniel		Jeanne		Christy							
Shawna		Janet		Christy		Matthew								
Jeanne		Janet		Shawna	Butch									
JoAnna		Christy		Shawna										
Daniel	Roger		Roger											
Janet		Jeanne												
Ryan	Roger													

Jury vote
Episode	15	
Day	39	
Finalist	Jenna	Matthew
Vote	6–1	
Juror	Votes	
Rob	Yes	
Butch		Yes
Heidi	Yes	
Christy	Yes	
Alex	Yes	
Deena	Yes	
Dave	Yes	

== Reception ==
Reception to Survivor: The Amazon was mostly positive with common praise being the tribe division by gender and bearing colorful players such as Rob Cesternino. Jeff Probst ranked The Amazon as his 10th favorite season, citing the women's alliance led by Jenna, among other factors. Dalton Ross, the official Survivor columnist of Entertainment Weekly, ranked it as his seventh favorite season, calling it "probably the most unpredictable season ever." In 2012 and 2013, "Survivor Oz" ranked The Amazon in the top 10 greatest seasons in its annual polls ranking every season of the series; it was 9th in 2012 and 7th in 2013. In the official issue of CBS Watch commemorating the 15th anniversary of Survivor, The Amazon was voted by viewers as the 8th greatest season of the series. Also, in another poll for the same magazine, Rob was voted as the #3 greatest player in the series for his performance in The Amazon. In 2015, when Rob himself eventually held a poll on his reality TV podcasting website, The Amazon was ranked by his viewers as the 5th-greatest season in the series; Rob himself personally ranked it as the seventh-greatest. This was updated in 2021 during Cesternino's podcast, Survivor All-Time Top 40 Rankings, ranking 8th. In 2020, "Purple Rock Podcast" ranked this season 14th out of 40 saying that "this season earns its rank based on several memorable moments of both gameplay and comedy." Later in the year, Inside Survivor ranked this season 8th out of 40 saying "The Amazon takes Survivor strategy to new heights, which makes for exciting and unpredictable television." In 2024, Nick Caruso of TVLine ranked this season 11th out of 47.
