= Jenna Morasca =

American actress, glamour model and reality television personality

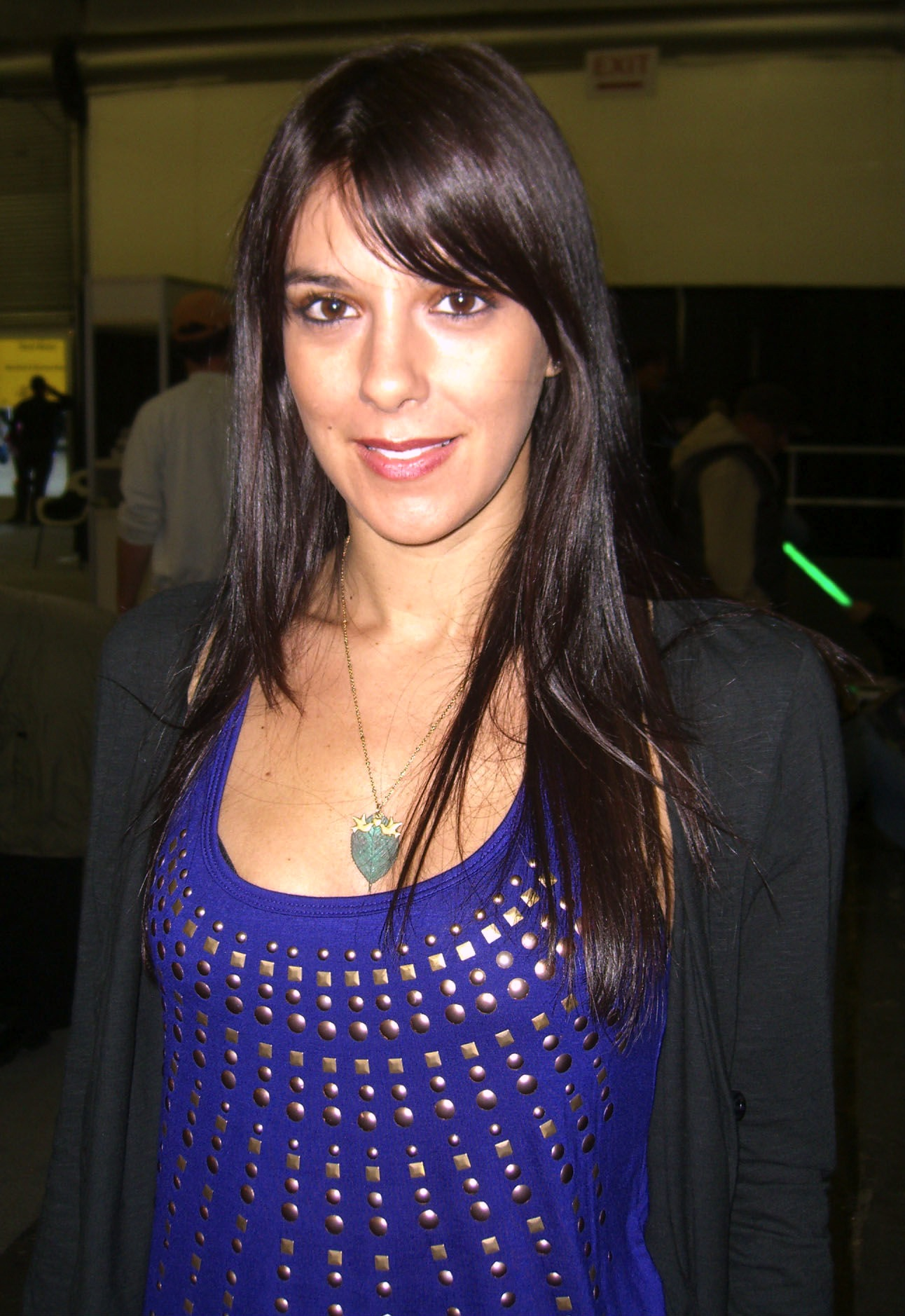
- Morasca at the 2009 Big Apple Convention in Manhattan
- Born: February 15, 1981 (age 45); Pittsburgh, Pennsylvania, U.S.
- Education: Duquesne University, University of Pittsburgh
- Occupations: Actress; model; professional wrestler; television personality
- Known for: Survivor: The Amazon (winner), Survivor: All-Stars, The Amazing Race 19

Jenna Morasca (born February 15, 1981) is an American emergency veterinary nurse supervisor and former actress, swimsuit model, professional wrestler, and reality television personality. She is best known for winning the sixth season of the reality competition series Survivor, Survivor: The Amazon, in 2003. She also appeared on Survivor: All-Stars in 2004, in which she placed 16th, and on the 19th season of The Amazing Race in 2011 along with her then-boyfriend and Survivor: Africa winner Ethan Zohn, in which they placed tenth.

== Early life ==
Jenna Morasca was born in Pittsburgh, Pennsylvania, on February 15, 1981, to Carla and Michael Morasca. She is an only child. Before appearing on Survivor, Morasca was a college student at the University of Pittsburgh, where she was initiated into Zeta Tau Alpha.

Morasca graduated from South Fayette High School in 1999, and studied at Duquesne University for two years before transferring to University of Pittsburgh.

== Survivor ==
=== The Amazon ===
Morasca first competed on Survivor in the show's sixth season, Survivor: The Amazon. Filmed in the Amazon rainforest in 2002. The season's tribes were split by gender so Morasca was initially placed on Jaburu (women's tribe) alongside Deena Bennett, Jeanne Hebert, Janet Koth, Shawna Mitchell, Christy Smith, Heidi Strobel, and Joanna Ward, as its youngest member.

At the beginning of the game, Morasca formed a friendship with Strobel and Mitchell as they were the youngest women on the tribe. Despite her lack of work ethic rubbing some the wrong way, she survived the tribe's two visits to tribal council.

A tribe switch resulted in Morasca, Bennett and Mitchell remaining on Jabaru, now accompanied by Alex Bell, Rob Cesternino, and Matthew von Ertfelda. The new tribe won the following challenge, but lost on day 18 where Mitchell was voted out for her closeness with Bell.

On day 19, the tribes merged into the Jacaré tribe. During the first immunity challenge, Morasca and fellow contestant Strobel stripped off their clothes for peanut butter and chocolate. Morasca's alliance now with Bell, Cesternino and Strobel managed to control multiple votes, namely Roger Sexton, Dave Johnson, and Bennett. At the Final Seven, Cesternino betrayed his alliance by voting out Bell. At the Final Six, Morasca and Strobel scrambled to stay in the game, trying to break up the alliance of Cesternino, Matthew von Ertfelda and Butch Lockley. When Christy Smith would not commit to either side, Cesternino convinced Morasca and Strobel to help vote out Smith, who was later voted off. At the Final Five, Strobel was voted out, but Morasca won the next immunity, allowing her to advance to the Final Three. Morasca, Cesternino and von Ertfelda voted out Lockley. Morasca won the key final immunity challenge which gave her the sole power to eliminate either Cesternino or von Ertfelda and eventually eliminated Cesternino. Morasca beat von Ertfelda in a 6–1 vote to become the Sole Survivor. Morasca was the youngest contestant to ever win Survivor until Jud "Fabio" Birza won Survivor: Nicaragua in 2010, though Morasca remains the youngest female contestant to win Survivor.

=== All-Stars ===
Morasca's winning game got her cast on the show's first all-star edition Survivor: All-Stars. Where she was sorted into the Mogo Mogo tribe alongside Colby Donaldson, Richard Hatch, Shii Ann Huang, Lex van den Berghe, and Kathy Vavrick-O'Brien. Morasca was initially in little danger as her tribe won immunity in the first two episodes. In Episode Three, Morasca decided to quit the game, out of a desire to be with her dying mother, who had been battling cancer for 12 years, making her the third person eliminated from the competition. Her mother died eight days after Morasca returned home.

=== Survivor Live ===
In 2005, Morasca replaced Richard Hatch as co-host (with Dalton Ross) of CBS's Survivor Live, an internet talk show devoted to the then-current season of Survivor. She has since hosted the show throughout five entire seasons - Survivor: Palau, Survivor: Guatemala, Survivor: Panama, Survivor: Cook Islands and Survivor: Fiji.

In 2012, Rob Cesternino held a pageant named 'Miss Survivor', where individuals could vote for their favorite female survivor. Morasca was in the running in 2012 alongside Andrea Boehlke, Amanda Kimmel, Parvati Shallow and Courtney Yates. She went on to lose to Shallow.

== Career ==
Morasca worked as a swimsuit model. As of January 2021, she works as a veterinary nurse.

=== Total Nonstop Action Wrestling (2009) ===
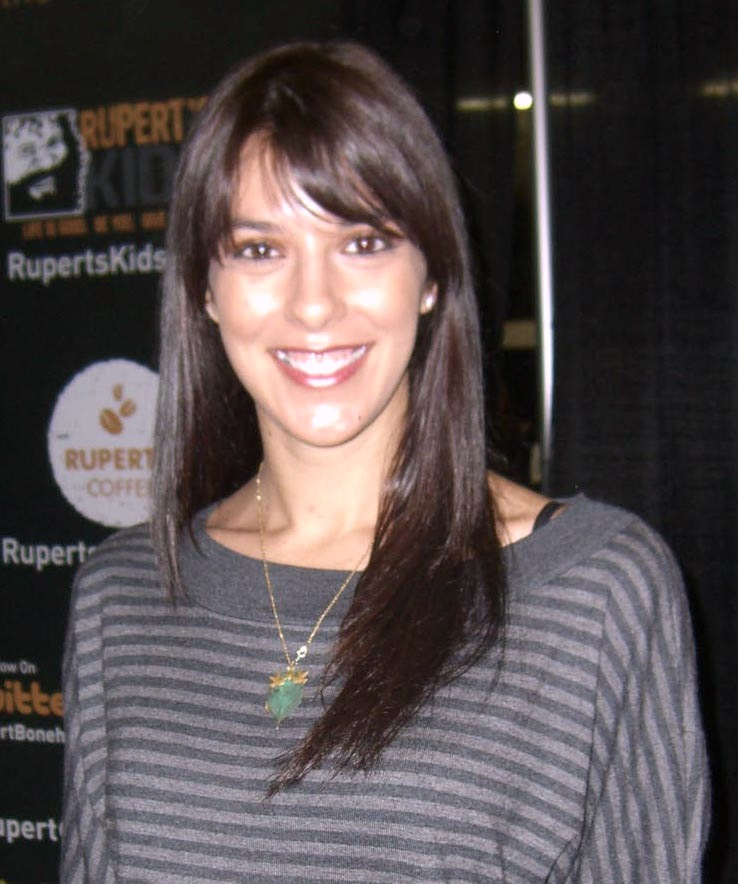
Jenna Morasca at the Big Apple Convention in Manhattan (2009)

Morasca made her professional wrestling debut on the March 12, 2009, episode of Total Nonstop Action Wrestling's TNA Impact! program, in a backstage interview with Mick Foley. She then appeared in backstage segments with Kevin Nash and his alliance The Main Event Mafia. It was later revealed by Kurt Angle that Morasca was the financial backer to the Mafia, and the money she provided was used to lure Samoa Joe to the stable, establishing Morasca as a heel in the process. Morasca was regularly seen bickering with fellow Mafia valet Sharmell, leading to a catfight backstage on the May 28 edition of Impact!.

On the July 9 edition of Impact it was revealed that Morasca had hired Awesome Kong to train her for her upcoming match against Sharmell at Victory Road where she defeated Sharmell. The match was very poorly received, receiving the "Worst Worked Match of the Year" award for 2009 from readers of the Wrestling Observer Newsletter. Figure Four Weekly's Bryan Alvarez, reviewing Victory Road for The Bryan and Vinny Show, called it the worst women's match he had ever seen. Giving it a minus 5-star rating, he said he was unable to remember the last time he had done so because it had been so long since he had seen a match that bad. Reviewing the match for WrestleCrap, "Triple Kelly" Kelly Parmalee called it "the absolute worst wrestling match I have EVER seen in my life" and compared it negatively to "That Jackie Gayda Match" from the July 8, 2002, episode of Monday Night Raw. This would be her only match in wrestling.

=== Other television and film appearances ===
In 2003, Morasca had a part in the Off Broadway play Pieces. In 2004, she was on the board of directors for Animal Friends in Pittsburgh. In 2005, she appeared in a minor role in the made-for-TV movie The Scorned.

Morasca was a contestant on the February 28, 2005, episode of Fear Factor, which starred former reality television contestants. She was eliminated in the second round by Omarosa Manigault-Stallworth.

In October 2006, she appeared in the premiere episode of Celebrity Paranormal Project on VH-1, along with other notables such as Gary Busey.

In 2011, Morasca and her then-boyfriend, fellow Survivor winner Ethan Zohn, participated in the 19th season of The Amazing Race. They checked-in at fourth place in the opening leg. In the second episode, which featured the show's first ever double elimination, Morasca and Zohn arrived at the Pit Stop in ninth place, which would have just spared them from elimination; however, they had to return to the orphanage they visited in that leg to donate all of their money, which resulted in them dropping to tenth-place resulting in their elimination.

Morasca and Zohn also appeared together as guest sous chefs on the seventh episode of the first season of the Food Network show Dinner: Impossible entitled "Stranded: Deserted Island: Impossible", and on the premiere of the fourth season of the Celebrity Apprentice, in which they supported their former Survivor castmate Richard Hatch.

In 2011, Morasca and Zohn also starred in The Watcher, a 20-minute horror movie included in the Drive-In Horror Show series,

=== Modeling ===
Morasca's strip with fellow contestant Heidi Strobel led to a nude pictorial in the August 2003 Playboy magazine.

She also appeared near-nude in an anti-fur ad for PETA with her boyfriend, Survivor: Africa winner Ethan Zohn, that featured the slogan "We'd Rather Go Naked Than Wear Fur!"

Morasca modeled swimwear and was the CEO of a model scouting company called Model Challenge USA, which she founded in 2004.

== Personal life ==
Morasca began dating fellow Survivor champion Ethan Zohn after her victory on Survivor: The Amazon in 2003. They lived in Manhattan, though not together. In an interview on Rob Has a Podcast, it was revealed that Morasca and Zohn were considered to return in Survivor: South Pacific, after applying for The Amazing Race. The couple declined the offer, saying they were not interested in competing against each other. In February 2013, Morasca and Zohn confirmed that they had amicably ended their relationship after ten years together.

On January 25, 2018 in Washington, Pennsylvania, Morasca was allegedly arrested for drug possession and driving under the influence. Per the police report, Morasca was unconscious while the vehicle was stopped at a stop sign, with the engine still running. The person sitting in the vehicle's passenger seat was caught by police putting a plastic baggie with syringes in her purse. When paramedics arrived, they administered naloxone to Morasca, who was physically combative throughout the process, biting a police officer's arm after having been placed in an ambulance. In a January 2021 interview, Morasca commented on the reports of the incident, stating, "Don't believe everything you read." She later explicitly denied she was arrested or charged, writing on her Instagram, "I'm doing great (and I've NEVER been arrested or got a DUI like a million websites like to say)! I had a tough go after my dad died suddenly, but I was able to get myself together and keep moving forward with the help of an incredible support system."

== Championships and accomplishments ==
- Wrestling Observer Newsletter
  - Worst Worked Match of the Year (2009) vs. Sharmell at Victory Road

== Filmography ==
=== Film ===
Year	Title	Role	Notes
2005	The Scorned	Angie	TV movie
2007	Hack!	Tim's Girlfriend	Direct to DVD
2009	End Game	Carol Peterlake	
2009	Drive-In Horrorshow	Cherry	

=== Television ===
Year	Title	Role	Notes
2003	Survivor: The Amazon	Contestant	Winner
2004	Survivor: All-Stars	Contestant	Quit; 16th place
2009	TNA iMPACT! Wrestling	Herself	18 episodes
2011	The Amazing Race 19	Contestant	Eliminated; 10th place (with Ethan Zohn)

Preceded by Brian Heidik	Winner of Survivor; Survivor: The Amazon	Succeeded by Sandra Diaz-Twine
