= Celebrity Paranormal Project =

2006 American television series

- Created by: Cris Abrego; Mark Cronin
- Starring: (See Celebrity Contestants below)
- Country of origin: United States
- Original language: English
- No. of episodes: 8

Production
- Executive producers: Cris Abrego; Mark Cronin; Ben Samek
- Running time: 45 minutes
- Production company: 51 Minds Entertainment

Original release
- Network: VH1
- Release: October 22 – December 17, 2006

Celebrity Paranormal Project (sometimes abbreviated as CPP) is an American paranormal reality television series that originally aired from October 22 to December 17, 2006, on VH1. Except for a different title and use of celebrities, the VH1 show is similar to MTV's Fear. The show has been made available on iTunes and Xbox Live.

== Overview ==
The show consists of four or five celebrity participants who are taken to an allegedly haunted location during the night and left until sunrise with the task of identifying paranormal activity. Upon arrival they are given a brief history of the location as well as other background information on past ghost sightings. The celebrities are left with specialist equipment such as infrared cameras and EMF meters. Surveillance cameras are set up all around to record what happens in the building that is to be investigated.

To begin, two of the celebrities go on an exploration of a certain area of the location while the rest of the team remains at the surveillance station. The job of people at the surveillance station is to guide the other two towards an individual site. The two that have entered must complete tasks to "stir up the paranormal" during an allotted time using the equipment provided. After completing their tasks they return to base camp.

Two more celebrities then take their turn inside a different part of the location doing the same types of things that the previous couple did. There are a total of three or four explorations during the show, depending on the location. This number of explorations leads to some celebrities entering twice. The purpose of the explorations is to find the "heart of the haunting" — the greatest concentration of paranormal energy within the location. This location is chosen by the entire group of celebrities at the end of the show.

The participants then decide amongst themselves who has the strongest connection with the paranormal. Once decided, the entire group enters the "heart of the haunting" one final time together. They bring with them a scroll, a book with instructions, and an item used to contact a select spirit. From there, the person who made the strongest connection with the paranormal acts as the conduit to the other world in an attempt to get the spirit to enter their own body. After that experience the show ends and the group says goodbye to the haunted site.

== Equipment ==
- EMF meter
- Infrared thermometer
- Thermal imaging camera
- Digital recorder for recording electronic voice phenomenons (EVP)

== Episodes ==
Episode #	Location	Celebrity Contestants
1 - "In Sanatorium"	Waverly Hills Sanatorium	Hal Sparks, Donna D'Errico, Toccara Jones, Gary Busey and Jenna Morasca
2 - "Pearl"	Warson Asylum for the Criminally Insane* (Real Location: Norwich State Hospital, Connecticut)	Godfrey, Traci Bingham, Rachel Hunter, Tony Little and Ethan Zohn
3 - "The First Warden"	The Walls Maximum Security Prison* (Real Location: Tennessee State Prison)	Picabo Street, Michael Bergin, Mariel Hemingway, Tonya Cooley, and Joe Piscopo
4 - "Mad Ray"	Warson Asylum for the Criminally Insane* (Real Location: Norwich State Hospital, Connecticut)	Traci Lords, Evan Farmer, Kimberly Caldwell, Gilbert Gottfried, and Jeremiah Trotter
5 - "Tanner's Ghost"	Hawthorne Mill* (Real Location: Ayers Island Mill)	David Carradine, Coolio, Andrew Firestone, Mia St. John, and Bridget Marquardt
6 - "Wooden Lucy"	Hawthorne Mill* (Real Location: Ayers Island Mill)	Eric Nies, Nicole Eggert, Ernie Hudson, Courtney Friel, and Willie Garson
7 - "Cult Commune"	The Susurro Canyon Comune	Evander Holyfield, Debra Wilson, Julio Iglesias Jr., Nikki Schieler Ziering, and Jason "Wee-Man" Acuña
8 - "Dead Men Walking"	The Walls Maximum Security Prison* (Real Location: Tennessee State Prison)	Adrianne Curry, Christopher Knight, Danny Bonaduce, and Gretchen Bonaduce

* Denotes real location name not used
