= Ethan Zohn =

American television personality (born 1973)

- Born: November 12, 1973 (age 52)
- Occupations: Motivational speaker, soccer player, television personality
- Television: Survivor: Africa (Winner); Survivor: All-Stars; The Amazing Race 19; Survivor: Winners at War
- Spouse: Lisa Heywood (m. 2016)
- Partner: Jenna Morasca (2003–2013)
- Website: www.ezohn.com

Ethan Zohn (born November 12, 1973) is an American motivational speaker, former professional soccer player, and reality television personality who won Survivor: Africa, the third season of the reality TV series Survivor. He went on to compete in Survivor: All-Stars and Survivor: Winners at War, placing 11th and 18th, respectively, as well as on the 19th season of The Amazing Race in 2011 along with his then-girlfriend and Survivor: The Amazon winner Jenna Morasca, in which they placed tenth.

After winning Survivor: Africa, Zohn co-founded Grassroot Soccer, an adolescent health organization that uses soccer to engage young people around navigating their most pressing health challenges, including HIV/AIDS and mental health. In 2010, he ranked 14th in USL Second Division's Top 15 of the Decade list as one of the most influential players of the United Soccer League Second Division in the previous decade.

== Soccer ==
Zohn was a soccer goalkeeper at Lexington High School and Vassar College, and played professionally for the Hawaii Tsunami and Cape Cod Crusaders of the United Soccer Leagues and in Zimbabwe for Highlanders F.C.

Shortly after winning Survivor Africa, Zohn was hired by ESPN to serve as a sideline reporter for the US National Team's matches in the 2002 FIFA World Cup. In 2005, he began co-hosting the Metro Soccer Report (later renamed MSG Soccer Report) on the MSG Network, a weekly show dedicated to New York Red Bulls (formerly MetroStars) of Major League Soccer. The following year, Zohn began hosting FC Fox on the Fox Soccer Channel.

=== Grassroot Soccer ===
Inspired by his experience witnessing the devastating effects of HIV while playing professional football in Zimbabwe, Zohn donated some of his winnings from Survivor Africa to co-found Grassroot Soccer, an organization whose mission is to "leverage the power of soccer to equip young people with the life-saving information, services, and mentorship they need to live healthier lives".

Grassroot Soccer incorporates soccer and fun into interactive activities that equip young people with the tools to tackle the most critical and interrelated health challenges facing them including mental health, HIV/AIDS, gender-based violence, and issues around sexual and reproductive health such as teen pregnancy. Grassroot Soccer programs have reached more than 25 million young people in more than 60 countries, building their assets (health knowledge and the confidence to use it), improving their access to high-quality health services, and increasing their adherence to crucial treatments and healthy behaviors.

For his combined humanitarian efforts to spread HIV education throughout Africa via soccer teams for youth and young adults, Zohn received the Courage of Conscience Award from The Peace Abbey in Sherborn, Massachusetts.

== Survivor ==
=== Africa ===
As part of the Boran tribe, Zohn did not become an immediate target in the game; he was seen as a strong player who could potentially help to win many tribal immunities. When his tribe lost two back-to-back immunity challenges, Zohn joined the majority to vote off Diane Ogden and Jessie Camacho in episodes one and two. Over the next few days, Zohn would form a long-term alliance with Lex Van den Berghe and Tom Buchanan from his Boran tribe.

However, a twist in episode five saw both of Zohn's alliance members and Kelly Goldsmith switch from Boran to the Samburu tribe, leaving Ethan alone with fellow Boran members Kim Johnson and Clarence Black. Two of the new Boran members from the Samburu tribe, Teresa Cooper and Frank Garrison, had an old misunderstanding with another former Samburu member, Silas Gaither. So, by consensus, after Zohn's tribe lost the immunity challenge Gaither was voted out. Both of Zohn's alliance members Buchanan and Van den Berghe remained safe on the Samburu tribe, carrying all three into the merge.

Zohn's alliance soon began to control the game, with other members Johnson and Goldsmith. They immediately targeted Black due to his physical strength, among other events that had occurred earlier in the game, and he was voted out. But Van den Berghe had received another vote at tribal council, a vote he believed had come from Goldsmith, but which actually came from Cooper. This led Van den Berghe on a witch-hunt against Goldsmith which almost led to the demise of Zohn's alliance when Goldsmith possessed the power with the other four ex-Samburu members, Cooper, Garrison, Kim Powers and Brandon Quinton. But at the last minute, Quinton switched his vote, saving Van den Berghe, and voting out Goldsmith. But this move came back to haunt Quinton when Zohn's alliance saw him as untrustworthy and voted Quinton out at the next tribal council.

Zohn, Van den Berghe, Buchanan, and Johnson regained control of the game, outing previous Samburu members Garrison, Powers and Cooper in the next three tribal councils, carrying them into the final four. At the next immunity challenge, Johnson, the next target to be voted out, won immunity, leading to the alliance having to resort to voting one of their own out, despite the fact that the challenge contained some controversy. At any rate, Zohn joined Van den Berghe and Johnson in voting out Buchanan, carrying them into the Final Three.

At the final three immunity challenge, older tribe member Johnson outlasted the two young, fit men to win immunity in an endurance challenge. With Johnson holding the power to choose who she would sit next to in the Final Two, she chose Zohn.

In the end, Zohn beat out Johnson in a 5–2 vote to become the Sole Survivor, gaining the votes of Goldsmith, Garrison, Cooper, Buchanan, and Van den Berghe.

=== All-Stars ===
Zohn was invited to participate in Survivor: All-Stars, which he gladly accepted. Originally part of the Saboga tribe, Zohn was immediately targeted as a previous winner, along with Survivor: The Australian Outback winner Tina Wesson. When Saboga lost immunity, the rest of the tribe decided to vote out Wesson first, needing Zohn's strength to win future challenges. When Saboga lost immunity once again, Zohn was spared once more over physical liability Rudy Boesch, who had hurt his ankle previously.

In Episode 5, Zohn and the rest of the Saboga tribe were disbanded after losing a challenge. Zohn and Jerri Manthey joined the Mogo Mogo tribe, while Jenna Lewis and Rupert Boneham joined Chapera. Later in that episode, Zohn joined the rest of his new tribe to vote out Survivor: Borneo winner Richard Hatch.

In Episode 7, Zohn was on the outs when the alliance of Manthey, Lex Van den Berghe, and Shii Ann Huang left him out in their decision to vote out Colby Donaldson. Zohn was shocked at the decision, feeling betrayed by old Survivor: Africa alliance member Van den Berghe.

In Episode 8, Mogo Mogo lost immunity once again, and Zohn, the last former winner, was the sixth person voted out in 11th place, and the eighth person eliminated overall, by a vote of 4–1. He was the most successful of the four previous winners who competed on All-Stars, lasting longer than Wesson, Hatch, and Jenna Morasca, who quit the game on day 9 to be with her ailing mother.

=== Winners at War ===
Zohn returned as a contestant on the fortieth season of Survivor, Survivor: Winners at War, where he was a member of the Sele tribe. Along with All-Stars castmate Amber Mariano, Zohn broke Kelly Wiglesworth's record for the longest gap between seasons. He was placed on the Sele tribe, joining an alliance of "Old-School" players formed by Rob Mariano and Parvati Shallow. Zohn was targeted by Jeremy Collins and Michele Fitzgerald shortly after as a ploy to weaken Mariano and Shallow, and he was the fourth person voted out. Zohn remained at the Edge of Extinction for the remaining duration of the season, during which he openly spoke out about his health issues and his drive to never give up. Zohn was defeated by Tyson Apostol and Natalie Anderson respectively at the two Edge return challenges and became a permanent member of the jury on day 35. He later voted for Anderson to win the season, although she finished second to Tony Vlachos.

In 2022, the Jewish Journal named Zohn one of "The Top 10 Jewish Reality TV Stars of All Time."

== Other media appearances ==
Zohn was a contestant on a February 28, 2005, episode of Fear Factor, where he competed against other reality TV competition winners, including his then-girlfriend Jenna Morasca, who was the winner of Survivor: The Amazon. Zohn finished second, losing to former Bachelorette winner Ryan Sutter. Later that year, he appeared on Kill Reality, which followed various reality television personalities as they filmed a horror movie called The Scorned.

In October 2006, Zohn appeared on an episode of the VH1 series Celebrity Paranormal Project. He and his team investigated alleged paranormal activity at the Warson Asylum for the Criminally Insane.

In 2008, Zohn hosted Earth Tripping, a six-episode TV series, in which he demonstrated how to be "an earth-friendly traveler", and shows viewers "how to employ new, natural and environmentally conscious methods when they travel". During the series Zohn visited New York City, Mexico City, Singapore, Kuala Lumpur, Santiago, Chile, and Buenos Aires, Argentina.

In 2011, Zohn and his longtime girlfriend and fellow Survivor winner Jenna Morasca participated in the 19th season of The Amazing Race. They were one of the two teams eliminated in the double-elimination leg and finished 10th for the season after two legs.

Zohn appeared in the 11th episode of the Discovery Channel show PitchMen, in which he presented the EZ Crunch Bowl, a cereal bowl he designed to in which the cereal is kept in the shallow end and the milk in the deeper end in order to keep the cereal from becoming soggy. The bowl was picked by the show's co-stars, Billy Mays and Anthony Sullivan, for manufacturing and marketing by Telebrands. The EZ Crunch Bowl was sent to Telebrands product engineers for improvement before being made available to the public.

Zohn has co-hosted Outside Today on the cable TV network Outside Television.

In 2024, Zohn appeared as a guest on the Dropout series Dirty Laundry with fellow Survivor contestants Natalie Bolton, Cirie Fields, and Parvati Shallow.

== Personal life ==
Zohn is Jewish. His father died from cancer when he was 14 years old.

On April 30, 2002, Zohn called into the Howard Stern Show and shared he was working as a motivational speaker, often in Jewish venues where he shared how Judaism helped him achieve success. He also revealed he had gone on five dates with Jennifer Love Hewitt after meeting her back stage at the Live With Regis and Kelly show, and the two were regularly in touch by telephone (at the time).

Zohn began dating fellow Survivor champion Jenna Morasca after her victory on Survivor: The Amazon in 2003. They both lived in Manhattan. In an interview on Rob Has a Podcast, it was revealed that Zohn and Morasca were considered to return in Survivor: South Pacific, after applying for The Amazing Race. The couple declined the offer, saying they were not interested in competing against each other. In February 2013, Zohn and Morasca confirmed that they had amicably ended their relationship. On July 21, 2015, Zohn announced his engagement to New York City interior designer Lisa Heywood. They were married on July 16, 2016, in North Bennington, Vermont, in a Jewish ceremony. Zohn and his wife advocate a paleo diet.

On April 30, 2009, Zohn was diagnosed with a rare type of cancer called CD20-positive Hodgkin's lymphoma. He started chemotherapy in May 2009. On September 14, 2009, Zohn disclosed that after three months of intensive chemotherapy, his cancer returned. He underwent a new treatment, including a stem-cell transplant, to battle the rare form of Hodgkin's disease. Zohn received a "clean CT scan" in late April 2010 and remained in remission for nearly 20 months. In September 2011, Zohn confirmed that the cancer had returned in his chest. In early March 2013, Zohn announced via The Jeff Probst Show that he was cancer-free due to two rounds of stem cell transplants that he received from his brother.

As of May 2021, Zohn lives in Hillsboro, New Hampshire.

== Filmography ==
=== Television ===
Year	Title	Role	Notes
2001–02	Survivor: Africa	Contestant	Winner
2004	Survivor: All-Stars	Contestant	Eliminated; 11th place
2005	Fear Factor	Contestant	Eliminated; 2nd place
2005	Kill Reality	Himself	
2006	Celebrity Paranormal Project	Himself	Episode: "Pearl"
2009	PitchMen	Himself	Episode: "Crunch Time"
2011	The Amazing Race 19	Contestant	Eliminated; 10th place (with Jenna Morasca)
2020	Survivor: Winners at War	Contestant	Eliminated; 18th place
2024	Dirty Laundry	Contestant	Episode: "Who Was Part of a Ritual to Ward Off Evil Spirits?"

=== Film ===
Year	Title	Role	Notes
2005	The Scorned	Murry	

Preceded by Tina Wesson	Winner of Survivor; Survivor: Africa	Succeeded by Vecepia Towery
