= Survivor: Africa =

- Season 3
- Region 1 DVD cover
- Presented by: Jeff Probst
- No. of days: 39
- No. of castaways: 16
- Winner: Ethan Zohn
- Runner-up: Kim Johnson
- Location: Shaba National Reserve, Kenya
- No. of episodes: 15

Release
- Original network: CBS
- Original release: October 11, 2001 – January 10, 2002

Additional information
- Filming dates: July 11 – August 18, 2001

Season chronology
- ← Previous; The Australian Outback Next → Marquesas

Survivor: Africa is the third season of the American CBS competitive reality television series Survivor. The season was filmed from July 11, 2001, to August 18, 2001, in Kenya's Shaba National Reserve, and was aired weekly from October 11, 2001, until the live finale on January 10, 2002. Ethan Zohn was named Sole Survivor over Kim Johnson by a jury vote of 5–2 and won the $1,000,000 grand prize. He became the first Jewish winner. The season featured a cast of 16 participants split between two tribes, Boran and Samburu. Three of the castaways—Zohn, Lex van den Berghe, and Tom Buchanan—all returned for future seasons. The season received more criticism than previous seasons due to the harsh living conditions of the African desert and the small amount of food for participants.

== Format ==
Survivor is a reality television show created by Mark Burnett and Charlie Parsons and based on the Swedish show Expedition Robinson. The series follows a number of participants who are isolated in a remote location, where they must provide food, fire, and shelter for themselves. Every three days, one participant is removed from the series by majority vote, with challenges being held to give a reward (ranging from living and food-related prizes to a car) and immunity from being voted off the show. The last remaining player is awarded a prize of $1,000,000.

== Contestants ==
The show's cast consists of 16 players who are divided into tribes named Boran and Samburu for the real-life Borana and Samburu tribes. After 12 days, three members of each team switched to the other tribe in what became known as the first "twist" in Survivor. When 10 contestants remained, the two tribes were merged into the Moto Maji tribe, which was named for the Swahili words for "fire" and "water".

List of Survivor: Africa contestants
Contestant	Age	From	Tribe			Finish	
Contestant	Age	From	Original	Switched	Merged	Placement	Day
Diane Ogden	42	Lincoln, Nebraska	Boran			1st voted out	Day 3
Jessie Camacho	26	Orlando, Florida	Boran			2nd voted out	Day 6
Carl Bilancione	46	Winter Springs, Florida	Samburu			3rd voted out	Day 9
Linda Spencer	44	Boston, Massachusetts	Samburu			4th voted out	Day 12
Silas Gaither	23	Los Angeles, California	Samburu	Boran		5th voted out	Day 15
Lindsey Richter	26	Portland, Oregon	Samburu	Samburu		6th voted out	Day 18
Clarence Black	24	Detroit, Michigan	Boran	Boran	Moto Maji	7th voted out	Day 21
Kelly Goldsmith	22	San Diego, California	Boran	Samburu	Moto Maji	8th voted out 1st jury member	Day 24
Brandon Quinton	25	Dallas, Texas	Samburu	Samburu	Moto Maji	9th voted out 2nd jury member	Day 27
Frank Garrison	43	Odessa, New York	Samburu	Boran	Moto Maji	10th voted out 3rd jury member	Day 30
Kim Powers	29	Conshohocken, Pennsylvania	Samburu	Samburu	Moto Maji	11th voted out 4th jury member	Day 33
Teresa Cooper	42	Jackson, Georgia	Samburu	Boran	Moto Maji	12th voted out 5th jury member	Day 36
Tom Buchanan	45	Rich Valley, Virginia	Boran	Samburu	Moto Maji	13th voted out 6th jury member	Day 37
Lex van den Berghe	38	Santa Cruz, California	Boran	Samburu	Moto Maji	14th voted out 7th jury member	Day 38
Kim Johnson	56	Oyster Bay, New York	Boran	Boran	Moto Maji	Runner-up	Day 39
Ethan Zohn	27	New York City, New York	Boran	Boran	Moto Maji	Sole Survivor	Day 39

=== Future appearances ===
Since the broadcast of Survivor: Africa, Ethan Zohn competed again with Lex van den Berghe and Tom Buchanan on Survivor: All-Stars. Zohn also competed on Survivor: Winners at War. In 2015, Teresa Cooper was included on the public poll to choose the cast of Survivor: Cambodia but was not chosen to compete.

Outside of Survivor, Zohn competed on a "Reality All-Stars" episode of Fear Factor, and also competed on The Amazing Race 19 with then-girlfriend and fellow Survivor winner Jenna Morasca.

== Season summary ==
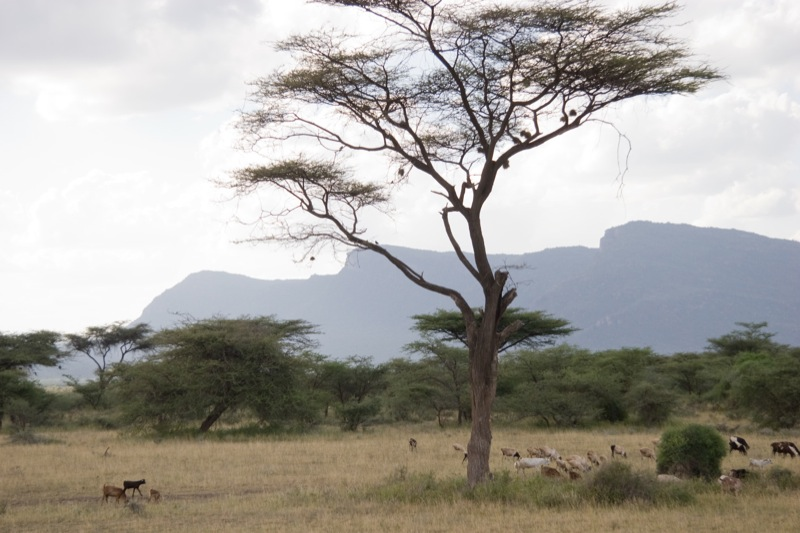
The Shaba National Reserve in Kenya

The 16 castaways were split into tribes named Samburu and Boran, and were given camps that included fencing to help protect them from wildlife. Samburu took an early lead but the tribe was internally divided along age lines – Silas, Kim Powers, Brandon, and Lindsey as one, and Frank, Teresa, Carl, and Linda as the other. At their first Tribal Council, the age blocs left a stalemate tie between Carl and Lindsey, and with no previous votes to count, a quiz was used. Lindsay won and put the younger members in control. On the next visit to Tribal Council, Linda was eliminated and both tribes were even at six members. On day 13, the tribes were given a vague clue about sending three members on a quest but were unaware this would be the first tribal swap. Silas picked himself and the remaining older Samburu, Frank and Teresa. Kelly, Tom, and Lex were picked for Boran. After being informed of the tribal swap, these players joined their new tribes; Frank and Teresa quickly went to work with the original Boran members to eliminate Silas while the original Boran members on Samburu learned of Lindsay's past votes and were able to eliminate her.

Once 10 players remained – six from the original Boran and four from Samburu – the tribes were merged into a single tribe called Moto Maji. Samburu members were aware that the Boran players were sticking with original alliances and scrambled to stay in. During the first post-merger Tribal Council, a mystery vote was cast for Lex, sending him on a witch hunt. Deciding it had been Kelly, a member of his alliance who had voted against him, Lex asked his alliance to turn against one of their own. When Kelly found out what was going to happen, she banded with the Samburu members, but Lex had also persuaded Brandon to vote with his alliance, leading to Kelly's elimination. Brandon's disloyalty to Samburu led to his elimination and that of the other remaining Samburu members.

The final four players were Ethan, Lex, Tom, and Kim Johnson. Kim won the last two immunity challenges, Tom was voted out, and then Lex was voted out by Kim's vote. At the final Tribal Council, Kim was praised for surviving the game but was accused of riding the coattails of Lex, Ethan, and Tom. Ethan was praised for his likeability and integrity, and the jury voted Ethan the Sole Survivor in a 5–2 vote.

Challenge winners and eliminations by episode
Episode			Challenge winner(s)		Eliminated	
No.	Title	Original air date	Reward	Immunity	Tribe	Player
1	"Question of Trust"	October 11, 2001	Samburu		Boran	Diane
2	"Who's Zooming Whom?"	October 18, 2001	Samburu	Samburu	Boran	Jessie
3	"The Gods Are Angry"	October 25, 2001	Boran	Boran	Samburu	Carl
4	"The Young and Untrusted"	November 1, 2001	Samburu	Boran	Samburu	Linda
5	"The Twist"	November 8, 2001	Boran	Samburu	Boran	Silas
6	"I'd Never Do It To You"	November 15, 2001	Samburu	Boran	Samburu	Lindsey
7	"Will There Be a Feast Tonight?"	November 22, 2001	Ethan (Note: There was no reward challenge due to the merge.)	Teresa	Moto Maji	Clarence
8	"The First 21 Days"	November 29, 2001	Recap Episode			
9	"Smoking Out the Snake"	December 6, 2001	Ethan [Lex]	Ethan	Moto Maji	Kelly
10	"Dinner, Movie and a Betrayal"	December 13, 2001	Brandon, Frank	Lex	Moto Maji	Brandon
11	"We Are Family"	December 20, 2001	Survivor Auction	Lex	Moto Maji	Frank
12	"The Big Adventure"	December 27, 2001	Lex [Tom]	Tom	Moto Maji	Kim P.
13	"Truth Be Told"	January 3, 2002	Lex	Lex	Moto Maji	Teresa
14	"The Final Four: No Regrets"	January 10, 2002	None	Kim J.	Moto Maji	Tom
14	"The Final Four: No Regrets"	January 10, 2002	None	Kim J.	Moto Maji	Lex
15	"The Reunion"	January 10, 2002				

In the case of multiple tribes or castaways who win reward or immunity, they are listed in order of finish, or alphabetically where it was a team effort; where one castaway won and invited others, the invitees are in brackets.

== Episodes ==
No. overall	No. in season	Title	CBS recap	Original release date	U.S. viewers (millions)	Rating/share (18–49)
31	1	"Question of Trust"	Recap	September 13, 2001	23.84	10.4/20
32	2	"Who's Zooming Whom?"	Recap	September 20, 2001	19.59	7.9/20
33	3	"The Gods Are Angry"	Recap	September 27, 2001	20.43	8.0/20
34	4	"The Young and Untrusted"	Recap	October 4, 2001	18.73	7.8/18
35	5	"The Twist"	Recap	October 11, 2001	20.55	8.3/20
36	6	"I'd Never Do It to You"	Recap	October 18, 2001	19.71	8.1/21
37	7	"Will There Be a Feast Tonight?"	Recap	October 25, 2001	17.70	6.6/18
38	8	"The First 21 Days"	N/A	November 1, 2001	17.80	7.1/18
39	9	"Smoking Out the Snake"	Recap	November 8, 2001	19.28	7.9/21
40	10	"Dinner, Movie and a Betrayal"	Recap	November 15, 2001	18.39	7.3/20
41	11	"We Are Family"	Recap	November 22, 2001	19.60	7.7/22
42	12	"The Big Adventure"	Recap	November 29, 2001	18.92	7.5/20
43	13	"Truth Be Told"	Recap	December 6, 2001	21.31	8.7/20
44	14	"The Final Four: No Regrets"	Recap	December 13, 2001	27.26	11.3/25
45	15	"The Reunion"	N/A	December 20, 2001	19.05	8.7/20

== Voting history ==
	Original tribes						Switched tribes				Merged tribe							
Episode	1	2	3			4	5	6			7	9	10	11	12	13	14	
Day	3	6	9			12	15	18			21	24	27	30	33	36	37	38
Tribe	Boran	Boran	Samburu			Samburu	Boran	Samburu			Moto Maji	Moto Maji	Moto Maji	Moto Maji	Moto Maji	Moto Maji	Moto Maji	Moto Maji
Eliminated	Diane	Jessie	Tie (Note: The first Tribal Council vote resulted in a tie. A second vote was held where the castaways involved in the tie would not vote and the remaining castaways could only vote for those who tied.)	Tie (Note: After two rounds of voting between Lindsey and Carl, Tribal Council remained tied. As this was Samburu's first Tribal Council, no castaway had prior votes and a countback could not be called. Lindsey and Carl competed in a nature quiz tiebreaker, which Carl lost.)	Carl	Linda	Silas	Tie	Tie (Note: After two tied votes between Lindsey and Tom, a Tribal Council countback was called as a tiebreaker. Tom had no previous votes but Lindsey had four, therefore Lindsey was eliminated.)	Lindsey	Clarence	Kelly	Brandon	Frank	Kim P.	Teresa	Tom	Lex
Vote	6–2	5–2	4–4	3–3	Challenge	4–3	5–1	3–3	2–2	Countback	8–2	5–4	6–2	6–1	4–2	4–1	3–1	1–0
Voter	Votes																	
Ethan	Diane	Jessie					Silas				Clarence	Kelly	Brandon	Frank	Kim P.	Teresa	Tom	None (Note: Ethan and Lex did not vote, as the only eligible players they could only vote for each other.)
Kim J.	Diane	Jessie					Silas				Clarence	Kelly	Brandon	Frank	Kim P.	Teresa	Tom	Lex
Lex	Diane	Jessie						Lindsey	Lindsey		Clarence	Kelly	Frank	Frank	Kim P.	Teresa	Tom	None
Tom	Clarence	Clarence						Lindsey	None (Note: This player was not eligible to vote in the second round of voting.)	0 Votes	Clarence	Kelly	Brandon	Frank	Kim P.	Teresa	Lex	
Teresa			Lindsey	Lindsey		Silas	Silas				Lex	Lex	Brandon	Frank	Lex	Tom		
Kim P.			Carl	Carl		Linda		Tom	Tom		Clarence	Lex	Brandon	Frank	Lex			
Frank			Lindsey	Lindsey		Silas	Silas				Clarence	Lex	Brandon	Kim J.				
Brandon			Carl	Carl		Linda		Tom	Tom		Clarence	Kelly	Frank					
Kelly	Diane	Jessie						Lindsey	Lindsey		Clarence	Lex						
Clarence	Diane	Jessie					Silas				Lex							
Lindsey			Carl	None	Won	Linda		Tom	None	4 Votes								
Silas			Carl	Carl		Linda	Frank											
Linda			Lindsey	Lindsey		Silas												
Carl			Lindsey	None	Lost													
Jessie	Diane	Clarence																
Diane	Clarence																	

Jury vote
Episode	15	
Day	39	
Finalist	Ethan	Kim J.
Votes	5–2	
Juror	Votes	
Lex	Yes	
Tom	Yes	
Teresa	Yes	
Kim P.		Yes
Frank	Yes	
Brandon		Yes
Kelly	Yes	

== Production ==
Filming of Survivor: Africa took place from July 11, 2001, to August 18, 2001, in Kenya's Shaba National Reserve. The show was broadcast from October 11, 2001, until January 10, 2002, on CBS.

== Reception ==
Survivor: Africa received much more criticism than the two previous seasons, primarily for the contestants' tough living conditions during filming. Dalton Ross of Entertainment Weekly ranked it as the ninth-worst season of the series, saying aside from "Some great challenges, not that much else was great". Tom Santilli of Examiner.com ranked it 26th, saying following Borneo and Australian Outback, "it was a complete dud at the time", while noting winner Ethan Zohn "was just so-so and not that interesting", and that the cast's "lethargy showed on screen" due to the poor conditions in the filming location. In 2020, fan site "The Purple Rock Podcast" also ranked the season 29th, and said it "suffers because of its location" and that "the cast on this season is generally pretty decent, and probably would have been much better if they weren't constantly sapped of energy by lack of food and water". In 2015, a poll by Rob Has a Podcast ranked Survivor: Africa 19th out of 30 with Rob Cesternino ranking this season 26th. This was updated in 2021 during Cesternino's podcast "Survivor All-Time Top 40 Rankings", ranking Survivor: Africa 21st out of 40. In 2013, Andrea Deiher of Zap2it ranked the season the fifth-worst before it was replaced in 2015 by Survivor: San Juan del Sur. In 2020, Inside Survivor ranked this season 23rd out of 40, saying; "Is it the most dynamic season in terms of gameplay? No. But it is rich in character." In 2024, Nick Caruso of TVLine ranked this season 36th out of 47.

== Controversy ==
Controversy surrounded an immunity challenge in the final episode of Survivor: Africa. In the "Fallen Comrades" challenge, in which the contestants were quizzed on trivia about their fellow players who had been voted out, the final question is "Which female contestant has no piercings?". The official answer, given by Kim Johnson to win the challenge, was Kelly. Lex answered Lindsey, who, unbeknownst to the producers, also had no piercings. Had Lex been given credit for his correct answer, he and Kim would have tied and faced tie-breaker questions. After the producers were alerted to the mistake, both third-place finisher Lex and fourth-place finisher Tom were awarded the $100,000 runner-up prize instead of the usual third- and fourth-place earnings.
