= Helen Glover (Survivor contestant) =

American reality TV contestant

- Born: Helen Olds; April 28, 1955 (age 71); Honolulu, Hawaii
- Occupation: Survival swim instructor
- Television: Survivor: Thailand
- Spouses: Doug Fehmel (m. 1973, divorced) Jim Glover (m. 1982)

Helen Glover (born April 28, 1955 in Honolulu, Hawaii; née Olds) is an American contestant of Survivor: Thailand, the fifth season of an American reality television series Survivor. She also is a former host of her radio talk show.

== Life ==
Helen Olds was born in Honolulu, Hawaii, the second child of three siblings. Olds's father served as an officer of the United States Marine Corps. She attended four different high schools in various US states, including Rogers High School (Newport, Rhode Island) in her junior year. Throughout her high school years, she had been admonished "for talking too much." Olds's father envisioned her as a potential Marine, but after experience in moving around various places, she had aspired a stable lifestyle and family.

Olds married her first husband Doug Fehmel at age eighteen in Virginia Beach, Virginia, where she lived with her family. She bore a son Matthew and then moved with Doug and Matthew back to Newport in January 1978, one month before a blizzard affecting the northeastern US. The marriage then ended, but she remained in Newport as a waitress and a pastry chef.

Olds then remarried Jim Glover in 1982, whom she met and worked with at the Spindrift, a restaurant in Newport. Glover then bore a daughter Katherine from the newer marriage.

Glover then became a survival swim instructor for the United States Navy after word of mouth from a Navy SEAL at a course for water safety instructors. (Note: Also before Survivor, she was previously a self-employed caterer and a lifeguard.) After she obtained the job, the Navy trained her swimming and instructor skills further.

Glover resides in Middletown, Rhode Island, with her current husband Jim, daughter Katherine, son Matthew who served as a US Marine captain, and one stepdaughter. Her son Matthew participated in the Iraq War, was stationed at Camp Lejeune (North Carolina), and has a daughter Alison.

== Survivor: Thailand (2002) ==
Glover, a swim instructor for the Navy at the time, first appeared on Survivor: Thailand (2002), the fifth season of Survivor. Before being cast, she filled an application that her husband Jim downloaded from internet and then submitted it.

At the start, she became one of the seven members handpicked by the oldest female contestant of Thailand, Jan Gentry, to form the Chuay Gahn tribe. Jim appeared as Glover's "loved one" for one of the season's challenges. There, to earn "a 24-hour visit with" her, he had to eat "ants, a tarantula and a scorpion". After betraying other players, Glover became the thirteen person voted off unanimously by three other remaining competitors, finishing fourth and making her the sixth jury member.

Eventual winner Brian Heidik formed the secret alliance with other remaining players Jan Gentry and Clay Jordan. Heidik believed Glover to be "a bigger threat" and badgered Gentry into voting Glover out. Glover was voted the "third most[-]popular contestant" of the Thailand season per an online poll conducted by CBS.

In 2005, Survivor host and producer Jeff Probst named Glover one of "the least likable final four ever" and ranked the season last out of the series's first nine seasons.

== 2004 dismissal from The Providence Journal ==
As Glover revealed in her March 11, 2004, column of The Providence Journal, a contestant voted off the game would "receive a meal, shower, room and a visit from the staff psychiatrist". CBS emailed to her, saying that the column violated an agreement prohibiting contestants from revealing "methods of production" of the series. Nonetheless, CBS would allow contestants to discuss "what's already been broadcast or mak[e] predictions", and Glover agreed to let CBS review her columns before publication. However, the Journal's policies prohibited submitting works to "institutions outside the newspaper" for approval, so the Journal decidedly dropped her column.

== Radio career (2004–12) ==
Self-declared right-leaning "middle-aged white woman with an opinion," Glover began her radio career in summer 2004 by performing commentaries about Survivor. She then substituted for Arlene Violet, who enjoyed Glover's commentaries and invited her to do so, and whom Glover admired as her "role model", on Violet's afternoon WHJJ (920 AM) radio show. Then WHJJ offered her as one of the stations' candidates to trial the 10 a.m.–2 p.m. time slot formerly occupied by John DePetro, who left the station on August 6, 2004, for a Boston AM station WRKO. (Before her, many of other WHJJ hosts temporarily tried out DePetro's former time slot.)

In September 2005, Glover started hosting her own 10 a.m.–1 p.m. talk show on WHJJ, (Note: Glover's eponymous radio show was called The Helen Glover Show.) pushing Jerry Springer's syndicated radio show Springer on the Radio out of the time slot. She earned an award from the Associated Press in no later than March 2006 as the "top show in Rhode Island and Southeastern Massachusetts." Throughout the show's run, she had expressed her "conservative" and "provocative" views about controversial topics, like illegal immigration and sexual predators released from prison. In response to Glover's commentary about illegal immigration, Olivia Geiger of a local coalition Immigrants United called Glover via the radio show but then received less-than-positive reception from Glover's audience.

Of all her guests, Glover interviewed in-person Donald Carcieri, the then-incumbent Republican Party Governor of Rhode Island, on an airing of June 8, 2006, a day after Carcieri's reelection announcement. During the interview, they discussed especially Carcieri's political career and then-future plans and softball. (Note: Rhode Island Governor Donald Carcieri's later remarks in Glover's radio show on October 17, 2007, about interpreters sparked negative responses.) She also discussed Abu Musab al-Zarqawi's death with a terrorism expert of the Naval War College and briefly interviewed T. Jason Smith, the author of a book Leaving Campus and Going to Work.

WHJJ (Note: The parent company of WHJJ was Clear Channel Communications.) receive an average weekly audience of 32,300 listeners aged twelve and older in fall 2005 when Glover started. The station's average audience declined to 26,900 in winter 2006. The 26,900 average was similar to when WHJJ syndicated the Air America radio network's liberal-oriented shows in spring 2005 but a decrease from 47,500 when the station had DePetro in summer 2004. By December 2006, Glover remained the station's only local radio host after it forced Arlene Violet to resign and fired another local host Howie Barte. Furthermore, Glover's talk show aired at 12 Noon–3 p.m., including Barte's former 1–3 p.m. time slot. (Note: Sean Hannity's radio talk show, broadcasting from New York City, replaced Arlene Violet. The War Room with Quinn and Rose, hosted by Jim Quinn and Rose Somma Tennent, aired at 9 a.m.–12 Noon, occupying Glover's former 10 a.m.–12 Noon slot.)

After the airing of August 27, 2013, Glover was dismissed by the WHJJ. (Note: Glover's replacement was a local veteran radio host Ron St. Pierre, who was dismissed by WPRO-AM in February that same year.)

== Political views ==
In 2006, Glover called for resignation of a US Representative Patrick J. Kennedy and generally favored the presidency of George W. Bush. She is a self-declared right-leaning Republican, while her husband Jim is a left-leaning Democrat.

== Selected bibliography ==
- Glover, Helen (February 15, 2003). "Glover assesses the gals 'tribe'". Providence Journal. p. D-1. NewsBank 1525093ED8711868.
