= Rob Cesternino =

American reality TV & podcasting personality

- Born: Robert Kristopher Cesternino; October 20, 1978 (age 48); Wantagh, New York, U.S.
- Education: State University of New York at Oswego (BA)
- Occupation: Podcaster
- Notable work: Rob Has a Podcast
- Television: Survivor: The Amazon; Survivor: All-Stars; The Traitors 4
- Spouse: Nicole Cesternino
- Website: Rob Has a Website

Robert Kristopher Cesternino (born October 20, 1978) is an American reality television contestant and podcast host, known for his appearances on Survivor: The Amazon (2003) and Survivor: All-Stars (2004).

In 2010, he launched Rob Has a Podcast, a platform to discuss and analyze reality television, most notably Survivor, Big Brother, and The Amazing Race. In 2014, Cesternino and The Hollywood Reporter journalist Josh Wigler launched Post Show Recaps, a companion platform that covers scripted television.

Cesternino appeared on the fourth season of The Traitors in 2026.

== Personal life ==
Cesternino is originally from Wantagh, New York. Cesternino attended the State University of New York at Oswego, graduating in 2000 with a Bachelor of Arts degree in broadcasting. He was a member of the Sigma Chi fraternity. His college thesis was titled, "The Impact of Reality Television."

At the time of his first appearance on Survivor, Cesternino was employed as a computer projects coordinator for an insurance agency. He had previously worked as a store clerk, a waiter, and a bartender. He originally applied to compete on Big Brother 3 and advanced to the final stages of the casting process but was ultimately not selected to appear on the show. Several months later, he was offered an opportunity by a casting producer who remembered him from the Big Brother casting process to compete on Survivor.

In August 2010, Cesternino married his longtime girlfriend, Nicole Palmeri. The couple's first child, Dominic James, was born on September 29, 2013. The couple's second child, Anthony Joseph, was born on November 12, 2015.

== Survivor ==
=== The Amazon ===
Cesternino appeared on Survivor: The Amazon in 2003. Originally assigned to the all-male Tambaqui tribe, Cesternino opted to keep a low profile early in the game, following orders from the older tribe members and using self-deprecating humor to disarm potential rivals. Once the tribes merged, he began forging multiple alliances and striking deals with other players. While most Survivor contestants in prior seasons tended to remain with their original alliance, Cesternino frequently flipped between groups, double-crossing allies and dictating the game strategy.

Cesternino was voted out on Day 38 (of 39) by Jenna Morasca, making him the fourteenth person eliminated and placing him third overall. Despite this, he cast his jury vote for Morasca to win the very next night. Morasca defeated Matthew von Ertfelda to be named the winner of the season. While he fell short of victory, Cesternino's performance is frequently cited as one of the best non-winning games in the history of the show.

=== All-Stars ===
In 2004, Cesternino was invited back to play again on Survivor: All-Stars as a member of the Chapera tribe. Due to his impressive gameplay in Survivor: The Amazon, he was considered a major strategic threat by the other returning players. He was the fourth person eliminated (and third voted out) after a unanimous decision by his tribemates, finishing in 15th place. Cesternino's fellow Survivor: The Amazon castaway Jenna Morasca had already withdrawn from the game to be with her ailing mother but was never voted out.

=== Legacy ===
Cesternino was inducted into Xfinity's Survivor "Hall of Fame" in 2012, alongside Amanda Kimmel and Ethan Zohn. In addition, both of his seasons were voted by viewers into the top 10 greatest seasons of all time - The Amazon was 8th, while All-Stars was 6th. In a 2015 interview shortly before the premiere of the 30th season, Jeff Probst stated that Cesternino and Spencer Bledsoe were his personal favorite non-winner contestants.

== Post-Survivor ==
=== Rob Has a Podcast ===
In 2010, Cesternino launched Rob Has a Podcast, also known as RHAP, a podcast network focused on the discussion of reality television, with an emphasis on CBS' competition reality shows – Survivor, Big Brother, and The Amazing Race. The podcast began by covering Survivor: Heroes vs. Villains. RHAP has expanded to cover a wide range of other reality programs and now features podcasts not hosted by Cesternino himself. He frequently has alumni of Survivor and other reality shows as guests on the podcast. As of 2022, RHAP typically features ten weekly podcasts covering Survivor during the season, with five hosted by Cesternino and five hosted by other RHAP hosts.

Rob Has a Podcast has won five Podcast Awards: best entertainment podcast (2012, 2014), best video podcast (2013), best produced podcast (2013). Most notably, RHAP beat hit podcast Serial in the category of people's choice podcast of 2014.

=== The Traitors 4 ===
In June 2025, Cesternino was announced as a competitor on the fourth season of The Traitors, competing alongside fellow Survivor contestants Natalie Anderson and Yamil "Yam Yam" Arocho Cesternino was the second person to be "murdered" by the traitors and the third person eliminated from the competition.

=== Other media ===
In June 2013, Cesternino appeared as a co-host and executive producer of Reality Gamemasters, a YouTube game show featuring six reality stars competing in a game of Risk.

From 2013 to 2014, Cesternino hosted the Timeout with T.O. podcast with Terrell Owens and Alonzo Bodden on the Sideshow Network.

Cesternino was approached to compete on The Amazing Race 31 with Survivor: Tocantins contestant and RHAP co-host, Stephen Fishbach. The pair showed interest but declined due to Fishbach's upcoming wedding.

Cesternino's debut book, The Tribe and I Have Spoken was published on May 5, 2026 by Simon & Schuster. The book covers the history of Survivor, with special attention paid to Cesternino's favorite moments from the show's first 48 seasons.

== Filmography ==
Year	Title	Role	Notes
2003	Survivor: The Amazon	Contestant	Eliminated; 3rd place
2004	Survivor: All-Stars	Contestant	Eliminated; 15th place
2005	The Scorned	Self	TV-movie; also producer
2005	Kill Reality	Self	Behind-the-scenes horror movie of The Scorned
2006	Soup of the Day	Self	Also producer and writer
2008	Girls of Summer	Big Wave Dave	
2026	The Traitors	Contestant	Eliminated; 21st place
2026	Big Brother: Unlocked	Self	1 episode; The BBies co-host

=== Podcasts ===
Year	Podcast	Host(s)	Episode / Notes	Ref.
2010–present	Rob Has a Podcast (RHAP)	Rob Cesternino	Creator and primary host; covers Survivor, Big Brother, and other reality TV shows.	
2014–present	Post Show Recaps	Rob Cesternino and Josh Wigler	Co-creator and co-host; focuses on scripted television.	
2015–present	News AF	Rob Cesternino, Tyson Apostol, and Danny Bryson	Co-host; a weekly podcast covering internet news.	
2022	Drop Your Buffs	Evan Ross Katz and Sean Ross	Guest; Episode: "Rob Cesternino (Survivor: The Amazon)"	
2022	The Ringer Reality TV Podcast (The Pod Has Spoken)	Tyson Apostol	Guest; frequent guest discussing Survivor strategy.	
