= Christy Smith (Survivor contestant) =

American activist and television personality

- Born: September 13, 1978 (age 47); Aspen, Colorado, U.S.
- Television: Survivor: The Amazon

Christy Smith (born September 13, 1978) is an American activist and television personality. She is the first deaf contestant on the CBS reality television series Survivor: The Amazon and co-founder of Discovering Deaf Worlds.

== Early life ==
Christy Smith was born premature, weighing less than 2 pounds (0.91 kg). As a baby, she pulled out her air tube and ended up losing 90 percent of her hearing. As such, she is skilled in lip reading and American Sign Language. She resided in Basalt, Colorado.

== Education and career ==
Smith attended high school and college in Washington, D.C. She obtained a Bachelor of Arts degree in sociology with a minor in criminology from Gallaudet University in 2000. After graduating from Gallaudet, she worked at Aspen Camp School for the Deaf as a guide. After competing on Survivor, Smith created Christy's Kids: Challenge Yourself, a television show that debuted on Rocky Mountain PBS in April 2005.

In January 2007, Smith co-founded Discovering Deaf Worlds, an organization which uses world travel to increase deafness awareness.

== Survivor ==
Smith is the first deaf contestant to appear on the CBS reality television series Survivor. As a contestant on Survivor: The Amazon, Smith shocked her tribe members on the first day when she announced her disability. She competed on Survivor to bring awareness of deaf culture and in the hope of bringing home the prize money.

On Day 33 of the show, Smith was voted out in a 4–2 decision. Smith came in sixth place and became the fourth member of the jury of seven that would ultimately vote for the winner of the show. In the end, Smith voted for Jenna Morasca to win the 1,000,000 USD grand prize.
