= Rob Has a Podcast =

Podcast about reality game shows

- Genre: Entertainment; Interview; Reality television
- Language: English

Cast and voices
- Hosted by: Rob Cesternino

Technical specifications
- Audio format: Podcast (via streaming or downloadable MP3)

Publication
- Original release: February 12, 2010
- Provider: Spotify; YouTube; Apple Podcasts
- Updates: Multiple shows each week

Reception
- Cited for: Five-time Podcast Award winner

Related
- Website: Rob Has a Website

Rob Has a Podcast (RHAP) is a network of entertainment podcasts founded in 2010 by former Survivor contestant Rob Cesternino. It began as a single podcast recapping Survivor and has since grown into a network of dozens of podcasts, primarily providing commentary on reality television game shows and scripted TV.

== Overview ==
Cesternino started RHAP in 2010, in order to cover Survivor: Heroes vs.Villains and the final season of Lost. He continually expanded the podcast over the next several years, adding coverage of other series, as well as more hosts, many drawn from the community. As of 2026, the business had five employees as well as freelancer contributions.

RHAP is funded partly by Patreon subscriptions, which gives users bonus content and access to community groups. As of 2026, RHAP had 3,000 Patreon members, 50,000 podcast subscribers, and 200,000 YouTube subscribers.

In addition to its Survivor coverage, RHAP produces podcasts for many other reality shows such as The Traitors, RuPaul's Drag Race, The Bachelor and Big Brother, as well as scripted shows like Severance.

=== Survivor ===
During Survivor seasons, Cesternino records multiple podcasts about the show each week, including a live show with Stephen Fishbach called Survivor Know-It-Alls. Know-It-Alls airs live after Survivor episodes. RHAP also produces shows discussing Survivor that feature hosts other than Cesternino. The Evolution of Strategy is an audiobook released by Cesternino and Josh Wigler analyzing the first 30 seasons of Survivor.

=== Big Brother ===
During Big Brother seasons, RHAP releases several podcasts each week, including interviews, summaries, and weekly "stock watch" episodes that rank the players in the house. Taran Armstrong hosts a daily update every morning, where the events and strategies of the previous day's 24-hour live feed of the houseguests are synthesized into one podcast.

== Special events ==
=== Reality Gamemasters ===
On February 20, 2013, Cesternino launched a Kickstarter campaign to fund a new project, Reality Gamemasters, in which six reality TV contestants would compete in a game of Risk, to be filmed and aired on YouTube. On March 22, 2013, the project was successfully funded, receiving $7,036 from 170 individual backers. The miniseries, directed by Cesternino and Alex Forstenhausler, consisted of six episodes and began airing on June 3, 2013. The contestants included John Cochran, Sophie Clarke, and Stephen Fishbach of Survivor, and Ian Terry, Eric Stein, and Matt Hoffman of Big Brother. Andrea Boehlke hosted the competition, with additional Survivor contestants Billy Garcia and R.C. Saint-Amour making guest appearances on the show. Cesternino provided game commentary throughout each episode alongside Entertainment Weekly's Dalton Ross.

== Related podcasts ==
=== News AF ===
In 2015, Cesternino launched The Spyson Hour with Tyson Apostol from Survivor and Spencer Pratt from The Hills. Apostol had been a frequent guest on Cesternino's Survivor podcast. The show began as a way for Apostol and Pratt to discuss season four of Marriage Boot Camp, where they had originally met as fellow participants. After the season finished airing, Apostol, Pratt, and Cesternino continued the podcast, focusing on events in their lives and on zany current events stories. Pratt abruptly left the show in the fall of 2015.

Following Pratt's departure, Apostol and Cesternino created a new podcast, News AF, with Danny Bryson as the third co-host. News AF discusses the real yet unconventional news found on the Internet and is frequently recorded and aired live on YouTube. The show is still active as of January 2026, with over 700 episodes recorded.

== Reception ==
RHAP has won five Podcast Awards: best entertainment podcast (2012, 2014); best video podcast (2013); and best produced podcast (2013). Most notably, RHAP beat hit podcast Serial in the People's Choice category in 2014.

RHAP recorded its 1000th episode on November 14, 2014, and celebrated its fifth anniversary in February 2015. Its 5000th episode was released in February 2024, and featured Jeff Probst, the host of Survivor.

In 2015, the podcast was nominated for an Academy of Podcasters award in the entertainment category.

In 2020, Briana Kranich of Screen Rant named Rob Has a Podcast as one of the 10 Best Reality TV Podcasts You're Missing Out On.
