= Teerayoot Suebsil =

Thai footballer (born 1978)

Personal information
- Full name: Teerayoot Suebsil
- Date of birth: 28 November 1978 (age 47)
- Place of birth: Phang Nga, Phang Nga Province, Thailand
- Height: 1.80 m (5 ft 11 in)
- Position: Midfielder

Team information
- Current team: Bangkok United
- Number: 14

Senior career*
Years	Team	Apps	(Gls)
2002–present	Bangkok United	136	(19)
- * Club domestic league appearances and goals as of 14 November 2008

Teerayoot Suebsil is a Thai professional footballer who currently plays for Bangkok United in the Thailand Premier League.

He also played for Bangkok University FC in the 2007 AFC Champions League group stage.

== See also ==
- Football in Thailand
- List of football clubs in Thailand
