= Seals of the provinces of Thailand =

This is a list of the seals of the provinces of Thailand (Thai: ตราประจำจังหวัดของไทย).

== Current provinces ==
This list includes all the seals of the provinces of Thailand. It also includes the special administrative area of the capital, Bangkok.

Location	Seal	Province	Observations
		Amnat Charoen อำนาจเจริญ	This seal shows the 20 metres (66 ft) high Buddha-Statue Phra Mongkhon Ming Mueang that stands in the provincial capital Amnat Charoen.
		Ang Thong อ่างทอง	Ang Thong province is one of the main rice-producing areas of Thailand. On the centre of the seal there is a bowl with water and rice ears, a symbol of Mae Po Sop, the rice goddess.
		Ayutthaya พระนครศรีอยุธยา	A pavilion sheltering a white conch (Shankha) on a phan (tray) in honor of King Uthong, the legendary founder of the city. Behind stands the Fragrant Manjack (Cordia dichotoma), the provincial tree
		Bangkok กรุงเทพมหานคร	Hindu god Indra with a vajra in his hand on the mythological four-headed elephant Erawan (Airavata). The seal was based on a painting by Prince Narisara Nuvadtivong.
		Bueng Kan บึงกาฬ	The silhouette of Phu Thok 18°08′15″N 103°52′45″E, a rocky sandstone outcrop on whose summit stands Wat Phu Thok temple.
		Buri Ram บุรีรัมย์	A dancing deity in front of Phanom Rung Prasat Hin Phanom Rung, a Khmer temple complex set on the rim of an extinct volcano at 1,320 feet (400 m) above sea level
		Chachoengsao ฉะเชิงเทรา	Wat Sothonwararam, the temple that houses the Luangpho Phuttha Sothon, a revered statue of the Buddha.
		Chainat ชัยนาท	Dharmachakra held aloft by Garuda in front of the locally revered mountain Khao Phlong 15°12′N 100°09′E and the Chao Phraya River.
		Chaiyaphum ชัยภูมิ	Dvaja, the flag, an ancient Hindu symbol of victory in battle
		Chanthaburi จันทบุรี	The Moon surrounded by an aura. Inside the moon disc is a dark rabbit, for according to Thai tradition the dark areas on the moon (maria) form a rabbit shape.
		Chiang Mai เชียงใหม่	A white elephant in a glass pavilion to commemorate the offering of such an elephant by Thammalangka, a ruler of Chiang Mai, to his overlord, King Rama II of Bangkok. The pavilion symbolizes that Buddhism prospered in Chiang Mai, especially when in 1477 the teachings of Buddha, the Tripitaka, were reviewed.
		Chiang Rai เชียงราย	A white elephant, the royal symbol, as a reminder of the fact that Chiang Rai was founded by King Mangrai because his elephant liked the place, according to the legend.
		Chonburi ชลบุรี	Over the sea the outline of Khao Sam Muk, on which a shrine is located. Local people believe that the spirit of that mountain protects the fishermen from harm. The silhouette of Ko Sichang Island is displayed in the background.
		Chumphon ชุมพร	An apsara giving blessings to the people standing between two Cluster Fig trees (Ficus glomerata), the provincial tree
		Kalasin กาฬสินธุ์	The seal of the province shows a pond, in the background the Phu Phan Mountains forming the boundary of the province and stylized clouds in the sky. The water in the pond is black, for the name Kalasin means "black water". The big clouds as well as the water symbolize the fertility of the province.
		Kamphaeng Phet กำแพงเพชร	The city walls surmounted by diamonds, since the city name means diamond wall
		Kanchanaburi กาญจนบุรี	Representation of the three stupas, located on Bantadthong Mountain. They gave the name to the mountain pass to Myanmar, called "Three Pagodas Pass".
		Khon Kaen ขอนแก่น	The stupa of Phra That Kham Kaen, which is believed to contain relics of Buddha. Two trees are depicted on both sides, one is a banyan tree (Ficus benghalensis), the other a Golden Shower Tree (Cassia fistula).
		Krabi กระบี่	Two crossed krabi, ancient Siamese swords, in front of the Indian Ocean and the Phanom Bencha mountain, the highest mountain of the province.
		Lampang ลำปาง	A white rooster at the gates of Wat Phra That Lampang Luang, illustrating a local legend about the Buddha's visit to the province.
		Lamphun ลำพูน	Wat Phra That Haripunchai temple, which was already the main temple of the city Lamphun during the Mon epoch.
		Loei เลย	The stupa at Phra That Si Song Rak built by King Maha Chakkraphat of the Ayutthaya Kingdom, and King Setthathirath of Lan Xang in the 16th century marking the friendship between the two kingdoms.
		Lopburi ลพบุรี	God Vishnu (aka Narayana, refers to King Narai of Ayutthaya Kingdom) in front of Khmer Temple Phra Prang Sam Yod.
		Mae Hong Son แม่ฮ่องสอน	The provincial seal, Rup chang nai thong nam (รูปช้างในท้องน้ำ), shows an elephant in the water as a reference to the founding of the town by Lord Kaeo of Ma when he was sent to capture elephants for the Lord of Chiang Mai (1825–1846).
		Maha Sarakham มหาสารคาม	A big tree in front of big rice fields, symbolizing the richness of resources in the province.
		Mukdahan มุกดาหาร	Prasart Song Nang Sathit palace, in which an opal is displayed on a phan (tray).
		Nakhon Nayok นครนายก	An elephant holding ears of rice with its trunk. This symbolizes the fertile rice fields of Nakhon Nayok, as well as the forests with numerous elephants. In the background two piles of straw, trees and stylized clouds symbolize the natural beauty of the province.
		Nakhon Pathom นครปฐม	The Phra Pathom Chedi stupa, among the highest pagodas of the world. Located at the city center, it has been an important Buddhist center since the 6th century. The current building was created by king Mongkut in 1860. On the pagoda a royal crown is depicted, the symbol for King Mongkut's reconstruction.
		Nakhon Phanom นครพนม	The 57 m high chedi at Wat Phra That Phanom in Amphoe That Phanom.
		Nakhon Ratchasima นครราชสีมา	The revered heroine of Korat, Thao Suranari (1771–1852), fight against Vientianian, standing in front of the old gate of Pratu Chumpon.
		Nakhon Sawan นครสวรรค์	Wiman, a mythological palace located in heaven. This relates to the name of the province which translates to Heavenly City
		Nakhon Si Thammarat นครศรีธรรมราช	Phra Baromathat Chedi of the Wat Phra Mahathat Voramahavihan, one of the most important historical sites in southern Thailand. According to the city chronicle it was already built in 311, but archaeology dates it to the 13th century. The chedi is surrounded by the animals of the Chinese zodiac in the seal. The twelve animals represent the twelve Naksat cities or city-states which were tributary to the Nakhon Si Thammarat kingdom: the Rat of Saiburi; the Ox of Pattani; the Tiger of Kelantan; the Rabbit of Pahang (actually a city in Pahang which is said to be submerged by a lake now); a large Dragon of Kedah; a small Snake of Phatthalung; a Horse of Trang; a Goat of Chumphon; a Monkey of Bantaysamer (might be Chaiya, or a town in Krabi province); a Rooster of Sa-ulau (unidentified city, might be Songkhla, Kanchanadit or Pla Tha); a Dog of Takua Pa and a Pig of Kraburi.
		Nan น่าน	A deity bull named Usubharaja (aka. Nandi, the Shiva's Vahana) carrying the stupa of Phrathat Chae Haeng.
		Narathiwat นราธิวาส	A sailing boat with a white elephant on the sail. The white elephant. a royal symbol, commemorates the white elephant Phra Sri Nararat Rajakarini which was caught here and presented to the king.
		Nong Bua Lam Phu หนองบัวลำภู	King Naresuan in front of a shrine. This shrine was built to commemorate the visit of King Naresuan to the city of Nong Bua Lamphu in 1574 when he was gathering troops to fight the Burmese kingdom of Taungoo. Behind the shrine is a pond with lotus flowers (Nymphaea lotus), which is the provincial flower.
		Nong Khai หนองคาย	A pond with a bamboo clump close to it. The bamboo symbolizes stability, glory and continuity for the peaceful and fertile land.
		Nonthaburi นนทบุรี	A pot (Kalasha), made of fine earthenware is a traditional product from Nonthaburi. The pot also symbolizes the fertility of the province.
		Pathum Thani ปทุมธานี	A pink lotus flower with two rice ears bending over it. Both symbols stand for the fertility of the province.
		Pattani ปัตตานี	The cannon known as Phraya Tani, which was cast in the Pattani province.
		Phang Nga พังงา	Phu Khao Chang mountains in the background and Ko Tapu in front, as well as a dredge to represent the tin mining in the province.
		Phatthalung พัทลุง	Phu Khao Ok Thalu mountain, the symbol of the province.
		Phayao พะเยา	The Buddha's statue called Phra Chao Ton Luang from the temple Wat Si Khom Kham. Behind are 7 flames showing the glory of Buddha. In front of Buddha is a bowl and two ears of rice.
		Phetchabun เพชรบูรณ์	A diamond before a mountain, as diamonds are found in this mountainous province. In the front are tobacco plants as one of the crops grown in the province.
		Phetchaburi เพชรบุรี	Khao Wang palace in the background. In front are rice fields bordered by two coconut palm trees, symbolizing the major crops in the province.
		Phichit พิจิตร	A pond, which refers to the old name of Phichit, Mueang Sra Luang (‘city at the royal pond’). The banyan tree in front refers to the temple Wat Pho Prathab Chang. The temple was built in 1669–71 by King Suriyenthrathibodi, aka, Luang Sorasak or Phrachao Suea, who was born in the village of Pho Prathab Chang, between a banyan and a sacred fig.
		Phitsanulok พิษณุโลก	Buddha Chinnarat, considered one of the most beautiful Buddha figures in Thailand. It is located in Wat Mahathat temple in the city Phitsanulok.
		Phrae แพร่	According to legend the two cities of Phrae and Nan were once ruled by brothers. When they met to divide the land between them the one from Phrae rode on a horse, the one from Nan on a buffalo to the meeting point on top of a mountain. Hence Phrae uses a horse in their seal, while Nan uses a buffalo. When the provincial government proposed the seal in 1940, the Fine Arts Department suggested adding a historic building to the seal in addition to the horse, thus it now has the stupa of Phra Tat Cho Hae on the back of the horse.
		Phuket ภูเก็ต	The sisters Thao Thep Kasattri and Thao Sri Sunthon, fighters against the Burmese.
		Prachinburi ปราจีนบุรี	A Bodhi tree symbolizing the first Bodhi tree planted about 2000 years ago in Wat Si Maha Phot temple.
		Prachuap Khiri Khan ประจวบคีรีขันธ์	Kuha Karuhas pavilion, which was built when King Chulalongkorn (Rama V) visited the Praya Nakorn Cave (Amphoe Sam Roi Yot). Depicted behind the pavilion is the island of Ko Lak in Prachuap Bay, the historic center of administration of the province.
		Ranong ระนอง	A palace on top of a hill, to remember that King Chulalongkorn (Rama V) once visited Ranong and stayed at the Ratana Rangsan Palace on top of the Niveskiri Hill.
		Ratchaburi ราชบุรี	The royal sword above the royal sandals on a phan (tray), for the name Ratchaburi means City of the King.
		Rayong ระยอง	Island Ko Samet and a coconut palm.
		Roi Et ร้อยเอ็ด	The shrine of the city pillar (Lak Mueang), which is located in the artificial lake Bueng Phlan Chai. The spirit of the shrine, Mahesak, is highly revered by the local people.
		Sa Kaeo สระแก้ว	The sun rising over the archeological ruins Prasart Kao Noi Si Chom Poo, an important Khmer temple. The rising sun symbolizes the location of the province in the east. In the front is Buddha's statue in a pond with lotus flowers.
		Sakon Nakhon สกลนคร	Phrathat Choeng Chum, a Lao-style stupa built during the Ayutthaya period over a Khmer-style prang.
		Samut Prakan สมุทรปราการ	Phra Samut Chedi, the most important site of Buddhist worship in the province.
		Samut Sakhon สมุทรสาคร	A Chinese junk in front of the coast, with a smoking chimney, referring to the Tha Chin River (ท่าจีน; "Chinese Port"), as well as the old of the province, Mueang Tha Chin (เมืองท่าจีน; "City of Chinese Port"). It also refers to the old trading tradition as well as the local industries.
		Samut Songkhram สมุทรสงคราม	Garuda above a drum over a river. The Thai word for drum is klong, thus refers to the Klong River (แม่กลอง mae klong), as well as the old name of the province, Mueang Mae Klong (เมืองแม่กลอง; "City of Klong River"). On both sides of the river coconut trees are displayed as one of the main product of the province.
		Saraburi สระบุรี	Wat Phra Phuttha Bat temple. In the 17th century a hunter found a puddle of water which looked like a (oversized) footprint. It was declared a footprint of Buddha, and the temple was built around it. Phra Phutthabat means footprint of Buddha.
		Satun สตูล	Phra Samut Thewa, a deity who guards the sea, sitting on a stone in the sea with the sunset behind. The stone is his divine vehicle. The sunset symbolizes the Andaman Sea, which lies to the west of the province.
		Sing Buri สิงห์บุรี	The former provincial seal showed the fort of Khai Bangrachan, a historical monument. When the Burmese attacked Ayutthaya in 1765, eleven villagers from Bangrachan fought the army when it stopped north of Ayutthaya. They managed to delay them for five months before they were finally defeated, soon thereafter Ayutthaya fell as well.
		Sisaket ศรีสะเกษ	Prasat Hin Ban Samo, a Khmer temple about 1000 years old, located in the Prang Ku district.
		Songkhla สงขลา	A white conch (shankha) on a phan (tray)
		Sukhothai สุโขท้ย	King Ram Khamhaeng the Great sitting on the Manangkhasila Asana throne. Under King Ram Khamhaeng the kingdom of Sukhothai flourished the most.
		Suphan Buri สุพรรณบุรี	The elephant duel between King Naresuan and the crown prince of Burma named Mingyi Swa in 1592, which took place in Suphan Buri.
		Surat Thani สุราษฎร์ธานี	Phra Boromathat Chaiya Chedi, reportedly built in the 9th century.
		Surin สุรินทร์	Indra atop his celestial white elephant, Airavata which is based on the design found on a famous Khmer temple in the province. Both Khmer temples as well as elephants are commonly found in Surin.
		Tak ตาก	King Naresuan on the royal elephant. Sometimes below the elephant a garuda is depicted, as the garuda is the state symbol of Thailand. King Naresuan is shown pouring consecrated water on the ground, a symbolic act to declare independence. This refers to the war of 1584 with Burma, when Tak was the first border town to be liberated from Burmese control.
		Trang ตรัง	A lighthouse jetty and sea tides. The jetty represents the fact that the area has long been a port town. The tides indicate the meaning of the province's name, which is from Sanskrit "तरङ्ग" (taraṅga; "tide", "wave").
		Trat ตราด	The sea and Khao Banthat mountain range in the background
		Ubon Ratchathani อุบลราชธานี	A lotus flower in a pond in reference to the meaning of the name of the province, ‘Royal City of the Lotus Flower’.
		Udon Thani อุดรธานี	A Yak (Yaksha) in honor of Kuvera (aka. Vaiśravaṇa), the guardian of north direction in Buddhist mythology.
		Uthai Thani อุทัยธานี	The pavilion at Wat Khao Sakaekrang. It houses the statue of Thongdee, the father of King Rama I. The mountain in the background symbolizes the location of the pavilion on top of Khao Sakae Krang hill.
		Uttaradit อุตรดิตถ์	The mondop at Wat Phra Thaen Sila At temple, in Baan Phra Thaen in the Laplae district. The main item of worship in the temple is a laterite block, which is believed to have been used by Buddha to seek enlightenment. The mondhop is built upon this block.
		Yala ยะลา	A miner with simple mining tools including hoe, crowbar, and baskets. Yala was originally a mining town with tin and tungsten ores.
		Yasothon ยโสธร	Two mythical lions, called singh, facing the chedi Phra That A-non (named for Ananda, a devout attendant of Gautama Buddha), in the temple Wat Maha That in the city of Yasothon

== Former provinces ==
Lan Chang ลานช้าง	Corresponds to present-day Sainyabuli province in Laos.
Phibunsongkhram พิบูลสงคราม	Corresponding to present-day Cambodian Siem Reap, Oddar Meanchey and Banteay Meanchey provinces.
Phra Tabong พระตะบอง	The area is now covered by the provinces of Battambang and Pailin of Cambodia.
Phra Nakhon พระนคร	Phra Nakhon province merged with the Bangkok administrative area in 1972.
Thonburi ธนบุรี	Thonburi province merged with the Bangkok administrative area in 1972.

== See also ==
- List of Thai provincial trees
