= Phang Nga =

Phang Nga พังงา
- Town
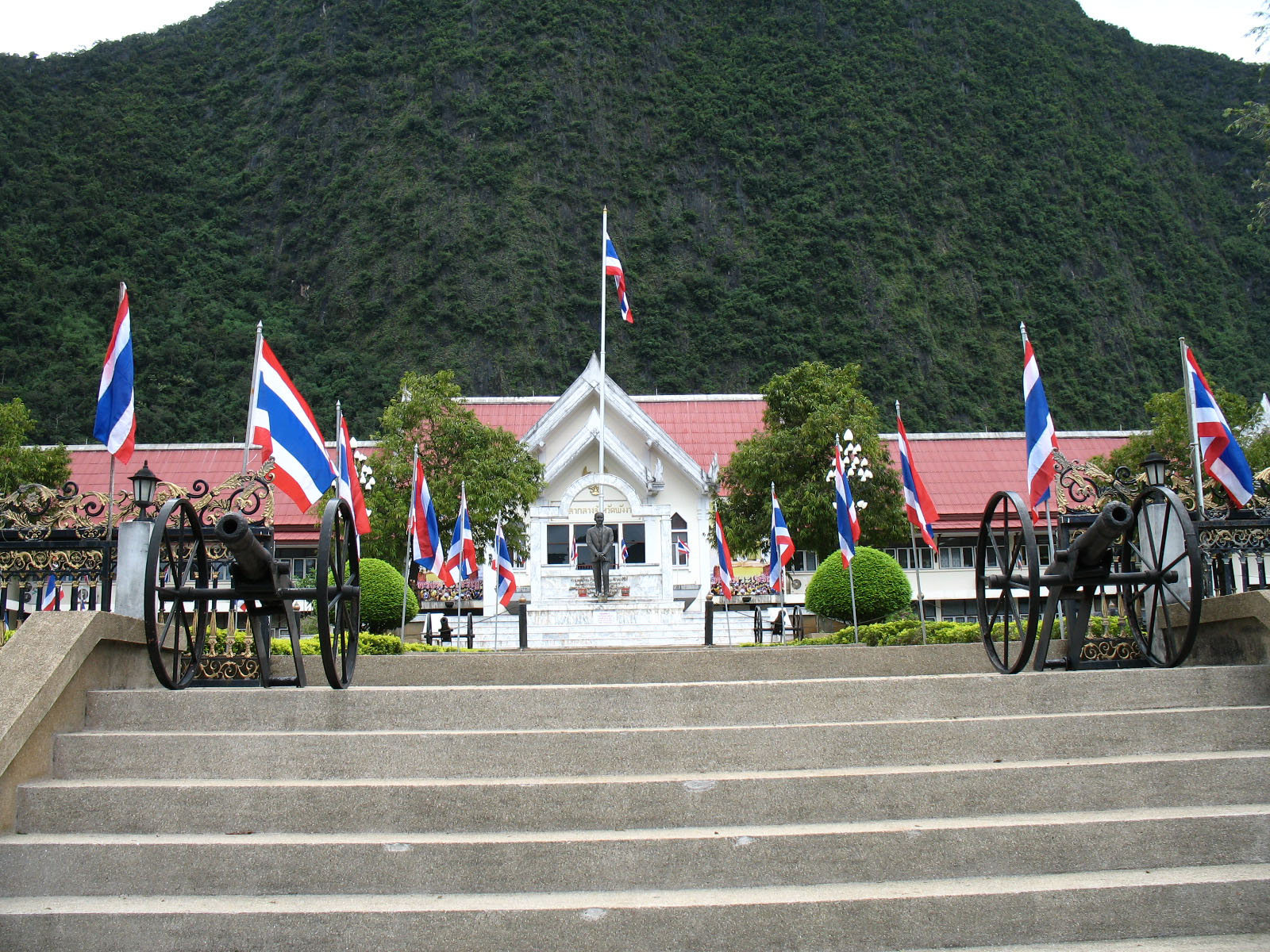
- Khao Chang mount rising behind Phang Nga City Hall

- Location in Thailand
- Coordinates: 8°27′52″N 98°31′54″E
- Country: Thailand
- Province: Phang Nga Province
- District: Amphoe Mueang Phang Nga

Population (2005)
  - Total: 9,559
- Time zone: UTC+7 (ICT)

Phang Nga (Thai: พังงา, RTGS: Phangnga, pronounced [pʰāŋ.ŋāː]) is a town in southern Thailand, and the capital of Phang Nga Province. It is officially classified as a thesaban mueang (town municipality).

The town covers the whole tambon Thai Chang of Mueang Phang Nga district. As of 2005, it had a population of 9,559 and covered an area of 6.75 km². Phang Nga is 764 km from Bangkok by road.

The municipal administration was created on 11 February 1937. The town is subdivided into nine wards (chumchon).

1. Talat Yai (ตลาดใหญ่)
2. Borirak Bamrung (บริรักษ์บำรุง)
3. Samakkhi (สามัคคี)
4. Thung Chedi (ทุ่งเจดีย์)
5. Ruamchai Phatthana (ร่วมใจพัฒนา)
6. Na Krok Khok Ya (นากรอกคอกหญ้า)
7. Thanon Mai (ถนนใหม่)
8. Khao Chang (เขาช้าง)
9. Wang Mokaeng (วังหม้อแกง)

== Notable people ==
- Teerayoot Suebsil (born 1978), professional footballer
