= Khao Chang =

Mountain in Thailand

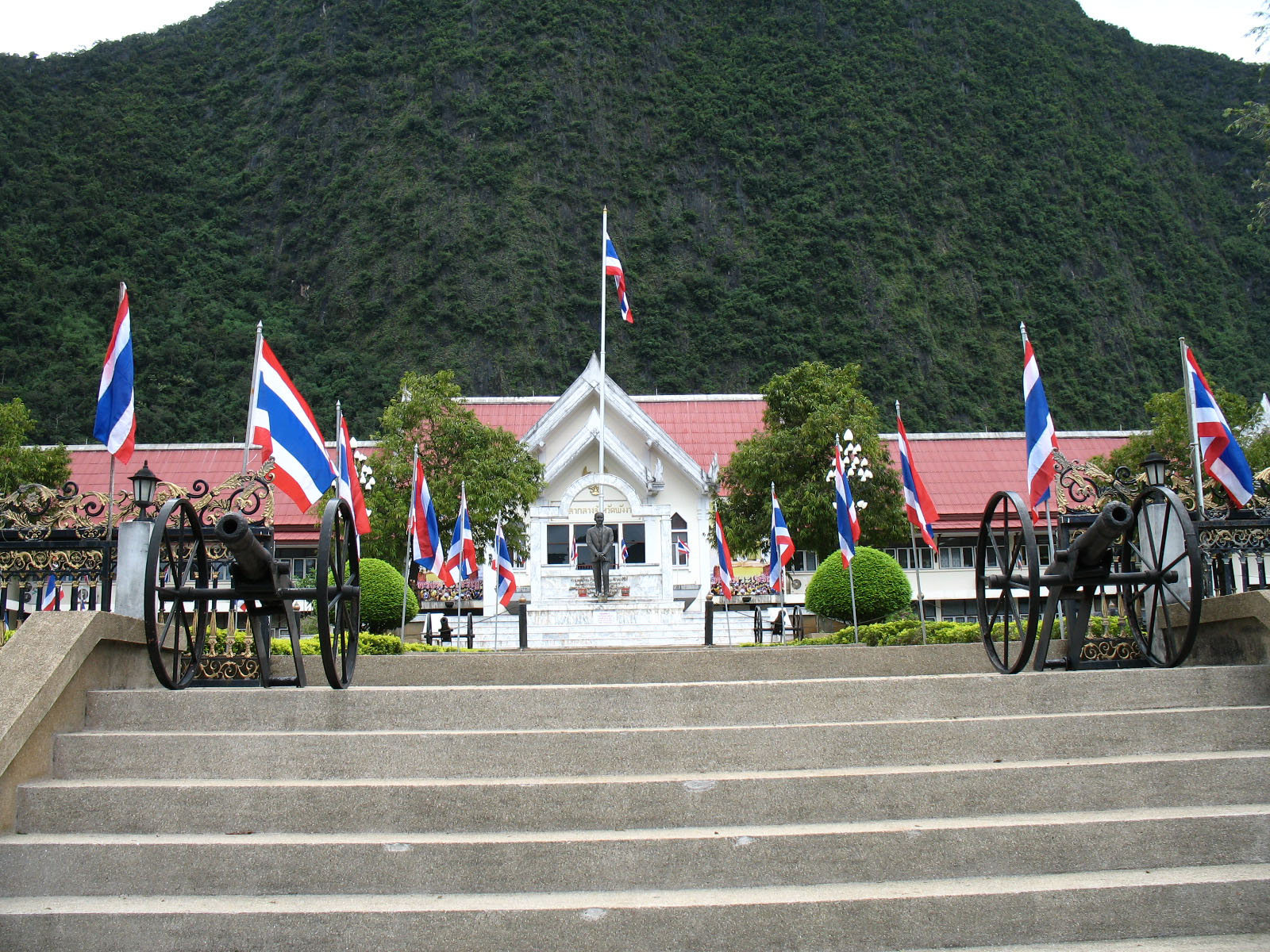
- Khao Chang rising behind Phang Nga City Hall

Highest point
- Elevation: 240 m (790 ft)
- Listing: List of mountains in Thailand
- Coordinates: 8°27′6″N 98°31′2″E

Geography
- Location within Thailand
- Location: Phang Nga, Thailand

Geology
- Mountain type: karstic

Climbing
- Easiest route: drive

Khao Chang (เขาช้าง), is a 45 m high hill in Phang Nga Province, Thailand. It is in Phang Nga town behind city hall.

Located within the compound of Wat Phra Paht Phra Chim temple, at the base of a mountain, is Phung Chang Cave, also known as 'Elephant Belly Cave.' This cave is notable for its stalactites and stalagmites formations. Certain areas of the cave are permanently flooded, but they remain accessible to visitors via boat.

== Symbolism ==
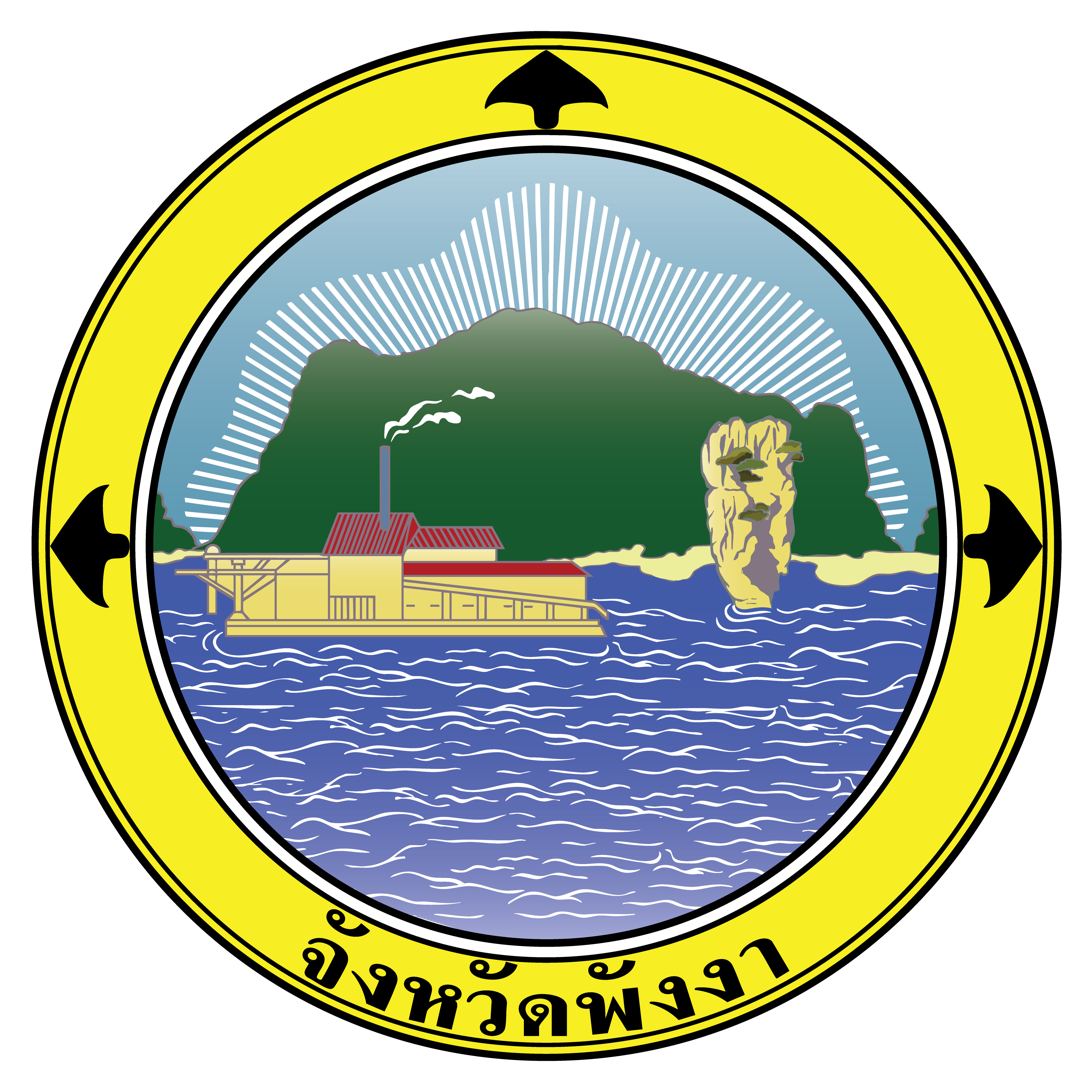
Provincial seal of Phang Nga

In the cultural context of Phang Nga, Khao Chang holds significant symbolic value. Its towering shape resembles a crouched elephant, a feature that has led to its inclusion in the provincial seal of Phang Nga.

== See also ==
- List of mountains in Thailand
- Phang Nga Province
- Seals of the provinces of Thailand
