= Khao Ok Thalu =

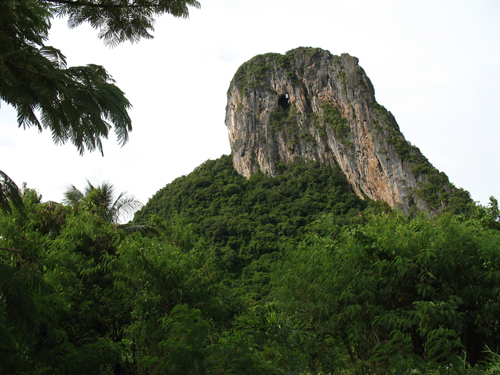

Highest point
- Elevation: 177 m (581 ft)
- Listing: List of mountains in Thailand
- Coordinates: 7°37′30″N 100°05′30″E

Geography
- Location within Thailand
- Location: Phatthalung, Thailand
- Parent range: Tenasserim Hills

Geology
- Mountain type: karstic

Climbing
- Easiest route: drive

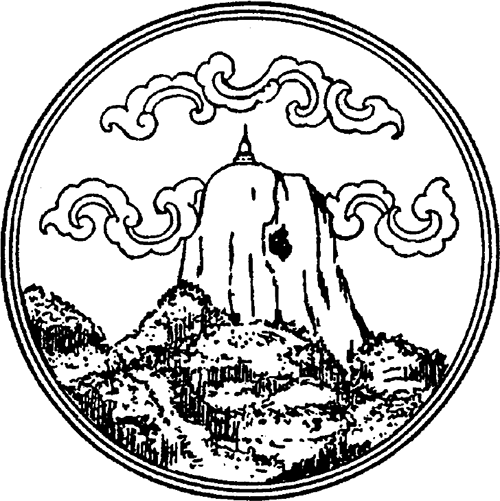
Provincial seal of PhatThalung

Khao Ok Thalu (Thai: เขาอกทะลุ) or Phukhao Ok Thalu (ภูเขาอกทะลุ), is a mountain in Phatthalung Province, Thailand. It is a karstic formation.

== Tourism ==
This mountain is east of the Phatthalung railway station. It can be accessed from Wat Khuha Sawan via Highway 4047. There is a flight of stairs leading to the mountaintop where there is a Buddhist shrine overlooking the city of Phatthalung. The mountain is named after a hole near the top.

Khao Ok Thalu is an unusually-shaped mountain, clearly visible from afar. It has symbolic significance in Phatthalung and appears in somewhat stylized form on the provincial seal of PhatThalung.

== See also ==
- List of mountains in Thailand
- Phatthalung Province
- Seals of the provinces of Thailand
- Legend of Khao Ok Thalu
