= Legend of Khao Ok Thalu =

Legend of Khao Ok Thalu (Thai: ตำนานเขาอกทะลุ) is a tale of a mountain which is located in Phatthalung Province in Southern Thailand. The mountain is the seal of the province. Its shape is outstanding. There is a large hole in the middle of the mountain which can be seen through the opposite side.

== The Legend ==
There are several version of the tale, Khao Ok Thalu, which of each is unknown to be an original story. One of them begins like this. Long time ago, Khao Ok Thalu was very handsome that everyone could not imagine. Most ladies could not take their eyes off him. One day, he married a beautiful woman. They were so in love and lived together happily. But then he had an affair with another charming lady. Later, he appointed the first lady to be the principal wife and the second lady to be a concubine. However, the first wife was not happy to let her husband have a new lady. Therefore, the wife came to meet the concubine and they had a fight. She threw everything around her but the one she hurt was her husband. He seemed to come to stop the fight but he was struck by a pestle on his breast. He died and became a mountain named Khao Ok Thalu. The concubine was also hit on the head and became Khao Hua Taek (ปราโมทย์, 1997).

The next version is similar to the previous story. The fight actually happened when the man named Mueang, Yisoon (Sila's daughter) and Chang Kang (Buppha's son) were going out. Sila, the first wife, and Buppha, the concubine, had a fight. Sila used a spindle to beat Buppha. Buppha used a pestle to beat her. Then these two women died and became a mountain. Sila became Khao Ok Thalu and Buppha became Khao Hua Taek (Thaiculturebuu, 2010).

== Characters ==
Character	Relation
Mueang	A very charming man
Sila	Mueang's wife
Buppha	Mueang's concubine
Yisoon	Sila's daughter
Chang Kang	Buppha's son
Khao Ok Thalu	A mountain that has a big hole in the middle which can be seen through the opposite side, located in Phatthalung
Khao Hua Taek	A mountain that has a big hole at the top, located in Trang

== Khao Ok Thalu ==
Khao Ok Thalu is located in Phatthalung Province, Thailand. Another name of Khao Ok Thalu is Khao Chai Buri but Khao Ok Thalu is better-known. It covers three districts as Khuha Sawan, Ban Prang Mu, Phaya Khan. The shape of the mountain is unusual. There is a big hole and it can be seen obviously from the top view. Everyone can see it because it is in the center of the province and straight to the train station where it could catch most of visitors’ eyes after a long journey.

== Importance ==
Most people in Phatthalung Province believe that Khao Ok Thalu is holy where the goddess lives. Also there is a belief which can compare as a pillar of Phatthalung. Therefore, it has become the seal of Phatthalung according to the history of the province.
