= Phang Nga province =

Coordinates: 8°26′23″N 98°31′5″E

Phang Nga พังงา
- Province

Other transcription(s)
  - Southern Thai: พังงา (pronounced [pʰâŋ.ŋâːʔ])
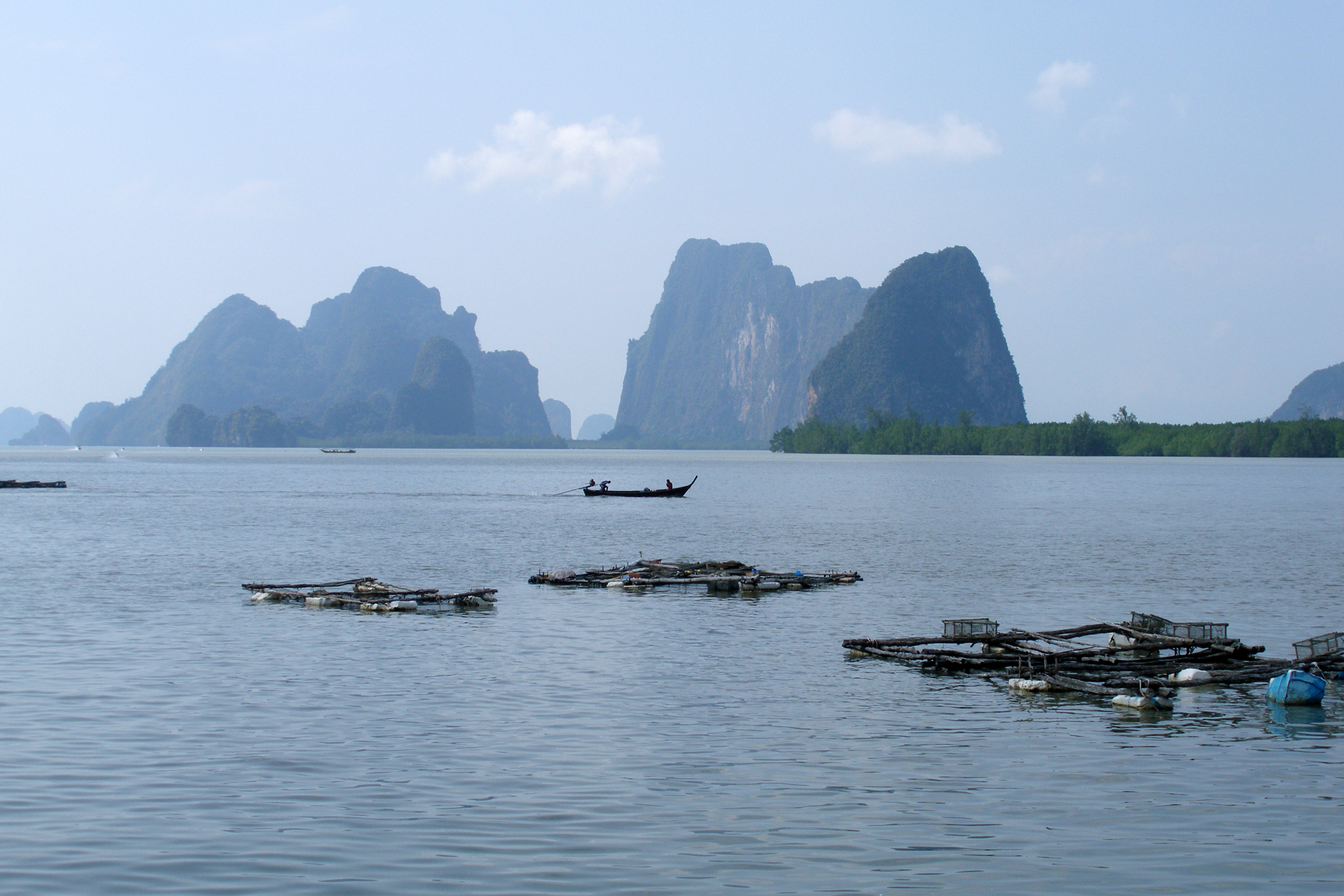
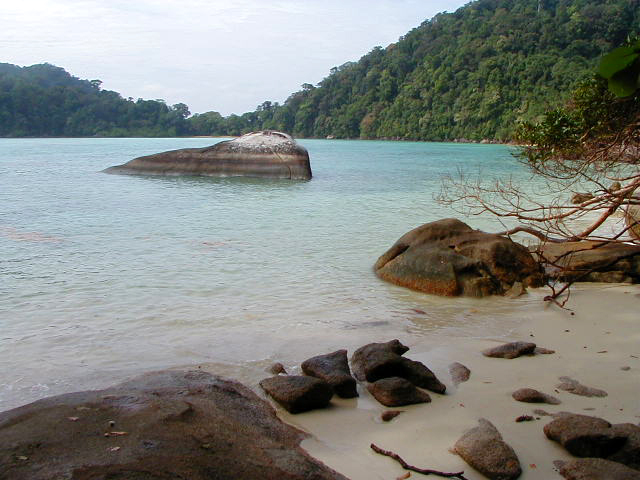
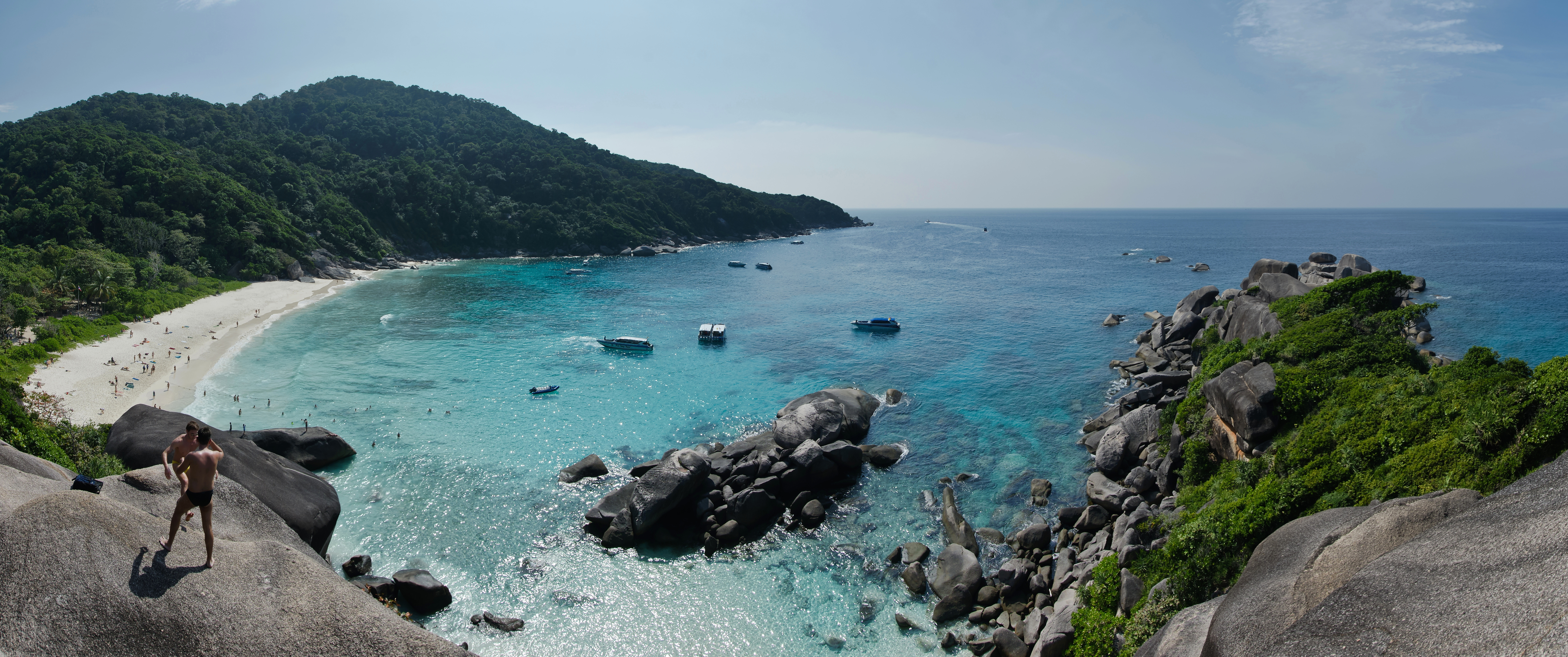
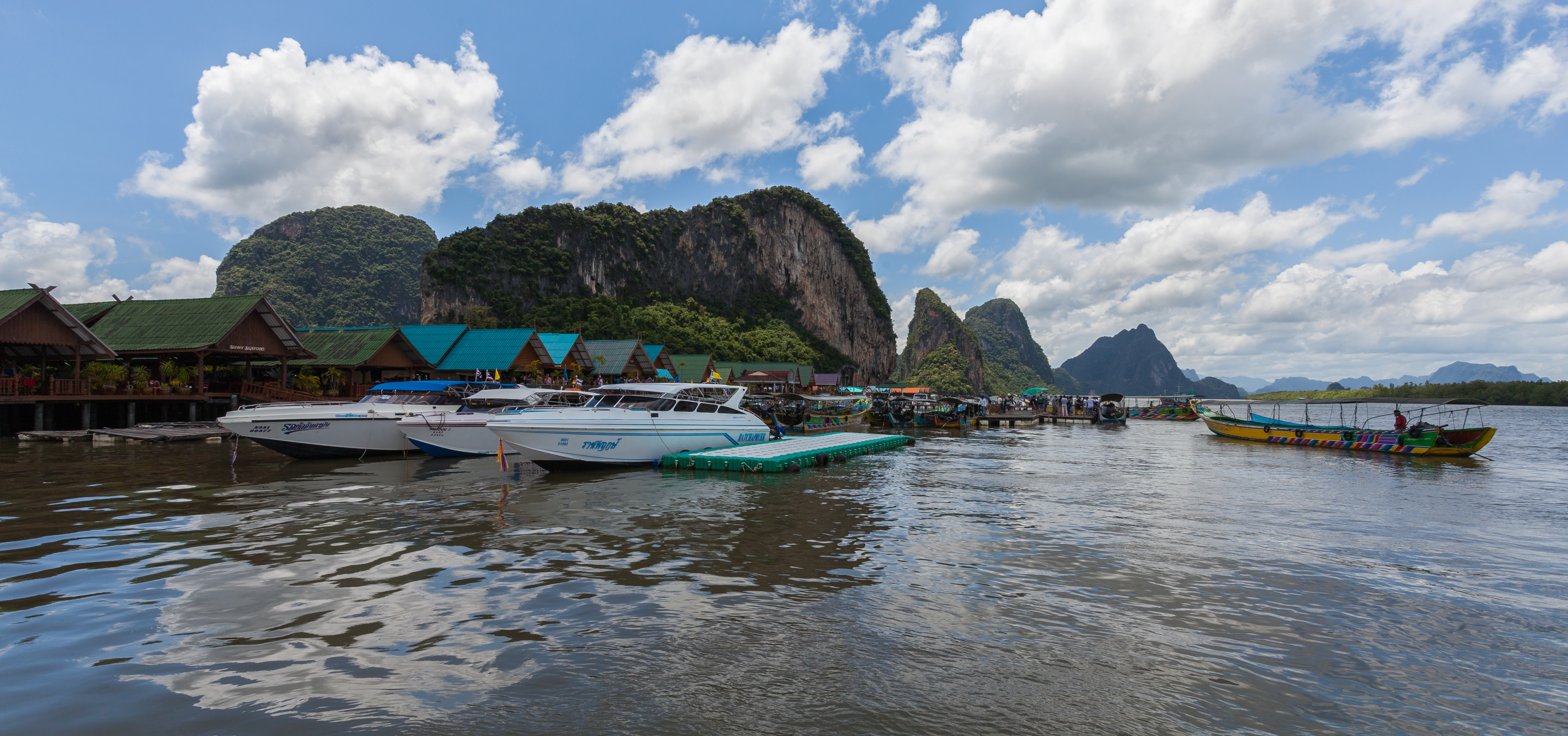
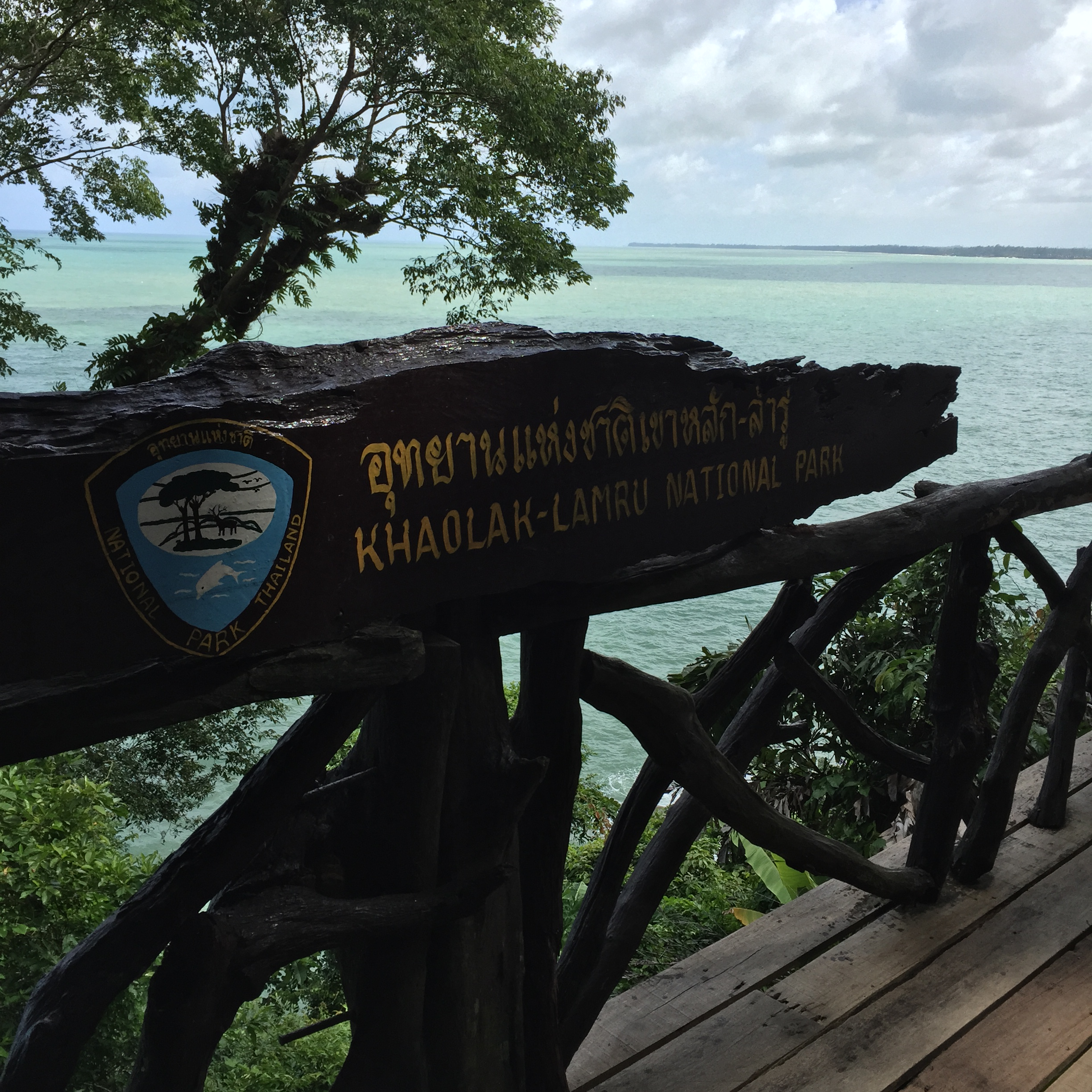
- From left to right, top to bottom : Phang Nga Bay, Surin Islands, Similan Islands, Ko Panyi, Khao Lak–Lam Ru National Park

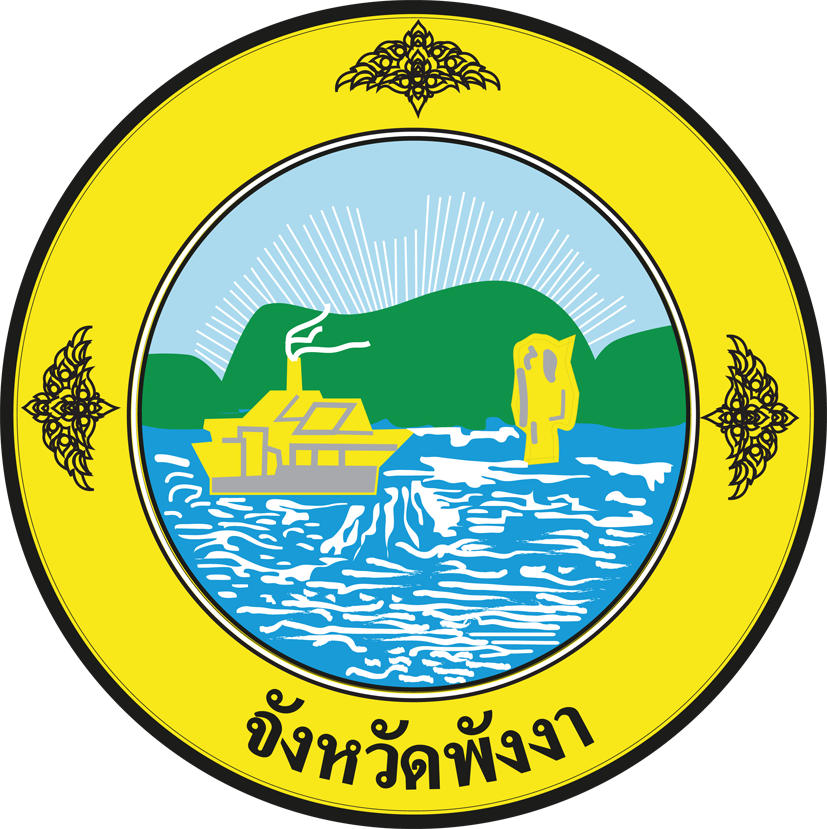
- Flag Seal
- Mottoes: แร่หมื่นล้าน บ้านกลางน้ำ ถ้ำงามตา ภูผาแปลก แมกไม้จำปูน บริบูรณ์ด้วยทรัพยากร ("Millions of minerals. Home in the water. Beautiful caves and weird cliffs. Branches of the Anaxagorea. Rich in resources.")
- Map of Thailand highlighting Phang Nga province
- Country: Thailand
- Capital: Phang Nga

Government
  - Type: Province and Provincial Administrative Organization
  - Body: Phang Nga Province and Phang Nga Provincial Administrative Organization
  - Governor: Pairat Petyuan
  - PAO Chief Executive: Bamrung Piyanamwanit

Area
  - Total: 5,495 km^{2} (2,122 sq mi)
  - Rank: 40th

Population (2024)
  - Total: ▲266,296
  - Rank: 72nd
  - Density: 48/km^{2} (120/sq mi)
  - Rank: 72nd

Human Achievement Index
  - HAI (2022): 0.6432 "average" Ranked 36th

GDP
  - Total: baht 72 billion (US$2.5 billion) (2019)
- Time zone: UTC+7 (ICT)
- Postal code: 82xxx
- Calling code: 076
- ISO 3166 code: TH-82
- Website: phangnga.go.th phangngapao.go.th

Phang Nga (Thai: พังงา, pronounced [pʰāŋ.ŋāː]) is one of the southern provinces (Changwat) of Thailand, on the shore of the Andaman Sea to the west and Phang Nga Bay to the south. Neighbouring provinces, from north and moving clockwise, are Ranong, Surat Thani, and Krabi. Towards the south of Phang Nga is the Phuket province, connected by the Sarasin Bridge.

Rock art and cave pictographs in the province reach back several thousand years, and the river mouth at Takua Pa carried a port trading in Chinese and Persian wares in the 8th and 9th centuries. The Andaman coast was among the areas worst hit by the tsunami of 2004. Six national parks lie within the province.

== Toponymy ==
Phang Nga derives its name from the ancient Malay term "Pangan", which translates to 'jungle' in contemporary Thai. This term historically referred to a broad category of indigenous peoples, colloquially known as 'orang Pangan' in Malay. This phrase was used to describe communities perceived as 'heathen, pagan, or primitive', typically residing in the dense jungle regions of the Malay Peninsula and its adjacent islands.

Two of the province’s districts are named for a metal. Yurayong and colleagues gloss the element takùa as ‘lead’, reading Takua Pa as ‘lead forest’ and Takua Thung as ‘lead field’, and take the names to reflect the lead in the ground there. They make the point about a lead seal inscribed in Brāhmī with the local name Pākabi, found at Khao Sam Kaeo on the other side of the peninsula. Lead is common in southern Thailand and uncommon in South Asia.

== Geography ==
The province, located on the western side of the Malay Peninsula, encompasses the islands within Phang Nga Bay. Among these, Khao Phing Kan and Ko Ta Pu, often referred to as "James Bond Island", gained prominence following their appearance in the 1974 film The Man with the Golden Gun. In this film, Khao Phing Kan serves as the base for the antagonist, with the distinct, needle-shaped limestone formation of Ko Ta Pu, situated approximately 20 metres (22 yd) off the main beach, featuring significantly. To safeguard these and other islands, the Ao Phang Nga (Phang Nga Bay) National Park was established in 1981. The province also includes the Similan Islands and Surin Islands, notable diving destinations in Thailand. The total forested area of the province is approximately 1,778 km^{2} (686 sq mi), accounting for 32.4 percent of its total area.

== History ==
Ships are painted among the pictographs of Nakha cave, which have been dated to about three thousand years ago. Rock art has been recorded at twenty-eight sites in Phang Nga and neighbouring Krabi; shell specimens place the paintings of Phang Nga Bay between about 5,000 and 3,000 years ago.

Thung Tuek has been identified as one of the places where glass beads imitating gold-glass were made. Peter Francis traced the type to workshops there, at Siraf, and at Berenike in Egypt. Beads of it are recorded at Dvaravati-period sites in central Thailand and at Laem Pho in Chaiya. The mouth of the Takua Pa carried the paired sites of Mueang Thong and Ko Kho Khao, where Tang glazed ware, Persian turquoise-glazed ware and mosaic glass beads of the 8th and 9th centuries have been recovered. Laure Dussubieux and Bernard Gratuze place Takua Pa among the late sites in their scheme of glass supply to Southeast Asia. In that phase mineral soda-alumina glass of South Asian origin displaced the types that had circulated earlier.

During the reign of King Rama II, the region surrounding Thalang (currently known as Phuket) fell under Burmese occupation, leading to a significant influx of refugees into Kraphu Nga. Following the successful expulsion of Burmese forces by Siamese troops in 1824, King Rama III renamed the area adjacent to the bay as Phang Nga. This adaptation from the Malay word "pangan" suggests the historical presence of Malay people as indigenous groups in the region. In 1933, the town was elevated to the status of a province.

On the morning of 26 December 2004, the Andaman Sea coastline of Phang Nga Province experienced severe devastation due to a tsunami, resulting in extensive loss of life.

Khura Buri District, and particularly Ko Phra Thong, referred to as smuggler's paradise, has been identified as a critical point of entry for illegal activities in Thailand, including human trafficking. This area is reportedly a transit route for various groups, including Rohingya, Uighur, and Syrian refugees seeking entry into Thailand.

== Symbols ==
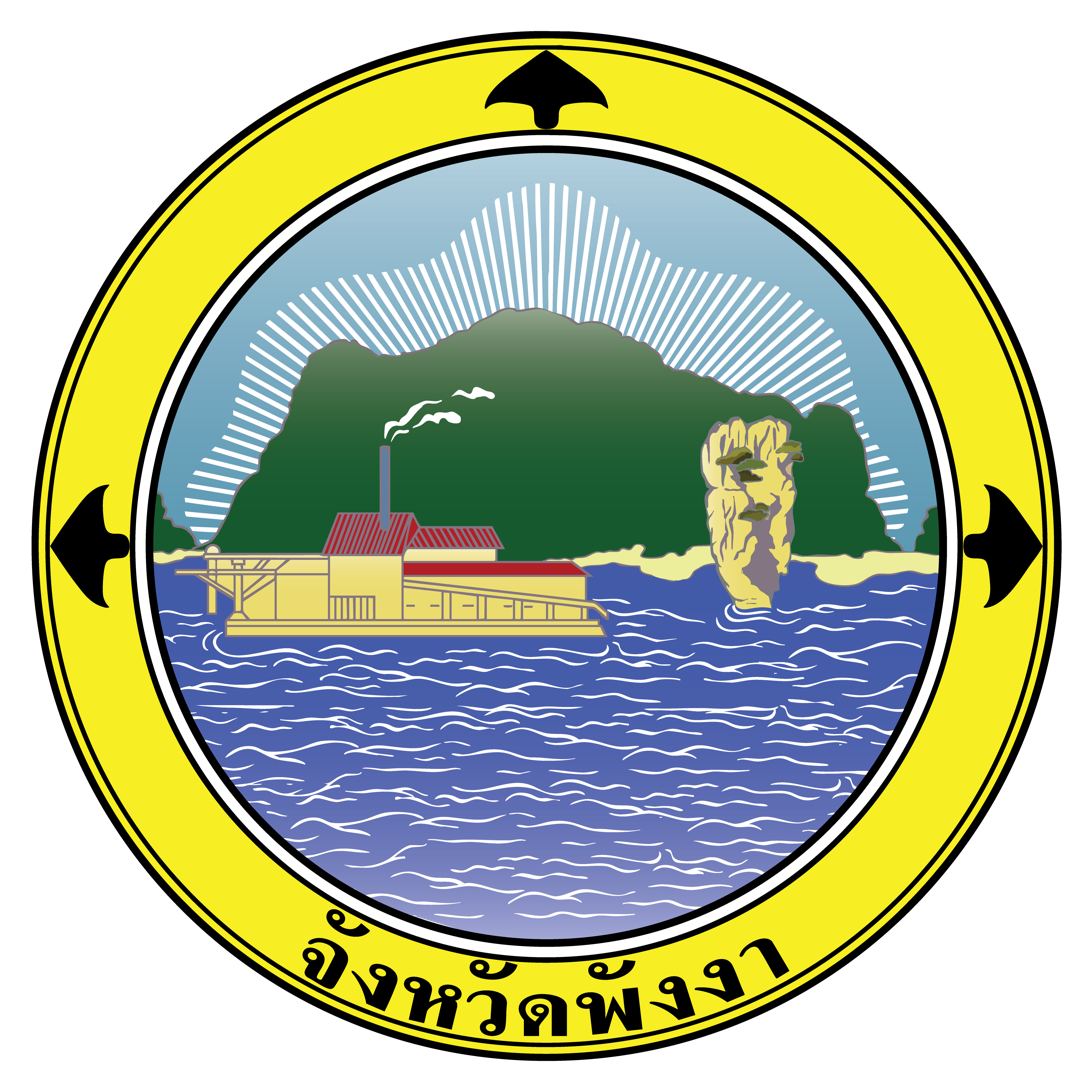
Provincial seal of Phang Nga

The official seal of the province features an illustration of the Phu Khao Chang mountains, set as a backdrop to the depiction of the city hall. Additionally, the seal includes an image of a dredge, symbolizing the province's history of tin mining.

The provincial slogan encapsulates various aspects of the region's identity and heritage: "Massive mining industry, Ban Klang Nam 'floating house', delightful caves, strangely shaped hills, Jampun flower, rich in resources". This slogan reflects the diverse elements that define the province, from its industrial past to its unique natural and cultural features.

In terms of regional flora, the province has designated Cinnamomum porrectum, commonly known as hardy cinnamon, as its official tree. The provincial flower is Anaxagorea javanica, further emphasizing the area's rich botanical diversity. Many beaches in Phang Nga are marine turtle nesting grounds, and on the ground, the provincial aquatic life is the green sea turtle (Chelonia mydas).

== Administrative divisions ==
=== Provincial government ===
Phang Nga is divided into eight districts (amphoes), which are further divided into 48 subdistricts (tambons) and 314 villages (mubans).

Map of eight districts
Map of eight districts	No.	Name	Thai	Malay
Map of eight districts	1.	Mueang Phang Nga	เมืองพังงา	Pangan
Map of eight districts	2.	Koh Yao	เกาะยาว	Pulau Panjang
Map of eight districts	3.	Kapong	กะปง	Kampong
Map of eight districts	4.	Takua Thung	ตะกั่วทุ่ง	-
Map of eight districts	5.	Takua Pa	ตะกั่วป่า	-
Map of eight districts	6.	Khura Buri	คุระบุรี	-
Map of eight districts	7.	Thap Put	ทับปุด	-
Map of eight districts	8.	Thai Mueang	ท้ายเหมือง	-

=== Local government ===
As of 26 November 2019, there are: one Phang Nga Provincial Administration Organisation (ongkan borihan suan changwat) and 15 municipal (thesaban) areas in the province. Phang Nga and Takua Pa have town (thesaban mueang) status. Further 13 subdistrict municipalities (thesaban tambon). The non-municipal areas are administered by 36 Subdistrict Administrative Organisations - SAO (ongkan borihan suan tambon).

== Transportation ==
Transportation in Phang Nga Province is primarily facilitated through a network of highways.

- Roads: Highway 4 is the main artery connecting most districts within the province, excluding Kapong and Ko Yao. Highway 401 provides a route to Surat Thani, while Highway 402 links Phang Nga with Phuket Province. Additionally, Highway 4090 connects Muang to Kapong District.
- Railways: Rail transport is absent in Phang Nga Province. The closest railway station is located in the Phunphin District of Surat Thani Province.
- Bus: These services in the province offer frequent connections to Bangkok and other regions. Intra-provincial travel is supported by non-air-conditioned buses.
- Public transit: Songthaews are the predominant form of public transit within Phang Nga, offering accessible transportation options to the local population.
- Motorbike-taxi: They are primarily found in Phang Nga town, cater to short-distance travel, with fares varying based on distance.
- Airport: As of now, Phang Nga Province does not have an airport. The nearest facility is Phuket International Airport. Plans for a new airport in Phang Nga have been proposed, with the intention of serving not only Phang Nga but also neighboring Krabi Province and as an alternative to Phuket's existing airport.

== Human achievement index 2022 ==
Health	Education	Employment	Income
21	41	77	24
Housing	Family	Transport	Participation
41	60	12	10
Province Phang Nga, with an HAI 2022 value of 0.6432 is "average", and occupies place 36 in the ranking.

Since 2003, United Nations Development Programme (UNDP) in Thailand has tracked progress on human development at the sub-national level using the Human achievement index (HAI), a composite index covering all the eight key areas of human development. The National Economic and Social Development Board (NESDB) has taken over this task since 2017.

Rank	Classification
1–13	"high"
14–29	"somewhat high"
30–45	"average"
46–61	"somewhat low"
62–77	"low"

Map with provinces and HAI 2022 rankings

== National parks ==
Region 5 (Nakhon Si Thammarat) of Thailand's protected areas holds twenty national parks. Six of them lie in Phang Nga province, and they range from coastal and marine to mountainous and forested country.

- Ao Phang Nga (Phang Nga Bay) National Park (อุทยานแห่งชาติอ่าวพังงา), officially designated on 29 April 1981, spans an area of approximately 400 square kilometers (150 sq mi), equivalent to 250,000 rai. This park is distinguished by its picturesque landscapes, notably featuring a multitude of limestone formations rising majestically from the sea near the coast. These geological structures also account for the high concentration of caves within the park's boundaries. The area is rich in mangrove forests, contributing to its ecological diversity. Additionally, the park encompasses several islands, each contributing to the overall scenic and biological richness of Ao Phang Nga National Park. Visitors in fiscal year 2024: 530,204.
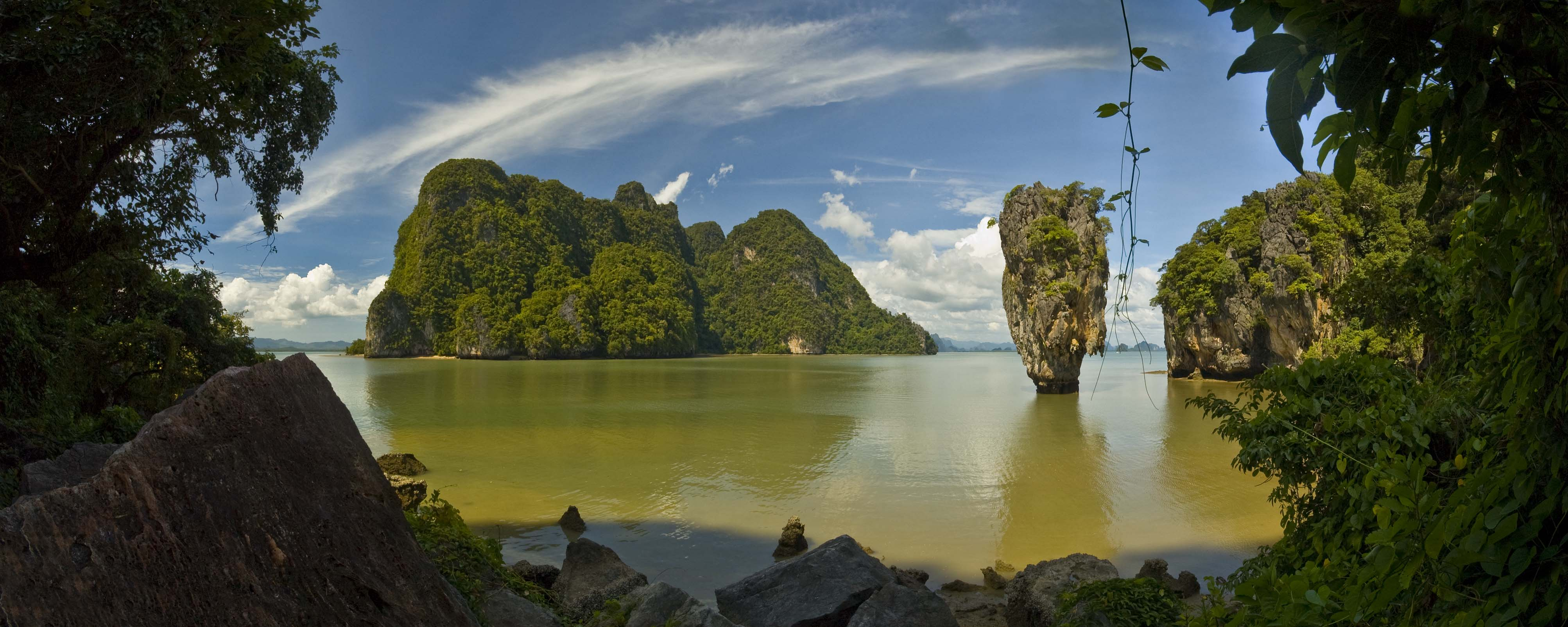
Mushroom Rock Island and Ko Tapu (James Bond Island), Phang Nga Bay
Ao Phang Nga National Park
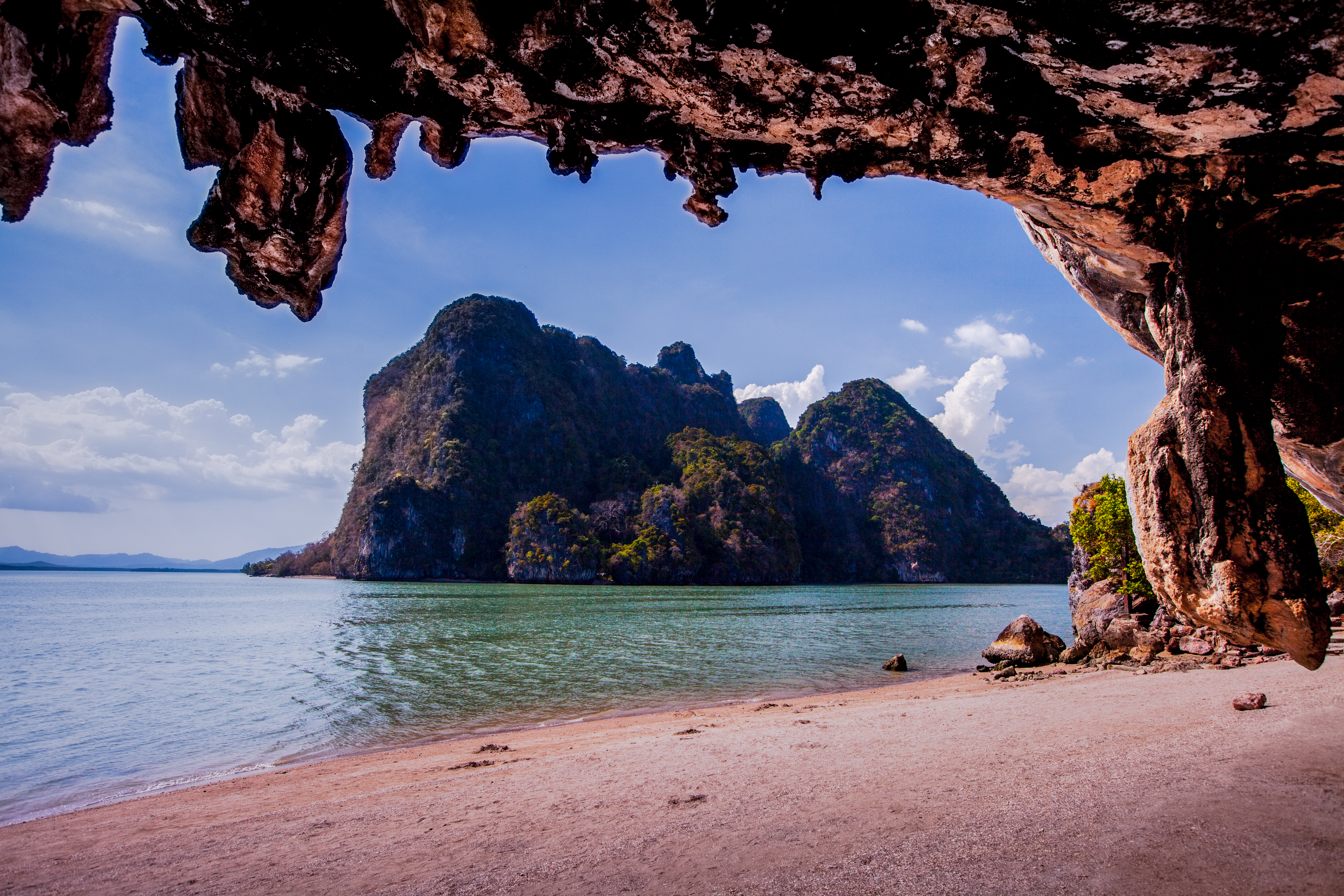
Phang-nga National Park

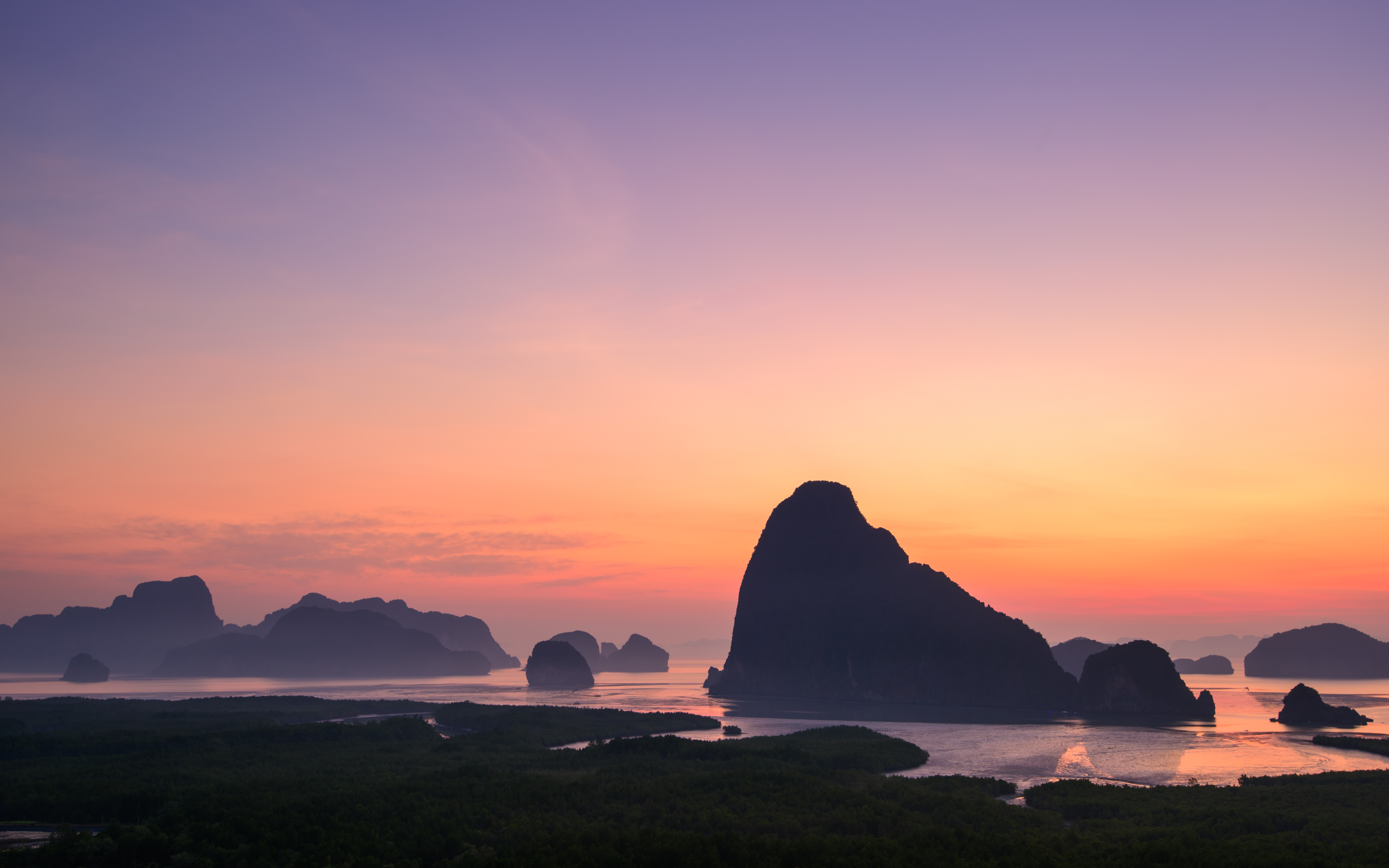
Limestone islets in Phang-nga National Park

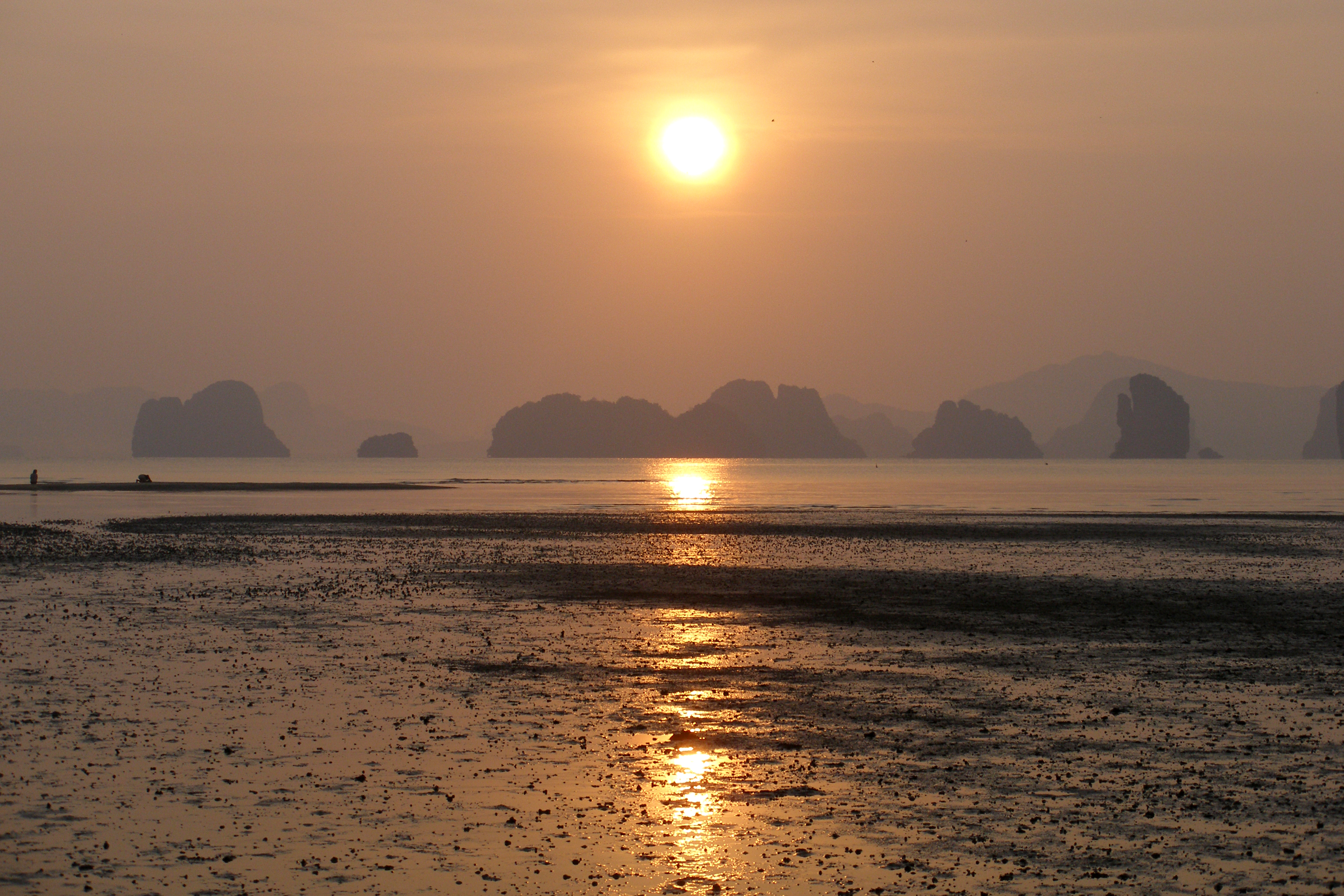
Sunset in Phang Nga Bay

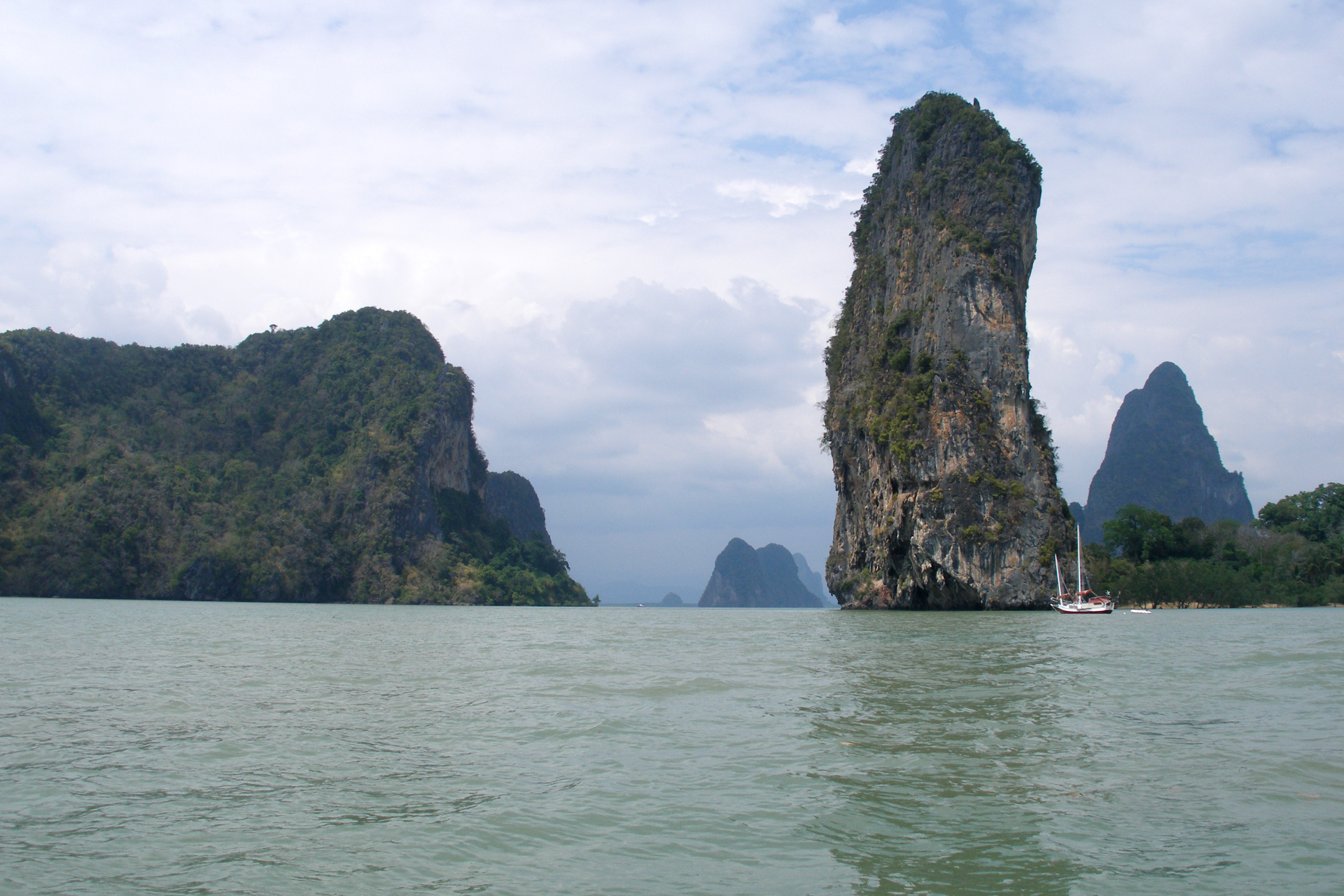
Karst formations
- Mu Ko Similan National Park (อุทยานแห่งชาติหมู่เกาะสิมิลัน) was declared a national park on 1 September 1982. The park, spanning around 140 square kilometers (54 sq mi) or 87,500 rai, consists of the Similan Islands, a group of nine islands. The park is closed annually from 16 May to 31 October for ecological recovery and maintenance. Visitors in fiscal year 2024: 578,535.
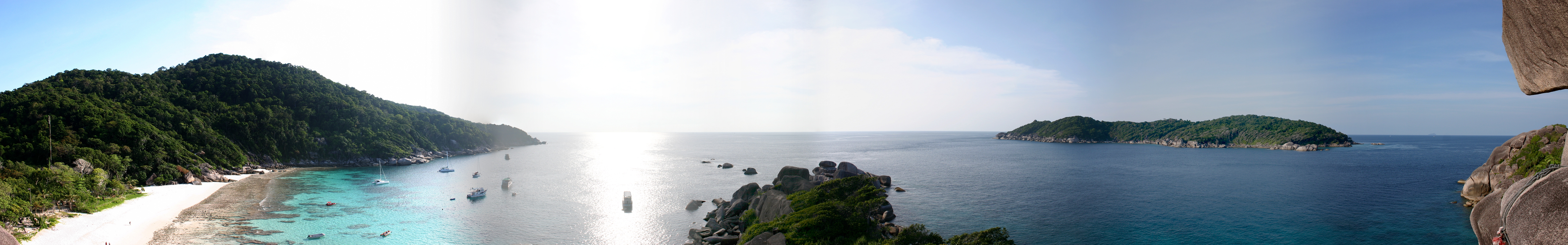
Panorama from Similan Islands in the Andaman Sea
Ocean Animal at Mu Ko Similan National Park
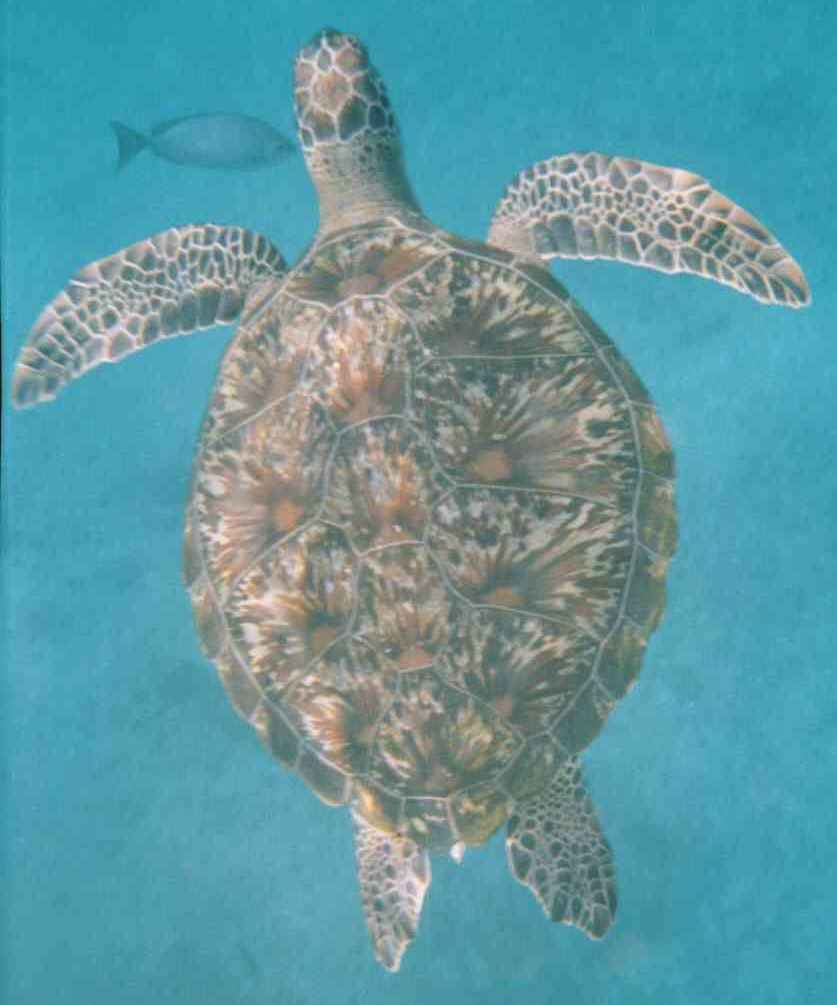
Turtle at Similan

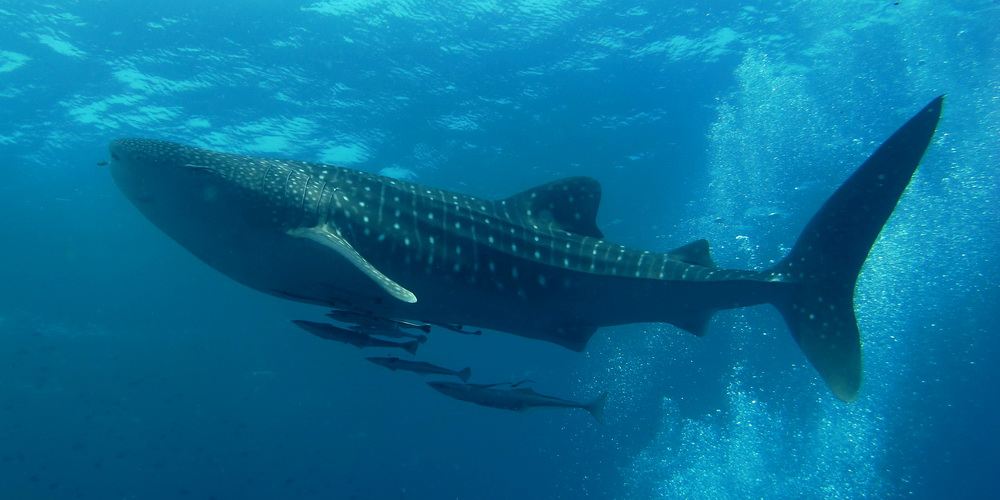
Whale shark at Similan

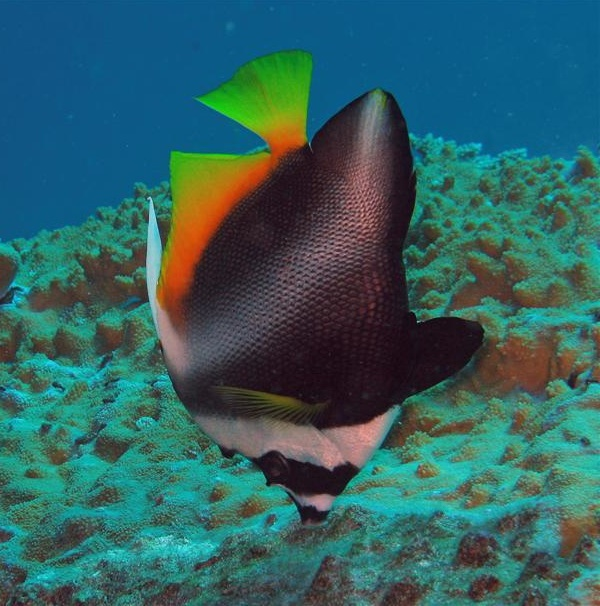
Phantom Bannerfish at Similan
- Mu Ko Surin National Park (อุทยานแห่งชาติหมู่เกาะสุรินทร์), formally established on 9 July 1981, encompasses an archipelago consisting of five islands: Ko Surin Nuea, Ko Surin Tai, Ko Ri, Ko Khai, and Ko Klang. The park covers an area of approximately 141 square kilometers (54 sq mi), equivalent to 88,282 rai. Located in the Andaman Sea, close to the maritime border between Thailand and Myanmar, the archipelago is known for its rich marine life and coral reefs. Visitors in fiscal year 2024: 77,609.

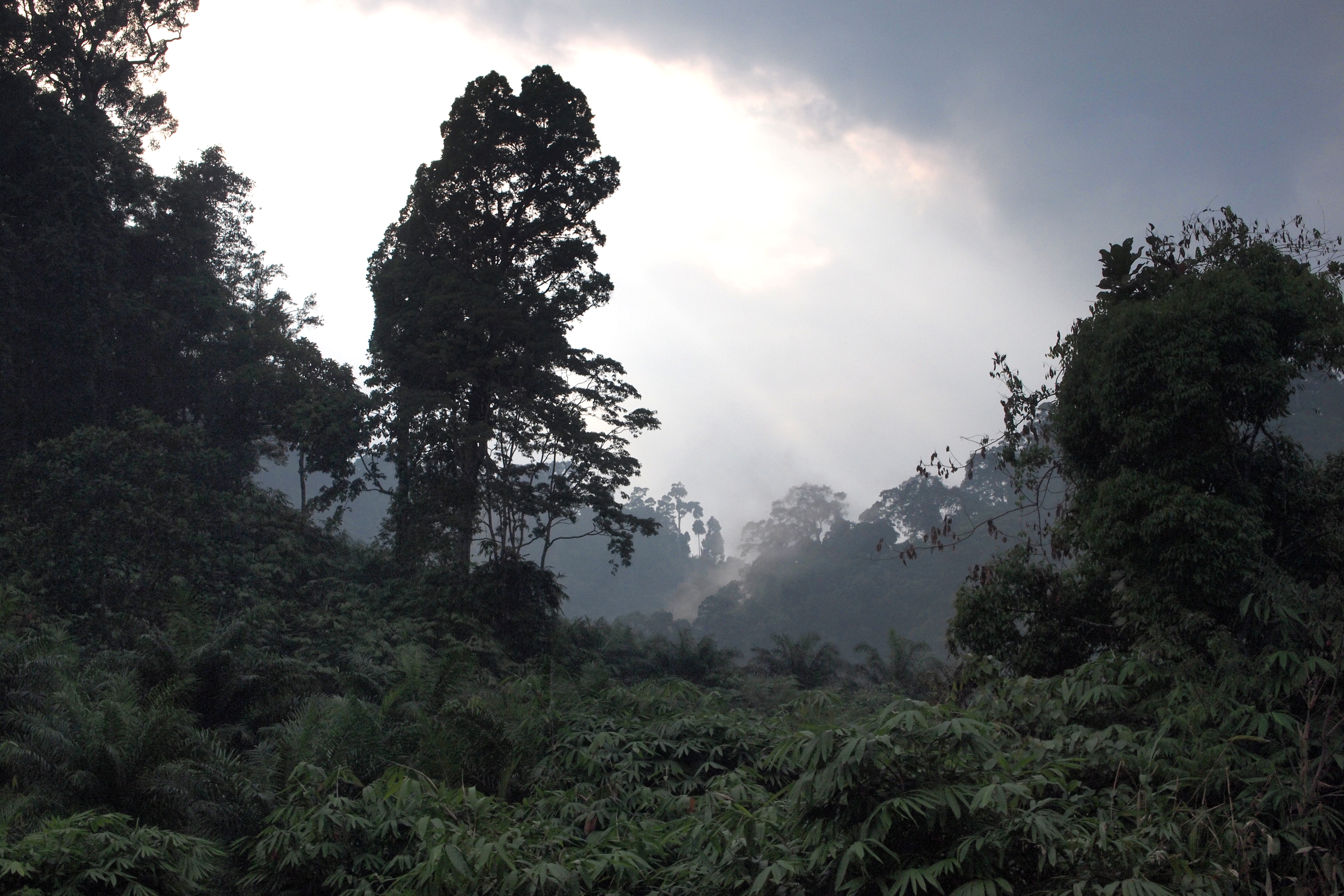
Khao Lak-Lam Ru jungle.

- Khao Lak–Lam Ru National Park (อุทยานแห่งชาติเขาหลัก-ลำรู่) was established on 30 August 1991, encompassing an area of approximately 125 square kilometers (48 sq mi) or 78,125 rai. The park extends across Thai Mueang, Kapong, Takua Pa, and Mueang Districts. Notable sites within the park include Khao Lak, home to the Chao Pho Khao Lak Shrine, Laem Pakarang, known for its pine groves and suitability for camping and relaxation, and the Ton Chong Fa Waterfall (Namtok Ton Chong Fa). Visitors in fiscal year 2024: 78,355.
- Khao Lampi–Hat Thai Mueang National Park (อุทยานแห่งชาติเขาลำปี-หาดท้ายเหมือง), designated on 14 April 1988, covers about 72 square kilometers (28 sq mi), or 44,950 rai. Key attractions in the park are the year-round Namtok Lampi, a 6-tiered waterfall; Namtok Ton Phrai, another perennial waterfall; and Hat Thai Mueang beach, the annual site of the Sea Turtle Festival. Visitors in fiscal year 2024: 72,765.
- Si Phang Nga National Park (อุทยานแห่งชาติศรีพังงา), designated as a national park on 16 April 1988, spans an area of about 246 square kilometers (95 sq mi) or 153,800 rai. The park's landscape is characterized by its rugged mountainous terrain, predominantly covered with dipterocarp forests. These natural features contribute to the park's biodiversity and its status as a significant ecological area. Visitors in fiscal year 2024: 21,509.

== Wildlife sanctuary ==
There is one wildlife sanctuary, along with three other wildlife sanctuaries, makeup region 5 (Nakhon Si Thammarat) of Thailand's protected areas.

- Namtok Song Phraek Wildlife Sanctuary occupies an area of 138,712 rai ~ 222 square kilometers (86 sq mi). The wildlife sanctuary was previously known as Ton Pariwat wildlife sanctuary and covers Kapong district, Mueang Phang Nga district, and Thap Put district.

Location protected areas of Phang Nga

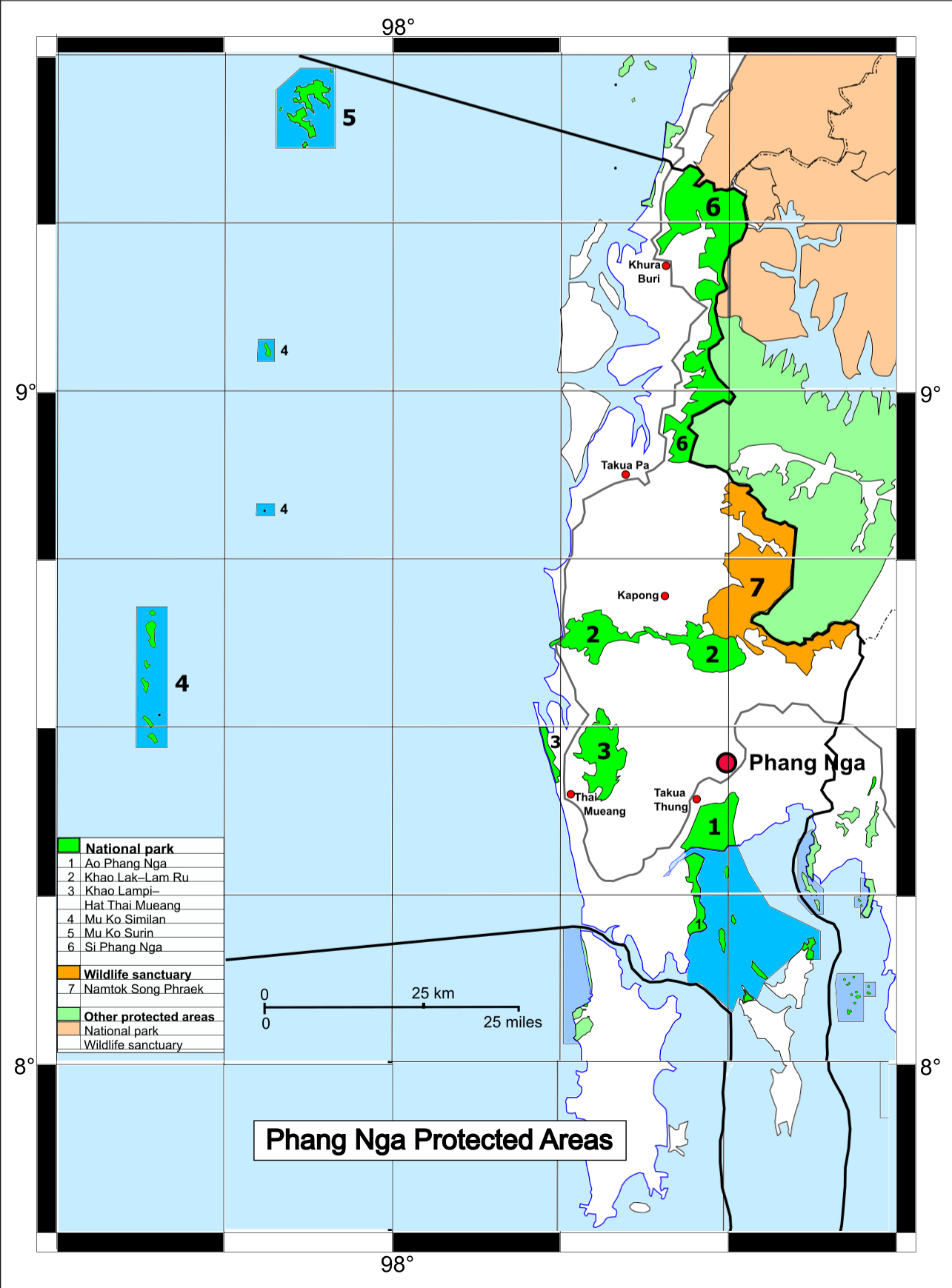
Phang Nga protected areas

	National park
1	Ao Phang Nga
2	Khao Lak-Lam Ru
3	Khao Lampi-Hat Thai Mueang
4	Mu Ko Similan
5	Mu Ko Surin
6	Si Phang Nga

	Wildlife sanctuary
7	Namtok Song Phraek

== Gallery ==
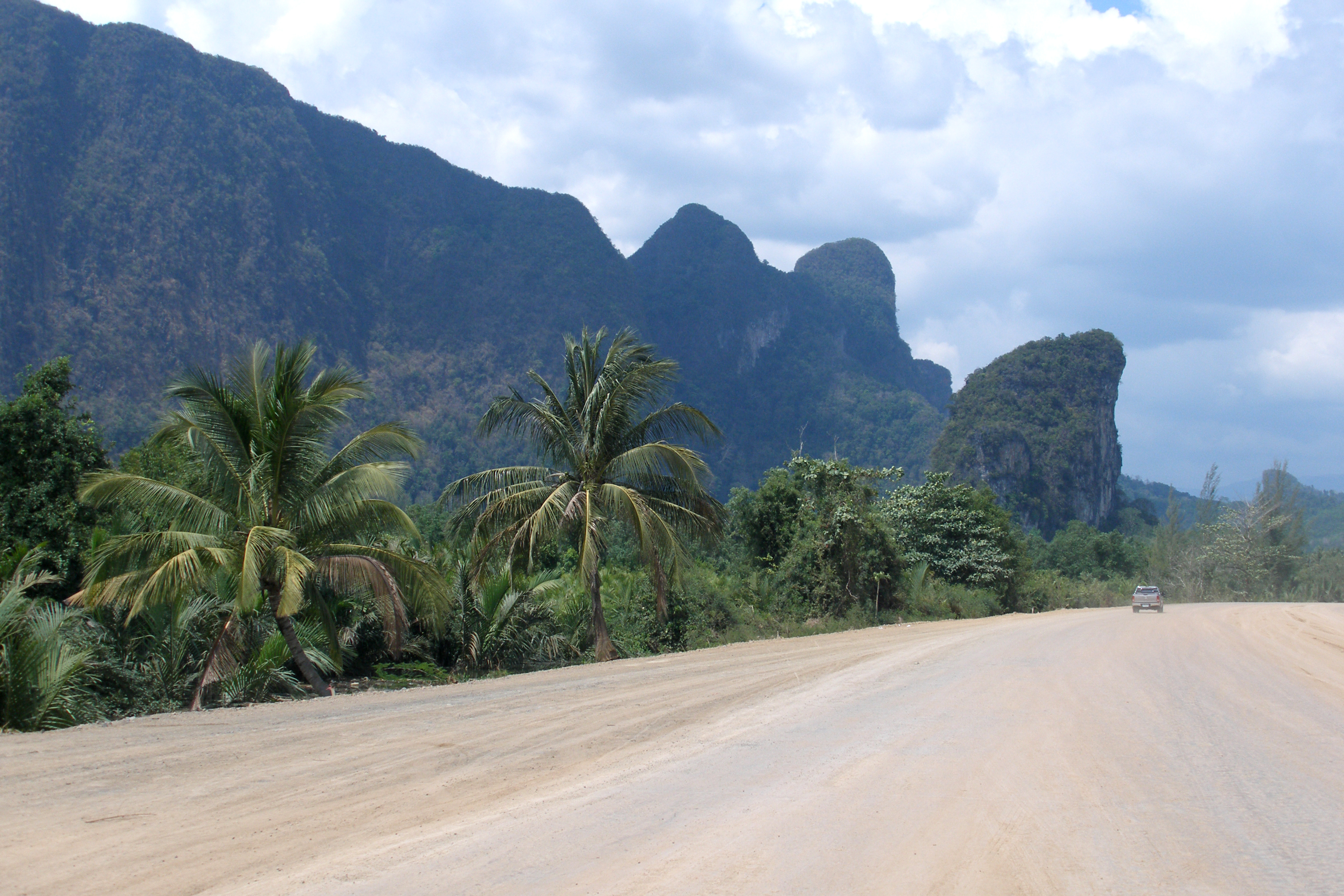
Dusty road around Phang Nga town

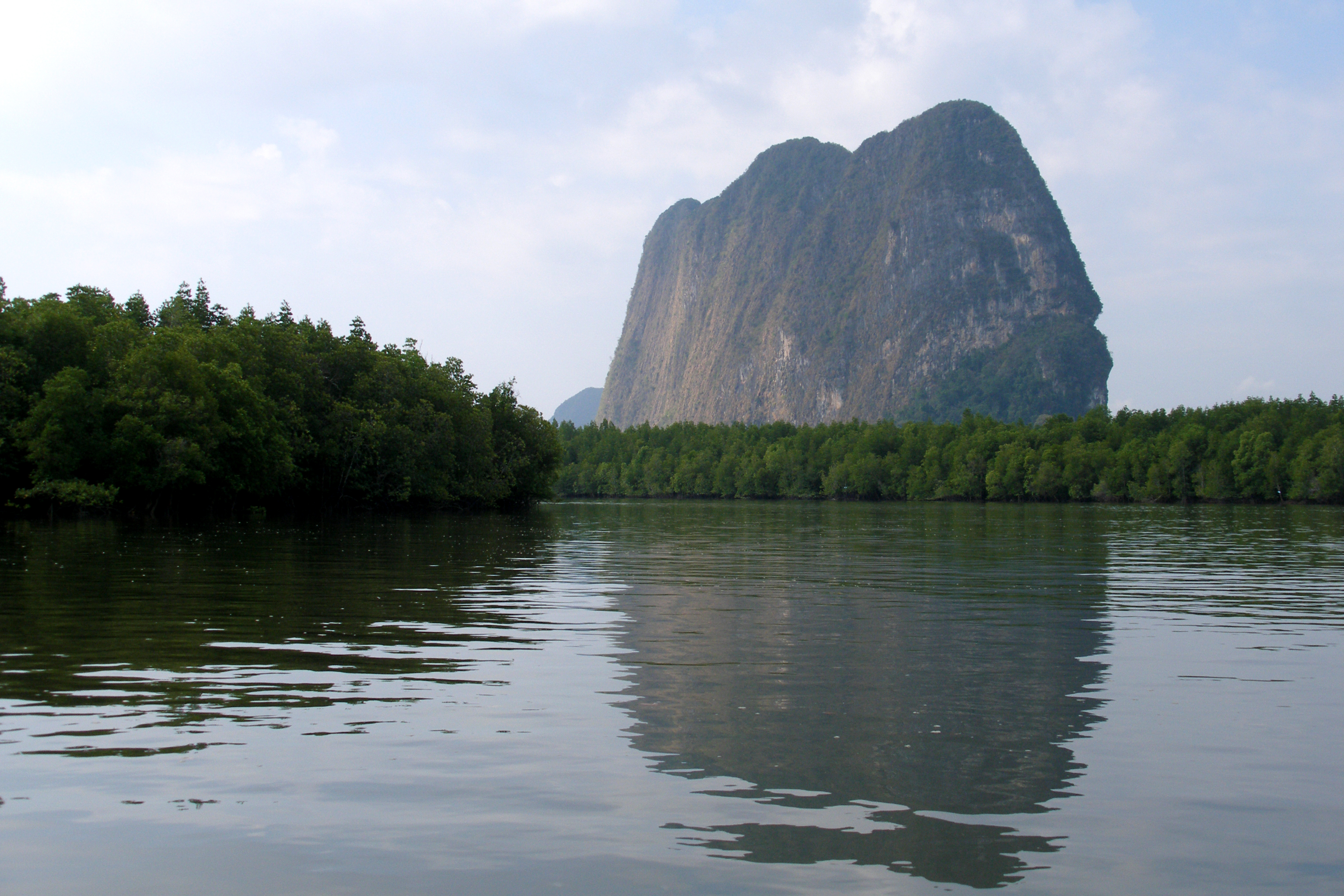
Northern entrance to Phang Nga Bay

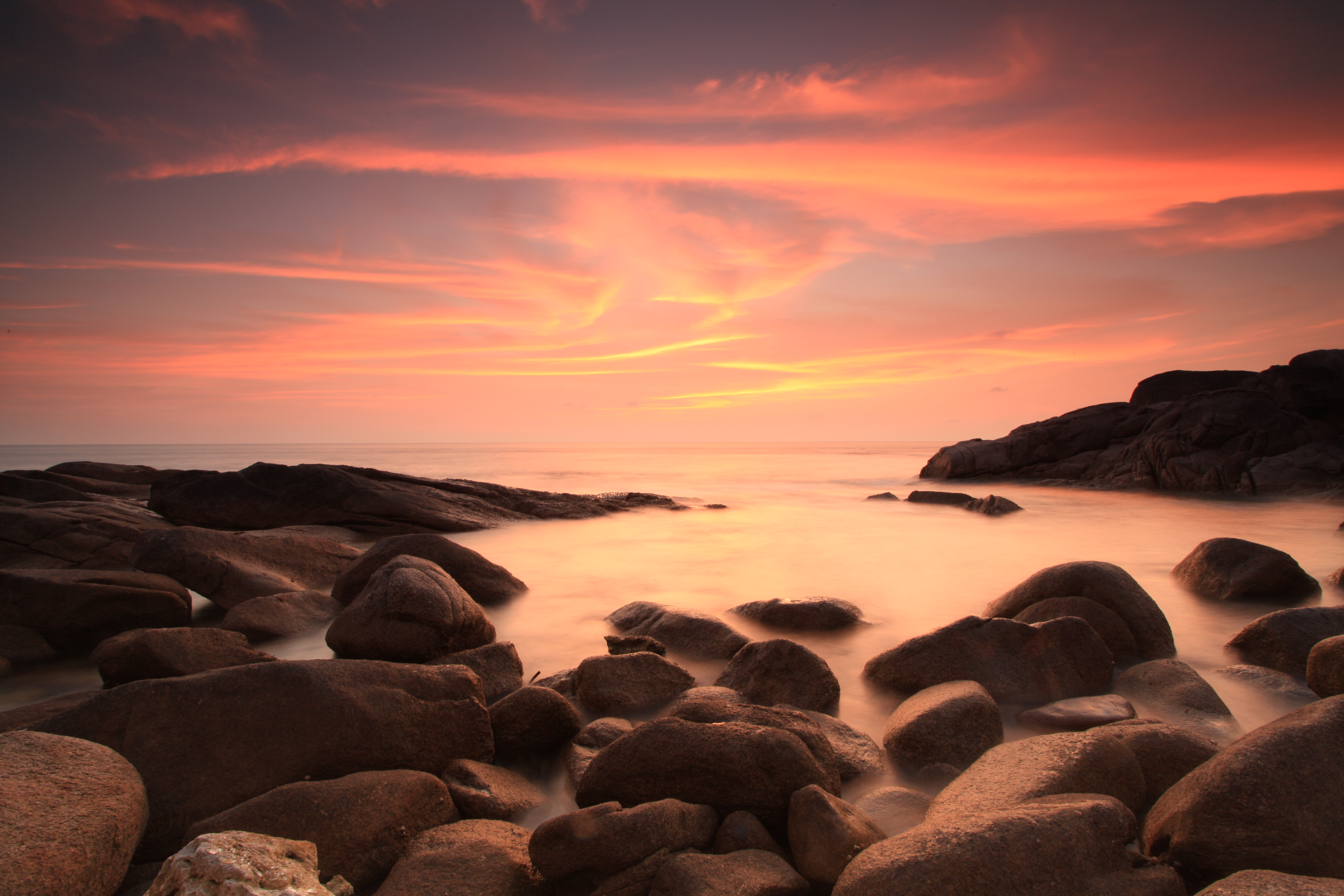
Mu Ko Similan National Park

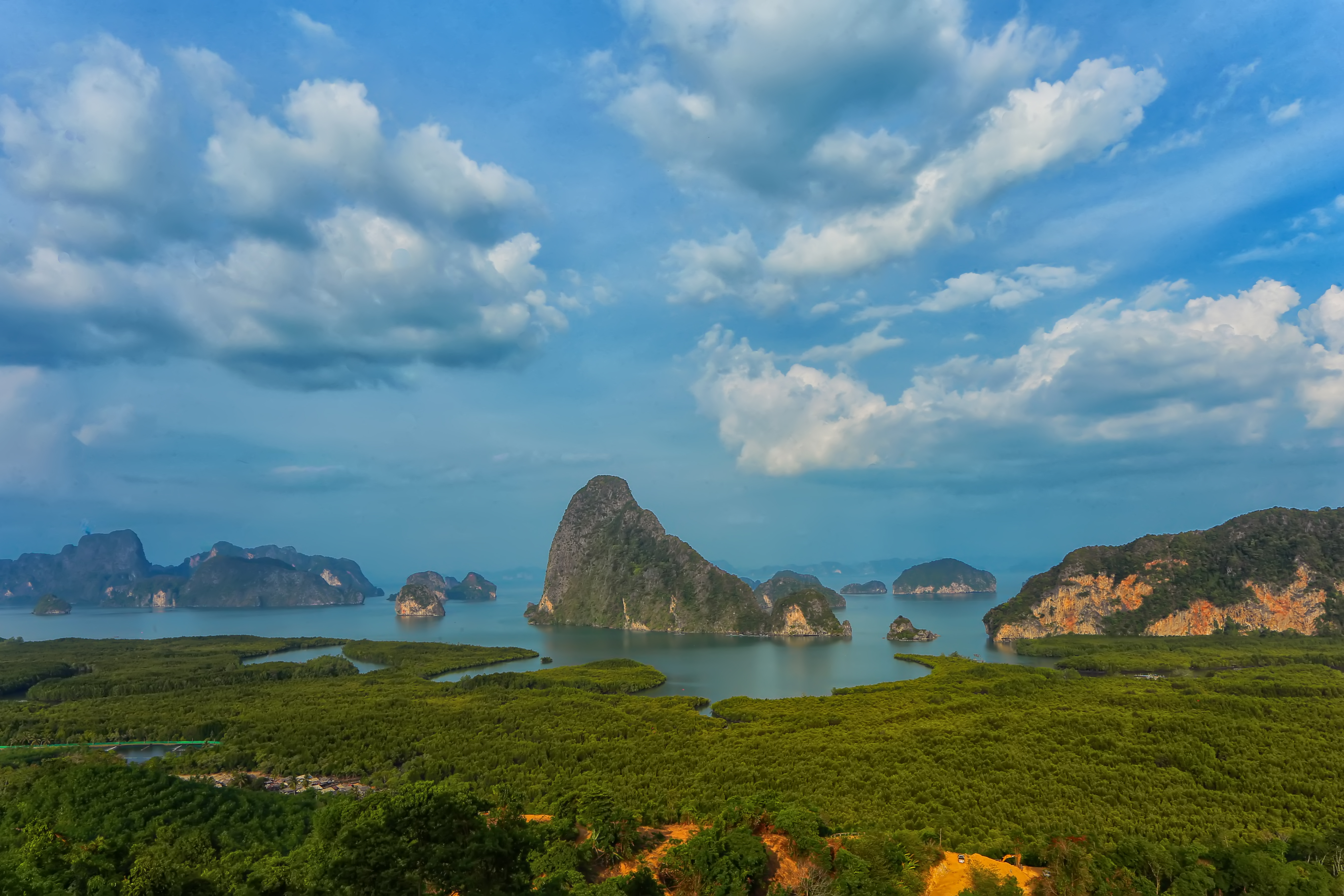
Limestone islets in Phangnga Bay

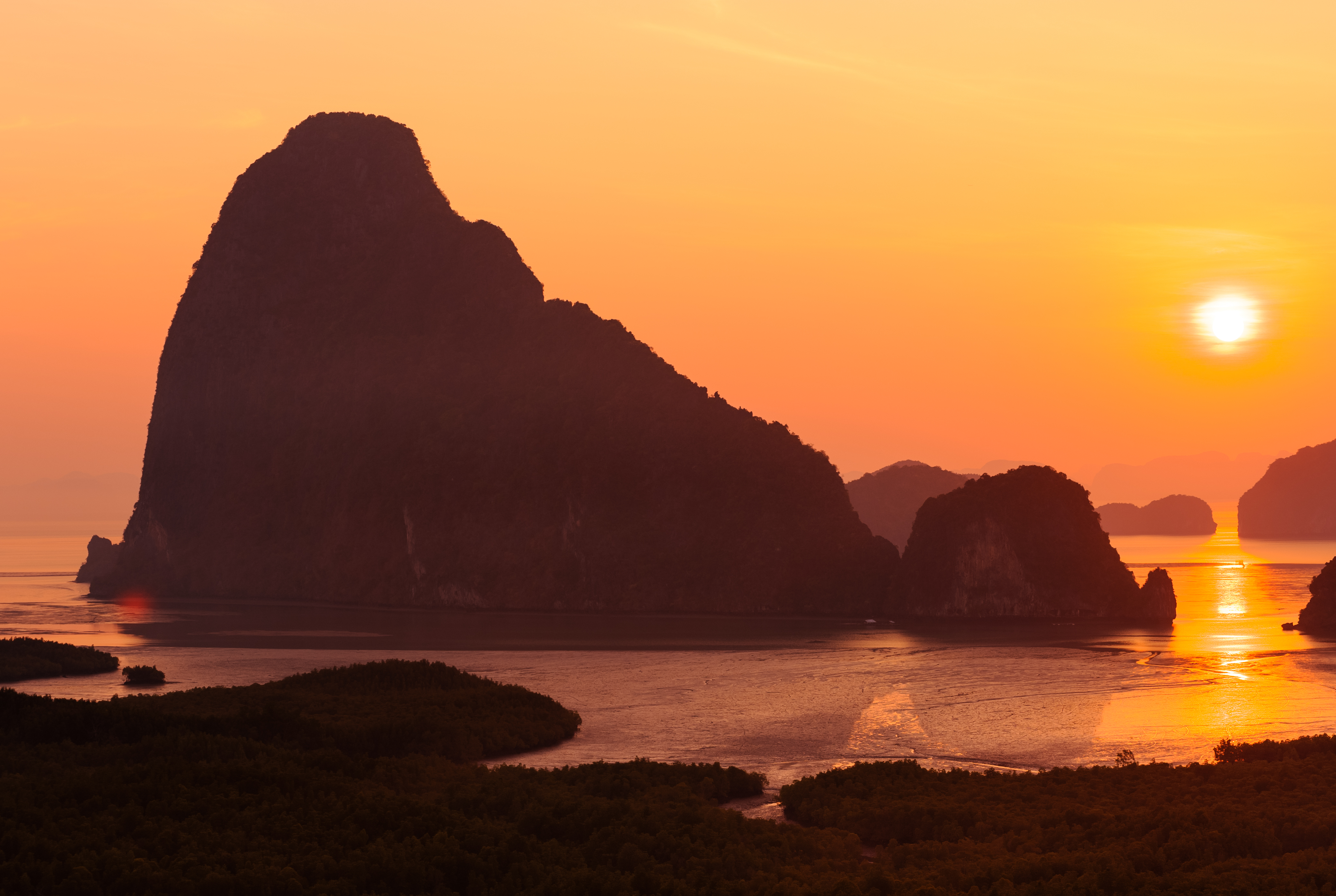
Limestone islets in Phangnga Bay, Ao Phangnga National Park

Emerald lagoon in Phang Nga Bay

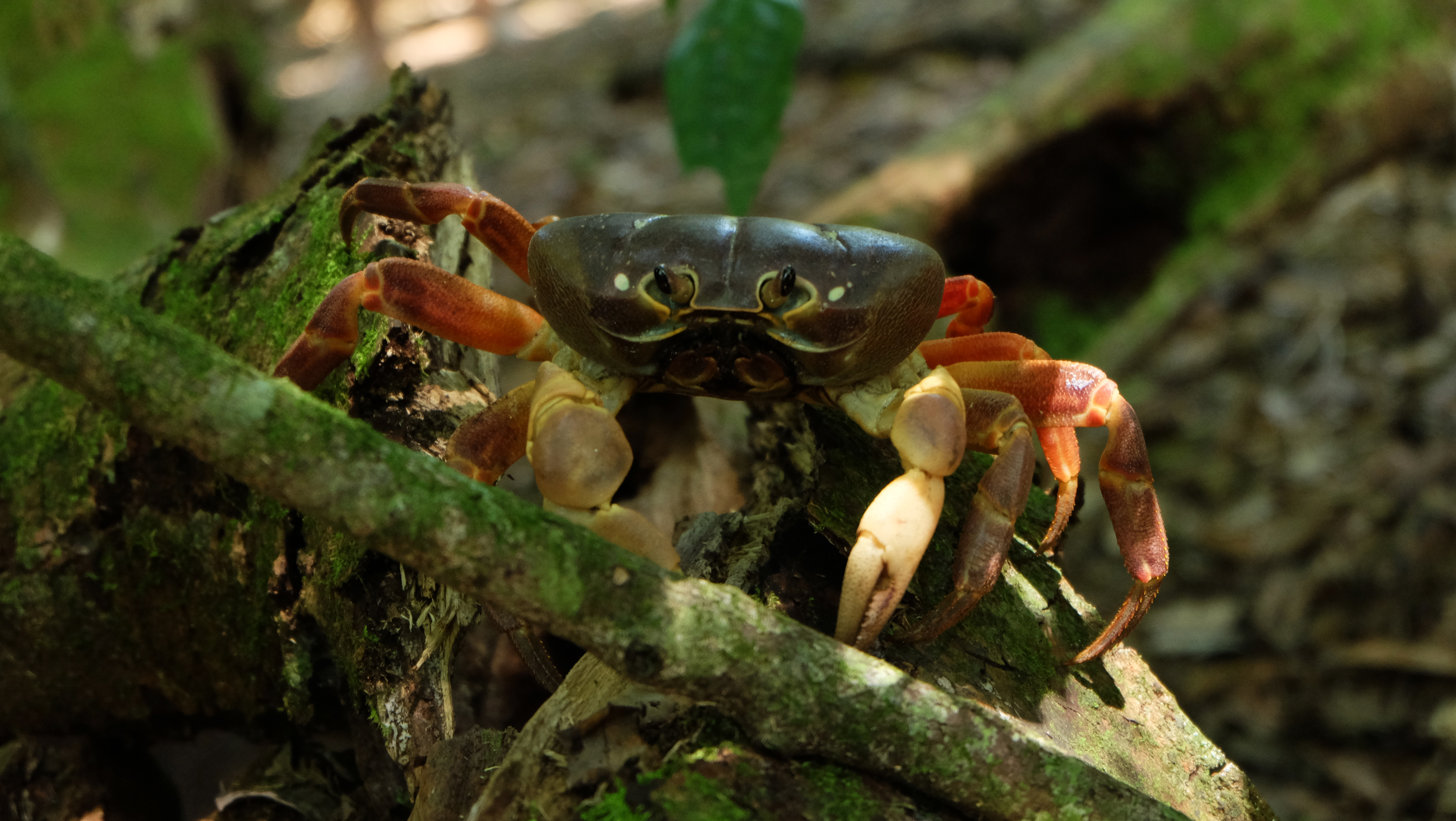
Cardisoma carnifex at Similan Islands

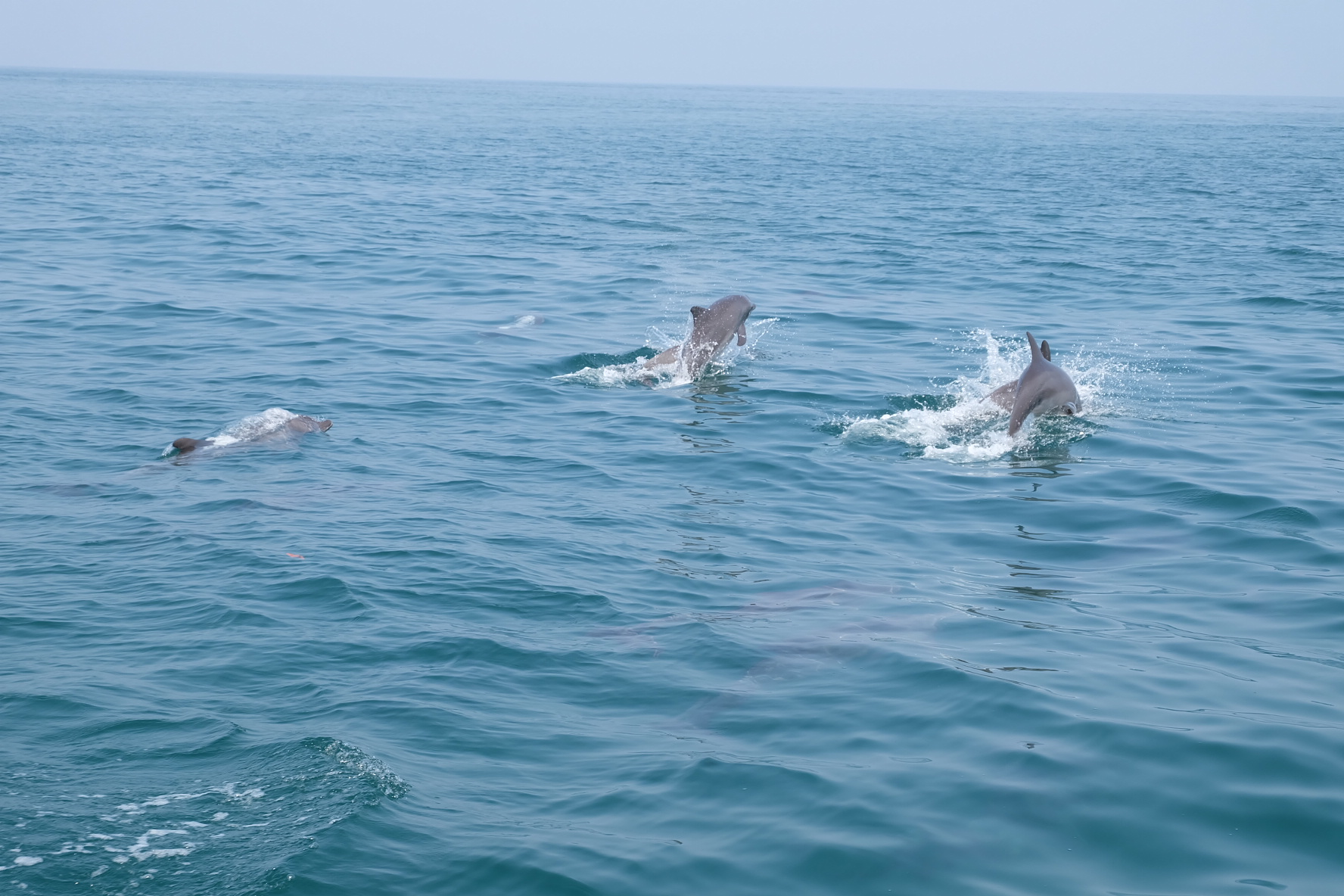
Dolphins at Surin Island

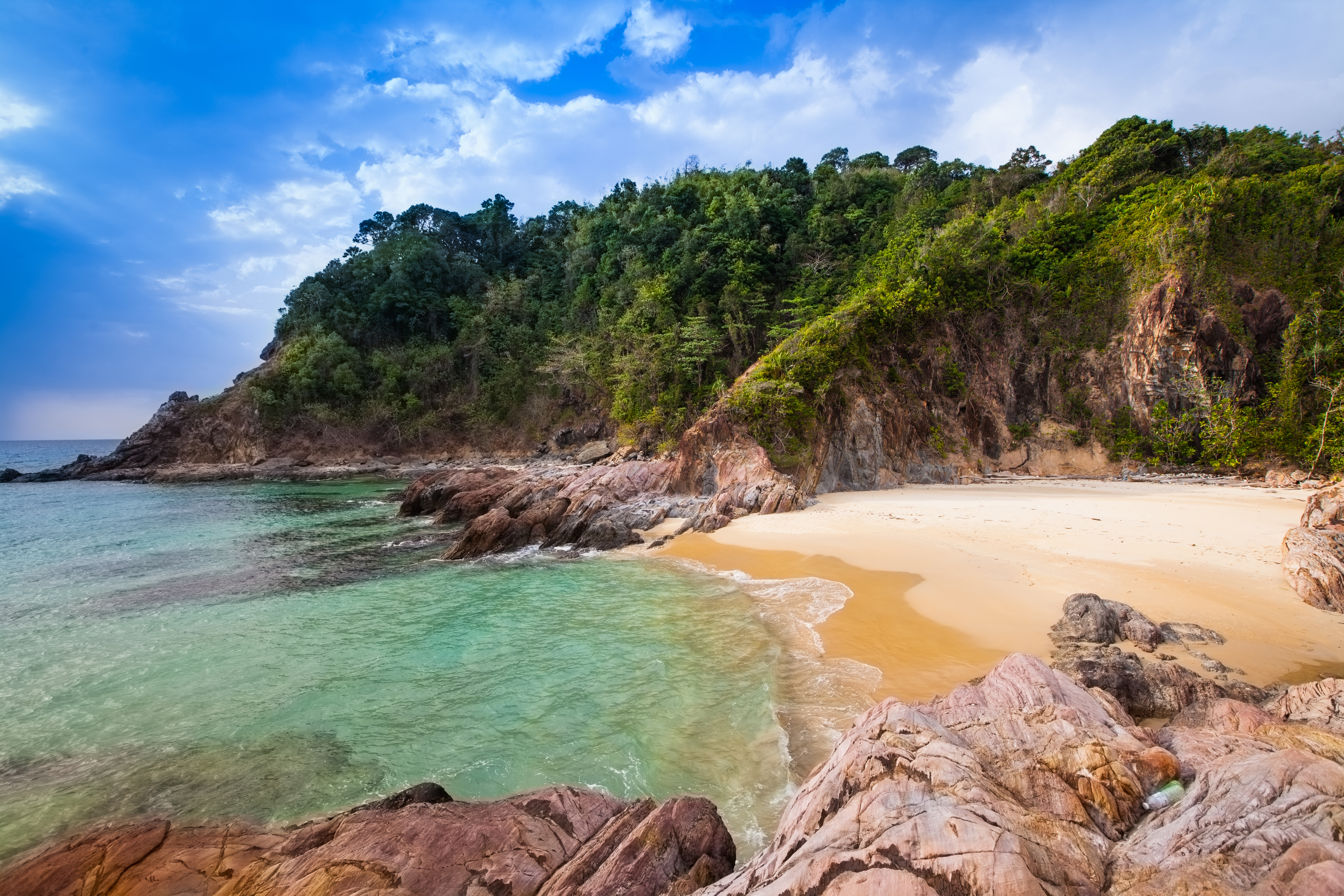
Khao Lampi–Hat Thai Mueang National Park

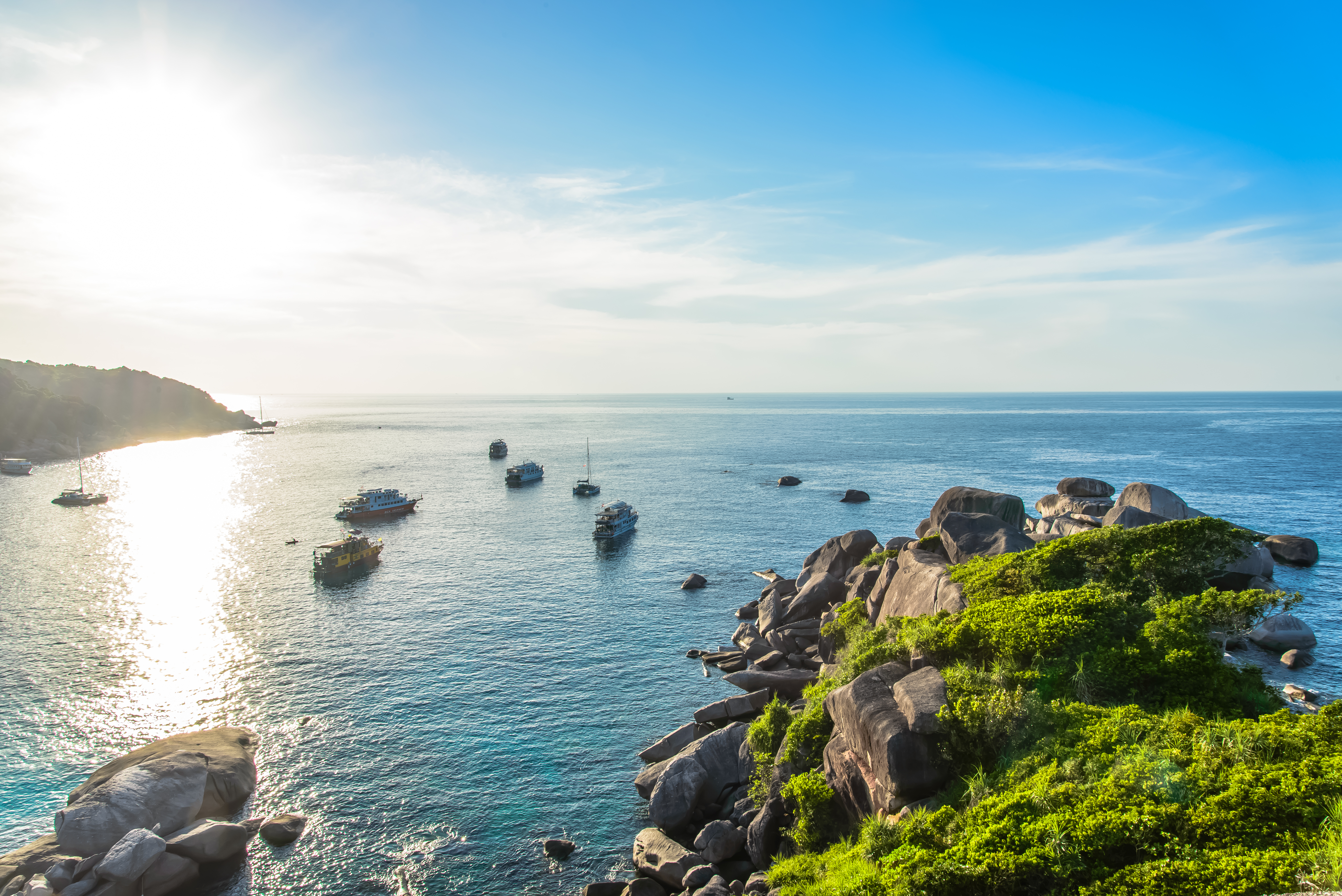
View from Similan Island to Andaman Sea

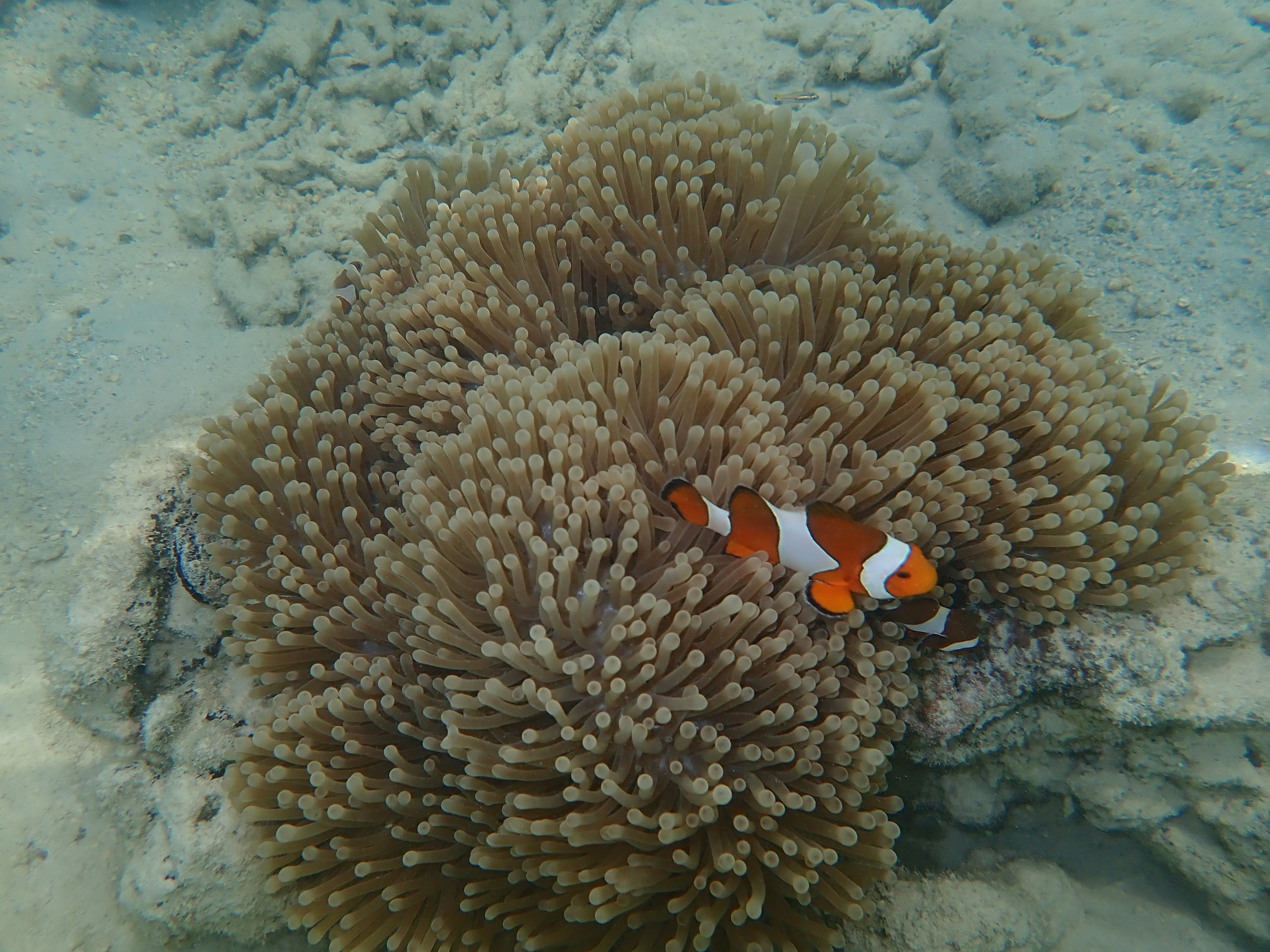
Mai-Ngam beach, Surin Islands National Park

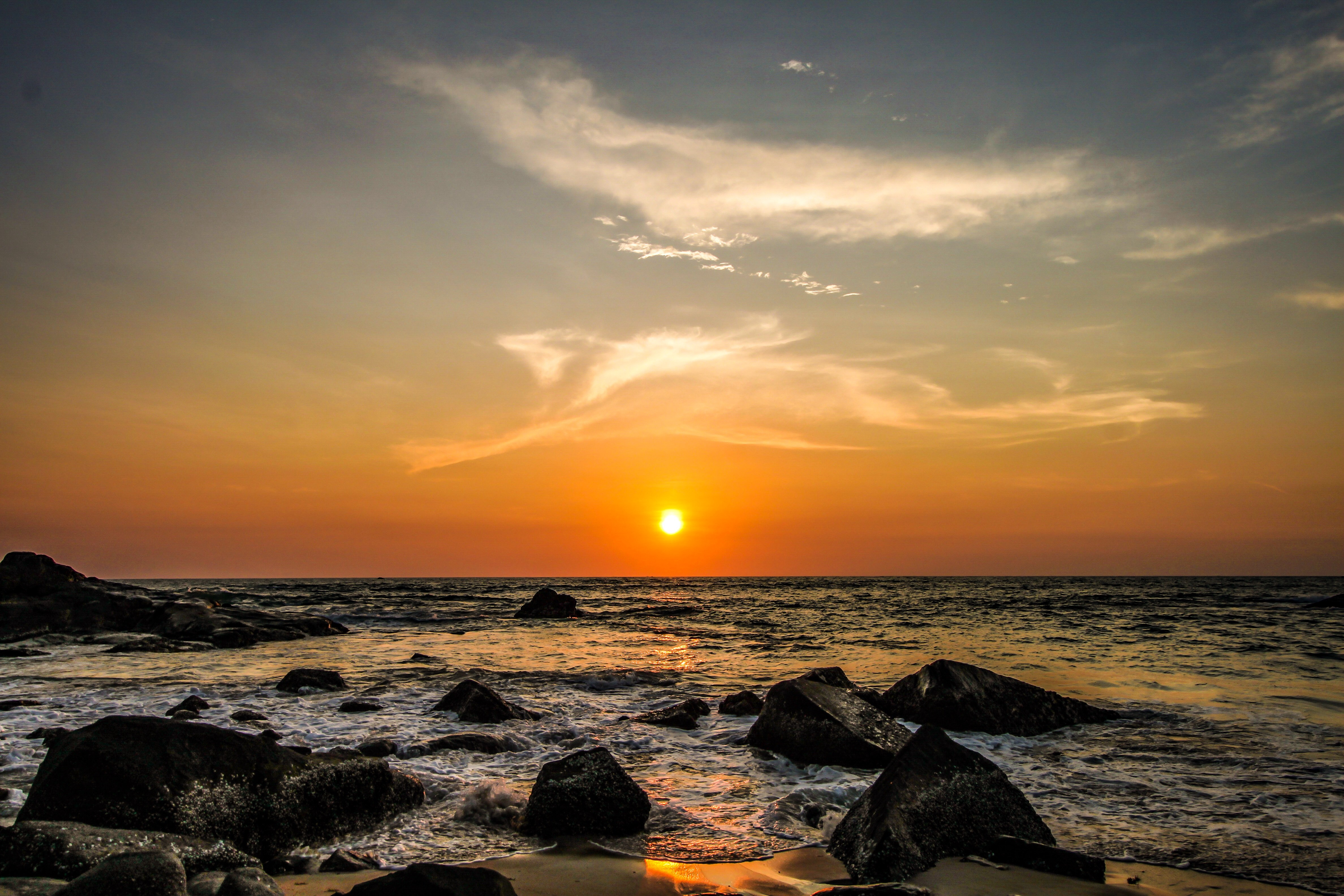
Khao Lak–Lam Ru National Park
