= Operation Unified Assistance =

US response to the 2004 Indian Ocean tsunami

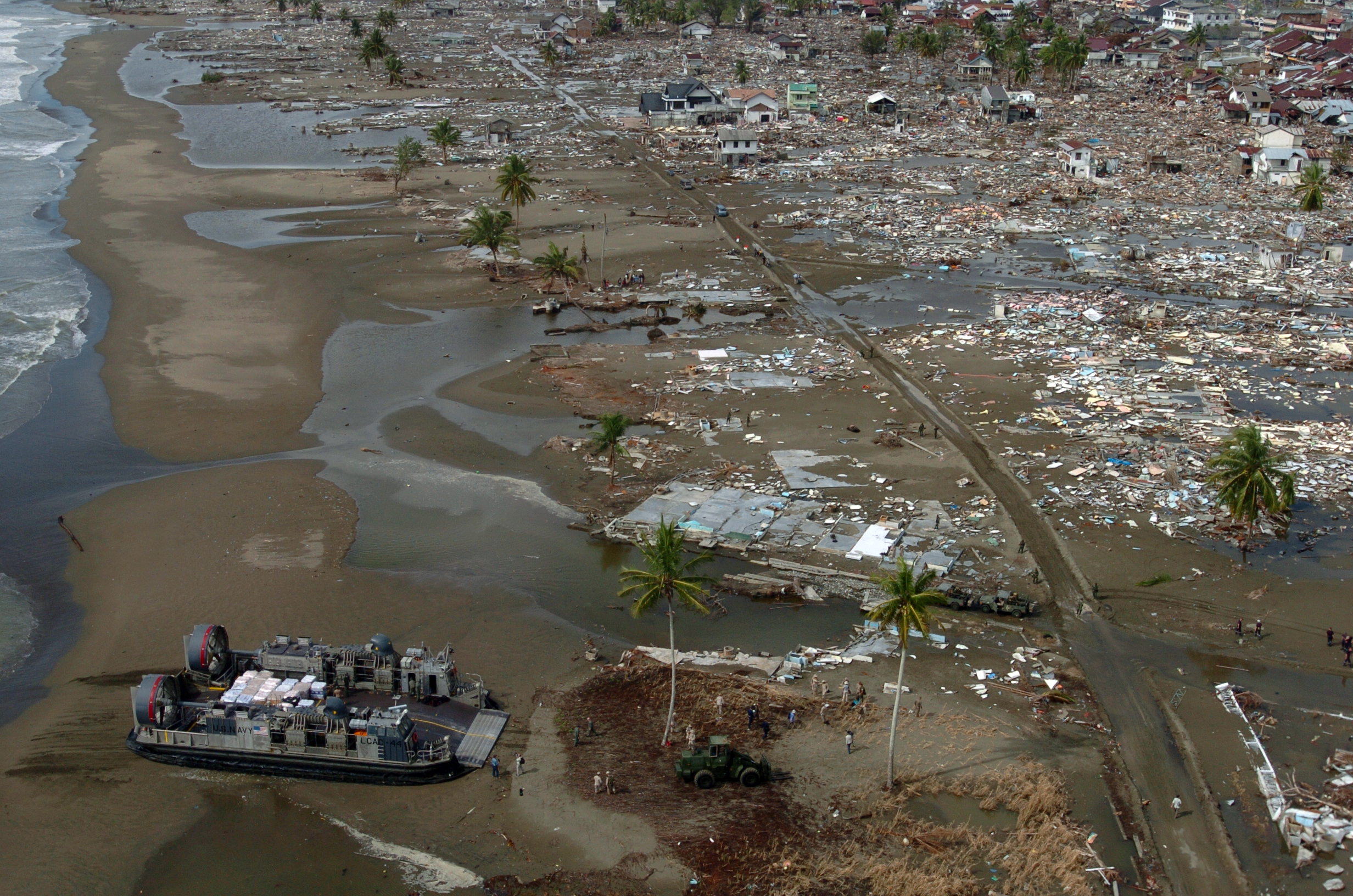
LCAC from the Bonhomme Richard delivering supplies to Meulaboh, Indonesia

Operation Unified Assistance was the American military's humanitarian response to the 2004 Indian Ocean earthquake and tsunami. On 28 December 2004, elements of the Combined Support Force were deployed to U-Tapao International Airport in Thailand. More than 12,600 Department of Defense personnel were involved in the relief effort.

== Background ==
The United States dispatched numerous C-5 and C-17 strategic airlifters and 10 C-130 Hercules tactical airlifters containing disaster supplies, 9 P-3C Orion maritime patrol aircraft for search and rescue support, and several teams from the Department of State and the Department of Defense to coordinate additional assistance from U-Tapao Naval Air Base in Thailand.

Carrier Strike Group 9 was dispatched to the coast of Sumatra to provide support to the Indonesian province of Aceh. It was led by the Abraham Lincoln, with support from the Shiloh, Shoup, Benfold, and Rainier.

An Expeditionary Strike Group led by the amphibious assault ship Bonhomme Richard, scheduled for a port call in Guam, was dispatched to render assistance. A total of 48 Navy and Marine Corps helicopters were involved. Each ship could produce around 90,000 US gallons of fresh water per day. Other ships in the group were amphibious transport dock Duluth, the guided-missile destroyer Milius, the dock landing ship Rushmore, the guided-missile frigate Thach, the nuclear-powered submarine Pasadena, guided-missile cruiser Bunker Hill, and the coast guard cutter Douglas Munro.

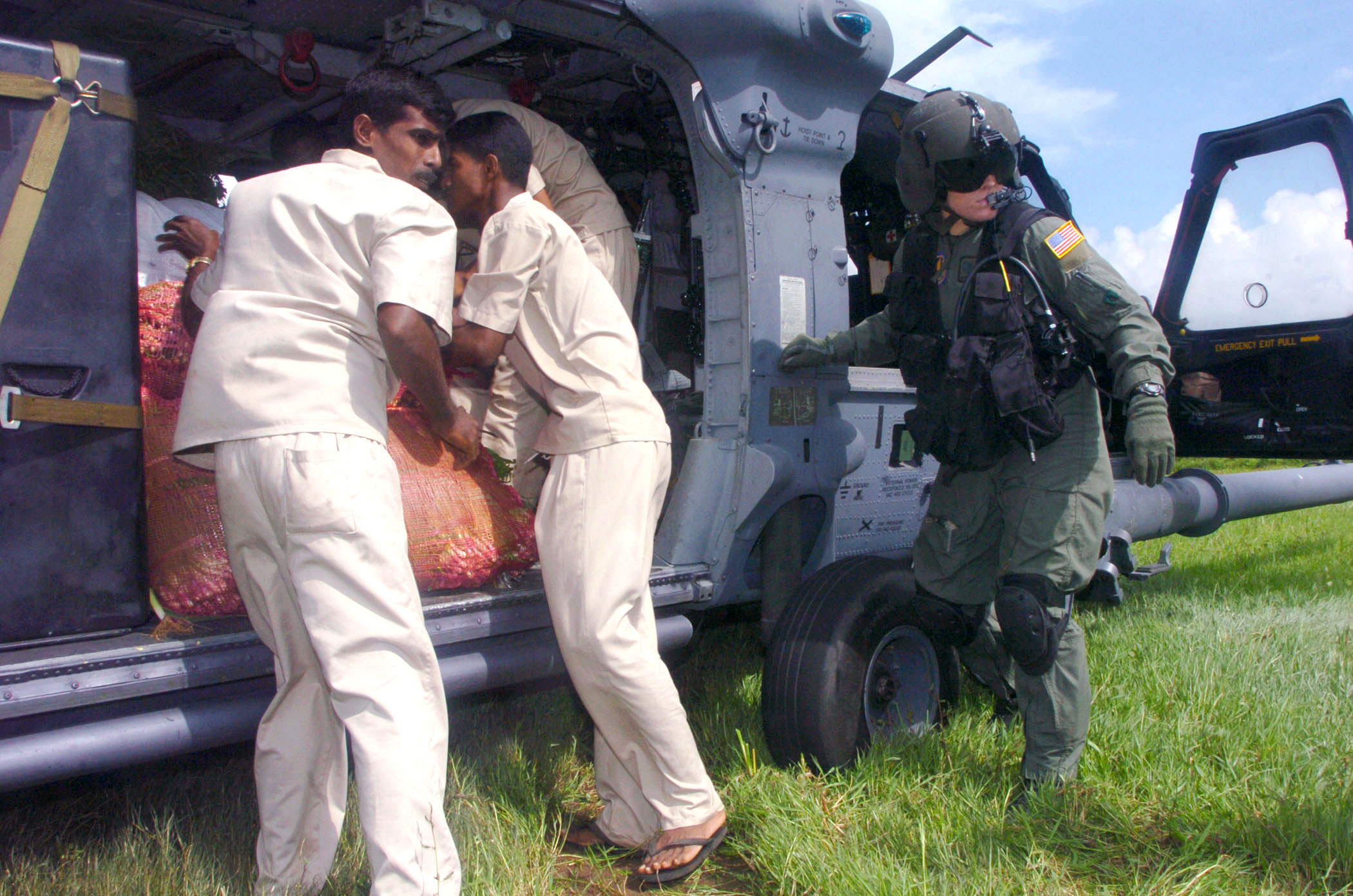
Sri Lankan relief workers unload vegetables

The US Navy also deployed the Mercy, a 1,000-bed hospital ship (initially staffed to support 250 patient beds). Other logistics ships were also employed such as the combat stores ships San Jose and Niagara Falls.

In January 2005, 24 Navy ships and one Coast Guard vessel were in the area. Among those ships was the amphibious assault ship USS Fort McHenry (LSD-43), USS Essex (LHD-2) which relieved the Bonhomme Richard, and assumed the duties as the primary rotary wing platform for the operation. USS Essex (LHD-2) also brought helicopter detachments. The last ship, USS Mercy, departed the region in April 2005.

Indonesian public opinion of the United States markedly improved in the year after the tsunami, jumping from 15% in 2003 to 38% in 2005, going against the general trend of less favorable attitudes towards America in that time period. Many Indonesians surveyed indicated that American relief efforts generally improved their view of the United States.

== Relief operations in Thailand ==
U.S. military relief operations in Thailand were coordinated primarily through U-Tapao Royal Thai Navy Airfield, which served as the regional hub for Operation Unified Assistance. In hard-hit areas of Phang Nga Province, including Khao Lak, Takua Pa, and Ban Nam Khem, U.S. Navy and Marine Corps personnel supported Thai authorities with aerial reconnaissance, logistics, search and rescue, and emergency medical support. Helicopter detachments from amphibious assault ships such as the USS Bonhomme Richard and USS Essex transported relief supplies to remote areas and helped evacuate the injured. U.S. forces also assisted in the early stages of disaster victim identification (DVI) efforts alongside Thai and international forensic teams.

== See also ==
- Operation Unified Response, for the 2010 Haiti earthquake
- Operation United Assistance, for the 2014 Ebola virus epidemic in West Africa
