= Kapong district =

District of Thailand

Kapong กะปง
- District
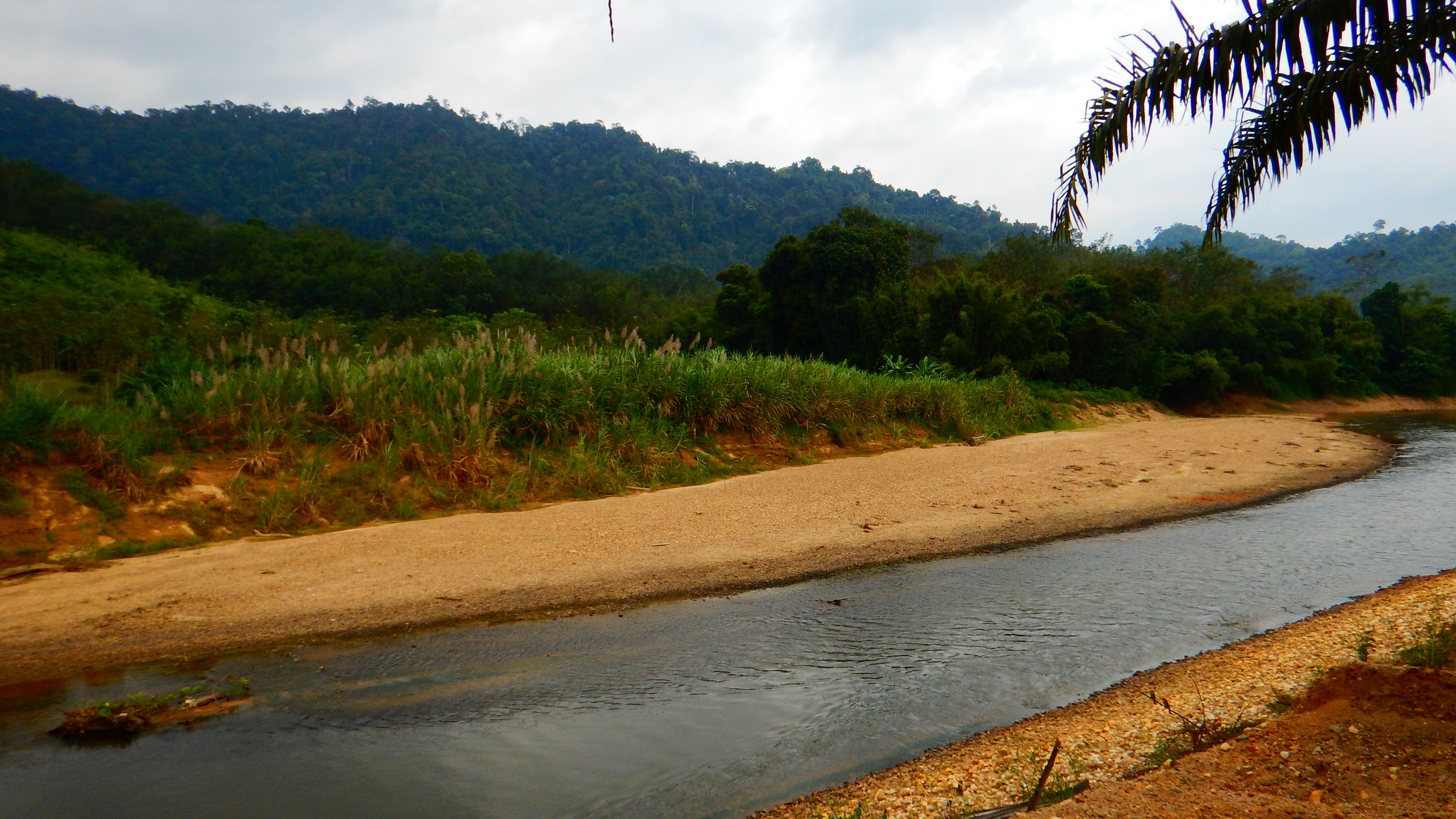
- Rommani Sub-district, Kapong District, December 2014

- District location in Phang Nga province
- Coordinates: 8°41′48″N 98°24′30″E
- Country: Thailand
- Province: Phang Nga
- Seat: Tha Na

Area
  - Total: 588.793 km^{2} (227.334 sq mi)

Population (2005)
  - Total: 12,963
  - Density: 22/km^{2} (57/sq mi)
- Time zone: UTC+7 (ICT)
- Postal code: 82170
- Geocode: 8203

Kapong (Thai: กะปง, pronounced [kā.pōŋ]) is a district (amphoe) in Phang Nga province in south Thailand.

== Geography ==
The district is surrounded by several neighboring districts, with Phanom of Surat Thani province to the north, and moving clockwise, Mueang Phang Nga, Thai Mueang, and Takua Pa.

A significant portion of the district's forested area forms part of the Khao Lak-Lam Ru National Park, known for its diverse ecosystems and natural beauty.

Within the district, particularly in the Le Subdistrict, is the highest geographical point, Phu Ta Jo. This peak is signposted with an elevation of approximately 1,300 meters. Historically, the summit and its slopes were utilized for tin mining operations, which have since ceased operations several decades ago.

== History ==
The district derives its name from Khlong Kapong, a natural canal that traverses the region. The canal and its surrounding areas retain much of their natural characteristics, with sections encompassing both forested and cultivated land.

Historically, Kapong was an integral part of Takua Pa or Takola. In earlier times, it served as a trading post, frequented by Indian traders, indicating its significance in regional commerce. The discovery of mineral deposits in the area marked a significant shift in its economic landscape. This development led to an increase in the district's prominence and economic activity, culminating in its elevation to the status of a full district during the years 1896–1897.

== Administration ==
Kapong district is divided into five sub-districts (tambons), which are further subdivided into 22 villages (mubans). Tha Na has township (thesaban tambon) status and covers parts of tambon Tha Na. There are four tambon administrative organizations (TAO). Tambon Kapong is administered by a neighboring tambon.

No.	Name	Thai name	Villages	Pop.
1.	Kapong	กะปง	4	1,785
2.	Mo	เหมาะ	4	2,311
3.	Tha Na	ท่านา	4	3,819
4.	Le	เหล	6	2,579
5.	Rommani	รมณีย์	4	2,469

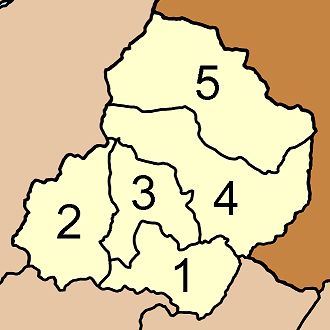

== Places ==
- Pracha Uthit Bridge: a bridge over Khlong Kapong, a landmark of Kapong.

== In literature and film ==
The district is the setting for the semi-autobiographical short stories of Ajin Panjapan about the four years, from 1949–1953, he worked there on a tin mining dredge. The stories were converted to film in the 2005 Thai movie, The Tin Mine (Maha'lai muang rae), directed by Jira Maligool.
