= Effect of the 2004 Indian Ocean earthquake on Thailand =

Map showing the provinces of Thailand affected

Thailand was one of the 18 countries greatly impacted by the 2004 Indian Ocean earthquake and tsunami on 26 December 2004. The 2004 Indian Ocean earthquake and tsunami left behind unprecedented damage and destruction in six provinces of Thailand, impacting 407 villages, and completely destroying 47 of them, including prominent tourist resorts like Khao Lak. The disaster killed about 5,400 people in Thailand, including foreign tourists. In addition, 2,993 people were reported missing in Thailand. According to reports, over 250,000 people were killed within 18 countries across Southeast Asia and Southern Africa that were impacted, and over 1.7 million people were left homeless. The 2004 Indian Ocean earthquake and tsunami was a significant disaster event that impacted a vast population.

== Tsunami ==
The tsunami was caused by a 9.0 magnitude earthquake located in Indonesia in the early morning of 26 December 2004. The first location where the tsunami was noticed was on the Similan Islands, a famous diving site located about 70 km from Phang Nga town in Pha Nga province, 13 km from central Khao Lak. When the tsunami struck, the sea around these islands was reported to have strong currents and underwater divers felt strong turbulence. Some flooding also occurred inland, though no casualties were reported.

When the tsunami struck Thailand, it first hit the southern coastlines of Thailand called the Andaman coast. Almost all the major beaches on the Andaman coast suffered substantial damage, and all six of the coastal provinces along the Andaman Coast were obliterated. Phang Nga was the province that was most destroyed, since 4,224 individuals died---more than half being tourists---along with resorts and communities along the island's southern shores being damaged completely. An area of Phang Nga that was most severely devastated was Khao Lak, which is one of the most prominent resort areas in all of Thailand.

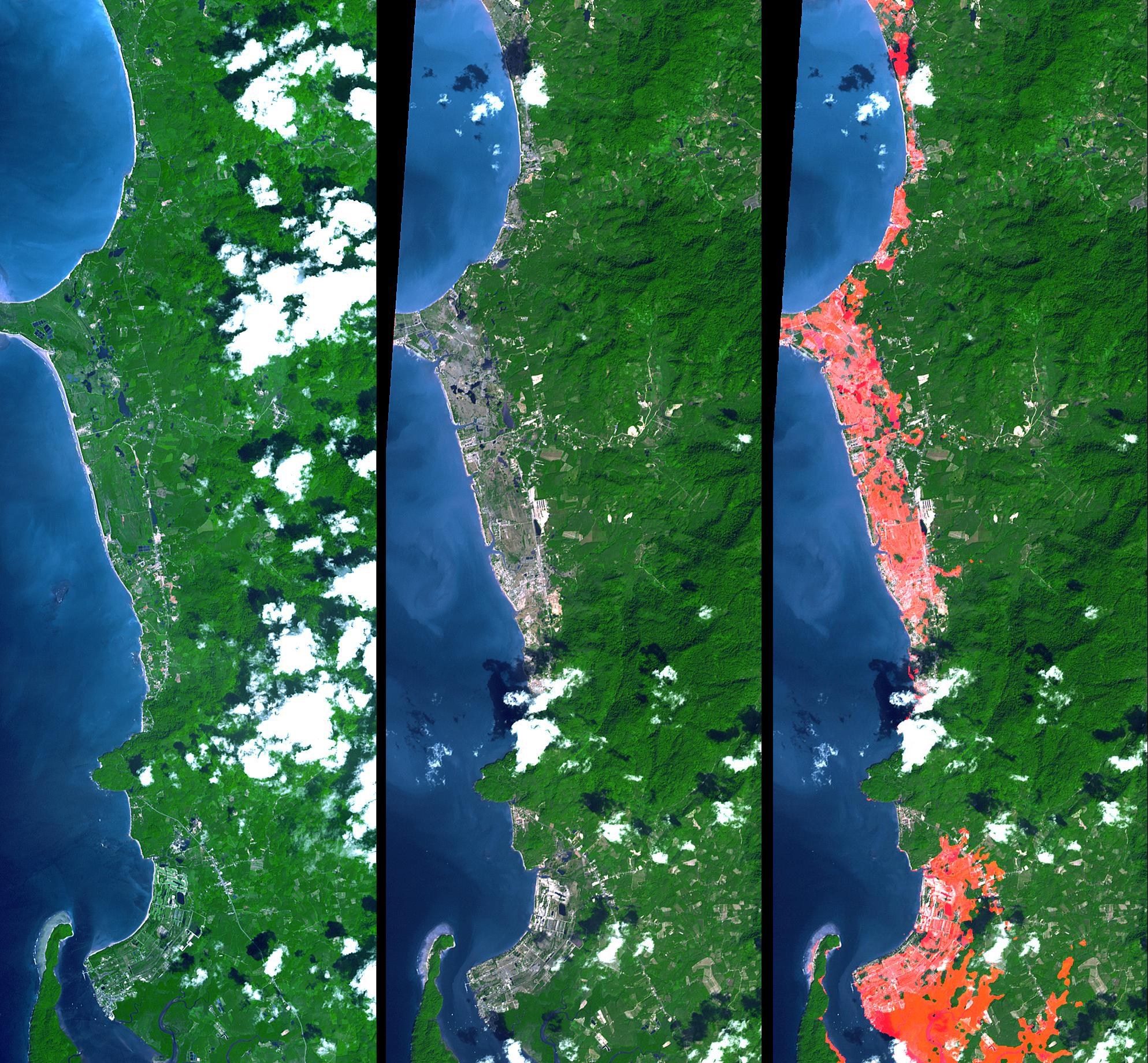
Tsunami inundation at Khao Lak; the resort area is in the middle

The majority of Khao Lak's coastal landscape was destroyed by the tsunami, and in response, some replanting programs have been initiated and a great deal has been accomplished in the rejuvenation of surrounding foliage. Studies suggesting that coastal vegetation may have helped buffer the effects of the waves have ensured that replanting and maintenance of the coastal vegetation have become a priority in the reconstruction of the landscape. Khao Lak experienced the highest run-up of any tsunami wave height of any location aside from Sumatra. Due to the topography of the seabed, coastline and reefs offshore, the tsunami waves piled on top of themselves and in doing so, create the infamous 'disappearing sea effect' which enticed many tourists to their deaths. This effect is also known as the tsunami drawback.

The 2012 film The Impossible is based on the true story of the family of María Belón, who survived the 2004 tsunami, and was also based in Khao Lak. In The Impossible, the Belón family suffered an array of obstacles throughout the tsunami, and the film accurately portrays the disaster events, as they occurred in real time.

The 2004 Indian Ocean Tsunami most notably caused a humanitarian toll, economic toll, and caused environmental and medical threats such as water pollution, flooding and diseases throughout all 18 countries it impacted. The impacts of this tsunami lasted for many years to come, and Thai residents and tourists visiting Thailand dealt with these severe consequences.

== Impact ==
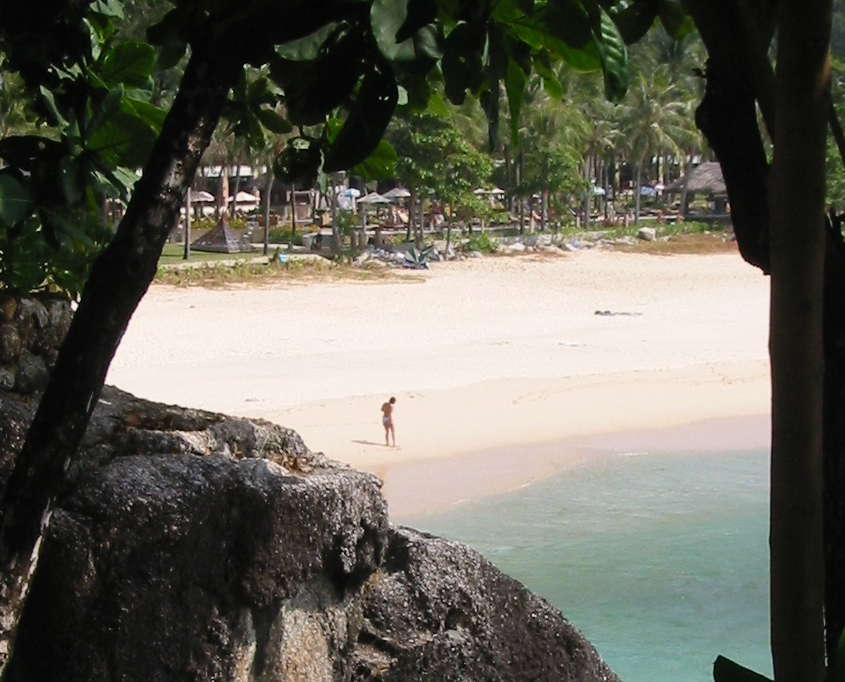
Regular sea level at Kata Noi beach.

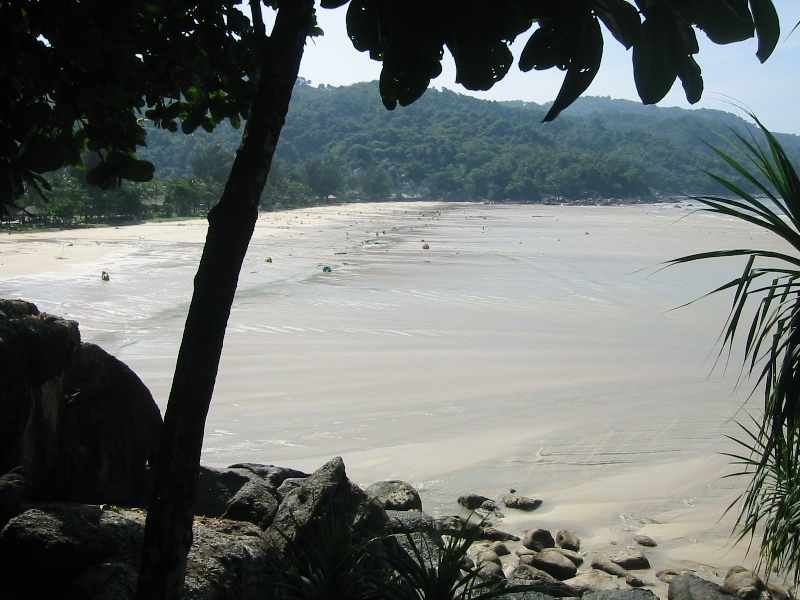
Maximum recession of the sea at Kata Noi Beach at 10:25 a.m., prior to the third—and strongest—tsunami wave

The economic impact of the tsunami on Thailand was considerable, though not as great as in poorer countries such as Indonesia or Sri Lanka. Thailand has a liberalized, flexible and robust economy, which has shown powers of rapid recuperation after previous setbacks.. The sectors most badly damaged were tourism and fishing. The beach resorts along the Andaman Sea coast were extensively damaged, and many Thai-owned hotels and other small businesses were ruined. Internationally, around $13.6 billion in private donations and other aid was donated to enable the recovery of the impacted countries and their economies

Infrastructure in general was, predictably, severely damaged, though much has been gleaned from surveying the aftermath. Reinforced concrete power poles are normally the standard in countries with high seismic risk. Addition of the tsunami's waves and associated debris demonstrated their weakness to shearing at the base. There were revelations about the height of these poles, too – the (up to) 10 meter waves submerged the shorter, older poles. And high-density polyethylene piping was found to perform exceptionally well: as roads crumbled, the subterranean flexible pipelines formed new contours and rarely separated.

The confidence of European tourists in travelling to places such as Phuket also took some time to recover, which is one reason why Thailand strongly backed the installed tsunami warning system. Thousands of Thais dependent on tourism-related industries lost their jobs, not just in the south but also in the poorest part of Thailand, Isan in the north-east, where many workers in the tourism industry come from. By 12 January, some of the affected resorts in the south had re-opened, and the Thai government had begun an advertising campaign to bring visitors back to the area as quickly as possible, though everyone knew it would be quite a while before Thailand was in a state of normalcy, professionals guessed around ten years.

The fishing industry was damaged by the extensive destruction of fishing boats and tackle, which individual fishing families could not afford to replace, particularly since many lost their homes as well. According to one report, more than 500 fishing boats and ten trawlers were destroyed, as well as many piers and fish-processing facilities. Again, grants or loans from the government have been essential to enable the industry to re-equip itself.

A further problem was the public aversion in Thailand to eating locally caught fish, for fear that the fish have fed on human dead bodies which were swept out to sea by the tsunami. Thais found this possibility offensive both on health grounds and for religious reasons. Fish product distributors refused to buy fish and crustaceans from Andaman Sea ports, and preferred to buy from Gulf of Thailand ports or even from Malaysia or Vietnam, so that they could assure consumers that there was no possibility of such contamination. As a result, even those fishing families who were able to fish were unable to sell their catch. The Director-General of the World Health Organization, Dr Lee Jong-Wook, went on Thai television to say that he was eating fish every day.

Another economic impact that devastated the country of Thailand was the tourism industry. When the tsunami destroyed places such as Khao Lak, Shang Nga, and Phuket, beach resorts and other hotels were completely obliterated, and there was a drastic overall drop in visitors to Thailand. The tourism industry brings in a substantial amount of revenue for Thailand, as tourism has created many jobs for the people of Thailand. So, when this tsunami occurred, there was a significant amount of jobs lost in the industry, and also a 40% decrease of visitors to Thailand.

In the long run, the tsunami disaster brought considerable benefits to Thailand, especially the southern tourist areas. European governments have pledged large sums of money to rebuild infrastructure and to fund new schools an orphanages for the Thai communities affected, as a gesture of thanks for the assistance given to their citizens by the Thai people. The destruction of many second-rate structures along the beaches provided opportunities to rebuild popular tourist areas such as Patong Beach at Phuket in a more aesthetically and environmentally suitable way.

Thailand held legislative elections on 6 February 2005, and the tsunami disaster was drawn into the election campaign. Prime Minister Thaksin Shinawatra accused the former Democratic Party of Thailand government of Chuan Leekpai of ignoring warnings in 1998 of the possible risk of a tsunami affecting Thailand. His allegations were supported by the former head of the Meteorological Department, Smith Tumsaroch. Democratic Party politicians said that Smith has failed to produce any evidence for his warnings at the time, and accused Thaksin of politicizing the tsunami tragedy.

Since the 2004 tsunami, an early-warning system has been installed along the affected coastline. In April 2012, it received its most recent test following an earthquake off the coast of Sumatra. Audible warning sirens alerted the local population to the possibility of a tsunami roughly 2 hours before estimated landfall, allowing the populace to move to higher ground inland.

== Death toll ==
The popular tourist area of Phuket was greatly impacted since a large number of people were reported dead. In Phuket, around 250 individuals, including foreign tourists, were reported deceased. Notably, the Takua Pa District in Phang Nga province, north of Phuket, was among Thailand's most severely affected areas, with significant casualties, including a considerable number of Burmese laborers.

The resort area of Khao Lak around 80 km north of Phuket was hit far worse with 3,950 confirmed deaths. However, the death toll in Khao Lak may have exceeded 4,500. Khao Lak was the coastal area of Thailand hardest hit by the tsunami resulting from the 26 December 2004 Indian Ocean earthquake. The final death toll was over 4,000, with local unofficial estimates topping 10,000 due to the lack of accurate government censuses and the fact that much of the migrant Burmese population was not documented nor recognized as legal residents. The severity of the situation in Khao Lak is probably explained by the fact, that unlike the high-rise hotels of Phuket, the village of Khao Lak only had low built bungalows instead of high-rise concrete hotels. Khao Lak also has an extensive area of flatland only a few meters above the sea level, on which most bungalows were situated. Bhumi Jensen, grandson of Thailand's King Bhumibol was among those killed in Khao Lak.

Just north of the Khao Lak area, the village of Ban Nam Khem was the worst affected in terms of devastation to the local population, with around 25% of its population of 4,200 lost to the tsunami and 80 percent of homes destroyed.

The force of the tsunami beached Thai navy boat 813 (Tor 813) almost 1.25 kilometres (0.78 miles) inland from Bang Niang Beach. It was on patrol, guarding Bhumi Jensen, a grandson of the king, as he was jet skiing in front of La Flora Resort. Despite rescue efforts, he could not be saved. His mother, Princess Ubol Ratana, and sister survived by fleeing to an upper story of La Flora. The area in which the patrol boat lies has been renovated and includes a museum dedicated to the events of 26 December.

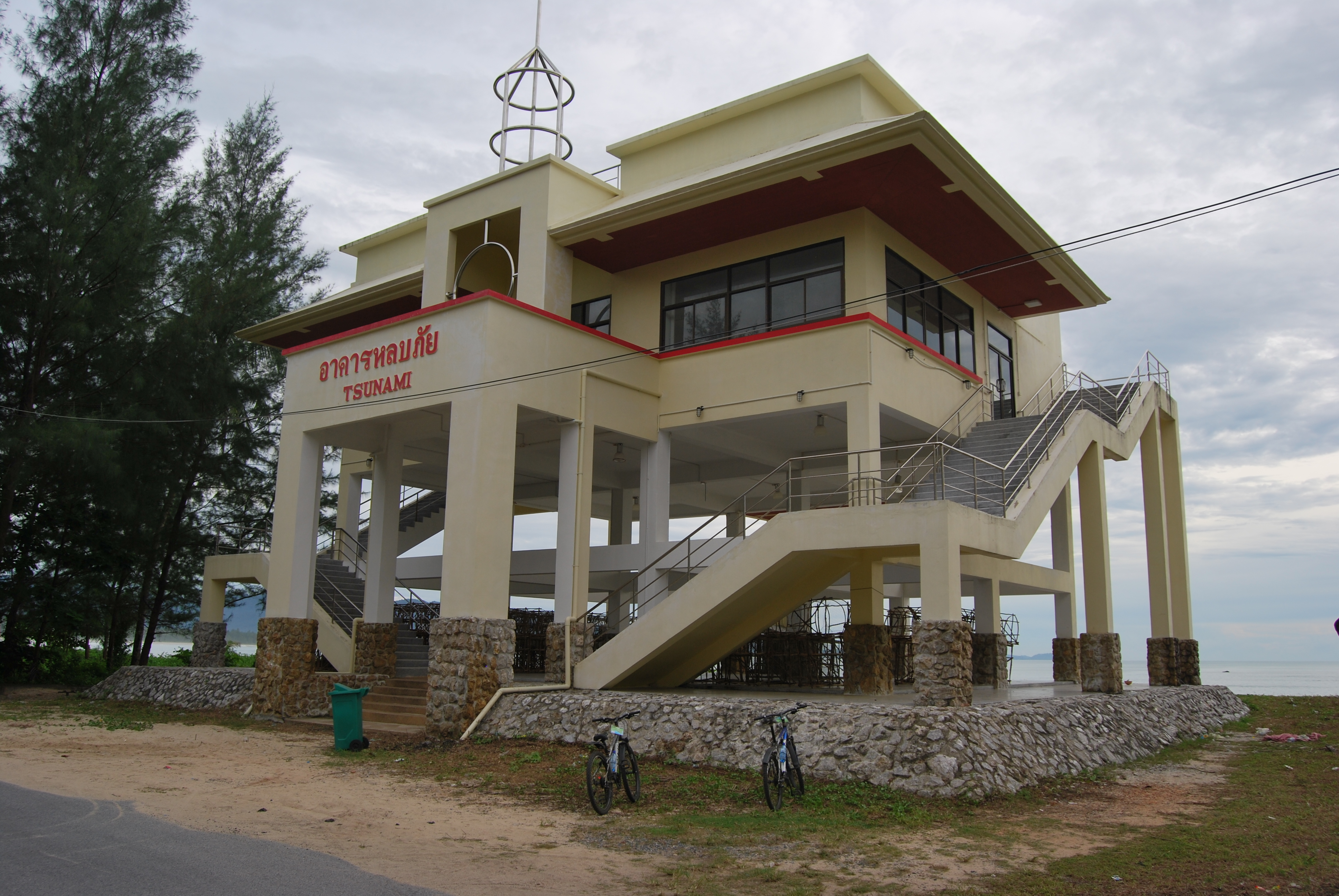
Shelter built following the 2004 tsunami.

Others among the casualties were well-known Finnish musician and TV host Aki Sirkesalo and his family, and Imre von Polgar, guitarist for the Swedish rock band, The Watermelon Men. Almost four years old at the time, a young girl was swept away at Khao Lak and remained the subject of a media-covered intensive search despite being formally identified in August 2005 as a victim. Jane Holland (née Attenborough) the elder daughter of the film director and actor Richard Attenborough perished in the tsunami with several members of her family. Former President of Finland Sauli Niinistö and his adult son survived by clinging to a power pole.

Official figures as of 7 January 2005
Province	Thai deaths	Foreign deaths	Total deaths	Thai injured	Foreign injured	Total injured	Missing
Krabi	288	188	476	808	568	1,376	890
Phang Nga	1,950	2,213	4,163	4,344	1,253	5,597	2,113
Phuket	154	105	259	591	520	1,111	700
Ranong	167	2	169	215	31	246	12
Satun	6	0	6	15	0	15	0
Trang	3	2	5	92	20	112	1
Total	2,568	2,510	5,078	6,065	2,392	8,457	3,716

Source: Bangkok Post. The "total deaths" and "total injured" categories include dead and injured persons whose nationality is not given or has not been established. The number of "foreign injured" has been reduced by evacuations of foreign nationals. Thai sources acknowledge that the great majority of those listed as "missing" are in fact dead, and that a large majority of these are foreigners.

An article in the Bangkok Post on 10 January suggested that some of the figures in this table may be seriously misleading. According to this article, the estimated number of deaths among Thai nationals has been reduced from about 2,500 to about 1,800, and the estimated number of deaths among foreigners has been reduced from 2,500 to 1,300. The number of deaths whose nationality has not been established has risen correspondingly, from less than 200 to about 2,100. This is due to increasing doubts about the reliability of the classification on the basis of visual identification of badly decomposed bodies into "Thai" and "foreign" categories. All bodies of unknown origin will now be DNA tested to determine their ethnic origin.

== Lessons Learned from The 2004 Indian Ocean earthquake and tsunami ==
Though the 2004 Indian Ocean earthquake and tsunami impacted millions of people in a wide variety of countries in Southeast Asia and Southern Africa, the impacts caused by the tsunami that occurred in Thailand results in many realizations made by Thai individuals, and government officials. Those in Thailand realized that in order to limit the impacts that a potential future tsunami may have, they must take certain actions including creating programs and warning systems. In particular, the country and surrounding countries organized three goals including the development of disaster tsunami program on national, state, and local levels, the development of an early warning system, and the creation of tsunami research programs for the future.

In 2006, Madagascar developed a national level plan for responding to potential tsunamis, where they planned to develop a national evacuation plan, create a national early warning system, increase tsunami awareness, and prepare individuals. After the tsunami, regional officials met to discuss the importance of creating warning and mitigation systems to focus on managing potential disasters and ensuring prevention, mitigation, response, and relief. Additionally, these local officials discussed the necessary steps to take to develop early warning systems for all countries near and around the Indian Ocean.

In Southern Thailand specifically, officials took efforts to emphasize mitigation and preparedness in the case of future disaster events. To mitigate, individuals in Southern Thailand analyzed their vulnerability by assessing their risk, along with rehabilitating coral reefs and sea grass beds. To prepare for future tsunami events, actions taken included the development of education programs, the creation of warning systems, the implementation of evacuation drills, and the conduction of disaster research. The actions taken by those living in Thailand, and the government officials within Thailand, were substantial.
