= Mekhong Full Moon Party =

2002 film

- The Thai movie poster.
- Directed by: Jira Maligool
- Written by: Jira Maligool
- Produced by: Yongyoot Thongkongtoon; Prasert Vivattanananpong
- Starring: Anuchyd Sapanphong; Noppadol Duangporn
- Cinematography: Somboon Piriyapukdeekul
- Edited by: Pan Busabaan
- Music by: Amornbhong Methakunavudh
- Production companies: Bangkok Broadcasting Television; GMM Pictures; Hub Ho Hin Films
- Distributed by: GMM Pictures
- Release dates: October 2, 2002 (Canada); October 11, 2002 (Thailand)
- Running time: 119 minutes
- Country: Thailand
- Languages: Thai; Isan

Mekhong Full Moon Party (Thai: ๑๕ ค่ำ เดือน ๑๑; RTGS: Sip Ha Kham Duean Sip Et; literally, "The 15th Day of the 11th Month") is a 2002 Thai comedy-drama film about the Naga fireballs that arise from the Mekong at Nong Khai on the full moon in October. Written by Jira Maligool, the film was also Jira's directorial debut.

The film takes a semi-documentary approach to its subject, examining the phenomenon and its accompanying festival, which draws thousands of people to Nong Khai each year, as well as providing a glimpse at Isan culture, Thai folklore and such practices as eating insects.

== Plot ==
Khan, a Nong Khai native now attending university in Bangkok comes home for the annual Naga fireballs festival, just as a debate is raging over the cause of the fireballs. A local physician, Dr. Nortai, believes there is a scientific explanation for the phenomenon. A university professor, Dr. Suraphol, thinks the fireballs are manmade and are a hoax.

Khan knows the truth: Having grown up as a dek wat at a Buddhist temple across the river in Laos, he helped the temple's abbot and the monks there to create fireballs and plant them on the bed on the Mekong. It is how he grew up to become such a strong swimmer and obtain an athletic scholarship.

The temple's abbot, Luang Poh Loh, seeks Khan out and begs him to once again help with the planting of the fireballs. But Khan, weary of perpetuating a myth and of the crowds that accompany it, refuses.

This sets up a conflict between science and religion that threatens to change the annual celebration.

For his part, Luang Poh Loh is philosophical, advising "Do what you believe, believe in what you do."

== Cast ==
- Anuchyd Sapanphong as Khan
- Noppadol Duangporn as Luang Por Loh
- Boonchai Limathibul as Dr. Norati
- Somlek Sakdikul as Dr. Surapol
- Thidarat Chareonchaichana as Teacher Alice
- Boonsri Yindee as Aunt Oong
- Surasee Patham as Headmaster
- Jonathan Morrill as Phelong

== Festivals and awards ==
The film won nine awards at the Thailand National Film Awards, including honors for best picture, best director and best screenplay for Jira Maligool and best actor to Noppadol Duangporn.

It won the International Federation of Film Critics award at the Hong Kong International Film Festival and was in the Association of Southeast Asian Nations competition at the 2003 Bangkok International Film Festival.

The film had its world premiere at the Vancouver International Film Festival and was screened at many other festivals including the Seattle International Film Festival and the Stockholm International Film Festival.
