= Mingmongkol Sonakul =

Thai film producer and director

Mom Luang Mingmongkol Sonakul
- มิ่งมงคล โสณกุล
- Born: 5 September 1971 (age 54); Bangkok, Thailand
- Occupations: Film producer; film director
- Years active: 1998–present
- Notable work: The Tin Mine (2005); Alone (2007)

Mom Luang Mingmongkol Sonakul (Thai: มิ่งมงคล โสณกุล; RTGS: Mingmongkhon Sonakun, born 1971 in Bangkok, Thailand) is a Thai film producer and independent film director. As the head of her own production company, Dedicate Ltd., she has produced films by Apichatpong Weerasethakul (Mysterious Object at Noon); Pen-Ek Ratanaruang, including Invisible Waves; Pimpaka Towira's One Night Husband and The Tin Mine by Jira Maligool.

== Biography ==
=== Education and career ===
Mingmongkol is the daughter of Chatumongol Sonakul. She studied film at the San Francisco Art Institute. She then served as an intern at the Museum of Modern Art in New York before returning to Thailand.

As a director, her films tend towards experimentalism. Her first feature film, I-San Special, featured the audio from a radio soap opera set in a luxury resort hotel, played out by passengers on a rickety bus heading from Bangkok to Isan.

Her 2005 feature, 3 Friends, co-directed with Aditya Assarat and Pum Chinaradee, and starring Napakpapha Nakprasitte, is a blend of the "movie star exploitation" VCDs and unscripted reality television series, showing the bikini-clad actress taking a beach vacation with two other friends.

== Filmography ==
=== As producer ===
- The River of Chao Phraya (1998)
- Mysterious Object at Noon (2000)
- I-San Special (2002)
- One Night Husband (2003)
- The Tin Mine (2005)
- 3 Friends (2005)
- Invisible Waves (2006)
- Twelve Twenty (2006)
- Alone (2007)

=== As director ===
- I-San Special (2002)
- 3 Friends (2005)
