= Metrosexual (film) =

- The Thai movie poster.
- Directed by: Yongyooth Thongkongtoon
- Written by: Aummaraporn Phandintong; Benjamaporn Srabua
- Produced by: Jira Maligool; Prasert Vivattanananpong; Yongyoot Thongkongtoon
- Starring: Thianchai Chaisawatdee; Meesuk Jaengmeesuk; Patcharasri Benjamas; Ornpreeya Hunsat; Pimolwan Suphayang; Kulnadda Pajchimsawat
- Cinematography: Somboon Piriyapukdeekul
- Edited by: Parn Busabun
- Music by: Mongkol Pongwachirin; Giant Wave
- Distributed by: GMM Tai Hub
- Release date: 13 July 2006
- Running time: 117 minutes
- Country: Thailand
- Language: Thai
- Budget: US$1.25 million
- Box office: 5 million baht

Metrosexual (Thai: แก๊งชะนีกับอีแอบ or Gaeng chanee gup ee-aep) is a 2006 Thai romantic comedy film about four women who believe their best friend is about to marry a man who is gay. The film was directed by Yongyooth Thongkongtoon, who also directed The Iron Ladies. The five female leads all co-host a daytime talk show on Thai TV Channel 3.

== Plot ==
Four friends each receive phone calls to meet a fifth friend for lunch at MK Restaurant, a popular hot pot chain in Bangkok. The friends are:

- Pom, a reporter for a women's magazine.
- Nim, a sexual dysfunction telephone-hotline counselor.
- Fai, the stingy owner of a beauty salon.
- Pat, the fiancée of a retired Japanese man.

They are called to the restaurant by Pang, who announces that she is planning to marry Kong, her boyfriend of three months. The four friends are surprised by the news and think maybe it is too sudden.

Then Kong joins the five women for their meal. His well-groomed appearance is met with approval, but when Kong starts offering tips on how to cook the meal, and presents a pair of earrings that he picked out to Pom for her birthday (the real reason the five girlfriends are getting together), eyebrows are raised.

The four women later meet at Fyne's beauty salon and voice their suspicions that Kong might be gay, and not just a metrosexual male. Pom reveals that she spotted Kong earlier at a male model beauty pageant she was covering, and she saw him embracing another man backstage. To confirm their belief, they need advice. So Pat arranges a meeting with her brother, Bee, who's a flight attendant for Thai Airways International. Bee puts together a checklist, which includes various physical attributes as well as biological and sociological backgrounds that could indicate whether a man is gay.

A series of comic scenarios then occur as the four women investigate Kong and watch for any telltale signs.

== Cast ==
- Thianchai Chaisawatdee as Kong
- Meesuk Jaengmeesuk as Pang
- Patcharasri Benjamas as Pom
- Ornpreeya Hunsat as Nim
- Pimolwan Suphayang as Fyne
- Kulnadda Pajchimsawat as Pat
- Michael Shaowanasai as Bee
- Dawido Dorigo as Off
- Yano Khasogi as Kengi
- Panisara Pimpru as the fortune teller

=== Casting notes ===
- Thai producer-director Jira Maligool has a cameo appearance as the portrait of the dead husband of a Bangkok Chinatown restaurant owner.
- Actor Yano Khasogi (or Kasuki) is a Bangkok-based Japanese mime artist.

== Reception ==
On opening day, the US$1.25 million film earned 5 million baht (about US$131,000).
