= 406th =

406th may refer to:

- 406th Air Expeditionary Group, the operational flying component of the 406th Air Expeditionary Wing
- 406th Air Expeditionary Wing, a provisional unit assigned to the United States Air Forces in Europe
- 406th Bombardment Squadron or 906th Air Refueling Squadron (906 ARS), part of the 375th Air Mobility Wing at Scott Air Force Base, Illinois
- 406th Support Brigade (United States), support brigade of the United States Army

== See also ==
- 406 (number)
- 406 (disambiguation)
- 406, the year 406 (CDVI) of the Julian calendar
- 406 BC
