= Phang-nga Naval Base =

Naval base in Thailand

Coordinates: 8°34.5′N 98°13.5′E

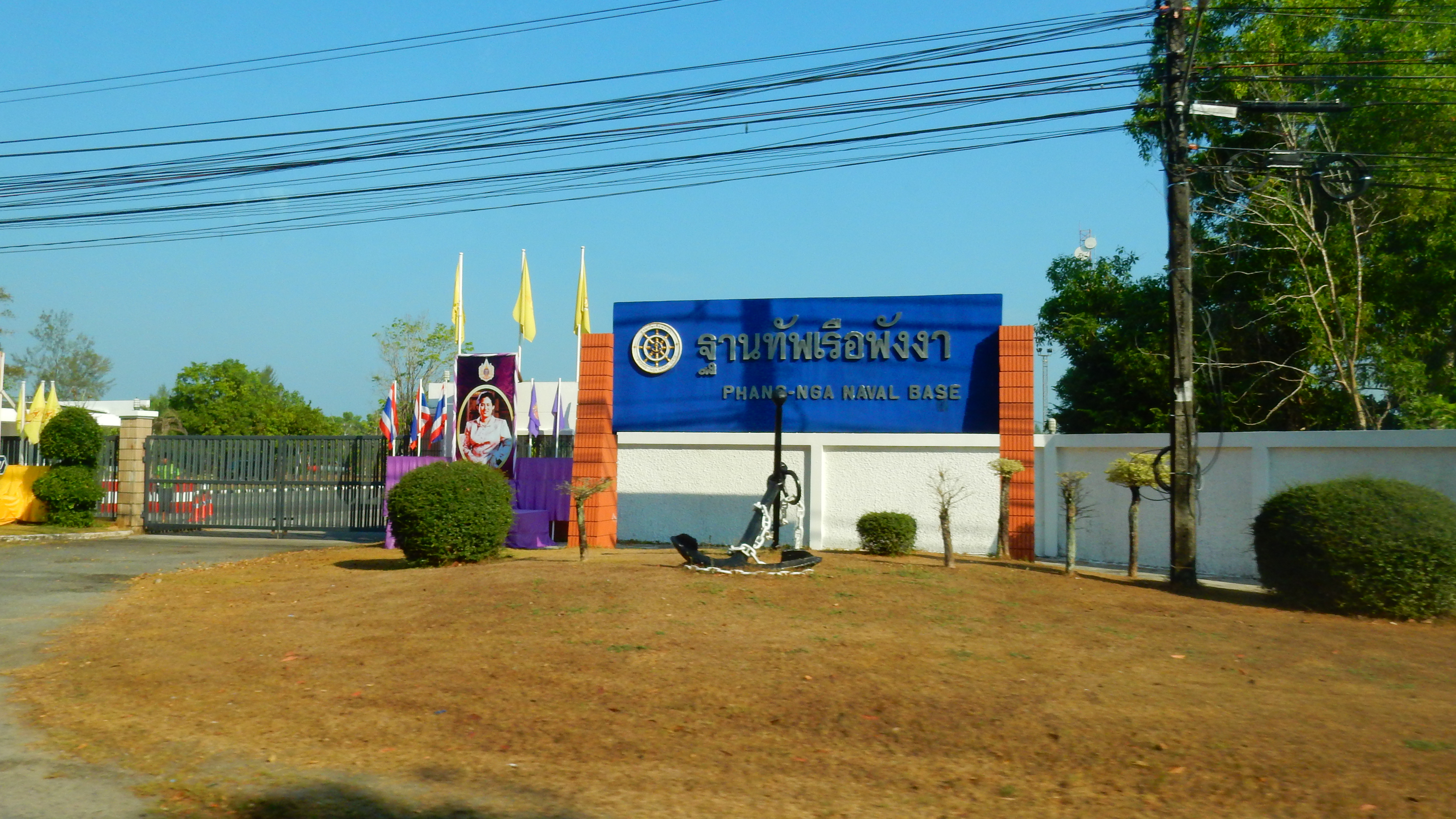

The Phang-nga Naval Base (Thai: ฐานทัพเรือพังงา, RTGS: Than Thap Ruea Phang-nga) is a base of the Royal Thai Navy, under the Third Naval Area Command. It sits on the Andaman Sea coast, in Thai Mueang district of Phang-nga province, just south of Khao Lak–Lam Ru National Park and the resort town of Khao Lak. It operates the Sea Turtle Conservation Center, which also serves as a tourist attraction.

In 2025, during the Trump tariff talks, rumours circulated that the United States was seeking to establish a naval presence at the Phang-nga Base.
