= 2013 Bangkok 12th district by-election =

Bangkok 12th district by-election, 2013
- 16 June 2013

Bangkok
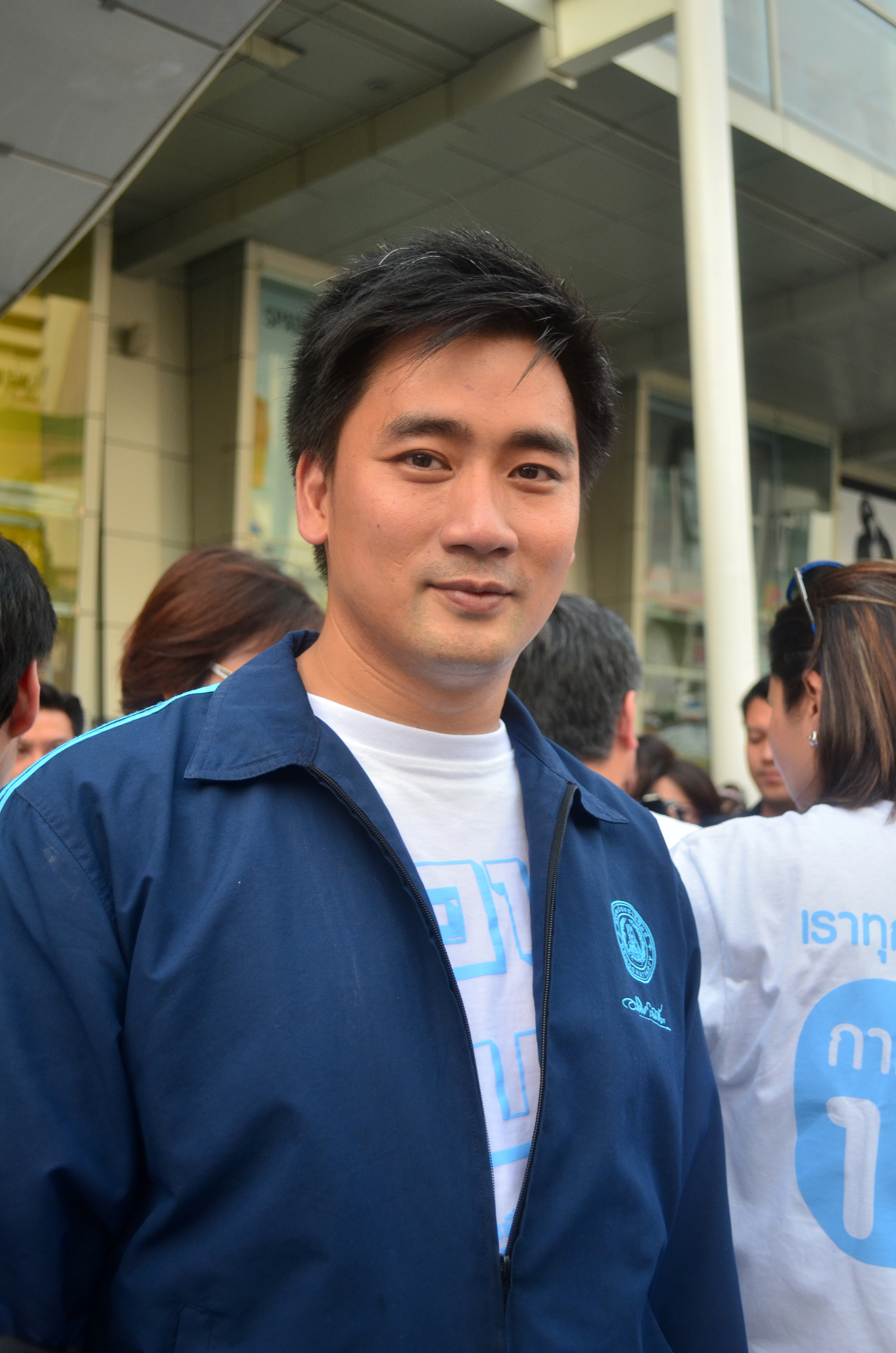
| | First party | Second party |
|---|---|---|
| Candidate | Tankhun Jitt-itsara | Yuranunt Pamornmontri |
| Party | Democrat | Pheu Thai |
| Last election | 30,675 | 38,351 |
| Popular vote | 31,566 (▲891) | 29,507 (▼8,844) |
| Percentage | 50.80% | 47.49% |

A by-election was held in the 12th district of Bangkok on 16 June 2013.

== Candidates ==
1. Bhuddhichad Chuyram Seri Tham Party Number 1
2. Pangsri Pijarn New Democracy Party (Thailand) Number 2
3. Weerapol Suthipornparangkoon Tuangkuenpeanpha Thailand Party Number 3
4. Phattanapong Kasemwan Energy Thai Party Number 4
5. Noppadol Chairitthidech Unity Nation Party Number 5
6. Thanawit Palakawong Na-Ayutthaya Puea Pandin Party Number 6
7. Witthaya Raksathip Palang Sahakorn Party Number 7
8. Tankhun Jitt-itsara Democrat Party (Thailand) Number 8
9. Yuranunt Pamornmontri Pheu Thai Party Number 9
