= 406 (disambiguation) =

406 was a year of the Julian calendar. 406 may also refer to:

- 406 (number)
- 406 MHz, the COMPASS distress frequency
- Area code 406 in Montana, United States
- HTTP 406, an error code
- Any of several highways; see List of highways numbered 406
- Peugeot 406, a French car

== See also ==
- 406th (disambiguation)
