= Ban Nam Khem =

Village in Thailand

Coordinates: 8°51′30″N 98°16′30″E

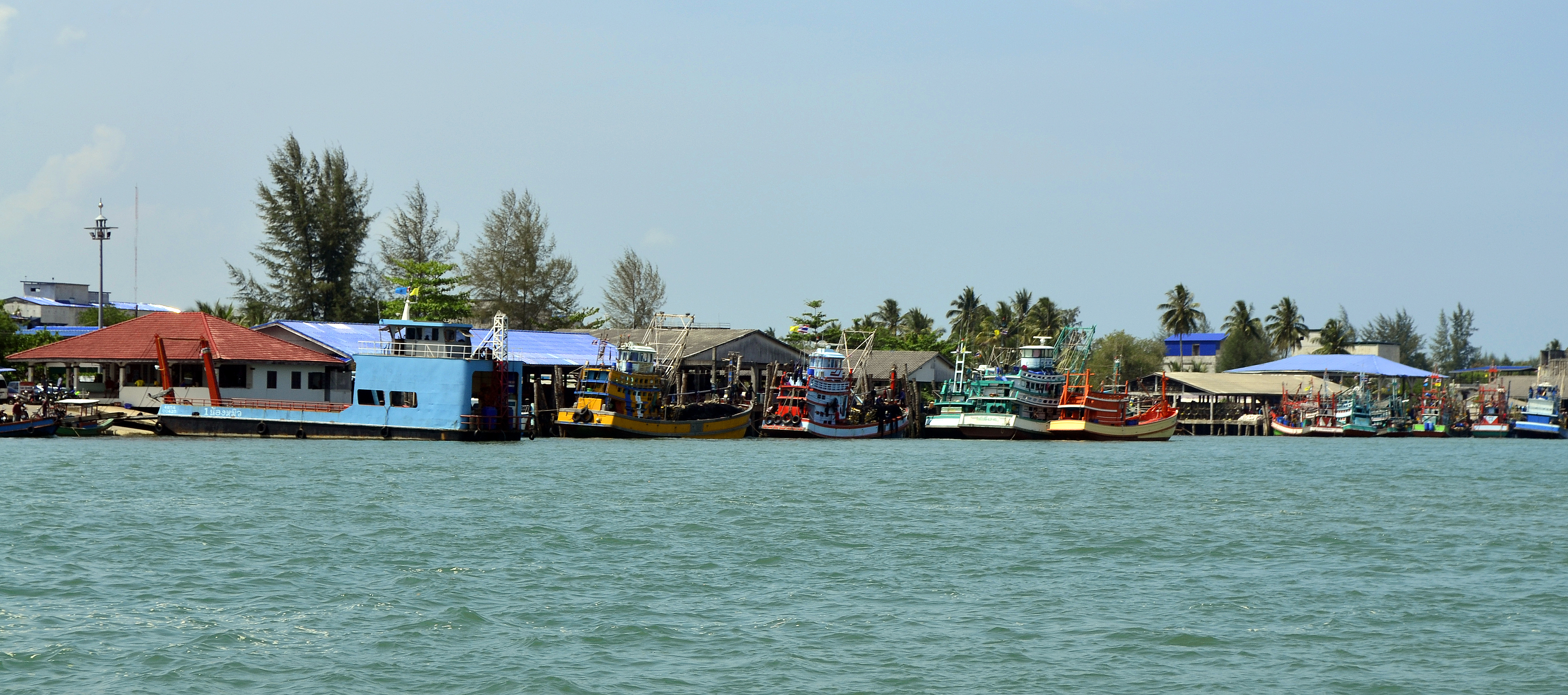
The waterfront at Ban Nam Khem Pier, 2013

Ban Nam Khem (Thai: บ้านน้ำเค็ม, also spelled Baan Nam Khem) is a village on the Andaman Sea coast of southern Thailand, located in Bang Muang Subdistrict, Takua Pa District, Phang Nga Province. It was one of Thailand's worst-affected areas in the 2004 Indian Ocean tsunami, which killed approximately a quarter of its 4,200 residents and destroyed 80 percent of its homes. Ban Nam Khem lies just north of Khao Lak, a coastal area that also suffered severe casualties during the tsunami and became a center for international recovery operations.

Ban Nam Khem was originally a small fishing community of around 30 households, until tin mining concessions granted in the area around 1972–1973 led to an economic boom which saw a rapid population growth. The industry collapsed in the late 1980s, and the village's economy reverted to fishing and related activities.

Following the tsunami, Ban Nam Khem became a major focal point of government rebuilding efforts and external aid. Early relief efforts in Ban Nam Khem were supported by both Thai authorities and international NGOs, including Médecins Sans Frontières, Save the Children, and the Thai Red Cross. The village also saw the development of a local civil society movement as the community self-organized to participate in future planning and negotiate long-standing conflicts over land rights. Local groups also pushed for disaster preparedness efforts, for which Ban Nam Khem has become recognized as a model community. In the years following the disaster, the village also welcomed numerous international volunteers involved in rebuilding homes, schools, and community infrastructure.

Life at Ban Nam Khem continues to be shaped by memories of the tsunami, and annual remembrance ceremonies are held at the Ban Nam Khem Tsunami Memorial, the country's main memorial to those who died in the event, which opened in 2006. The Ban Nam Khem Tsunami Museum was constructed from 2017, and opened as a public learning centre in 2022.

== See also ==
- Effect of the 2004 Indian Ocean earthquake on Thailand
