= Mysterious Object at Noon =

- DVD cover.
- Directed by: Apichatpong Weerasethakul
- Written by: Apichatpong Weerasethakul
- Produced by: Gridthiya Gaweewong; Mingmongkol Sonakul
- Starring: Duangjai Hiransri; Phurida Vichitphan; Mesini Kaewratri
- Cinematography: Apichatpong Weerasethakul; Prasong Klimborron; Sayombhu Mukdeeprom
- Edited by: Mingmongkol Sonakul; Apichatpong Weerasethakul; Tony Morias
- Production companies: 9/6 Cinema Factory; Firecracker Film; Hubert Bals Fund
- Release date: October 2, 2000 (Canada)
- Running time: 83 minutes
- Country: Thailand
- Language: Thai

Mysterious Object at Noon (Thai: ดอกฟ้าในมือมาร, or RTGS: Dokfa Nai Meu Man, lit. 'Flower of the Heaven (High-Class Woman) in the Devil's Hand') is a 2000 Thai experimental documentary film directed by Apichatpong Weerasethakul in his feature directorial debut.

== Production ==
The film is unscripted and uses the exquisite corpse party game as a concept, with the film crew traveling across Thailand, interviewing ordinary people and asking each person to add their own words to a story. The story is acted out and these scenes are interspersed with the interviews.

The film was shot in 16mm and enlarged to 35mm for international exhibition.

== Reception ==
=== Festivals and awards ===
Mysterious Object at Noon premiered in January 2000 at the International Film Festival Rotterdam, having received support from the Hubert Bals Fund in 1998. It had its North American premiere at the Vancouver International Film Festival, where it won a special citation Dragons and Tigers Award. It won the Grand Prize (Woosuk Award) at the Jeonju International Film Festival, second prize and the NETPAC Special Mention Prize at the Yamagata International Documentary Film Festival. It was screened at many other film festivals, including London, Singapore and Hong Kong.

=== Critical reception ===
Because its experimental nature falls outside the mainstream of Thai cinema, Mysterious Object at Noon received little attention in the director's native country. However, through film festival screenings overseas, the film gained positive notice from film critics.

"Mr. Weerasethakul's film is like a piece of chamber music slowly, deftly expanding into a full symphonic movement; to watch it is to enter a fugue state that has the music and rhythms of another culture. It's really a movie that requires listening, reminding us that the medium did become talking pictures at one point," said Elvis Mitchell in The New York Times.

=== Preservation ===
Mysterious Object at Noon has been restored by the Austrian Film Museum and The Film Foundation from the best surviving elements and released on DVD in 2015. and it was released in 2017 on DVD and Blu-ray by The Criterion Collection as part of the Scorsese's World Cinema Project Series No. 2 along with Lino Brocka's Insiang.
