= Tankhun Jitt-itsara =

Thai politician, former actor and television host

- แทนคุณ จิตต์อิสระ
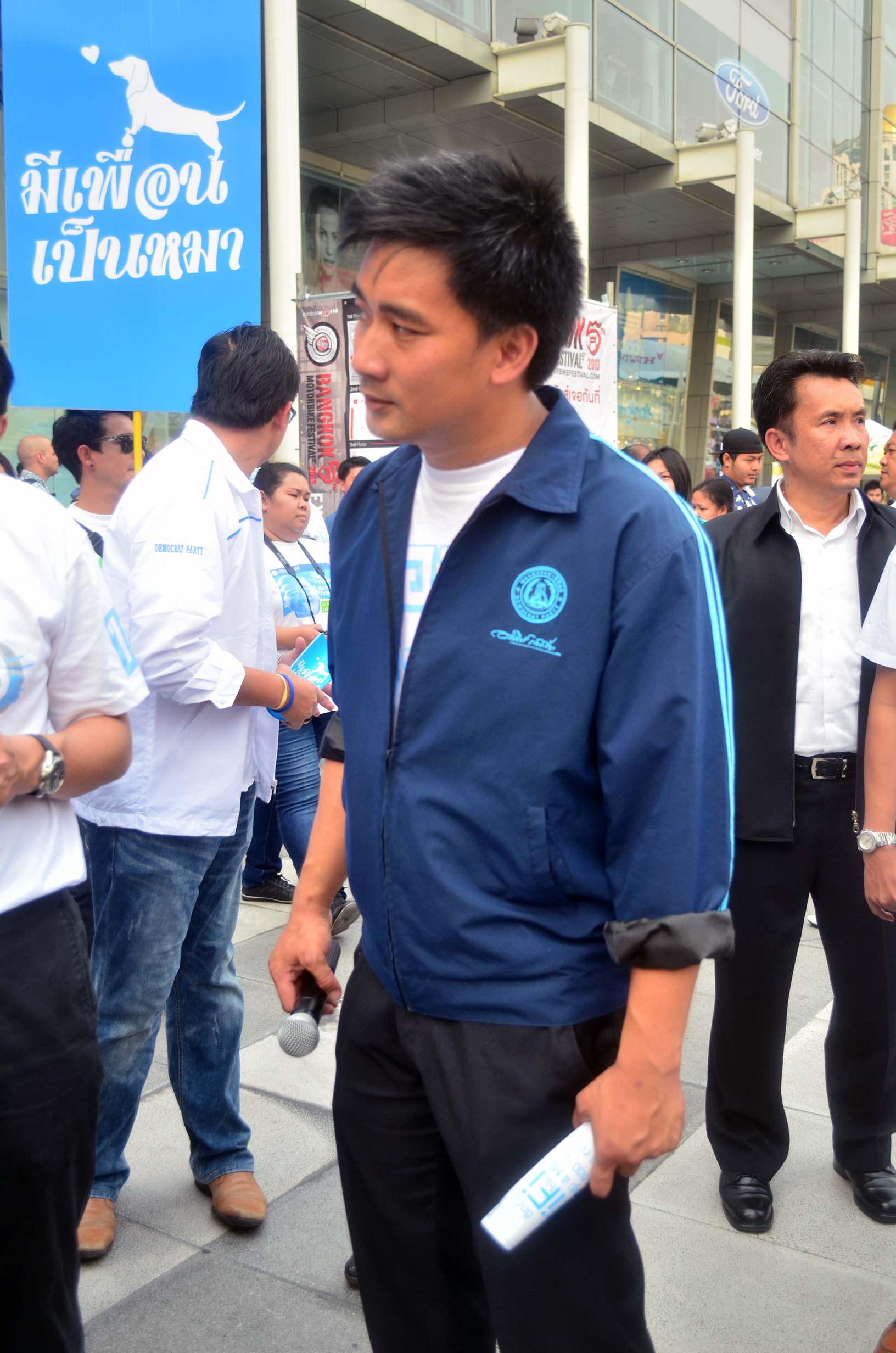
- Jitt-itsara in 2013
- Born: Ekachai Buranapanit; 4 April 1979 (age 47); Na Bon, Nakhon Si Thammarat, Thailand
- Other names: Yi; Yi Tankhun
- Education: Prakanongpittayalai School
- Alma mater: Srinakharinwirot University
- Occupations: Politician; actor; moderator
- Years active: 1990s–present
- Notable work: The Iron Ladies (2000); Fan Pan Tae (2007–09)
- Political party: Democrat Party (2011–2024); New Opportunity Party (2026–)
- Spouse: Thanyathip Jitt-itsara (divorced)

Tankhun Jitt-itsara (Thai: แทนคุณ จิตต์อิสระ; born April 4, 1979, in Na Bon district, Nakhon Si Thammarat province) is a Thai politician, former actor and television host.

== Early life and entertainment career ==
Born as Ekachai Buranapanit (เอกชัย บูรณผานิต) in a Thai family of Hokkien descent in Nakhon Si Thammarat. He became known as an actor from Torfun Gub Marwin, a 1996 television series, and The Iron Ladies, a 2000 ladyboy sport-comedy film based on true events.

The turning point in his life was his father's sudden death in October 2000. Ekachai, as the eldest son, was responsible for the family instead. He began to study dharma along with changing his name and surname to the current ones.

He is also known as a host on the hit game show Fan Pan Tae on Channel 5 between 2007 and 2009.

He is also an expert in Chinese and a serious student of Buddhism.

== Political career ==
Jitt-itsara first step in his political career was to run for general election in 2011 for Don Mueang constituency with the Democrat Party. He lost to the influential local politician Karun Hosakul of the Pheu Thai Party.

He became a Bangkok MP for the first time in the mid-2013 by-election for Don Mueang constituency to replace Hosakul who was disqualified by the Election Commission. Jitt-itsara defeated Yuranunt Pamornmontri, the replacement candidate from Pheu Thai Party, making him the first Democrat MP from Don Mueang in almost 40 years.

Later in 2024, he resigned, and in the 2026 general election, he ran as a candidate in Bangkok constituency 1 (Phra Nakhon, Pom Prap Sattru Phai, Samphanthawong, Bang Rak, and Dusit except for Thanon Nakhon Chai Si) under the New Opportunity Party. However, he was not elected, receiving a total of 1,133 votes and placing 6th.

== Filmography ==
=== Television ===
Year	Title	Role
1996	Torfun Gub Mawin	Bank
1997	Duang Fai Nai Pa Yu	
1998	Krapong Baan Kah San	
1998	Yung Nak Ruk Sa Loei	
1999	Luerd Toranong	
2000	Dr. Krok	
2000	Payong	
2000	Nong Mai Rai Borisut	
2000	Jao Sua Noi	
2000	Khae Ueam	
2001	Kot Klet Mungkorn	
2022	Phromlikhit Rak Neur Kanwela	Tan

=== Film ===
Year	Title	Role
2000	The Iron Ladies	Wit

== Royal decorations ==
- 2013 – Knight Commander (Second Class) The Most Exalted Order of the White Elephant
- 2012 – Commander (Third Class) The Most Noble Order of the Crown of Thailand
