= The Tin Mine =

2005 film

- The Thai film poster.
- Directed by: Jira Maligool
- Written by: Ajin Panjapan (story); Jira Maligool
- Produced by: Jira Maligool; Mingmongkol Sonakul; Yongyoot Thongkongtoon
- Starring: Pijaya Vachajitpan; Donlaya Mudcha
- Cinematography: Chankit Chamnivikaipong
- Edited by: Pan Busabaan
- Distributed by: GMM Tai Hub
- Release date: 17 May 2005
- Running time: 111 minutes
- Country: Thailand
- Language: Thai
- Budget: ~ 70 million baht

The Tin Mine (Thai: มหา’ลัย เหมืองแร่ or Maha'lai muang rae) is a 2005 Thai biographical drama film directed by Jira Maligool. It is adapted from short stories by Ajin Panjapan and his semi-autobiographical account of growing up in a mining camp in Kapong District of Phang Nga Province from 1949 to 1953. The Tin Mine was the official entry from Thailand for Best Foreign Language Film at the 78th Academy Awards.

== Cast ==
- Pijaya Vachajitpan as Arjin Panjapan
- Donlaya Mudcha as La-iad
- Sonthaya Chitmanee as Kai
- Anthony Howard Gould as Sam (the boss)
- Ajin Panjapan as himself
- Jaran Petcharoen as Grandpa Deang
- Niran Sattar as John
- Jumpol Thongtan as the shopkeeper
- Bill O'Leary as Tom (Sam's Brother)

== Trivia ==
- Ajin's boss gives Ajin an airline ticket to return to Bangkok, but the ticket is a flight coupon of Thai Airways International in 2005.
