= 406th Army Field Support Brigade =

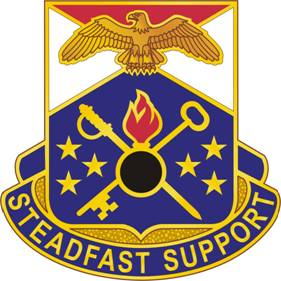
- 406th Support Brigade Distinctive Unit Insignia
- Active: 16 October 2007 - present
- Country: United States
- Branch: US Army
- Type: Support brigade
- Role: Support
- Size: Brigade
- Garrison/HQ: Ft. Bragg, NC
- Motto: Steadfast Support

Commanders
- Current commander: COL ALBERT W. DAVIS
- Command Sergeant Major: CSM TOMMY P. FITZWATER

Insignia
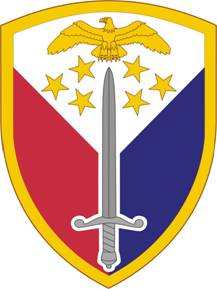
- Identification symbol: Former SSI 2007-2010

- Identification symbol: Current SSI United States Army Materiel Command

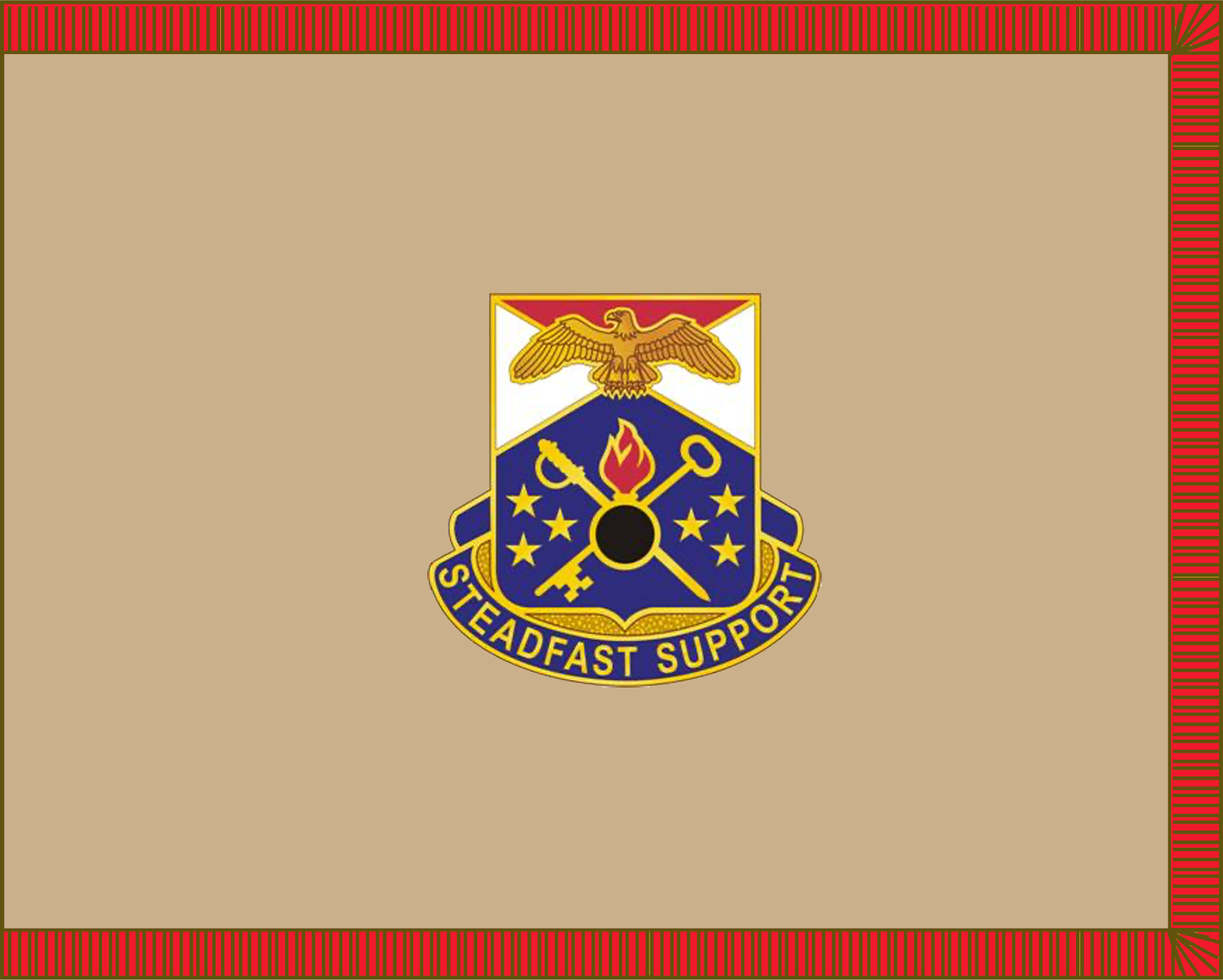
- 406th Army Support Brigade Flag

The 406th Army Field Support Brigade (AFSB) is a support brigade of the United States Army.

The unit was originally activated provisionally in March 2005 as the Army Field Support Brigade - Continental United States-East (CONUS-EAST) to support units during the Global War on Terrorism (GWOT) and the Army Prepositioned Stock-3 (APS) Afloat Program.

The AFSB conducted contingency operations supporting Operation Unified Response humanitarian assistance to Haiti in 2010, hurricane damage support to Fort Bragg, North Carolina in 2011, assistance in support of Hurricane Sandy in 2012, Ebola pandemic mission support to Africa on Operation Unified Assistance in 2015, and relief to flood-stricken Fort Jackson, South Carolina in 2015.

== Organization ==
- 406th Army Field Support Brigade, at Fort Bragg (NC)
  - Army Field Support Battalion-Bragg, at Fort Bragg (NC)
  - Army Field Support Battalion-Campbell, at Fort Campbell (KY)
  - Army Field Support Battalion-Drum, at Fort Drum (NY)
  - Army Field Support Battalion-Stewart, at Fort Stewart (GA)

== Insignia ==
The Distinctive Unit Insignia is a shield with a gold eagle in the top section. The background is a white X shape over red and blue sections. The blue contains a bursting bomb with crossed key and sword behind it and three stars on either side. Below is a scroll with the motto "Steadfast Support."

== Previous Commanders ==
Begins	Ends	Commander
2006	2008	COL Kristin French
2008	2010	COL Kenneth C. Dyer
2010	2012	COL Johnny J. Johnston
2012	2014	COL David Wilson
2014	2016	COL Richard L. Menhart
2016	2018	COL Douglas LeVien
2018	2020	COL Matthew T. Hamilton
2020	2022	COL Fredericka Harris
2022	2024	COL Larry R. Dean
2024	present	COL Albert W. Davis
