= I-San Special =

2002 Thai film

- The movie poster.
- Directed by: Mingmongkol Sonakul
- Written by: Mingmongkol Sonakul; Apichatpong Weerasethakul (idea)
- Produced by: Pongthorn Bejrajati; Mingmongkol Sonakul
- Starring: Phurida Vichitphan; Mesini Kaewratri
- Cinematography: Pongthorn Bejrajati
- Edited by: Cattleya Anghasingha
- Release date: 2002 (limited)
- Running time: 112 min.
- Country: Thailand
- Language: Thai

I-San Special (Thai: คืนพระจันทร์เต็มดวง, or Kuen pra chan tem doueng, literally Night of the Full Moon) is a 2002 Thai experimental independent drama film directed by Mingmongkol Sonakul and based on an idea by Apichatpong Weerasethakul. Set aboard a ramshackle inter-city bus traveling from Bangkok to Isan, the audio of a Thai radio soap opera is acted out by the passengers. However, when the bus stops, the drama of the passengers' normal lives is portrayed. Parallels are seen between the soap opera and reality in terms of the characters' social class.

== Cast ==
- Mesini Kaewratri as Phenprapah
- Mark Salmon as Danny
- Phurida Vichitphan as Mathavee
- Suman Thepsatit as Kittichai
- Jennafee as Mali
- Wiwat Pakklong as Noi
- Songsak Sankam as Man
- Uraiwan Phochaitho as Kan
- Patchara Leaosrisuk as Pale woman
- Thaveesak Kenkam as Bus driver
- Satit Kosalak as Drunk man

== Reception ==
A reviewer for Variety stated: "'I-san Special' is a funhouse of fantastical dreams and desires, put across with lots of wit and charm aboard a ramshackle bus. Inasmuch as it's an expansion of an original idea by Apichatpong Weerasethakul ('Blissfully Yours'), it suggests a certain esprit de corps among Thai filmmakers reminiscent of the French New Wave."

=== Festivals and awards ===
I-San Special premiered at the Singapore International Film Festival, where it was nominated for a Silver Screen Award and won a special mention FIPRESCI Prize, "For its uncompromising stance and unconventional portrayal of modern Thailand, and the conflations and deconstruction of multiple realities and genres such as the soap opera, the road movie and Thai pop culture." The film was also screened at the Vancouver International Film Festival and the San Francisco International Asian American Film Festival. It received a limited release in Thailand in 2002, but was screened at the 2003 Bangkok International Film Festival.
