= Ajin Panjapan =

Thai writer (1927–2018)

Ajin Panjapan (Thai: อาจินต์ ปัญจพรรค์, 11 October 1927 – 17 November 2018) was a Thai writer, best known for his Tine Mine series of short stories, based on his experiences in the tin dredging operations of Phang-nga Province. He also wrote articles, novels, radio and television dramas, poetry, and songs, and edited and co-published Fah Muang Thai, a highly successful weekly literary magazine which launched the careers of many Thai writers. Ajin was named National Artist in literature in 1991.

== See also ==
- The Tin Mine, a 2005 film adaptation of the short story series written by Ajin
