= Khao Lak =

Human settlement in Phang Nga Province, Thailand

Khao Lak เขาหลัก (Thai)
- Coast
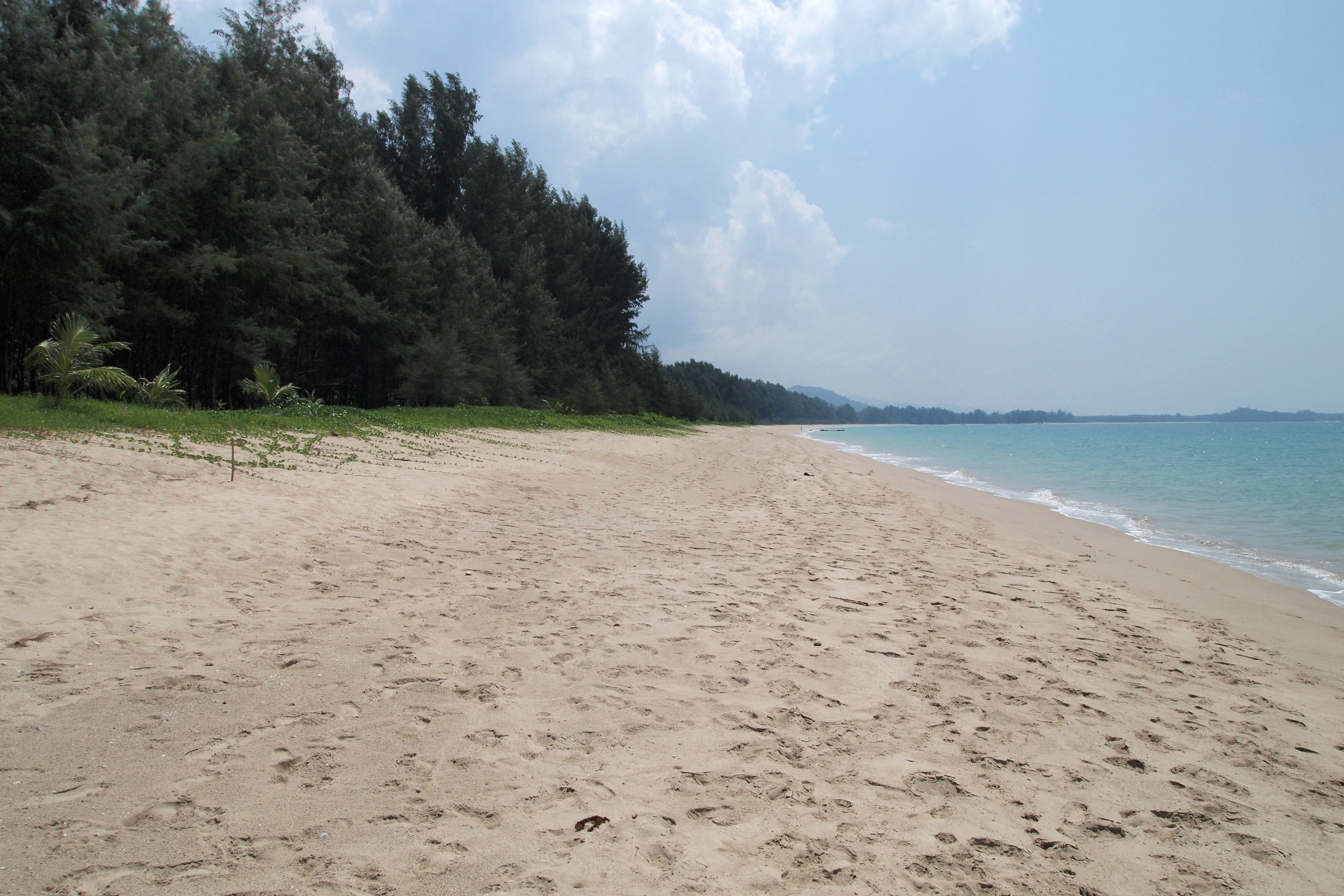
- Khao Lak–Lam Ru National Park

- Location within Thailand
- Coordinates: 8°41′20″N 98°15′00″E
- Location: Takua Pa and Thai Mueang, Phang Nga, Thailand
- Water bodies: Andaman Sea
- Etymology: Main Mountain

Dimensions
  - Length: 20 kilometres (12 mi)

Khao Lak (Thai: เขาหลัก, pronounced [kʰǎw làk]) is a small village in the Takua Pa District of Phang Nga Province, Thailand, located south of Lak Mountain. Tour operators like to use the popular name to refer to a series of nearby villages, now primarily tourist-oriented, mainly in Takua Pa District.

The name "Khao Lak" literally translates to 'Main Mountain'. This was one of the peaks used by ancient seafarers as a landmark to guide them into the safe harbor at Thap Lamu. Lak Mountain is one of the main peaks in the hilly, mountainous region (maximum height 1,050 meters (3,440 ft) in Khao Lak-Lam Ru National Park.

The tiny village of Ban Khao Lak, the original beach, Hat Khao Lak, and the bay of Khao Lak (Ao Khao Lak) all lie within the Lam Kaen Sub-district of Thai Mueang District. However, the name Khao Lak has now grown to enclose many other villages in the area, mostly on the northern side of the mountain in the Khuk Khak Sub-district of Takua Pa District.

== History ==
The lush area around Khao Lak was once called Takola. Artifacts dating back to 1,400 years show evidence it was a significant coastal town and trading post of the ancient Maritime Silk Route.

In 1987, over nine huts were found inside cashew nut trees of Khao Lak Resort, where species of Thai wildlife are a common sight. Khao Lak was mentioned for the first time in 1988 in the second edition of Traveller Handbuch Thailand by Stefan Loose Verlag.

=== 2004 tsunami ===
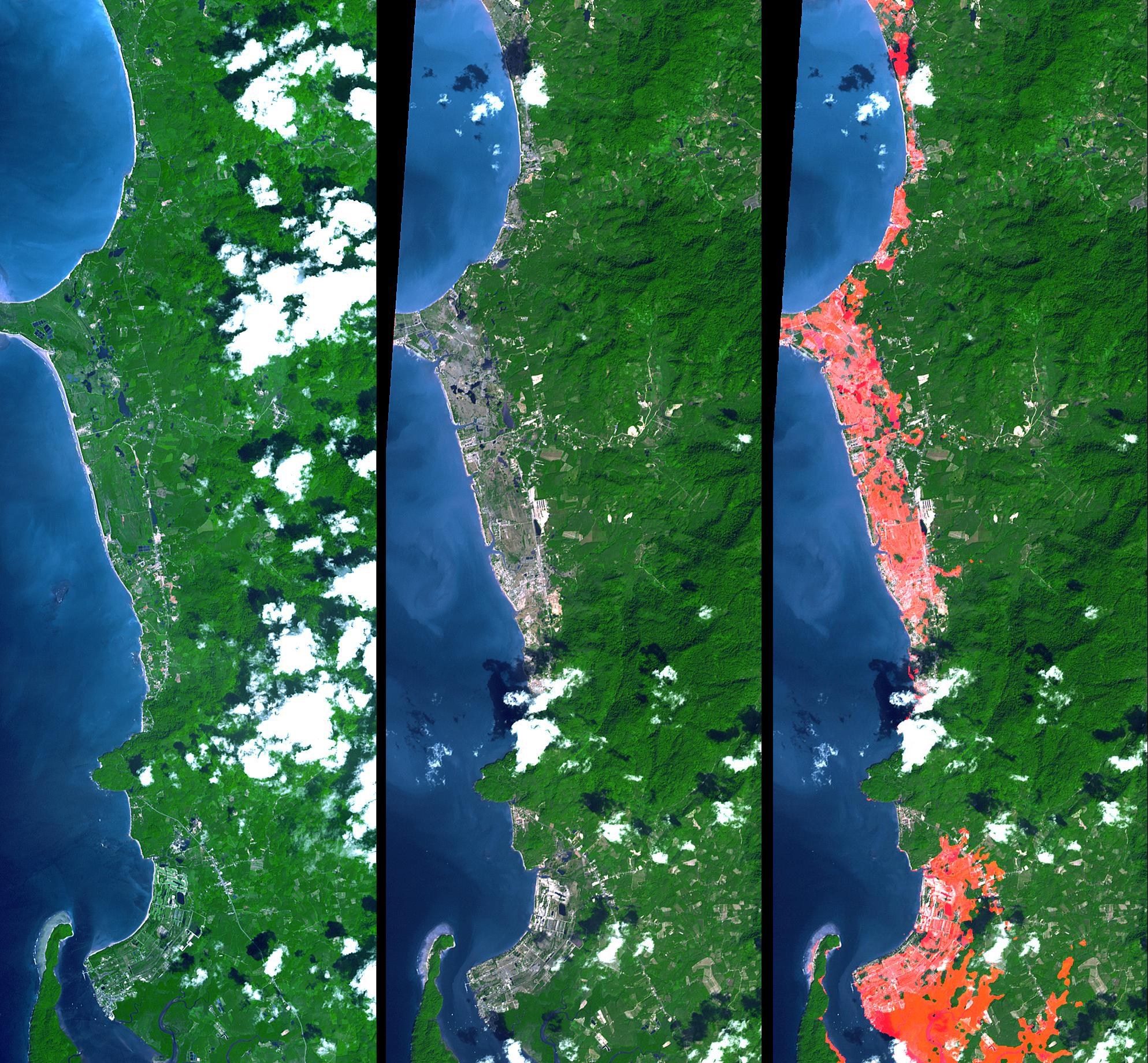
Tsunami inundation at Khao Lak; the resort area is in the middle

Khao Lak was the coastal area of Thailand hardest hit by the tsunami resulting from the 26 December 2004 Indian Ocean earthquake. Many people died including many foreign tourists. The final death toll was over 4,000, with local unofficial estimates topping 10,000 due to the lack of accurate government censuses and the fact that much of the migrant Burmese population was not documented nor recognized as legal residents.

Most of the coastal landscape was destroyed by the tsunami. Some replanting programmes have been initiated and a great deal has been accomplished in the rejuvenation of surrounding foliage. Studies suggesting that coastal vegetation may have helped buffer the effects of the waves have ensured that replanting and maintenance of the coastal vegetation have become a priority in the reconstruction of the landscape.

The force of the tsunami washed Patrol Boat 813 (Tor 813) almost 1.25 kilometres (0.78 miles) inland from Bang Niang Beach. It was on patrol, guarding Poom Jensen, a grandson of the king, as he was jet skiing in front of La Flora Resort. Despite rescue efforts, he could not be saved. His mother, Princess Ubol Ratana, and sister survived by fleeing to an upper story of La Flora. Patrol Boat 813 remains at the spot where it was deposited by the tsunami and has been preserved as a museum ship.

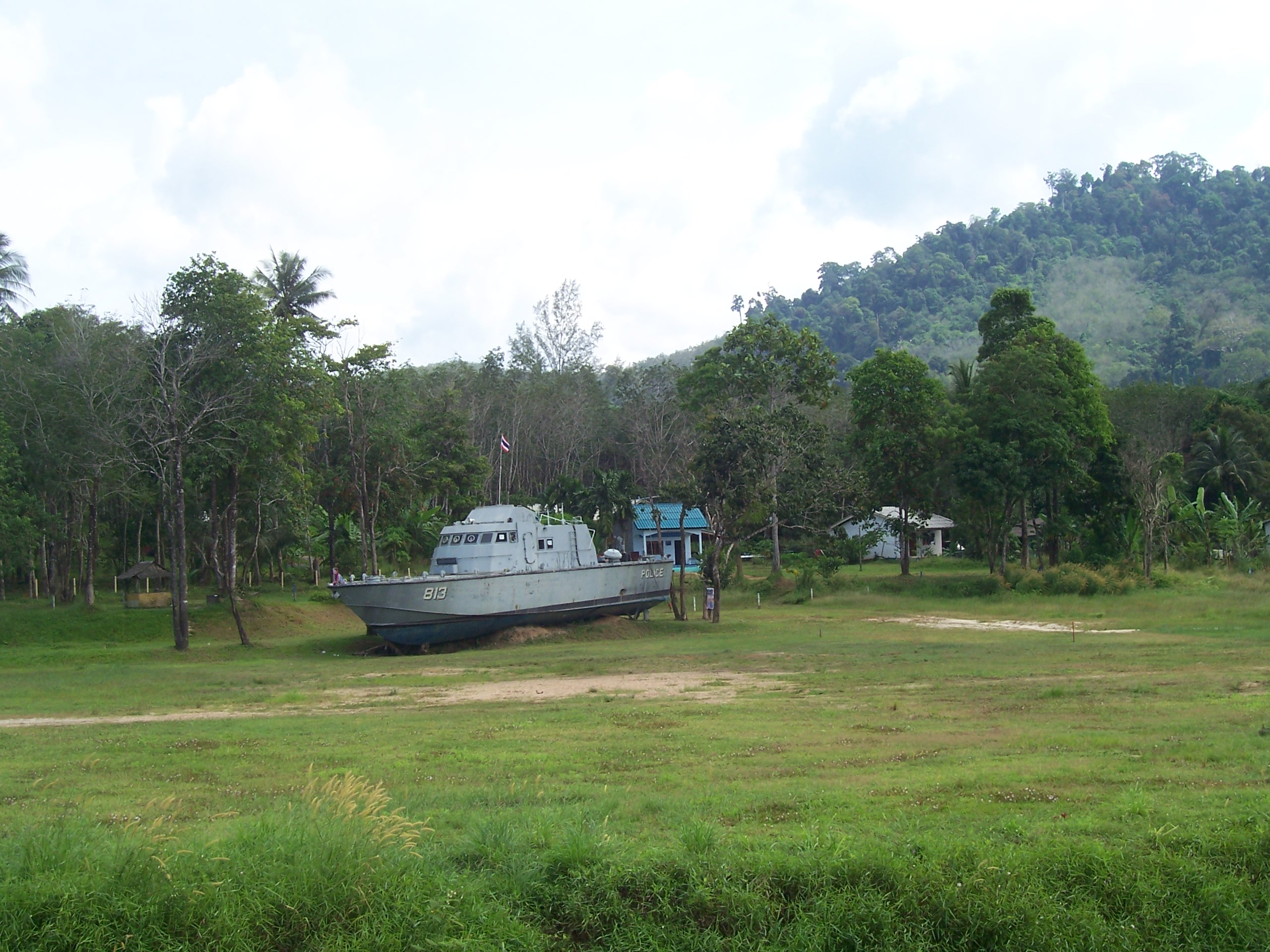
Patrol Boat 813 on display in Khao Lak, where it was washed inland during the tsunami

Others among the casualties were well-known Finnish musician and TV host Aki Sirkesalo and his family, and Imre von Polgar, guitarist for the Swedish rock band, The Watermelon Men. Almost four years old at the time, a young girl was swept away at Khao Lak and remained the subject of a media-covered intensive search despite being formally identified in August 2005 as a victim. Jane Holland, the elder daughter of film director and actor Richard Attenborough, perished in the tsunami with several members of her family. Finnish politician Sauli Niinistö and his adult son survived by clinging to a power pole.

Since the 2004 tsunami, an early-warning system has been installed along the affected coastline. In April 2012, it received its most recent test following an earthquake off the coast of Sumatra. Audible warning sirens alerted the local population to the possibility of a tsunami roughly two hours before estimated landfall, allowing the populace to move to higher ground inland.

The 2012 film The Impossible is based on the experiences of María Belón and her family, who survived the 2004 tsunami, and was also filmed in Khao Lak.

== Geography ==
Khao Lak is a series of villages, now tourist-oriented, mainly in the Takua Pa District and partly in the Thai Mueang District of Phang Nga Province, Thailand. It is located on the Andaman Sea coastline, approximately 60 kilometers north of Phuket. The region is known for its tranquil beaches, lush tropical landscapes, and as a departure point for diving trips to the Similan Islands.

=== Beaches ===
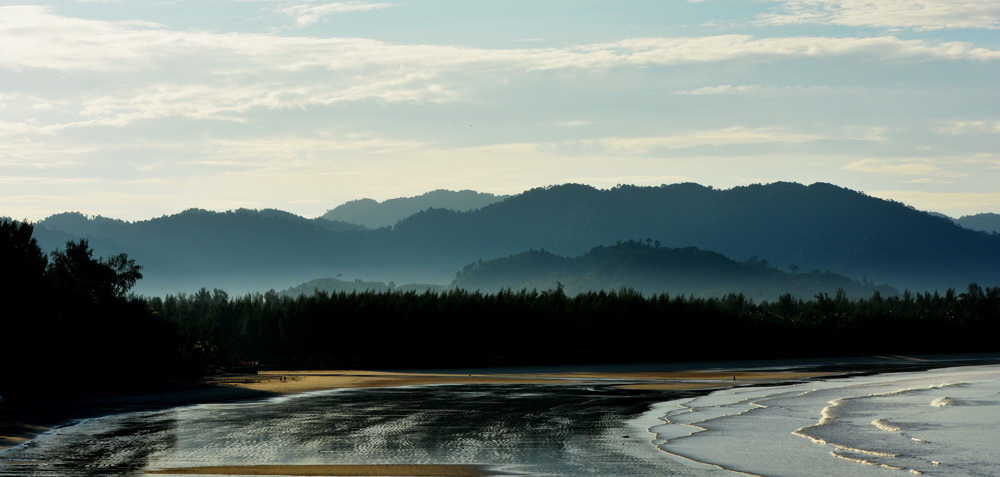
Pakarang Cape, early morning

It is generally accepted that Khao Lak beaches include (from south to north):

- Kha Luk Beach, Lam Kaen and Phang-nga Naval Base
- Klong Ri An Beach, south of the headland marking the southern boundary of the region
- Nang Thong Beach, in the village of Bang La On (frequently called—mistakenly—Khao Lak)
- Bang Niang, in the village of the same name some 2–3 km (1.2–1.9 mi) north of Bang La On
- Khuk Khak, in the village of the same name some 2–3 km (1.2–1.9 mi) north of Bang Niang
- Cape Pakarang, north of Khuk Khak
- Ao Tong Beach, north side of Cape Pakarang
- Ma Kam Beach, north side of Cape Pakarang
- Bang Sak, north of Cape Pakarang
- Bang Lat Beach, north of Laem Tantawan

Taken together, these beaches stretch for some 25 kilometres (16 miles) along the Andaman Sea. All beaches are public, as are all beaches in Thailand.

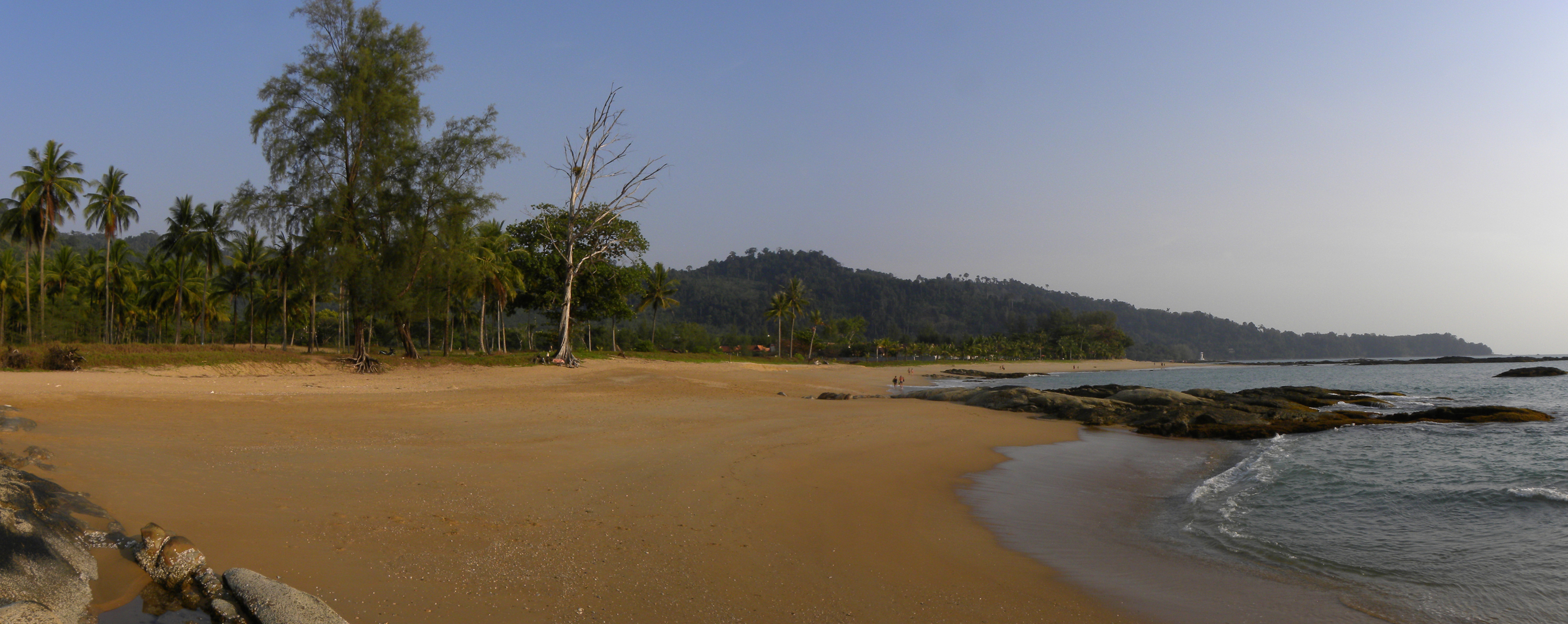
Khao Lak beach (March 2010)

=== Weather ===
The weather in Khao Lak can be separated into two distinct seasons. The dry season between November and April, and the monsoon season from May to October. Khao Lak is mostly warm all year round with temperatures averaging around 28 °C to 32 °C.

In the dry season it is not uncommon for Khao Lak to go without rain for around six weeks at a time. This is the main tourist season when the weather is more settled. During this time the wind generally comes from the East, meaning the town is sheltered by its position on the Western side of the mountains near the coast.

In the monsoon season however the wind changes direction and comes from the West where it reflects off the mountains and causes strong winds, waves and storm like conditions in the area.

== Economy ==
Since the tsunami, Khao Lak's infrastructure and economy have bounced back. Coastal resorts have been reconstructed or repaired, and new ones have been built or are in the process of being built. In 2016, there were reportedly 7,822 hotel rooms at 104 registered accommodations. Occupancy rates range from 70 to 90 percent during the high season period (November–March).

Over time, the economy in the Khao Lak region has evolved and changed. In the past, tin mining played a significant role as an economic sector. Today, other industries have come to the forefront. Shrimp farms contribute to food production, while fishing continues to be a source of income. Rubber plantations provide raw materials for various products, and palm oil plantations are also an important economic factor. Additionally, fruit plantations, especially for exotic fruits like mangosteen, rambutan, and durian, have become established.

Today, tourism has become the main source of income for the region, significantly shaping Khao Lak's economic landscape. However, during the COVID-19 pandemic, there was an increased focus on agriculture. This emphasis has helped stabilize the economy in a time of uncertainty and showcases the diversity and adaptability of the economic sectors in Khao Lak.

== Administration ==
The Khao Lak region falls almost entirely within the Khuk Khak Sub-district (tambon) of the Takua Pa District (amphoe) of Phang Nga Province. The Takua Pa District is divided into eight sub-districts. The village of Ban Khao Lak does not fall within the Khuk Khak sub-district, the area commonly thought of as "Khao Lak".

| No. | Name | Thai name | Pop. |
| 1. | Takua Pa | ตะกั่วป่า | - | 8,575 |
| 2. | Bang Nai Si | บางนายสี | 9 | 9,979 |
| 3. | Bang Sai | บางไทร | 7 | 2,606 |
| 4. | Bang Muang | บางม่วง | 8 | 9,836 |
| 5. | Tam Tua | ตำตัว | 6 | 1,631 |
| 6. | Khok Khian | โคกเคียน | 9 | 5,599 |
| 7. | Khuek Khak | คึกคัก | 7 | 4,638 |
| 8. | Ko Kho Khao | เกาะคอเขา | 5 | 848 |

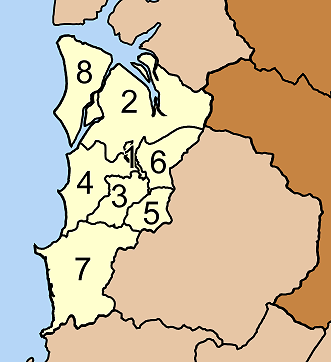
