= The Iron Ladies =

2000 film by Yongyoot Thongkongtoon

- Theatrical release poster
- Directed by: Youngyooth Thongkonthun
- Written by: Visuttchai Boonyakarnjawa; Jira Maligool; Youngyooth Thongkonthun
- Produced by: Prasert Wiwattananonpong; Chatchawarin Klainark
- Starring: Jesdaporn Pholdee; Sahaphap Tor; Ekachai Buranapanit; Giorgio Maiocchi; Chaicharn Nimpulsawasdi; Kokkorn Benjathikoon; Shiriohana Hongsopon
- Cinematography: Jira Maligool
- Edited by: Sunij Asavinikul
- Music by: Amornbhong Methakunavudh
- Distributed by: Tai Entertainment
- Release date: 8 March 2000
- Running time: 110 mins (International version); 117 mins (Thai version)
- Country: Thailand
- Language: Thai
- Box office: 99 million Baht (US$3,000,000) (Thailand); US$110,825 (US); S$517,163 (Singapore)

The Iron Ladies (Thai: สตรีเหล็ก or Satree lek) is a 2000 Thai comedy film directed by Youngyooth Thongkonthun and written by Youngyooth Thongkonthun, Visuttchai Boonyakarnjawa and Jira Maligool. It was Thongkonthun's directorial debut. The film follows the true events of a men's volleyball team, composed mainly of gay and kathoey (transgender) athletes.

In 2003, the combined sequel and prequel called The Iron Ladies 2 (Satree Lek 2) was released. The film is based upon how the characters of The Iron Ladies met, and how they would later reunite for another volleyball tournament.

== Plot ==
The film was released in 2000 and is set in 1996, when the real team competed and won the national championships in Thailand. The two main characters, Mon and Jung, play two gay transgender women, who had been constantly overlooked by volleyball coaches because of their appearance. However, when a local team changes coaches, the new coach holds tryouts for a new team. When Mon and Jung are selected, most of the old players resign, leaving the new coach, Coach Bee, in a sticky predicament.

Mon and Jung are then forced to enlist the help of other gay and transgender friends who they used to play volleyball with in university. These new players include Wit, who hasn't told his fiancée he is gay, Pia, a transgender dancer and Nong, a gay army conscript. When the competition begins, all but one player in the team are gay or transgender.

Because of their appearance on court, many of the match officials intend to ban the team, soon dubbed "The Iron Ladies", from the tournament. However, seeing how much the team is liked by the crowd soon changes many of their opinions.

At the end credits of the film, the real "Iron Ladies" are shown as they were at the time of making the film.

== Cast ==
- Jesdaporn Pholdee – Chai
- Sahaphap Tor – Mon
- Chaicharn Nimpulsawasdi – Jung
- Giorgio Maiocchi – Nong
- Ekachai Buranapanit – Wit
- Kokkorn Benjathikoon – Pia
- Shiriohana Hongsopon – Coach Bee
- Phomsit Sitthijamroenkhun – April
- Sutthipong Sitthijamroenkhun – May
- Anucha Chatkaew – June
- Kittipat Samarntragulchai - Dao

== Reception ==
The film grossed 99 million Baht (US$3 million) in Thailand, and was the second-highest grossing Thai film of all time behind Nang Nak (1999). It also reached number one at the box office in Hong Kong. It was the first Thai film to be released commercially in the United States.

== Accolades ==
A hit in Thailand as well as the international film festival circuit, the film has been nominated twelve times and won ten awards, including the Thailand National Film Association Awards, Toronto International Film Festival and the reader award of German LGBTQ magazine Siegessäule at the Berlin International Film Festival. It also played at the Pusan International Film Festival, the San Francisco Asian American Film Festival, the Miami Gay and Lesbian Film Festival, the Los Angeles Asian Pacific Film Festival, the Seattle International Film Festival, the San Francisco International Lesbian and Gay Film Festival and the Swedish International Comedy Film Festival.
