= Jira Maligool =

Thai film director (born 1961)

- จิระ มะลิกุล
- Born: 24 February 1961 (age 65); Thailand
- Occupation: Film director
- Years active: 2002–present
- Notable work: Mekhong Full Moon Party (2002); The Tin Mine (2005)

Jira Maligool (Thai: จิระ มะลิกุล; RTGS: Chira Malikun; born 1961) is a Thai film director, screenwriter and producer. He has directed three films, Mekhong Full Moon Party, The Tin Mine and Seven Something (segment: "42.195"), and was the screenwriter behind the international hit, The Iron Ladies.

== Biography ==
=== Early career ===
Born in Thailand in 1961, Jira graduated in 1983 from Chulalongkorn University Faculty of Communication Arts, where he majored in film and photography. While still a student, he worked as a music video and movie commercial director.

In 1991, he co-founded his own film studio, Hub Ho Hin Bangkok (later working through the subsidiary Hub Ho Hin Films). In 2003, it partnered with GMM Grammy's film division GMM Pictures and Visute Poolvoralaks' company Tai Entertainment to form GMM Tai Hub (or GTH). In 2016, he became key person for GDH 559, a film studio that was the successor to GTH.

=== First features ===
Jira started out in feature films as the screenwriter for the 2000 film, The Iron Ladies (Satree lek), which was based on a true story about a gay and transvestite (katoey) men's volleyball team that won the Thailand national championship in 1996. The film went on to be a box-office hit in Thailand and has been a popular feature at international film festivals. It was directed by Youngyooth Thongkonthun, who's gone on to direct a sequel to Iron Ladies as well as another comedy, M.A.I.D. and 2006's Metrosexual.

=== Hit producer ===
He was also behind the hit 2003 film, Fan Chan (My Girl), a nostalgic look at childhood in 1980s' Thailand. The film's ensemble of six directors – Komgrit Treewimol, Songyos Sugmakanan, Nithiwat Tharathorn, Vijja Kojew, Vithaya Thongyuyong and Adisorn Tresirikasem – were students of Jira, who also taught as a part-time professor in photography and cinematography classes at Chulalongkorn University. Two of those directors, Komgrit and Songyos, went on to direct hit films; Komgrit's romantic comedy Dear Dakanda in 2005 and Songyos' hit 2006 thriller Dek hor (Dorm).

Jira's second directorial effort, The Tin Mine, was a lavish production about a tin mine in southern Thailand in the 1950s. It was based on the short stories of Thai author Archin Panjabhan, who served as an adviser on the production. The film fared poorly at the Thai box office, but it has won several awards and has been featured at international film festivals.

== Filmography ==
=== Director ===
- Mekhong Full Moon Party (2002)
- The Tin Mine (Maha'lai muang rae) (2005)
- Seven Something (segment: "42.195") (2012)
- A Gift (segment: "New Year Greeting") (2016)

=== Producer ===
- Fan Chan (My Girl) (2003)
- The Iron Ladies 2 (Satree lek 2) (2003)
- Jaew M.A.I.D.: Mission Almost Impossible Done (2004)
- The Tin Mine (Maha'lai muang rae) (2005)
- Dear Dakanda (Peun sanit) (2005)
- Dek hor (Dorm) (2006)

=== Screenwriter ===
- The Iron Ladies (Satree lek) (2000)
- Mekhong Full Moon Party (2002)
- The Tin Mine (Maha'lai muang rae) (2005)

=== Cinematographer ===
- The Iron Ladies (Satree lek) (2000)
- The Iron Ladies 2 (Satree lek 2) (2003)

== Awards and nominations ==
- Winner, FIPRESCI Prize, 2003 Hong Kong International Film Festival, Mekhong Full Moon Party.
- Winner, best director and best screenplay, 2002 Thailand National Film Awards, Mekhong Full Moon Party.
- Thailand's official selection, Best Foreign Language Film, 78th Academy Awards, The Tin Mine.
- Winner, best picture and best director, 2005 Thailand National Film Awards, The Tin Mine.
- Winner, best film, 2005 Bangkok Critic Assembly, The Tin Mine.
