= Takua Pa district =

Takua Pa ตะกั่วป่า
- District
- District location in Phang Nga province
- Coordinates: 8°52′10″N 98°20′35″E
- Country: Thailand
- Province: Phang Nga
- Seat: Takua Pa

Area
  - Total: 599.4 km^{2} (231.4 sq mi)

Population (6 November 2002)
  - Total: 48,004
  - Density: 72.5/km^{2} (188/sq mi)
- Time zone: UTC+7 (ICT)
- Postal code: 82110
- Geocode: 8205

Takua Pa (Thai: ตะกั่วป่า, pronounced [tā.kùa̯ pàː]) is a district (amphoe) in Phang Nga province in south Thailand.

== Geography ==
The district is on the Andaman Sea coast. To the north of the district is Si Phang Nga National Park. The southern part of the district contains Khao Lak-Lam Ru National Park, which includes the beach resorts of Khao Lak, devastated by the tsunami resulting from the 2004 Indian Ocean earthquake.

Neighboring districts are Khura Buri to the north, Phanom of Surat Thani province, Kapong to the east, and Thai Mueang to the south.

== History ==
Map of Takua Pa as a province of Siam in 1900

Originally named Takola (Thai: ตะโกลา), the town was one of the historic city states (mueang) dating back to Srivijaya times in the 13th century. It was also known as Takkolam (Tamil: தக்கோலம்) which is the Tamil word for "piper cubeba" and "calyptranthes jambalana". There is also a place in the Tamil country which up to now carries the same name Takkolam. Takua Pa could have either abounded in the spices "calyptranthese jambalana" and "piper cubeba" or it could have been occupied by settlers from the Takkolam of the Tamil country, or both. Takua Pa is said to have been the finest harbor on the west coast of the peninsula for trade between the kingdom of Srivijaya and the early Tamil kingdoms of the Cholas and Pallavas during different times in history. It was later renamed Takua Pa due to the rich ores found near the town: takua (ตะกั่ว) is the Thai word for lead, even though tin was the most important ore found there.

Laem Pho Beach in the Chaiya district of Surat Thani province, on the other side of the isthmus 200 km distant, is thought to have been a Srivijaya Kingdom seaport in the 7th to 13th centuries. Srivijaya was an Indonesian city-state that grew to become an influential maritime power in what is now Southeast Asia. Tang dynasty (7th–10th centuries) ceramics have been found in the area as well as pottery from India and glassware from Persia. Similar finds have been made in Ban Thung Tuek of Takua Pa District, indicating that there may have been an overland route connecting the Gulf of Thailand with the Andaman Seacoast. This route would have enabled traders to avoid piracy in the narrow Strait of Malacca.

There was a Hindu/Vishnu temple there in the 8th century CE. An important mercantile organisation called Kodumbalur Manigramam, built a water tank for this temple. They left an inscription in Tamil. The tank was called "Avani Naaranam", the name of one of the Pallava emperors of Tamil Nadu.

The town was long administered by Nakhon Si Thammarat. In 1892 it was converted to a province, part of the Monthon Phuket. This province was merged into Phang Nga Province on 1 April 1932. The district, Talat Yai ('big market', ตลาดใหญ่), was then renamed Takua Pa.

The district was an important tin-dredging area in the first half of the 20th century, with the English company, Siamese Tin Syndicate Ltd., and the Australian company, Satupulo No Liability Co., both operating dredges in the rivers, with narrow-gauge tramways following them upstream. The Asiatic Company also had a dredge and tramway further inland in Kapong District, depicted in the Thai film, The Tin Mine. Siamese Tin operated here at least as late as 1967, but Thai firms assumed operations by the early-1980s. By 2008 there were no remaining signs of mining, as plantations, particularly rubber, covered the former dredged areas. The public library at Takua Pa town has photographs on display of the dredging and sluicing operations in their heyday in the 1920s and 1930s. The former Asiatic Company workshops can also still be seen in Kapong town.

The centre for the identification of bodies found after the 2004 tsunami is in the district. Opposite the identification centre is the cemetery where all unidentified foreign bodies have been buried. Laid out somewhat like the Commonwealth War Graves cemetery at Kanchanaburi. By late-2008 the cemetery was overgrown, run down, and inhabited by feral dogs.

== Administration ==
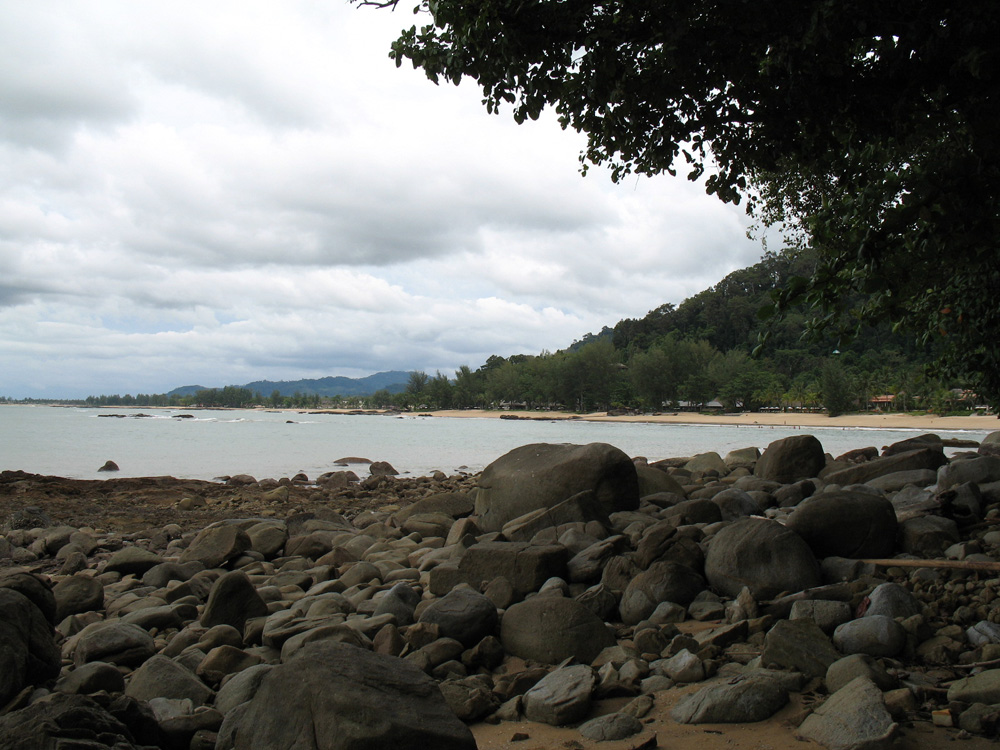
Bang Muang Beach

=== Central administration ===
Takua Pa district is divided into eight sub-districts (tambons), which are further subdivided into 51 administrative villages (mubans).

No.	Name	Thai	Villages	Pop.
1.	Takua Pa	ตะกั่วป่า	-	8,815
2.	Bang Nai Si	บางนายสี	9	11,767
3.	Bang Sai	บางไทร	7	2,876
4.	Bang Muang	บางม่วง	8	10,091
5.	Tam Tua	ตำตัว	6	1,609
6.	Khok Khian	โคกเคียน	9	6,076
7.	Khuek Khak	คึกคัก	7	5,870
8.	Ko Kho Khao	เกาะคอเขา	5	900

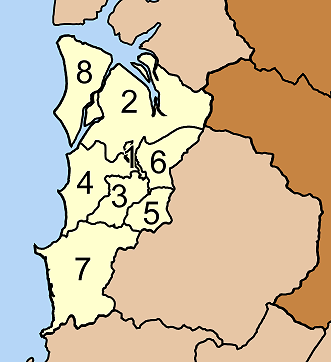

=== Local administration ===
There is one town (thesaban mueang) in the district:

- Takua Pa (Thai: เทศบาลเมืองตะกั่วป่า) consisting of sub-district Takua Pa.

There are two sub-district municipalities (thesaban tambon) in the district:

- Bang Nai Si (Thai: เทศบาลตำบลบางนายสี) consisting of sub-district Bang Nai Si.
- Khuek Khak (Thai: เทศบาลตำบลคึกคัก) consisting of sub-district Khuek Khak.

There are four subdistrict administrative organizations (SAO) in the district:

- Bang Sai (Thai: องค์การบริหารส่วนตำบลบางไทร) consisting of sub-districts Bang Sai and Tam Tua.
- Bang Muang (Thai: องค์การบริหารส่วนตำบลบางม่วง) consisting of sub-district Bang Muang.
- Khok Khian (Thai: องค์การบริหารส่วนตำบลโคกเคียน) consisting of sub-district Khok Khian.
- Ko Kho Khao (Thai: องค์การบริหารส่วนตำบลเกาะคอเขา) consisting of sub-district Ko Kho Khao.

Takua Pa itself has town (thesaban mueang) status and covers the complete tambon Takua Pa. There are six tambon administrative organizations (TAO). Takua Pa is administered by the town council and Tam Tua by a neighboring TAO, Bang Sai.

No.	Name	Thai	Village	Pop.
1.	Takua Pa	ตะกั่วป่า	-	8,469
2.	Bang Nai Si	บางนายสี	9	10,820
3.	Bang Sai	บางไทร	7	2,752
4.	Bang Muang	บางม่วง	8	10,235
5.	Tam Tua	ตำตัว	6	1,581
6.	Khok Khian	โคกเคียน	9	5,747
7.	Khuek Khak	คึกคัก	7	5,172
8.	Ko Kho Khao	เกาะคอเขา	5	854

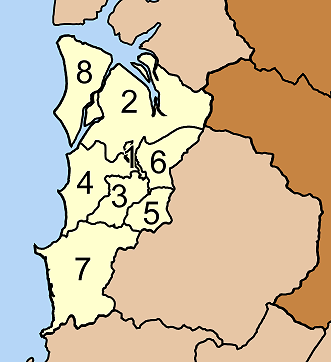

== Climate ==
Climate data for Takua Pa (1991–2020, extremes 1981-present)
Month	Jan	Feb	Mar	Apr	May	Jun	Jul	Aug	Sep	Oct	Nov	Dec	Year
Record high °C (°F)	36.0 (96.8)	38.2 (100.8)	38.1 (100.6)	38.4 (101.1)	38.0 (100.4)	36.1 (97.0)	36.3 (97.3)	35.2 (95.4)	34.9 (94.8)	35.5 (95.9)	35.5 (95.9)	35.6 (96.1)	38.4 (101.1)
Mean daily maximum °C (°F)	32.6 (90.7)	33.2 (91.8)	33.6 (92.5)	33.7 (92.7)	32.6 (90.7)	31.9 (89.4)	31.5 (88.7)	31.3 (88.3)	30.9 (87.6)	31.1 (88.0)	31.8 (89.2)	31.9 (89.4)	32.2 (89.9)
Daily mean °C (°F)	26.7 (80.1)	27.1 (80.8)	27.8 (82.0)	28.3 (82.9)	27.9 (82.2)	27.7 (81.9)	27.5 (81.5)	27.3 (81.1)	26.7 (80.1)	26.5 (79.7)	26.7 (80.1)	26.7 (80.1)	27.2 (81.0)
Mean daily minimum °C (°F)	22.1 (71.8)	22.3 (72.1)	23.3 (73.9)	24.3 (75.7)	24.7 (76.5)	24.6 (76.3)	24.6 (76.3)	24.5 (76.1)	23.9 (75.0)	23.5 (74.3)	23.2 (73.8)	22.7 (72.9)	23.6 (74.6)
Record low °C (°F)	16.0 (60.8)	17.3 (63.1)	18.6 (65.5)	20.3 (68.5)	21.7 (71.1)	20.8 (69.4)	21.1 (70.0)	21.0 (69.8)	20.9 (69.6)	19.7 (67.5)	19.9 (67.8)	17.4 (63.3)	16.0 (60.8)
Average precipitation mm (inches)	62.1 (2.44)	45.1 (1.78)	145.1 (5.71)	221.7 (8.73)	430.9 (16.96)	456.6 (17.98)	465.8 (18.34)	570.0 (22.44)	635.7 (25.03)	529.4 (20.84)	231.7 (9.12)	78.4 (3.09)	3,872.5 (152.46)
Average precipitation days (≥ 1.0 mm)	4.9	4.1	8.6	13.6	20.2	18.9	19.7	20.5	22.5	21.6	13.8	6.9	175.3
Average relative humidity (%)	78.7	78.1	80.0	82.5	85.7	85.8	86.0	86.7	88.3	88.3	85.0	80.1	83.8
Mean monthly sunshine hours	232.5	214.7	201.5	183.0	155.0	114.0	114.7	114.7	108.0	108.5	174.0	195.3	1,915.9
Mean daily sunshine hours	7.5	7.6	6.5	6.1	5.0	3.8	3.7	3.7	3.6	3.5	5.8	6.3	5.3
Source 1: World Meteorological Organization
Source 2: Office of Water Management and Hydrology, Royal Irrigation Department (sun 1981–2010)(extremes)
