= Thai Mueang district =

Thai Mueang ท้ายเหมือง
- District
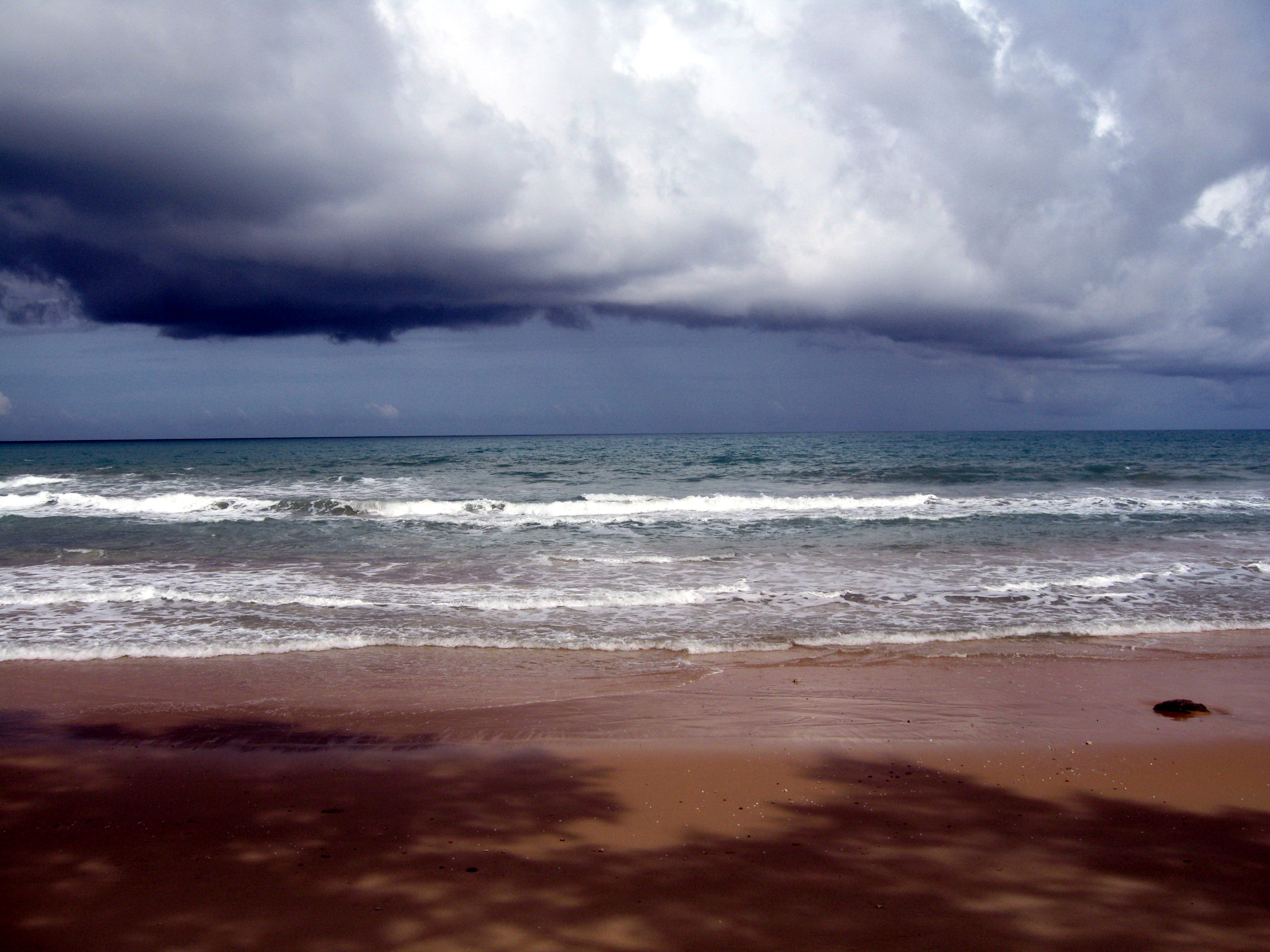
- Thai Mueang Beach, part of Khao Lampi–Hat Thai Mueang National Park

- District location in Phang Nga province
- Coordinates: 8°24′0″N 98°15′42″E
- Country: Thailand
- Province: Phang Nga

Area
  - Total: 611.8 km^{2} (236.2 sq mi)

Population (1 April 2000)
  - Total: 45,547
  - Density: 74.4/km^{2} (193/sq mi)
- Time zone: UTC+7 (ICT)
- Postal code: 82120
- Geocode: 8208

Thai Mueang (Thai: ท้ายเหมือง, pronounced [tʰáːj mɯ̌a̯ŋ]) is a district (amphoe) in Phang Nga province in the south of Thailand.

== History ==
Its name, Thai Mueang, literally translates to "End of the Mine", reflecting the local history, as the area was once filled with tin mines.

In 1908, the area held the status of a minor district (king amphoe) under Thung Maphrao district. Later, in 1938, the government upgraded it to a full district (amphoe) and downgraded Thung Maphrao district to a sub-district (tambon), as it remains today.

== Geography ==
Neighboring districts are (from the north clockwise): Takua Pa, Kapong, Mueang Phang Nga, and Takua Thung. To the west is the Andaman Sea.

Khao Lampi–Hat Thai Mueang National Park was established in 1986 and covers 72 km^{2}. The park consists of two parts: the beach of Thai Mueang as well as natural rain forest on Lampi mountain.

== Administration ==
The district is divided into six sub-districts (tambons), which are further subdivided into 40 villages (mubans). Thai Mueang itself has township (thesaban tambon) status. There are six tambon administrative organizations (TAO).

No.	Name	Thai name	Villages	Pop.
1.	Thai Mueang	ท้ายเหมือง	9	11,172
2.	Na Toei	นาเตย	9	8,919
3.	Bang Thong	บางทอง	7	5,075
4.	Thung Maphrao	ทุ่งมะพร้าว	11	8,908
5.	Lam Phi	ลำภี	7	4,827
6.	Lam Kaen	ลำแก่น	6	6,646

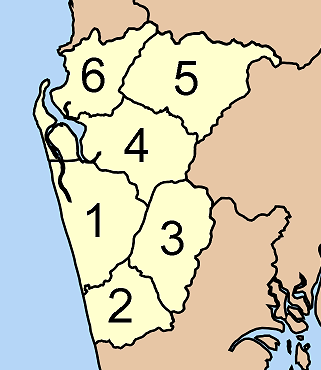

== See also ==
- Khao Lampi-Hat Thai Mueang National Park
