= Yongyoot Thongkongtoon =

Thai film director, producer, and screenwriter

- ยงยุทธ ทองกองทุน
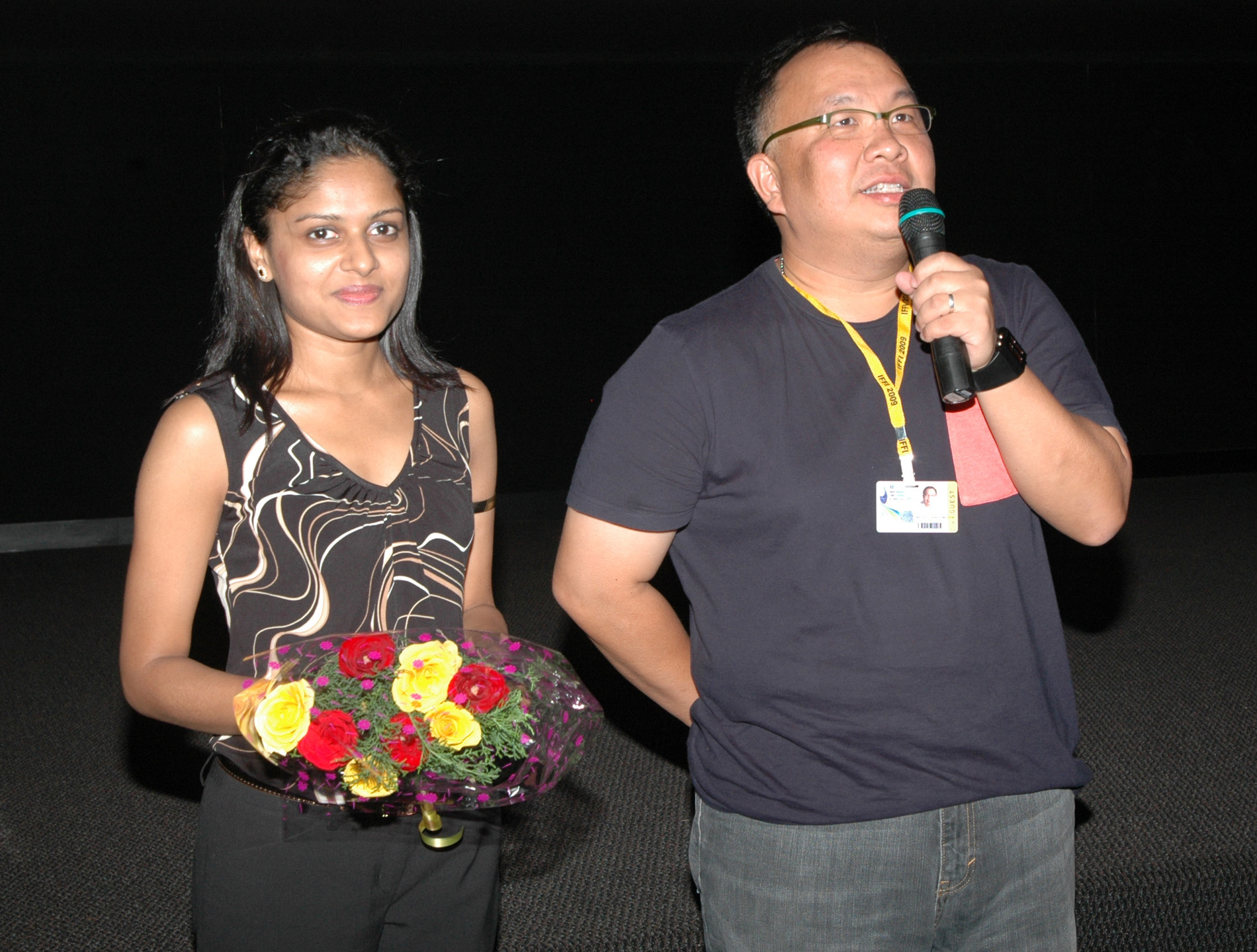
- Yongyoot at IFFI-2009
- Born: 18 February 1967 (age 59); Thailand
- Education: Chulalongkorn University
- Occupations: Film director; screenwriter; producer
- Notable work: The Iron Ladies

Yongyoot Thongkongtoon (Thai: ยงยุทธ ทองกองทุน; born February 18, 1967) is a Thai film director, producer, and screenwriter. He made his debut in 2000 with the sports comedy The Iron Ladies.

== Biography ==
Yongyoot Thongkongtoon graduated from Chulalongkorn University, with a bachelor's degree in Communication Arts (Broadcasting), in Bangkok.

His debut feature in 2000 was The Iron Ladies, a fact-based sports comedy about a volleyball team of gay and transgender men. The film won several awards in Thailand and at film festivals, including the Thailand National Film Association Awards and a special mention Teddy Award at the 2001 Berlin Film Festival. Yongyoot also directed the sequel, The Iron Ladies 2, in 2003.

In 2004, he directed Maid a spy spoof in which maids are recruited for a top-secret government intelligence agency. It was his first release under the new studio GTH, formed by the merger of GMM Grammy's GMM Pictures, producer Visute Poolvoralaks' Tai Entertainment and producer-director Jira Maligool's Hub Ho Hin production company.

This was followed by the 2006 romantic comedy-drama Metrosexual, about a group of women trying to figure out if the fiancé of one of their friends is a closeted gay.

In 2008, he took a change in direction away from comedy to direct a segment of the horror portmanteau 4bia. The film, also featuring segments by Paween Purijitpanya, Banjong Pisanthanakun and Parkpoom Wongpoom, won the bronze audience award at the 2008 Fantasia Festival in Montreal. The film also won a bronze audience award at the Toronto After Dark Film Festival that same year.

His next feature in 2009 marked another change in direction to romantic drama with Best of Times, which was Thailand's submission to the 82nd Academy Awards.

He said his difficult experience working with the horror and anxiety of 4bia prompted him to move toward drama. "I present serious issues as bitter pills coated with caramel," the director told Daily Xpress. "This movie looks how you move on with your life after you've failed. This time, I've chosen not to dilute what I want to say with comedy."

Yongyoot had intended on participating in the 4bia sequel Phobia 2, but a car wreck during production of Best of Times left him seriously injured. His segment was taken over by producer Visute Poolvoralaks.

At GTH, he is the director of international marketing, and serves as a mentor to younger filmmakers in the company.

He is also president of the Thai Film Directors' Association and since 2008 has served as artistic director of the Bangkok International Film Festival, and was responsible for making sure all films shown in the festival had Thai subtitles.

In June 2021, Netflix appointed Thongkongtoon as Director of Content for Thailand. He was responsible for content acquisition and the production of Netflix local original films and series in Thailand.
