= The Amazing Race 14 =

Season of television series

- Season 14
- Region 1 DVD cover
- Presented by: Phil Keoghan
- No. of teams: 11
- Winners: Tammy & Victor Jih
- No. of legs: 11
- Distance traveled: 40,000 mi (64,000 km)
- No. of episodes: 12

Release
- Original network: CBS
- Original release: February 15 – May 10, 2009

Additional information
- Filming dates: October 31 – November 21, 2008

Series chronology
- ← Previous; Season 13 Next → Season 15

The Amazing Race 14 is the fourteenth season of the American reality competition show The Amazing Race. Hosted by Phil Keoghan, it featured eleven teams of two, each with a pre-existing relationship, competing in a race around the world to win US$1,000,000. This season visited three continents and nine countries and traveled over 40,000 miles (64,000 km) during eleven legs. Starting in Los Alamitos, California, racers traveled through Switzerland, Germany, Austria, Romania, Russia, India, Thailand, and China before returning to the United States and finishing in Maui. A new twist introduced in this season includes the Blind U-Turn, which a team could use anonymously. The season premiered on CBS on February 15, 2009, and concluded on May 10, 2009.

Siblings Tammy and Victor Jih were the winners of this season, while former cheerleaders Jaime Edmondson and Cara Rosenthal finished in second place, and mother and son Margie and Luke Adams finished in third place.

== Production ==
=== Development and filming ===
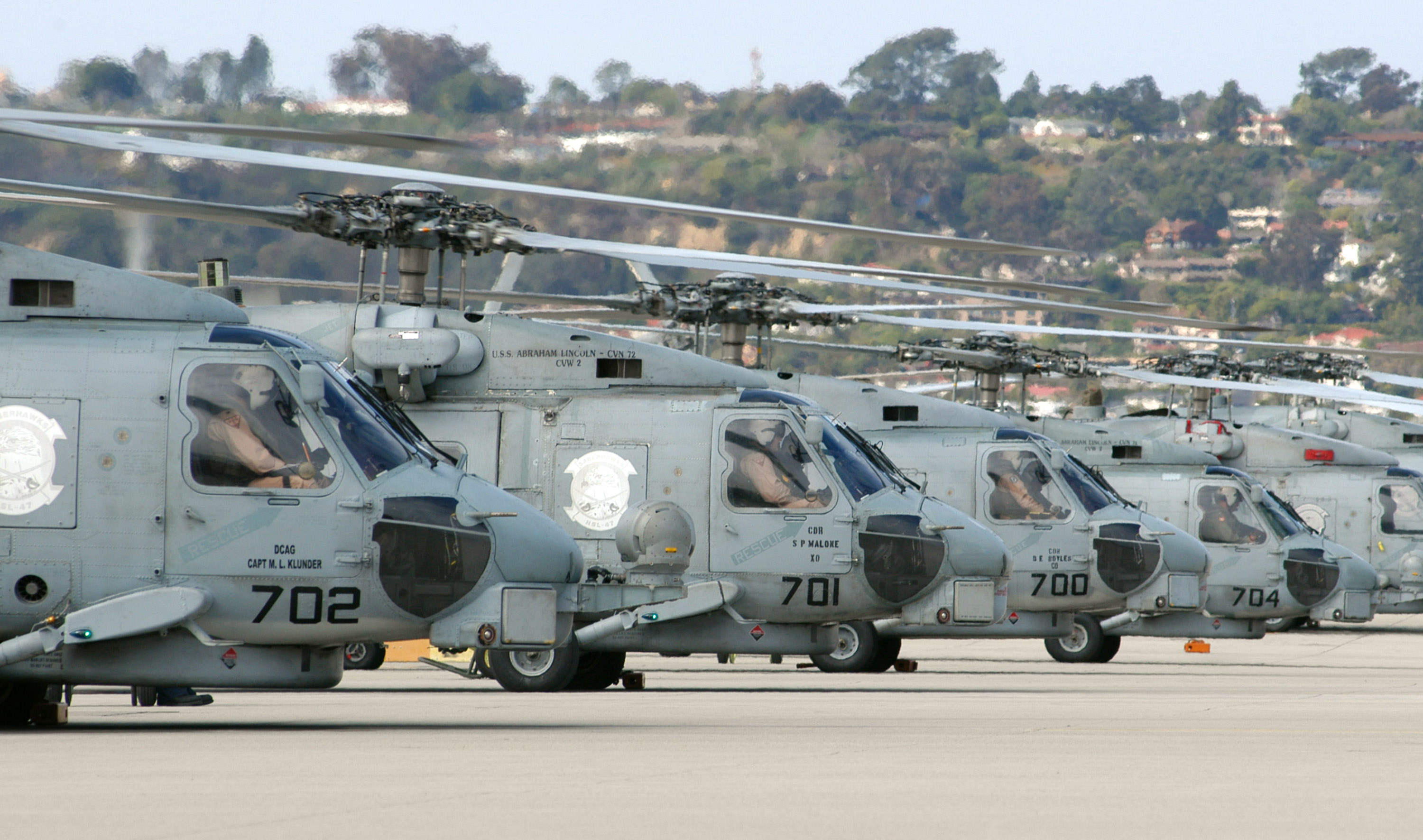
Teams were brought to the season's starting line at Los Alamitos Joint Forces Training Base in California by Seahawks.

The Amazing Race 14 lasted for 22 days and traveled over 40,000 miles (64,000 km). The teams raced in nine countries, including Romania and the Russian region of Siberia for the first time. In an interview, executive producer Bertram van Munster revealed that the teams took a 13-hour train ride on the Trans-Siberian Railway and got into a Siberian snowstorm with below-zero temperatures. He also revealed that the teams suffered extreme climates, intense Roadblocks, and less time in airports, which added up to an exhausting course for the racers. In addition, CBS revealed the season included the world's second tallest bungee jump, suffocating heat in India, and an Olympic-themed challenge that left the teams "gasping for air."

The show's route map was updated via Google Earth, and according to van Munster prior to the show's debut, the season included new graphics, a new opening sequence, and a tuneup in the musical score, as well as the use of a split screen to show several scenes at the same time.

Season 14 introduced a new twist to the U-Turn: the Blind U-Turn, in which a team could use it anonymously. Other U-Turns required teams to acknowledge their use to subsequent teams.

Leg 10 was a double-length leg: a surprise feature of every season from season 6 to season 10. However, this double-length leg was the first where it was revealed to the teams at a location that was explicitly called a Pit Stop, but teams were not warned of an elimination in the clue. After checking in, teams were told "this leg of the race is not over" and were given a clue by Phil Keoghan to continue racing. This was the last season to feature a double-length leg until season 32, where it was renamed the mega leg.

== Contestants ==
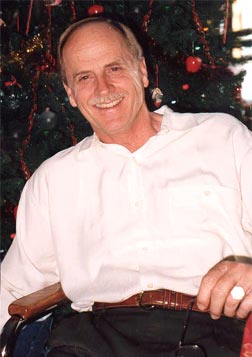
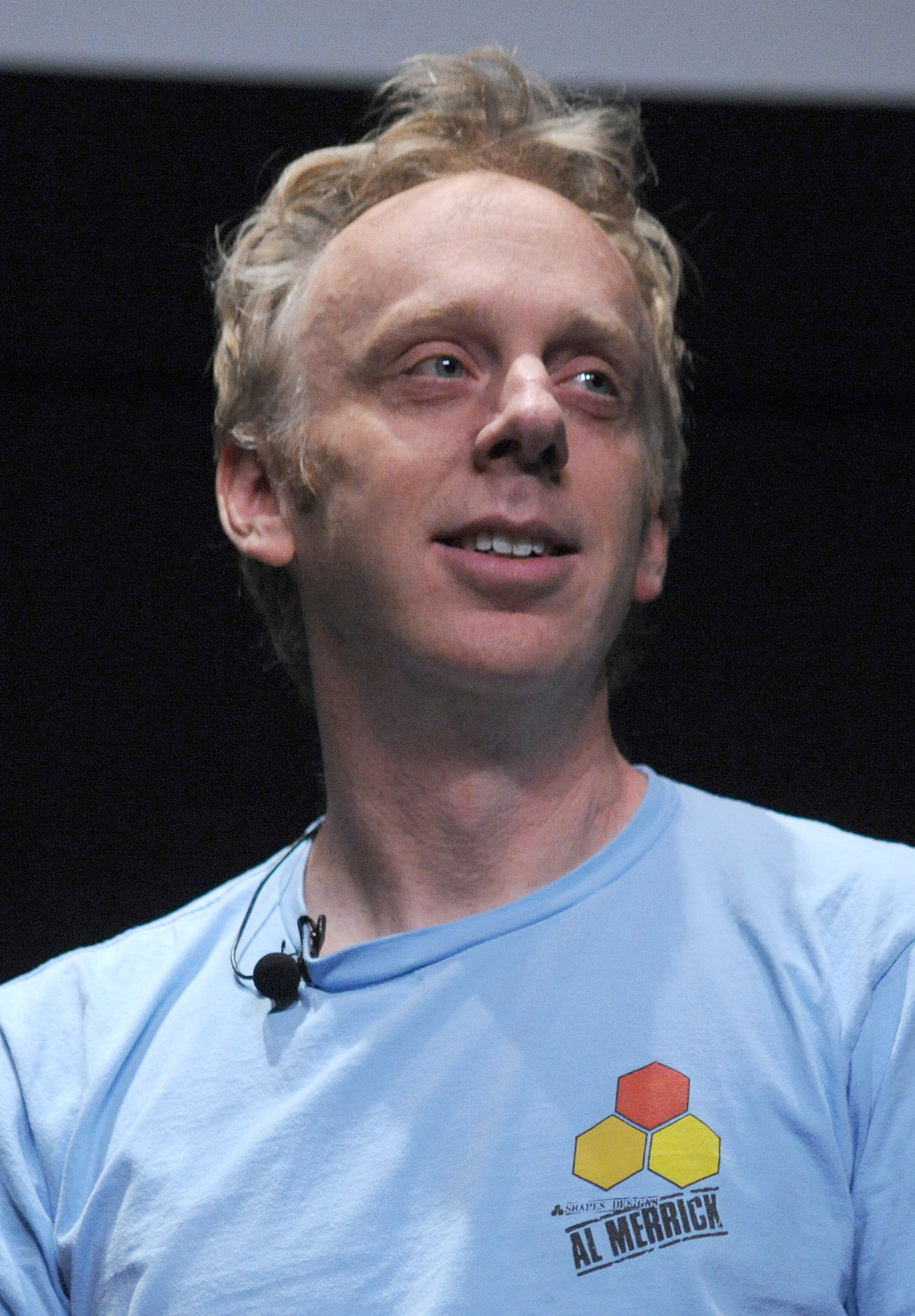
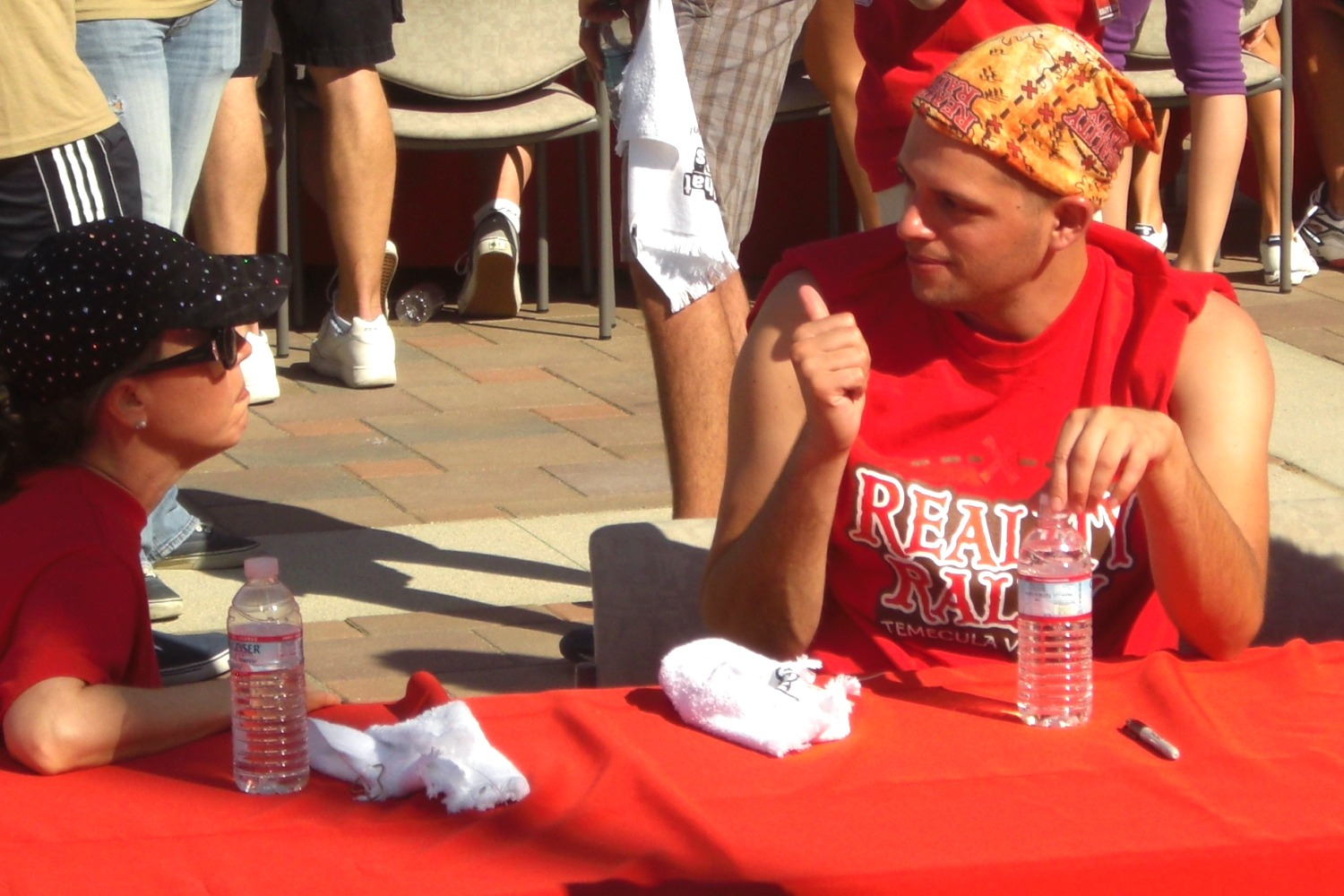
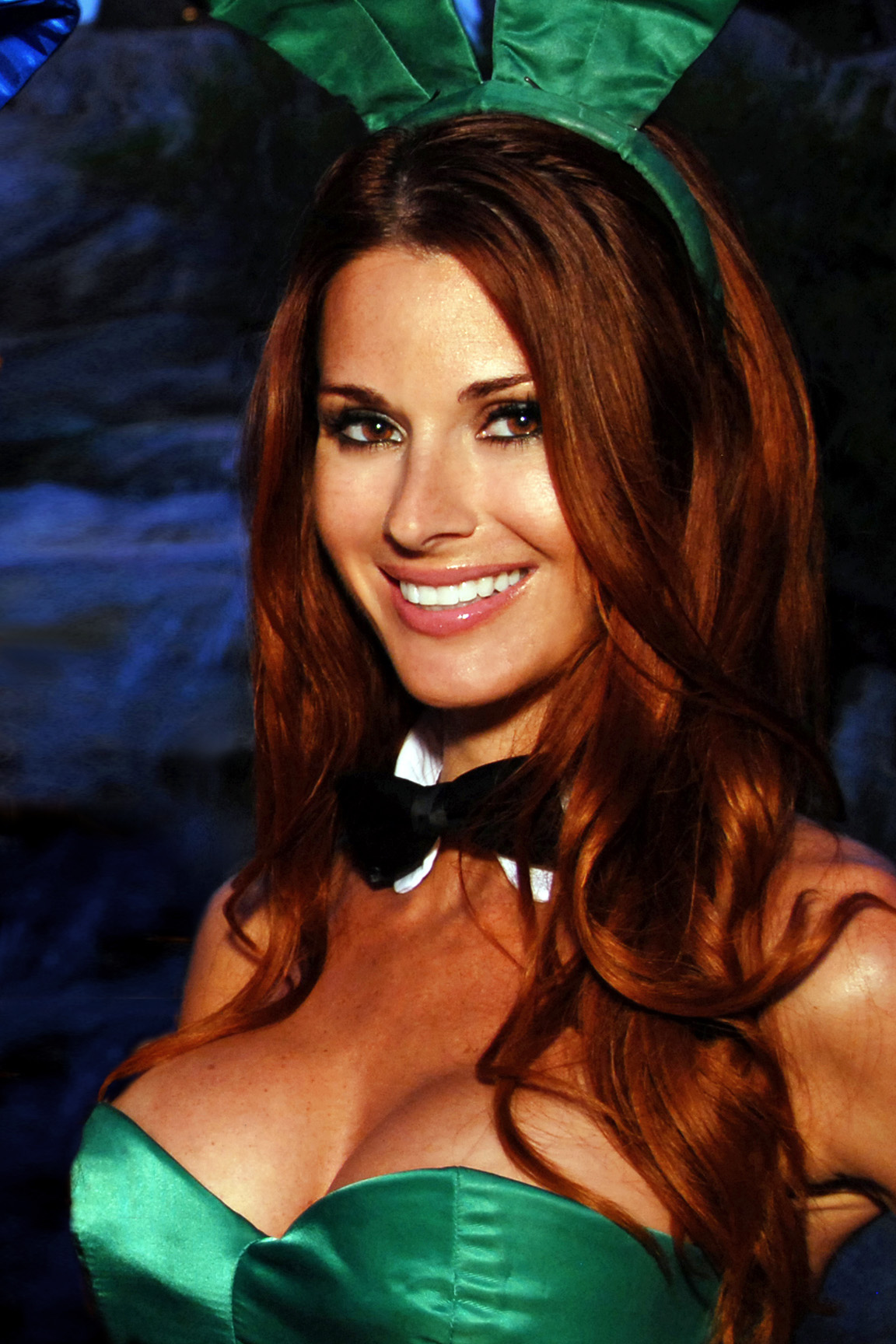
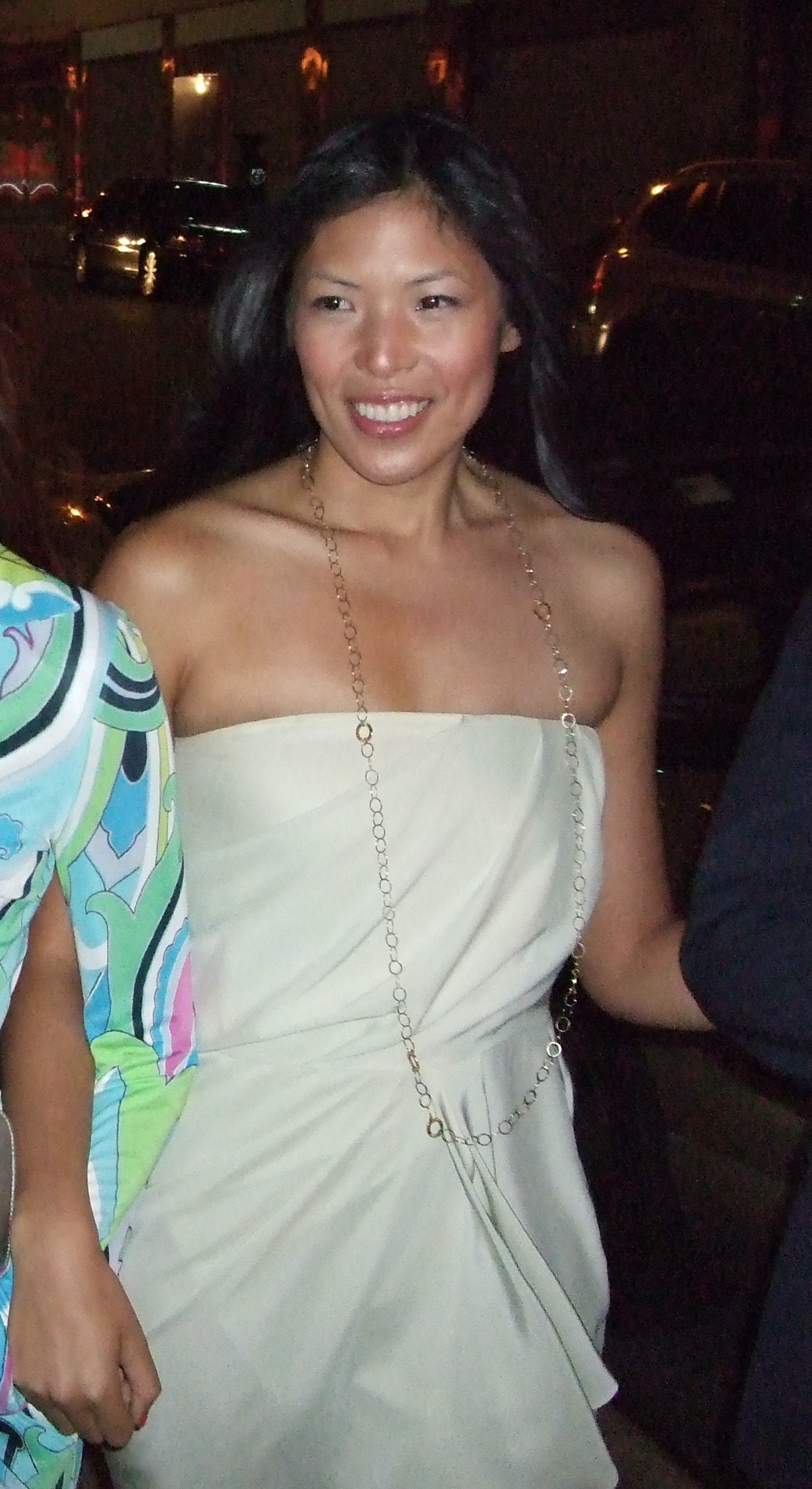
From left to right: Mel White, Mike White, Margie Adams, Luke Adams, Jaime Edmondson, and Tammy Jih

Luke Adams, was the first deaf contestant in the American series and relied on his mother to communicate in the competition. Margie & Luke had originally applied to be on The Amazing Race: Family Edition (along with two other family members), but ended up being one of the last families cut. Mike White had originally been chosen to participate on The Amazing Race 13 with director Jon Kasdan, but he later dropped out before filming. The show's casting director wanted White for season 14 and he was ultimately paired with his father.

After this season, Jodi Wincheski began working as a casting producer for both The Amazing Race and Survivor.

Contestants	Age	Relationship	Hometown	Status
Preston McCamy	28	Dating	Columbia, South Carolina	Eliminated 1st (in Stechelberg, Switzerland)
Jennifer Hopka	26	Dating	Columbia, South Carolina	Eliminated 1st (in Stechelberg, Switzerland)
Steve Cole	43	Married	Martinsville, Virginia	Eliminated 2nd (in Salzburg, Austria)
Linda Cole	52	Married	Martinsville, Virginia	Eliminated 2nd (in Salzburg, Austria)
Brad Hunt	52	Married	Columbus, Ohio	Eliminated 3rd (in Bran, Romania)
Victoria Hunt	47	Married	Columbus, Ohio	Eliminated 3rd (in Bran, Romania)
Amanda Blackledge	23	Dating	San Diego, California	Eliminated 4th (in Krasnoyarsk, Russia)
Kris Klicka	24	Dating	San Diego, California	Eliminated 4th (in Krasnoyarsk, Russia)
Christie Volkmer	37	Flight Attendants	Choctaw, Oklahoma	Eliminated 5th (in Jaipur, India)
Jodi Wincheski	40	Flight Attendants	Houston, Texas	Eliminated 5th (in Jaipur, India)
Mel White	68	Father & Son	Lynchburg, Virginia	Eliminated 6th (in Phuket, Thailand)
Mike White	38	Father & Son	Santa Monica, California	Eliminated 6th (in Phuket, Thailand)
Mark Munoz	48	Brothers & Stuntmen	Los Angeles, California	Eliminated 7th (in Guilin, China)
Michael Munoz	51	Brothers & Stuntmen	Maui, Hawaii	Eliminated 7th (in Guilin, China)
Kisha Hoffman	28	Sisters	The Bronx, New York	Eliminated 8th (in Beijing, China)
Jen Hoffman	24	Sisters	Louisville, Kentucky	Eliminated 8th (in Beijing, China)
Margie Adams	50	Mother & Son	Denver, Colorado	Third place
Luke Adams	22	Mother & Son	Denver, Colorado	Third place
Jaime Edmondson	29	Former NFL Cheerleaders	Fort Lauderdale, Florida	Runners-up
Cara Rosenthal	26	Former NFL Cheerleaders	Boca Raton, Florida	Runners-up
Tammy Jih	26	Siblings & Lawyers	San Francisco, California	Winners
Victor Jih	35	Siblings & Lawyers	Los Angeles, California	Winners

Future appearances

Amanda & Kris, Mel & Mike, Kisha & Jen, Margie & Luke, and Jaime & Cara raced again in The Amazing Race: Unfinished Business. Margie & Luke also competed in the second All-Star edition.

Outside of The Amazing Race, Jaime Edmondson appeared on The Girls Next Door and The Girls Next Door: The Bunny House. Victoria Hunt appeared on the TLC reality show Extreme Cheapskates in 2012. Mike White later competed on Survivor: David vs. Goliath. In 2026, Mike White competed on Survivor 50: In the Hands of the Fans. In 2026, Victor Jih competed on the sixth season of The Floor.

== Results ==
The following teams are listed with their placements in each leg. Placements are listed in finishing order.

- A red placement with a dagger (†) indicates that the team was eliminated.
- An underlined blue placement with a double-dagger (‡) indicates that the team was the last to arrive at a Pit Stop in a non-elimination leg, and had to perform a Speed Bump task in the following leg.
- An italicized placement indicates a team's placement at the midpoint of a double leg.
- A brown ⊃ indicates that the team used the U-Turn; a brown ⊂ indicates the team on the receiving end of the U-Turn.

Team placement (by leg)
Team	1	2	3	4	5	6	7	8	9	10a (Note: This was a double leg with two Detours and two Roadblocks shown over two episodes. The placements listed in the first half are the order of the teams' arrival at the Drum Tower in Beijing.)	10b	11
Tammy & Victor	2nd	1st	8th	3rd	2nd	1st	1st	3rd	2nd	3rd	1st⊃ (Note: Tammy & Victor chose to use the U-Turn on Kisha & Jen.)	1st
Jaime & Cara	7th	6th	7th	5th	3rd	5th	2nd	2nd	4th	1st	3rd	2nd
Margie & Luke	1st	4th	4th	4th⊃ (Note: Margie & Luke chose to use the U-Turn on Amanda & Kris.)	1st	4th	4th	1st	3rd	2nd	2nd	3rd
Kisha & Jen	8th	7th	3rd	2nd	6th	3rd	5th	4th (Note: Kisha & Jen initially arrived 3rd, but could not check in because they had left their travel documents and money at the Roadblock. They had to retrieve them before they could check in. Tammy & Victor checked in during this time, dropping Kisha & Jen to 4th.)	1st	4th	4th†⊂	
Mark & Michael	3rd	8th	5th	7th	5th	6th	3rd (Note: Mark & Michael initially arrived 1st, but were issued two 30-minute penalties: one for intentionally tampering with the bike pumps at the Detour and the other for hiring a taxi to guide them through the task, which was explicitly prohibited in the clue. Tammy & Victor and Jaime & Cara checked in during this penalty time, dropping Mark & Michael to 3rd.)	5th‡ (Note: Mark & Michael initially arrived 4th, but were issued two 2-hour penalties, both for "using personal belongings to settle a bill." Kisha & Jen checked in during this penalty time, dropping them to last.)	5th†			
Mel & Mike	4th	2nd	1st	6th	4th	2nd	6th†					
Christie & Jodi	10th	9th	6th	1st	7th‡	7th†						
Amanda & Kris	5th	3rd	2nd	8th†⊂								
Brad & Victoria	6th	5th	9th†									
Steve & Linda	9th	10th†										
Preston & Jennifer	11th†											

== Race summary ==
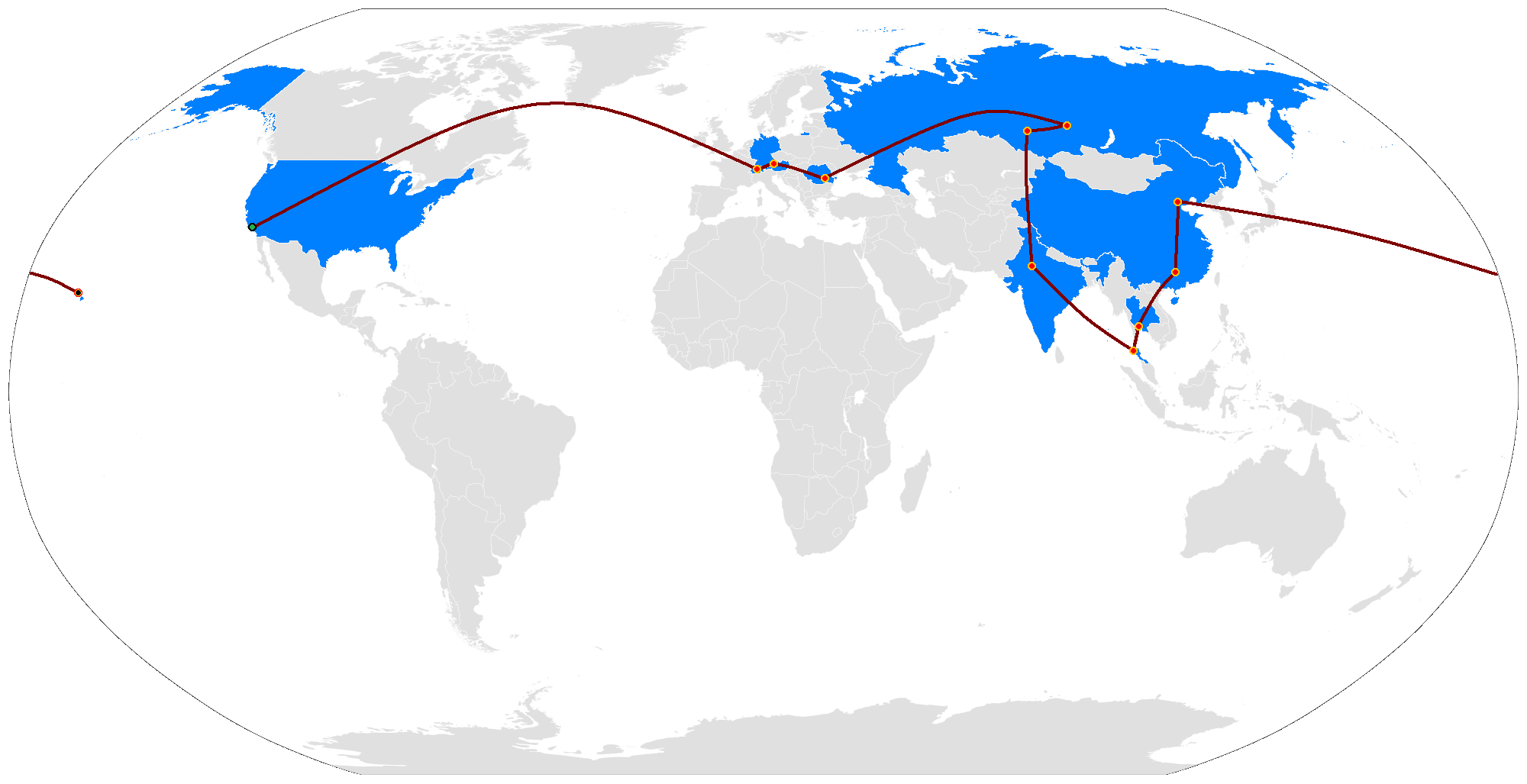
The route of The Amazing Race 14.

Destinations	Air travel Rail travel Water travel Bus travel Helicopter travel Bicycle travel Gondola travel
Route Markers	Detour Roadblock U-Turn Speed Bump Pit Stop

=== Leg 1 (United States → Switzerland) ===
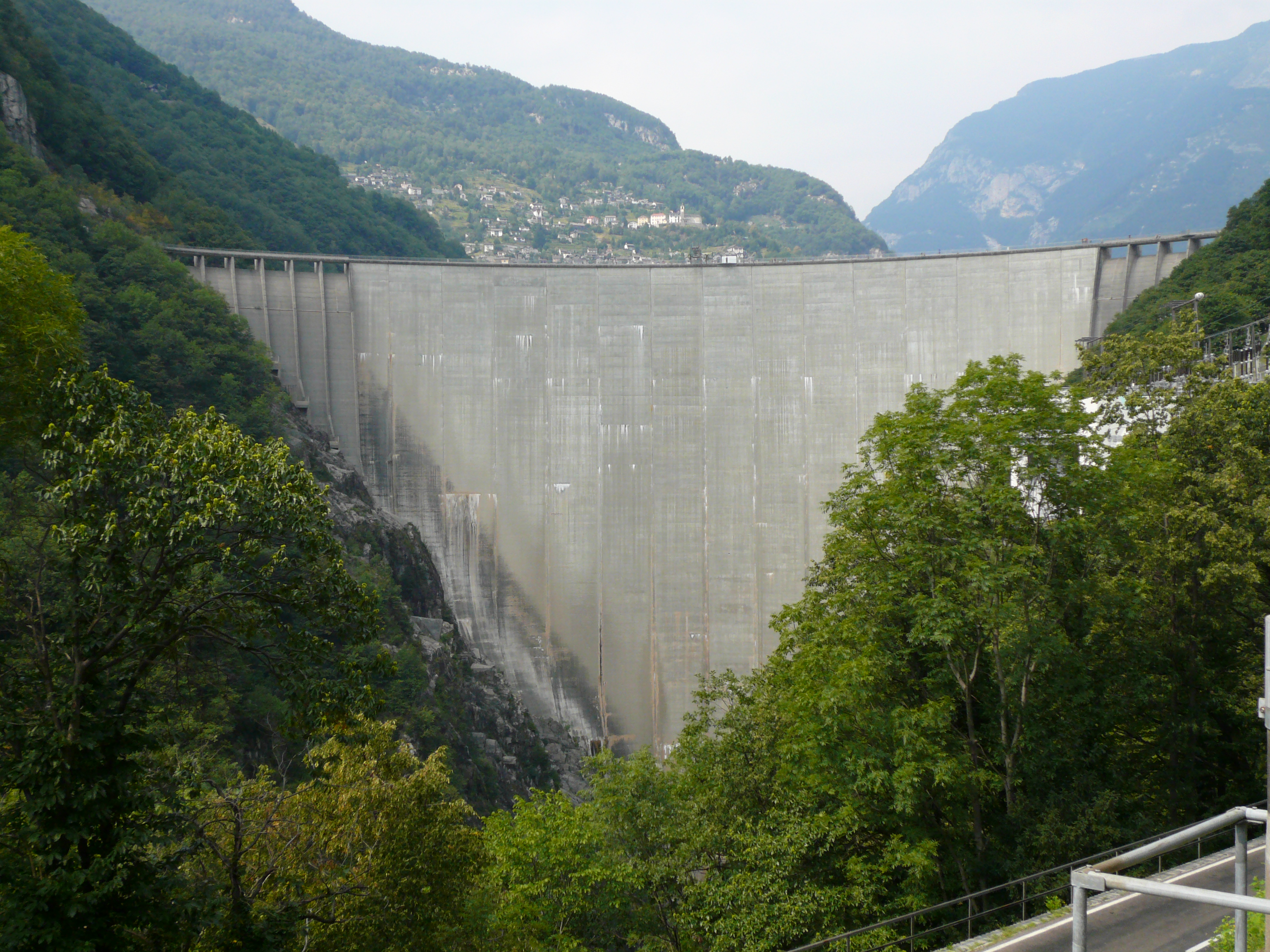
While in Switzerland, teams traveled to the Verzasca Dam near Locarno and performed the second-highest bungee jump in the world.

- Episode 1: "Don't Let a Cheese Hit Me" (February 15, 2009)
- Prize: A trip for two to Puerto Vallarta, Mexico (awarded to Margie & Luke)
- Eliminated: Preston & Jennifer

Locations

- Los Alamitos, California (Los Alamitos Joint Forces Training Base) (Starting Line)
- Los Angeles → Zürich, Switzerland or Milan, Italy
- Zürich or Milan → Locarno, Switzerland
- Locarno (Church of Sant'Antonio)
- Tenero-Contra (Verzasca Dam)
- Locarno → Interlaken
- Interlaken (Kleine Rugen Wiese)
- Stechelberg (Hotel Stechelberg)
- Stechelberg (Alpenhof Stechelberg)

Episode summary

- Teams set off from the Los Alamitos Joint Forces Training Base and drove themselves to Los Angeles International Airport, where they had to book one of two flights: the first flight carried six teams and flew to Zürich, Switzerland, while the second flight departed 25 minutes later and flew to Milan, Italy. After arriving in either Zürich or Milan, teams had to travel by train to Locarno, Switzerland. Once there, teams had to find the Church of Sant'Antonio, where they signed up for one of three departure times the next morning. In the morning, teams were given a picture and had to figure out that their next clue was located at the Verzasca Dam.
- In this season's first Roadblock, one team member had to bungee jump off the Verzasca Dam in order to receive their next clue.
- After the Roadblock, teams had to travel by train to Interlaken and then travel to the Kleine Rugen Wiese. There, teams had to transport four 50-pound (23 kg) wheels of cheese from a shed to the bottom of a hill using traditional cheese carriers and then properly stack the wheels in order to receive their next clue. Teams then had to travel to the Hotel Stechelberg and listen for a group of yodelers, who led them to the nearby Pit Stop.

Additional notes

- The cheese-moving task was later revisited in season 22 as a Switchback.
- The bungee jump off the Verzasca Dam was also revisited in season 33 as a Switchback.

=== Leg 2 (Switzerland → Germany → Austria) ===
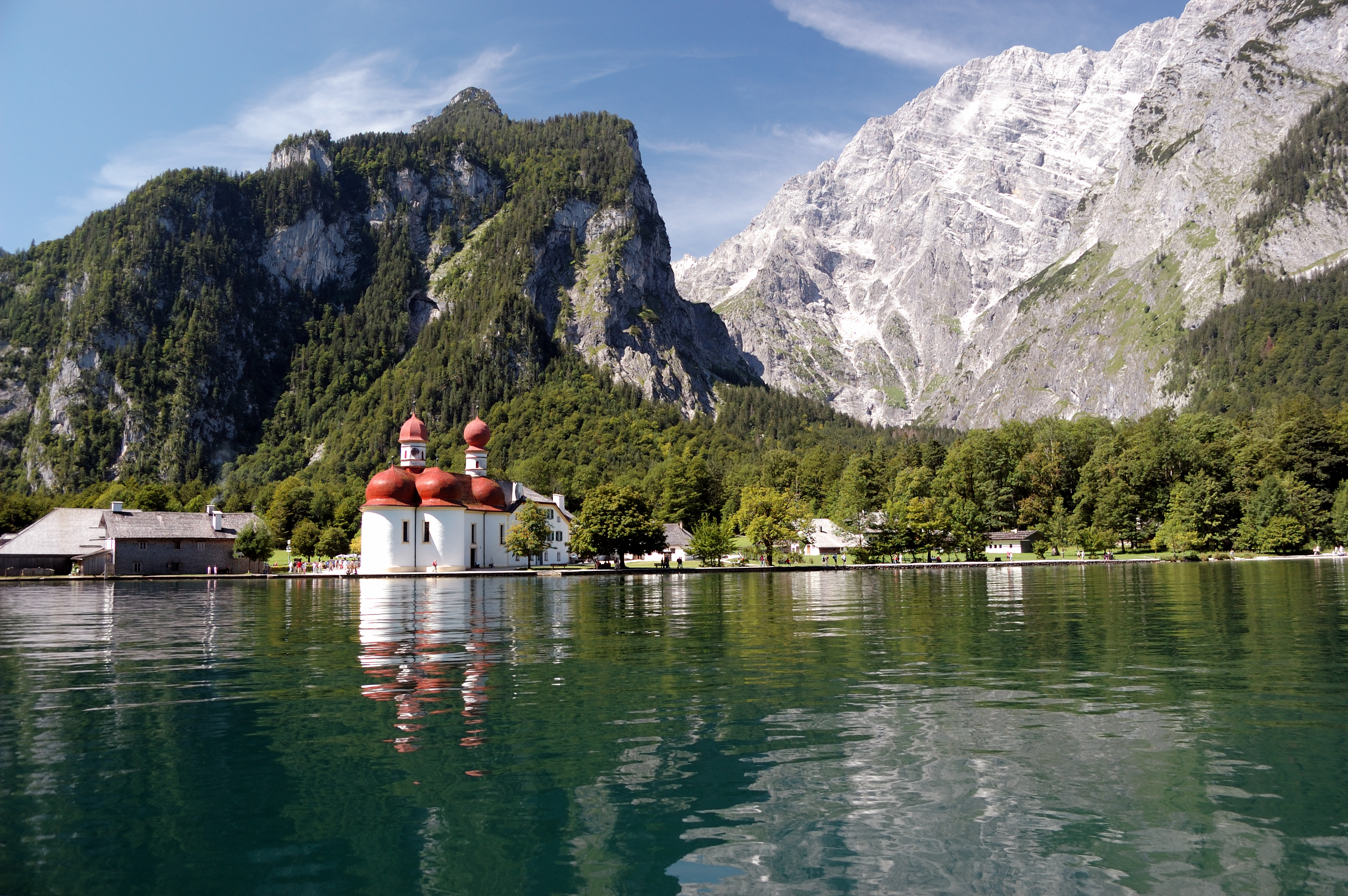
While in Germany, teams visited the lake town of Schönau am Königsee deep in the Bavarian Alps.

- Episode 2: "Your Target is Your Partner's Face" (February 22, 2009)
- Prize: A hybrid go-kart for each team member (awarded to Tammy & Victor)
- Eliminated: Steve & Linda

Locations

- Stechelberg (Alpenhof Stechelberg)
- Zürich → Munich, Germany
- Ruhpolding (Rauschberg)
- Schönau am Königssee (Bobsled Track)
- Schönau am Königssee (Holzsäger)
- Salzburg, Austria (Schloss Hellbrunn)

Episode summary

- At the start of this leg, teams were instructed to fly to Munich, Germany. Once there, they had to drive to the village of Ruhpolding and ride a cable car to the Rauschberg, where they found their next clue.
- In this leg's Roadblock, one team member had to tandem paraglide with an instructor off a mountain 6,000 feet (1,800 m) to a landing area below, where their partner waited with their next clue. In the event of unfavorable winds, they had to choose between waiting an indeterminate amount of time for better conditions or taking a 60-minute hike down the mountain.
- After the Roadblock, teams had to drive to Schönau am Königssee and find the bobsled track.
- This season's first Detour was a choice between Balancing Dolly or Austrian Folly. In Balancing Dolly, both team members had to navigate Segways over a two-mile (3.2 km) road obstacle course in order to receive their next clue. In Austrian Folly, teams had to enter a party tent and throw Bavarian pies at their partner's face. They had to take turns smacking each other in the face until they found a pie with cherry filling in order to receive their next clue.
- After the Detour, teams had to find the Holzsäger, a woodcutting workshop, and wait for the mechanical Tyrolean woodcutters to cut a piece of wood, which was stamped with the location of the Pit Stop: Schloss Hellbrunn in Salzburg, Austria.

=== Leg 3 (Austria → Germany → Romania) ===
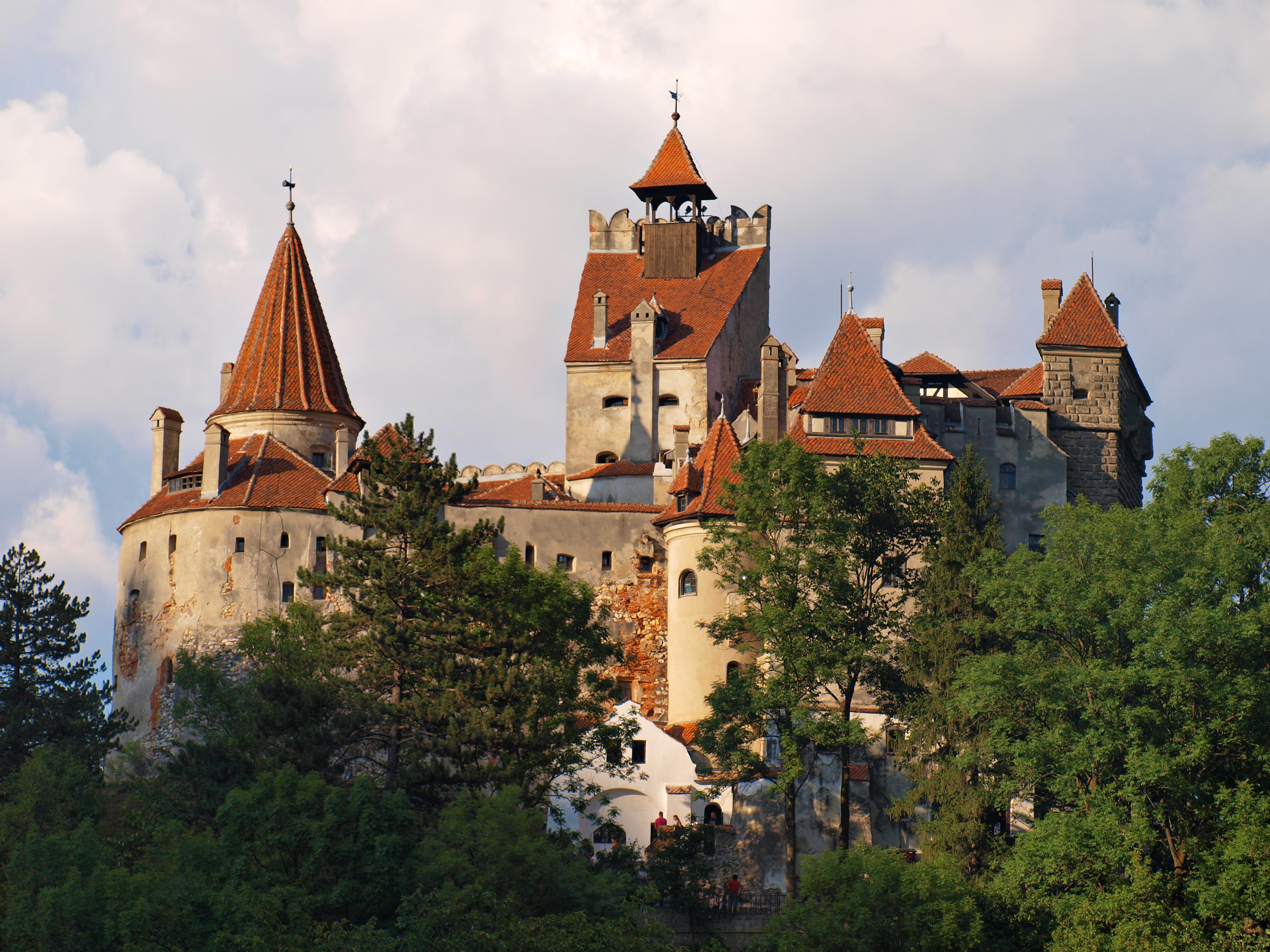
Teams ended the leg in the shadow of Bran Castle in Transylvania, the fabled home of Dracula.

- Episode 3: "I'm Not Wearing That Girl's Leotard!" (March 1, 2009)
- Prize: A trip for two to Manuel Antonio National Park in Costa Rica (awarded to Mel & Mike)
- Eliminated: Brad & Victoria

Locations

- Salzburg (Sound of Music Pavilion)
- Salzburg → Munich, Germany
- Munich → Bucharest, Romania
- Bucharest (Lia Manoliu National Sports Complex)
- Bucharest → Brașov
- Brașov (Biserica Neagră)
- Bran (Vila Panoramic)

Episode summary

- At the start of this leg, teams were instructed to travel by train back to Munich, Germany, and then fly to Bucharest, Romania. Once there, teams had to travel to the Lia Manoliu National Sports Complex in order to find their next clue.
- In this leg's Roadblock, one team member had to complete a series of moves in three gymnastics disciplines – the balance beam, the parallel bars, and floor exercises – in order to receive their next clue.
- After the Roadblock, teams had to travel by train to Brașov and then find their next clue at the Biserica Neagră.
- This leg's Detour was a choice between Gypsy Moves or Vampire Remains. In Gypsy Moves, teams traveled to a Romani encampment and helped a family move from one camp to another by loading their belongings onto a traditional horse-drawn cart and unloading them at their new camp in order to receive their next clue. In Vampire Remains, teams had to drag a chained coffin to a field of stakes in the shadow of Bran Castle. There, they had to undo the coffin's chains and found several antique frames which they then had to impale by smashing the stakes until they found one containing an Amazing Race flag, which they could trade for their next clue.
- After the Detour, teams had to check in at the Pit Stop: the Vila Panoramic, overlooking Bran Castle.

=== Leg 4 (Romania → Russia) ===
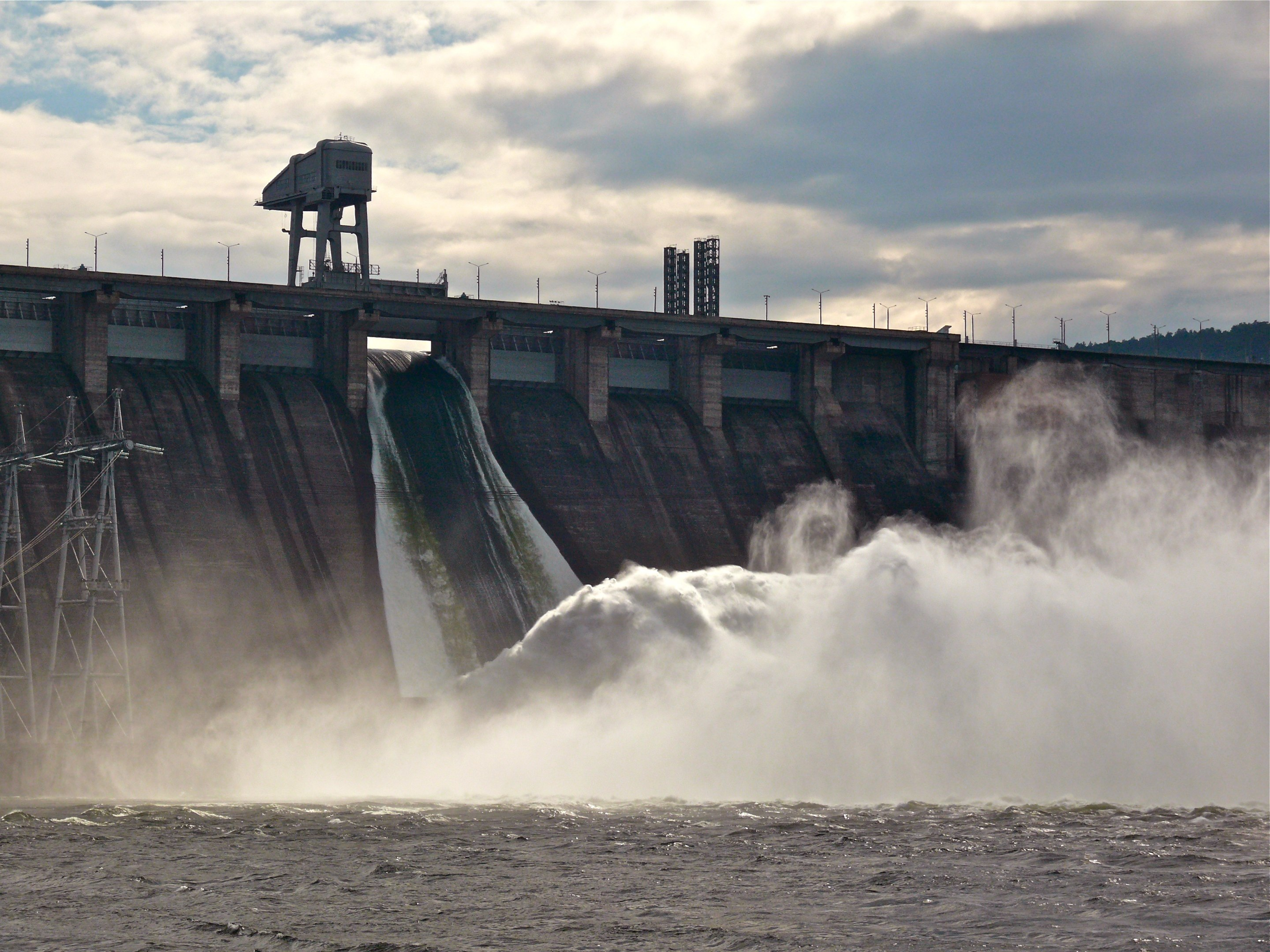
After arriving in Krasnoyarsk, Siberia, teams had to figure out that their next destination was the Krasnoyarsk Hydroelectric Dam.

- Episode 4: "It Was Like a Caravan of Idiots" (March 8, 2009)
- Prize: A motorcycle for each team member (awarded to Christie & Jodi)
- Eliminated: Amanda & Kris

Locations

- Bran (Vila Panoramic)
- Bucharest → Krasnoyarsk, Russia
- Divnogorsk (Krasnoyarsk Hydroelectric Dam)
- Ovsyanka Village (Church of Saint Innokenty)
- Ovsyanka Village (Museum of The Last Bow)
- Krasnoyarsk (Bobrovy Log Park)
- Krasnoyarsk (Krasnoyarsk Theater of Musical Comedy)

Episode summary

- At the start of this leg, teams were given a Russian ten-ruble banknote and were instructed to fly to Krasnoyarsk in Russian Siberia. Once there, teams had to figure out that their next location was depicted on the bill – the Krasnoyarsk Hydroelectric Dam – where teams found their next clue. Teams then had to travel to Church of Saint Innokenty in Ovsyanka Village.
- This leg's Detour was a choice between Stack or Construct. In Stack, teams had to properly stack wood in front of an existing stack in order to receive their next clue. If their stack collapsed into the existing one, they had to rebuild both. In Construct, teams had to travel to a workshop and assemble a window frame, which they had to install in a local house in order to receive their next clue.
- After the Detour, teams had to travel to the Museum of The Last Bow in order to find their next clue, which directed them to the Bobrovy Log Park in Krasnoyarsk.
- In this leg's Roadblock, one team member had to complete a three-mile (4.8 km) lap on a bobsled roller coaster with a speed of up to 55 miles per hour (89 km/h) in under four minutes while looking for seven letters scattered around the track. They then had to arrange the letters to spell the name of a famous Russian playwright – CHEKHOV – in order to receive their next clue directing them to the Pit Stop: the Krasnoyarsk Theater of Musical Comedy.

Additional note

- Margie & Luke chose to use the Blind U-Turn on Amanda & Kris.

=== Leg 5 (Russia) ===
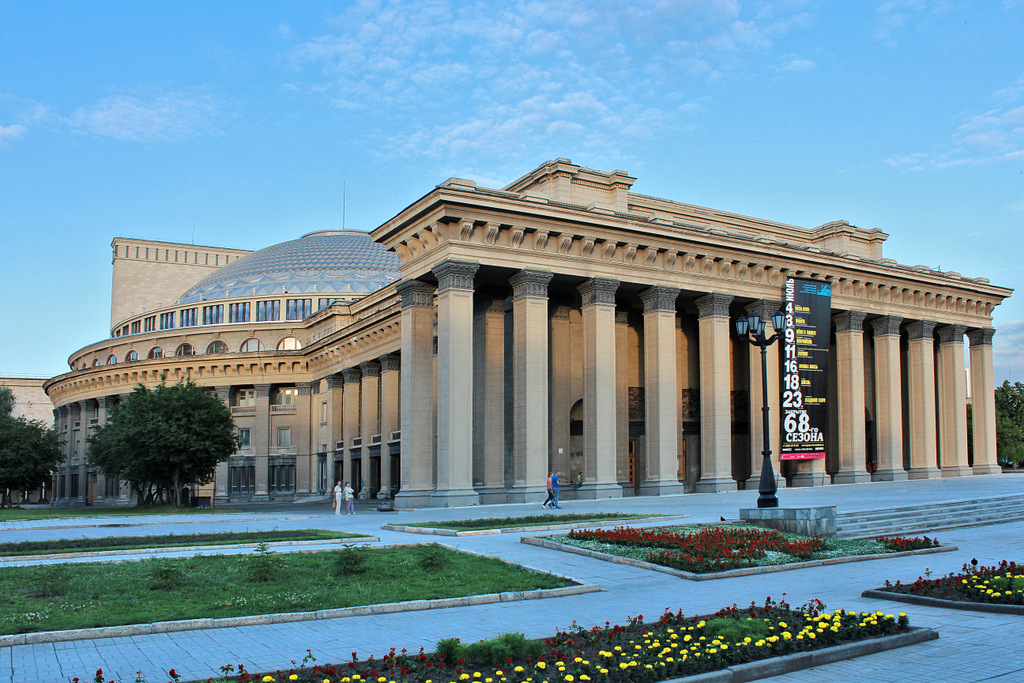
The Novosibirsk Opera and Ballet Theatre in the city of Novosibirsk was the fifth Pit Stop.

- Episode 5: "She's a Little Scared of Stick, But I Think She'll Be OK!" (March 15, 2009)
- Prize: A trip for two to Saint Lucia (awarded to Margie & Luke)

Locations

- Krasnoyarsk (Krasnoyarsk Theater of Musical Comedy)
- (Trans-Siberian Railway) Krasnoyarsk → Novosibirsk
- Novosibirsk (Punkt Tekhnicheskogo Osmotra)
- Novosibirsk (Komsomolskaya Street & Voznesensky Cathedral or Stadium Spartak)
- Novosibirsk (State Public Scientific & Technological Library)
- Novosibirsk (Novosibirsk Opera and Ballet Theatre)

Episode summary

- At the start of the leg, teams had to travel on the Trans-Siberian Railway to Novosibirsk. Once there, teams then had to travel to Punkt Tekhnicheskogo Osmotra in order to find their next clue.
- This leg's Detour was a choice between Russian Bride or Russian Snowplow. In Russian Bride, teams drove to a Soviet-era apartment on Komsomolskaya Street, fetched a bride, and then brought her to her groom at the Voznesensky Cathedral. Once the team had a picture taken with the couple, they received their next clue. In Russian Snowplow, teams drove to Stadium Spartak, where each team member took turns driving a snowplow through a marked course while being directed by their partner. When both team members completed the course, they received their next clue.
- After the Detour, teams had to drive to the State Public Scientific & Technological Library in order to find their next clue.
- In this leg's Roadblock, one team member had to choose two Russian marathon runners, who helped them warm up for ten minutes before they had to strip down to their underwear and run a 1.4-mile (2.3 km) course to the Pit Stop at the Novosibirsk Opera and Ballet Theatre, where their partner waited to join them.

Additional note

- This was a non-elimination leg.

=== Leg 6 (Russia → India) ===
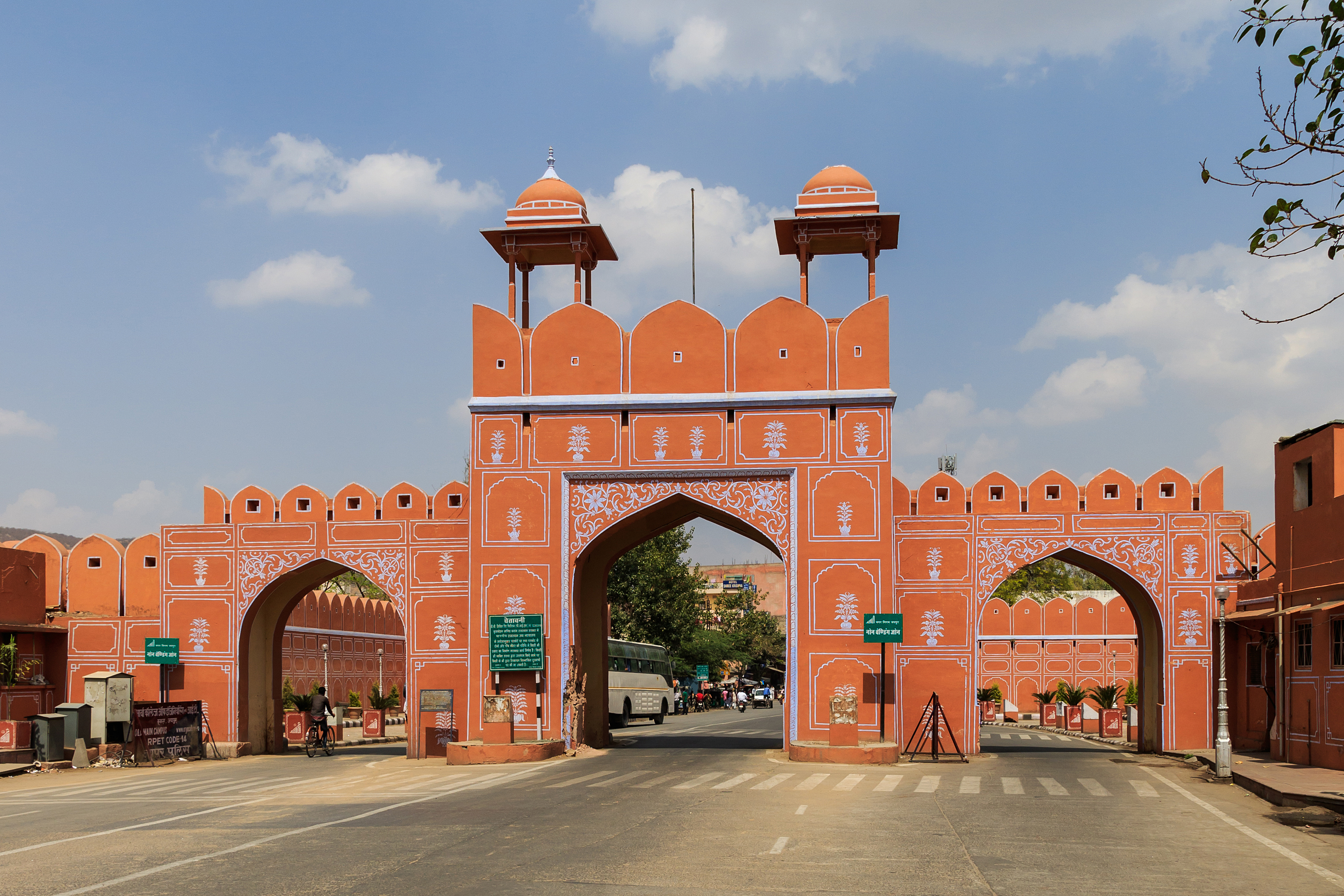
One of the Detour choices in Jaipur had teams transporting hay alongside its city wall, including the Zorawar Singh Gate.

- Episode 6: "Alright Guys We're at War!" (March 22, 2009)
- Prize: An ocean kayak for each team member (awarded to Tammy & Victor)
- Eliminated: Christie & Jodi

Locations

- Novosibirsk (Marins Park Hotel Novosibirsk)
- Novosibirsk → Jaipur, India
- Dhula Village (Peepli Ka Pedh)
- Amber (Amber Fort – Gaura Parvati Parking)
- Jaipur (Johari Bazar – Ramniwas Ramgopal Puppet Store)
- Jaipur (Kalla Hanuman Temple)
- Jaipur (Sanganeri Gate & Zorawar Singh Gate or Badi Chopar Intersection)
- Amber (Jaigarh Fort)

Episode summary

- At the start of this leg, teams were instructed to fly to Jaipur, India. Once there, teams had to travel to Peepli Ka Pedh in Dhula Village, where they had to pick up one of two telephones and call one of four provided telephone numbers. The person on the line then told teams the location of their next clue: Amber Fort.
- In this leg's Roadblock, one team member had to choose a group of camels and use traditional tools to load and carry a required amount of hay to the camels, as well as fill a trough with water, in order to receive their next clue.
- After the Roadblock, teams had to travel to the Ramniwas Ramgopal Puppet Store, where they found their next clue.
- For their Speed Bump, Christie & Jodi had to travel to Kala Hanuman Temple, where they had to decorate an elephant's face with various paints to the satisfaction of the mahout before they could continue racing.
- This leg's Detour was a choice between Movers or Shakers. In Movers, teams traveled to the Sanganeri Gate and had to choose two rickshaws loaded with barrels of hay. They then had to transport the hay 1.5 miles (2.4 km) along the city wall of Jaipur to the Zorawar Singh Gate, where they had to search through the hay for an elephant charm, which they could then trade for their next clue. In Shakers, teams traveled to the Badi Chopar junction, where they had to don traditional costumes, join a local dance troupe, and earn ₹100 (roughly $2) worth of tips. They had to give the money that they'd earned to the band leader in exchange for their next clue.
- After the Detour, teams had to check in at the Pit Stop: Jaigarh Fort.

=== Leg 7 (India → Thailand) ===
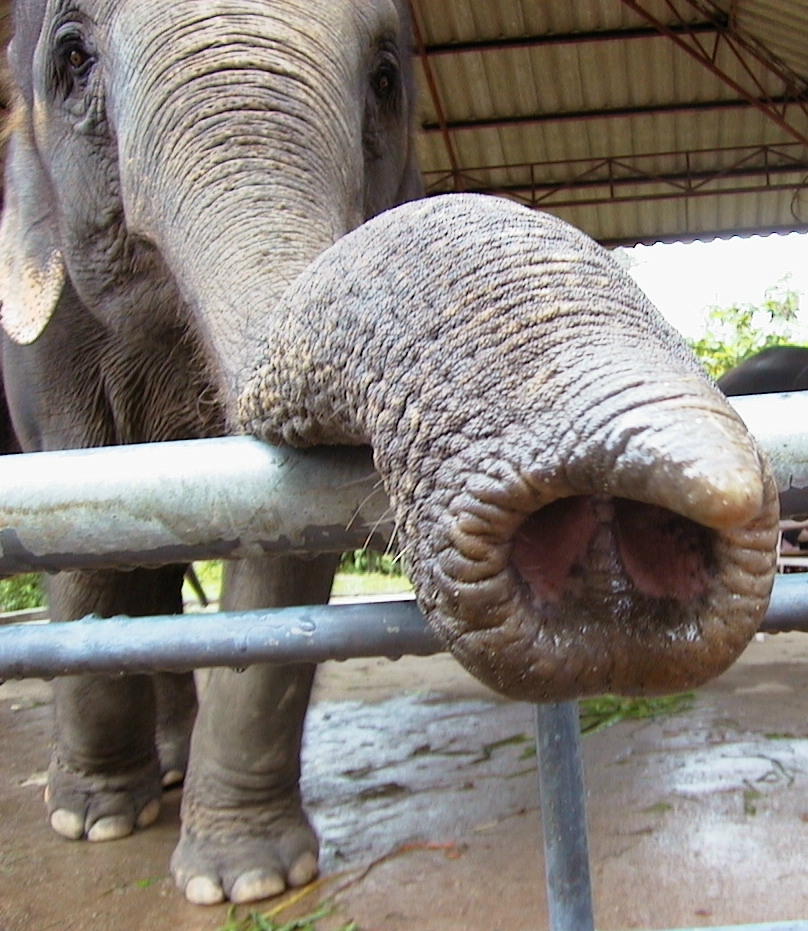
At the Phuket Zoo, teams had to participate in an elephant show.

- Episode 7: "Gorilla? Gorilla?? Gorilla???" (March 29, 2009)
- Prize: A trip for two to Oahu, Hawaii (awarded to Tammy & Victor)
- Eliminated: Mel & Mike

Locations

- Amber (Jaigarh Fort)
- Jaipur → Phuket, Thailand
- Phuket (Phuket Zoo)
- Phuket (Old Phuket – Nguan Choon Tong Herbs Shop)
- Phuket (Pae Yod or Wat Phutta Mongkhon Nimit & King Rama IX Park)
- Phuket (Wat Thep Nimit Temple)

Episode summary

- At the start of this leg, teams were instructed to fly to Phuket, Thailand. Once there, teams had to find their next clue using only a photograph of a gorilla statue, which they to figure out was located at the Phuket Zoo. At the zoo, teams found their clue and were instructed to take a picture with the zoo's mascot – Esso the tiger – and then participate in an elephant show. When the elephant show concluded, teams had to return to the tiger handler, who handed them their picture with their next clue.
- At the Nguan Choon Tong Herbs Shop in Old Phuket, teams had to direct the shopkeeper to open 99 boxes of herbs one at a time until they found the box that contained their next clue.
- This leg's Detour was a choice between 100 Barrels or 2 Miles. In 100 Barrels, teams had to travel to Pae Yod and prepare a fishing boat by filling 47 barrels with water and loading the other 53 barrels on the upper deck in order to receive their next clue. In 2 Miles, one team member had to pull a rickshaw carrying their partner two miles (3.2 km) from Wat Phutta Mongkhon Nimit to King Rama IX Park in order to find their next clue.
- After the Detour, teams had to check in at the Pit Stop: Wat Thep Nimit Temple.

Additional note

- Mel & Mike confirmed in a post-show interview that there was an unaired and unused Fast Forward on this leg that involved purchasing items for an orphanage.

=== Leg 8 (Thailand) ===
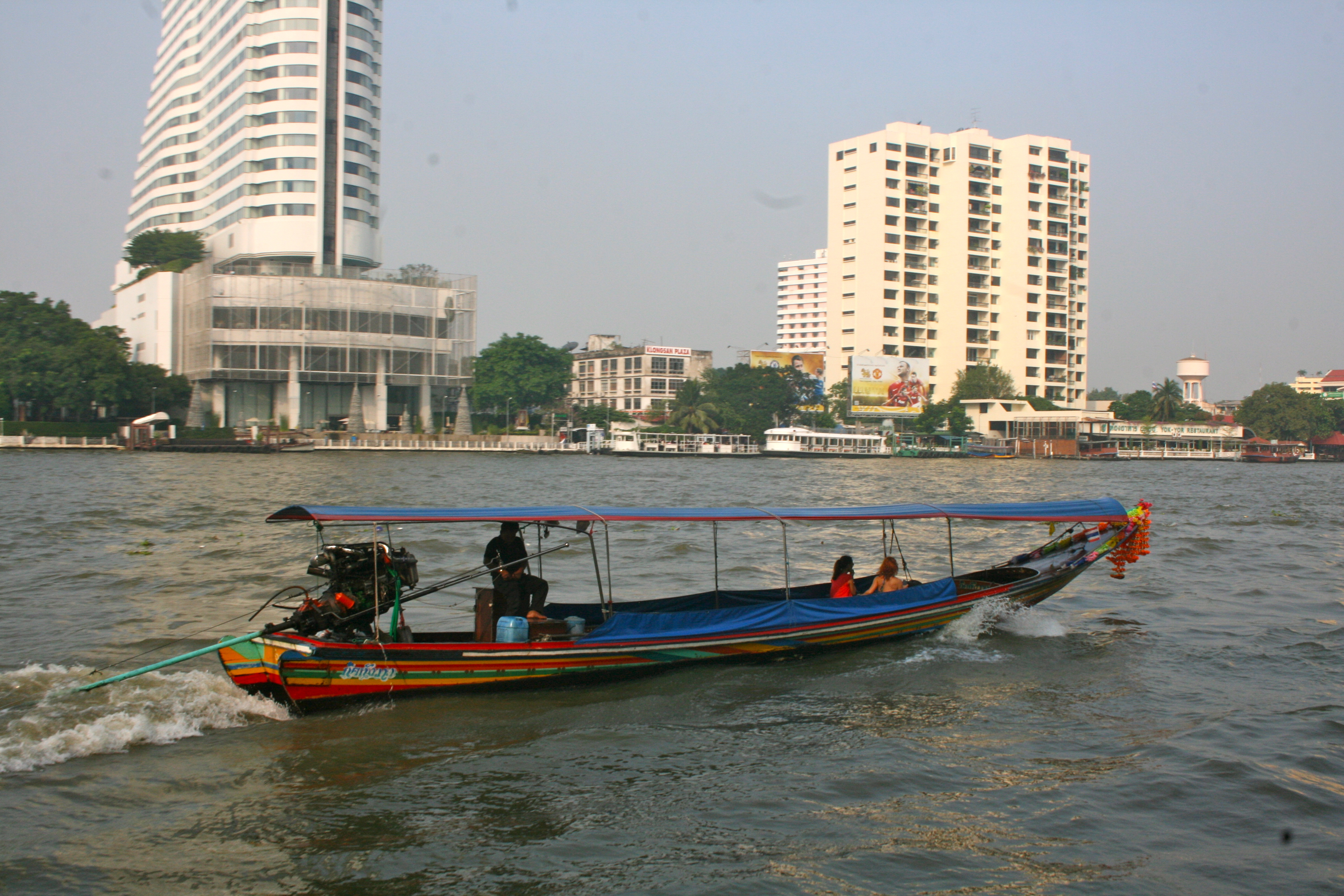
Teams traveled along Bangkok's series of canals using traditional Thai long-tail boats in this leg.

- Episode 8: "Rooting Around in People's Mouths Could Be Unpleasant" (April 12, 2009)
- Prize: A trip for two to San Juan, Puerto Rico (awarded to Margie & Luke)

Locations

- Phuket (Wat Thep Nimit Temple)
- Phuket → Bangkok
- Bangkok (Chareonyont 007 Boat Yard)
- Bangkok (Chao Phraya River – Peninsula Pier)
- Bangkok (Street of Happy Smiles or Wat Samphanthawong)
- Bangkok (Phaya Thai Palace)

Episode summary

- At the start of this leg, teams were instructed to fly to Bangkok, and then had to find their next clue at the Chareonyont 007 Boat Yard.
- In this leg's Roadblock, one team member had to properly attach a propeller to a traditional Thai long-tail boat in order to receive their next clue.
- After the Roadblock, teams had to navigate the waterways of Bangkok in their boat using a provided map in order to find the Peninsula Pier, where they found their next clue.
- This leg's Detour was a choice between Broken Teeth or Broken Record. In Broken Teeth, teams traveled to the "Street of Happy Smiles", where they had to search through 50 sets of dentures and match five patients with the correct set of dentures in order to receive their next clue. In Broken Record, teams had to travel to Wat Samphanthawong and choose a group of kathoeys and a party taxi. Teams then had to sing karaoke with the other travelers while the taxi driver drove them five miles (8 km) through the traffic of Bangkok's Chinatown until they returned to the temple, at which point, they could receive their next clue.
- After the Detour, teams had to check in at the Pit Stop: Phaya Thai Palace.

Additional note

- This was a non-elimination leg.

=== Leg 9 (Thailand → China) ===
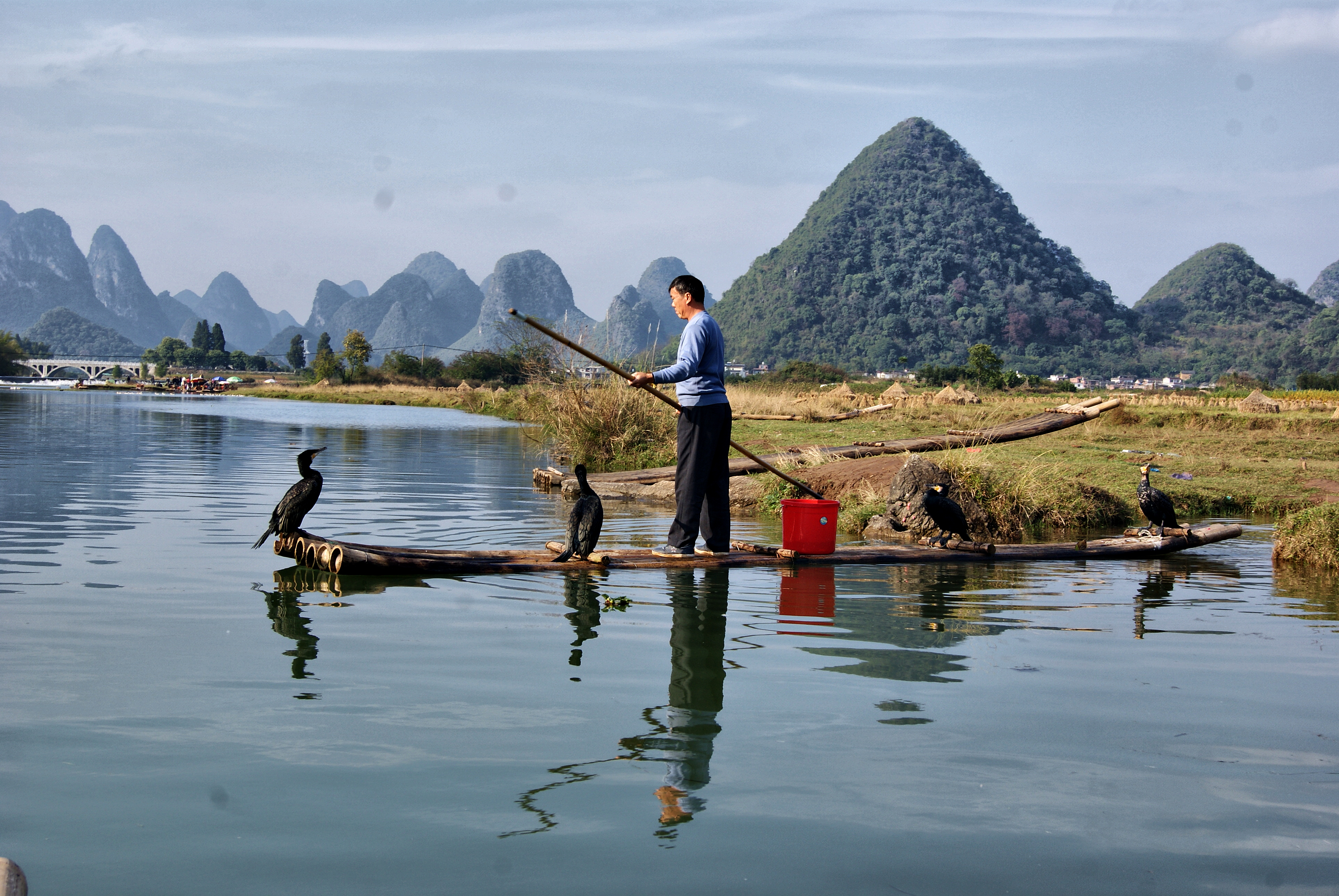
The Roadblock in Guilin introduced teams to the traditional Chinese method of cormorant fishing on the Li River.

- Episode 9: "Our Parents Will Cry Themselves to Death" (April 19, 2009)
- Prize: A trip for two to Barbados (awarded to Kisha & Jen)
- Eliminated: Mark & Michael

Locations

- Bangkok (Phaya Thai Palace)
- Bangkok → Guilin, China
- Guilin (Folded Brocade Mountains – Peak of the Luminous Moon) (Unaired)
- Guilin (Qing Xiu Lu Hair Salon)
- Guilin (Li River – #24 Bridge)
- Guilin (Ancient South Gate)
- Guilin (Banyan Lake – Sun and Moon Pagodas)

Episode summary

- At the start of this leg, teams were instructed to fly to Guilin, China. Once there, teams had to travel to the Qing Xiu Lu Hair Salon in order to find their next clue.
- For their Speed Bump, Mark & Michael had to wash and dry the hair of two women outside of the hair salon before they could continue racing.
- In this leg's Roadblock, one team member had to direct a cormorant to retrieve fish that they had thrown in the Li River. Once the cormorant retrieved ten fish, teams received their next clue.
- After the Roadblock, teams had to travel to the Ancient South Gate in order to find their next clue.
- This leg's Detour was a choice between Choreography or Calligraphy. In Choreography, teams had to perform a traditional dance routine in order to receive their next clue. In Calligraphy, teams had to copy Chinese characters written by a calligrapher at four stations. Once one of the calligraphers was satisfied with the teams' calligraphy, he stamped their paper and they could proceed to the next station, which was named in the characters that they had just copied. Once teams acquired all four stamps, they were given their next clue.
- After the Detour, teams had to walk to the Pit Stop: the Sun and Moon Pagodas on Banyan Lake.

Additional note

- After arriving in Guilin, teams first traveled to the Folded Brocade Mountains, where they had to climb to the Peak of the Luminous Moon and strike the Drums of Life in order to receive their next clue. This task was unaired, and teams were shown going directly to the hair salon instead.

=== Leg 10 (China) ===
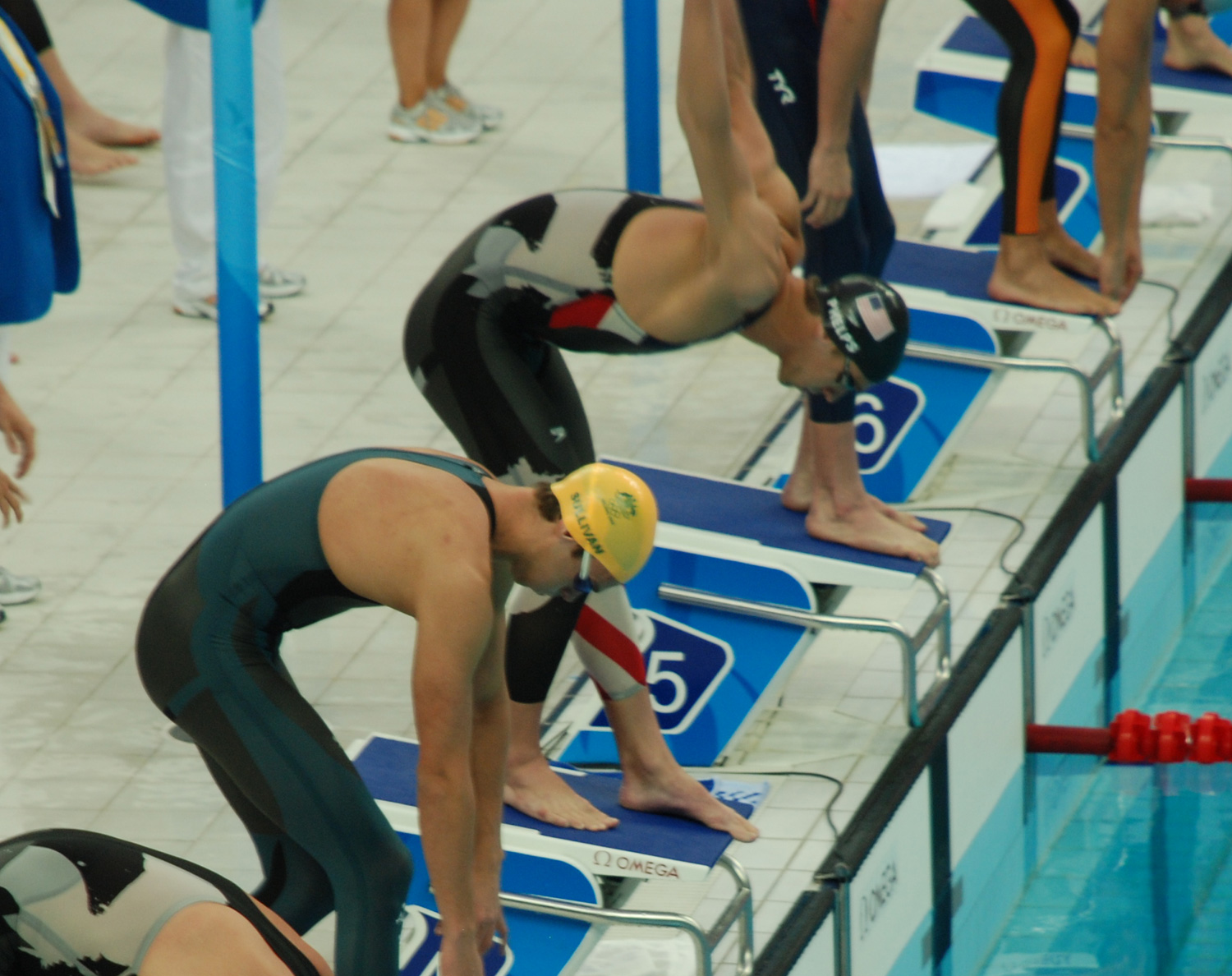
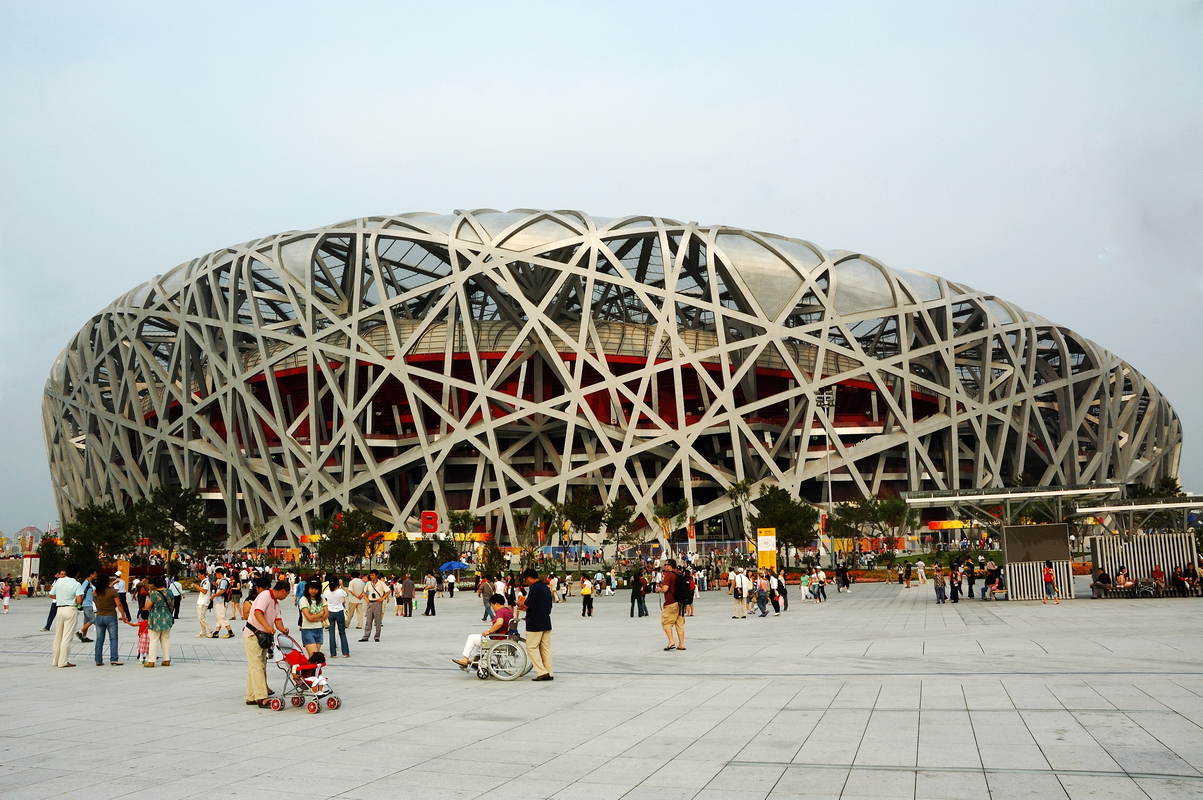
The double-length leg in Beijing paid tribute to the 2008 Summer Olympics, which had been hosted in Beijing. Teams could compete in a swimming Detour inspired by Michael Phelps, and the leg ended at the Beijing National Stadium, which had been the main venue of the Olympics.
- Episode 10: "Having a Baby's Gotta Be Easier Than This" (April 26, 2009) & Episode 11: "No More Mr. Nice Guy" (May 3, 2009)
- Prizes: A pair of jet skis (awarded to Jaime & Cara) & a trip for two to the Galápagos Islands (awarded to Tammy & Victor)
- Eliminated: Kisha & Jen

Locations

- Guilin (Banyan Lake – Sun and Moon Pagodas)
- Guilin → Beijing
- Beijing (Jianguomen Outer Street – Liangzi Foot Massage Palace)
- Beijing (Beijing Muxiyuan Sports Technology School – Guangcai Natatorium)
- Beijing (Drum Tower)
- Beijing (Beihai Street Mall)
- Beijing (Forbidden City – Northwest Corner → Dongdan Station)
- Beijing (Huguang Guild Hall)
- Beijing (Huguang Guild Hall – Wenchang Pavilion)
- Beijing (Donghuamen Night Market)
- Beijing (Beijing National Stadium)

Episode summary (Episode 10)

- At the start of this leg, teams were instructed to fly to Beijing. Once there, teams had to travel to the Liangzi Foot Massage Palace in order to find their next clue.
- In this leg's first Roadblock, one team member had to drink a cup of Chinese medicinal tea, endure a traditional therapeutic foot massage for ten minutes, and drink a second cup of tea in order to receive their next clue. In the event they could not bear the painful part of the massage, they could signal the masseuse to stop; however, the consequence of doing so would result in having to restart the massage from the beginning.
- After the first Roadblock, teams had to travel to the Guangcai Natatorium at the Beijing Muxiyuan Sports Technology School, where they found their next clue.
- This leg's first Detour was a choice between Sync or Swim. In Sync, teams would have had to perform a synchronized dive from three-metre (9.8 ft) springboards and score a five from both judges by hitting the water in unison in order to receive their next clue. In Swim, teams had to don swimsuits and then swim eight lengths of the pool (400 meters) with each team member alternating after two lengths in order to receive their next clue. While some teams attempted Sync, all teams completed Swim.
- After the first Detour, teams had to travel to the North Gate of the Drum Tower. There, teams met Phil, who told them that the leg was not over before handing them their next clue.

Episode summary (Episode 11)

- Teams had to travel to the Beihai Street Mall, where they had to search several stores for a Travelocity Roaming Gnome, which had their next clue written on its base. Teams had to keep the gnome with them for the duration of the leg. At the northwest corner of the Forbidden City, teams had to locate electric bicycles parked across the moat and then navigate themselves past Tiananmen Square to Dongdan Station, where they found their next clue near one of the station entrances.
- This leg's second Detour at the Huguang Guild Hall was a choice between Beijing Opera or Chinese Waiter. In Beijing Opera, teams traveled to the Huguang Huiguan Opera House. There, they had to apply make-up to each other to match two models: a princess and a gentleman. After their makeup was approved, teams had to go to the stage and bow to the master in order to receive their next clue. After completing this task, teams were required to stay in costume for the duration of the leg. In Chinese Waiter, teams had to travel to the Huguang Huiguan Restaurant. There, they had to choose a table of customers and record five orders spoken in Mandarin. Teams then had to pronounce the orders correctly to a chef to have the orders prepared and then serve the plates to the customers in order to receive their next clue. If they pronounced any of the orders incorrectly, they had to go back and retake the orders.
- After the second Detour, teams found their next clue at the Wenchang Pavilion, which directed them to the Donghuamen Night Market for their next clue.
- In this leg's second Roadblock, one team member had to eat a plate of fried Chinese street food that included grasshoppers, beetle larvae, a scorpion, and a starfish in order to receive their next clue, which directed them to the Pit Stop: the Beijing National Stadium.

Additional notes

- Tammy & Victor chose to use the U-Turn on Kisha & Jen.
- Leg 10 was a double leg that aired over two episodes.

=== Leg 11 (China → United States) ===
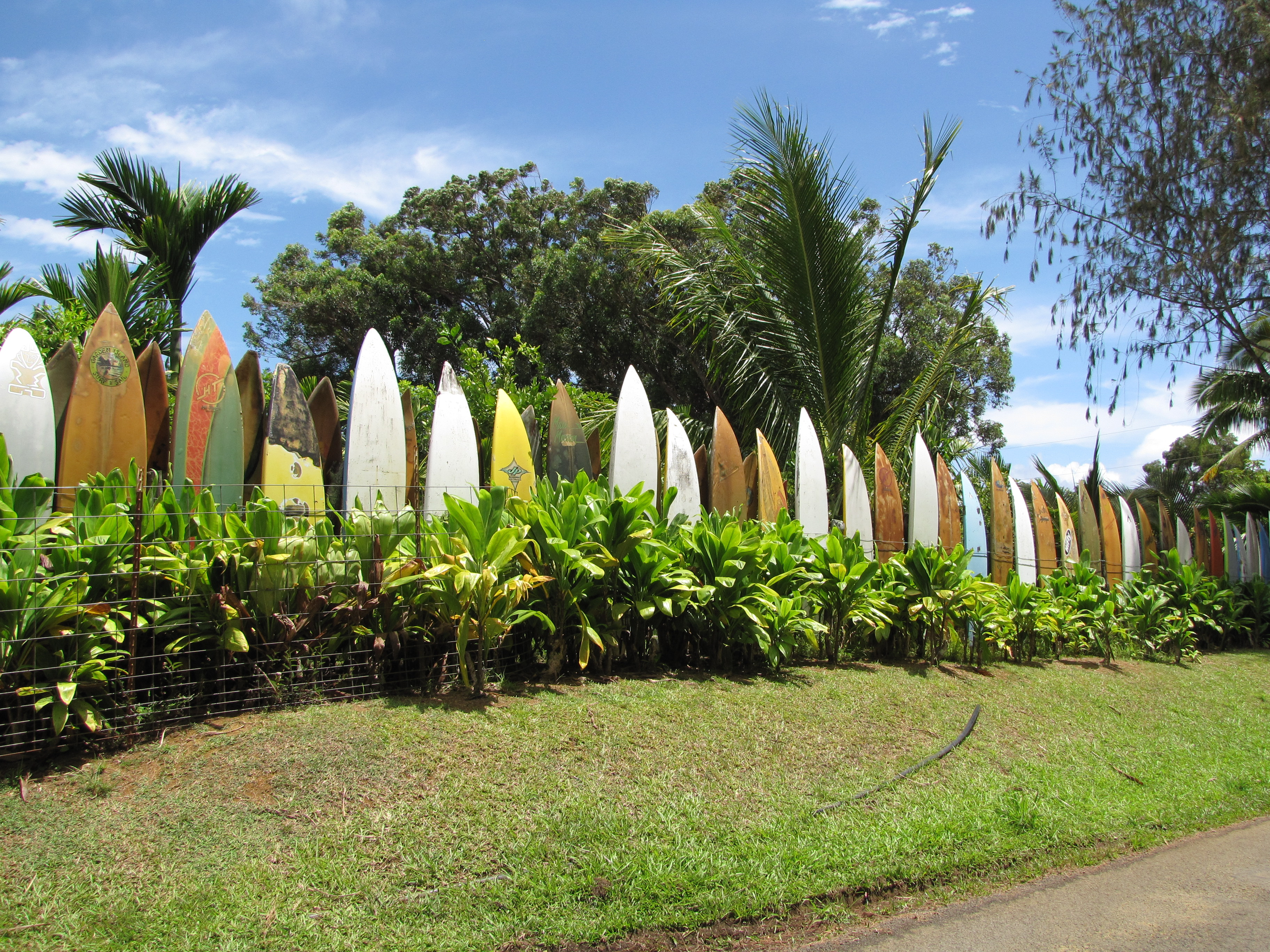
While in Maui, racers had to construct a surfboard fence that depicted images from previous legs during the season's final Roadblock.

- Episode 12: "This is How You Lose a Million Dollars" (May 10, 2009)
- Prize: US$1,000,000
- Winners: Tammy & Victor
- Runners-up: Jaime & Cara
- Third place: Margie & Luke

Locations

- Beijing (Beijing National Stadium)
- Beijing → Kahului, Hawaii
- Kīhei (Beach Access 118)
- Māʻalaea (McGregor Point)
- Haʻikū-Pauwela (Kaʻohu Farms Peʻahi – Maui Surfboard Fence)
- Waikapu (King Kamehameha Golf Club)

Episode summary

- At the start of this leg, teams were instructed to fly to Kahului, on the island of Maui in Hawaii. Once there, teams had to travel to Beach Access 118, where they had to season a 145-pound (66 kg) pig with island flavoring and then carry it suspended on a bamboo pole 200 yards (180 m) along the beach to a Hawaiian lūʻau. At the lūʻau, they had to properly cover the pig for traditional kālua cooking before receiving their next clue.
- Teams were then directed to McGregor Point, where they had to drive a personal water craft one mile (1.6 km) along a marked course to a field of one hundred buoys and search for one of four buoys that had their next clue attached. Teams then had to travel to the Maui Surfboard Fence and find their next clue.
- In this season's final Roadblock, one team member had to search through a pile of more than three hundred surfboards for eleven that displayed an image depicting a task, location, or person related to the ten previous legs (one from each of the first nine legs, and one from each half of the tenth leg). They then had to arrange the surfboards along a fence in chronological order based on their appearance during the season. When all eleven surfboards were displayed in the correct order, teams received their final clue directing them to the finish line: the King Kamehameha Golf Club in Waikapu.

Leg	Picture	Source	Nation
1	Saint Christopher	Clue at Church of Sant'Antonio	Switzerland
2	Ruhpolding Gondola	Gondola Ride to Rauschberg	Germany
3	Gymnast	Gymnastics Roadblock Task	Romania
4	10 Ruble Banknote	Krasnoyarsk Dam	Russia
5	Lada Automobile	Novosibirsk Lada	Russia
6	Nose Flutist	Jaipur Pit Stop Greeter	India
7	Esso the Tiger	Phuket Zoo Task	Thailand
8	Long-Tail Boat	Boat Riding in Bangkok	Thailand
9	Cormorant	Guilin Cormorant Roadblock Task	China
10	Reflexology Foot Chart	Beijing Foot Massage Roadblock Task	China
10	Skewered Scorpions	Beijing Delicacies Roadblock Task	China

== Elimination Station ==
After elimination, the first six teams eliminated were sequestered at a villa in Ko Samui, Thailand, to await the finale. CBS posted short videos on its website after each episode aired in the Pacific time zone to show the eliminated teams interacting at the villa.

- After Leg 1, Preston & Jennifer were the first team eliminated and were sent to the villa. They expressed their disappointment at being eliminated first and believed that Steve & Linda would be eliminated next. They also discussed who they believe are strong teams and got into an argument over the factors that led to their elimination.
- After Leg 2, Steve & Linda were the second team eliminated and were sent to the villa. Steve openly complained about Preston & Jennifer refusing to form an alliance with him and Linda during the first leg, which irritated Preston. Later in the day, the two eliminated teams decided to take a trip to a local snake farm, and then went out to eat. They then predicted that either Christie & Jodi or Jaime & Cara would be the next team eliminated.
- After Leg 3, Brad & Victoria were the third team eliminated and were sent to the villa. Their arrival surprised the other two eliminated teams. While recounting the events leading to her and Brad's elimination, Victoria broke down into tears. Tensions developed between Steve & Linda and Preston & Jennifer during the conversation, as Jennifer was perceived as an incessant talker, even interrupting Linda at one point. The next morning, the three eliminated teams visited a Buddhist temple, receiving a blessing of good luck from a monk.
- After Leg 4, Amanda & Kris were the fourth team eliminated and were sent to the villa. They talked about what happened during the Leg, erroneously deducing that it was either Christie & Jodi or Kisha & Jen who had U-Turned them. Afterward, the four eliminated teams went to the beach to celebrate Loy Krathong.
- Leg 5 was a non-elimination leg, hence no new teams were sent to the villa. The eliminated teams received Thai massages and went ziplining.
- After Leg 6, Christie & Jodi were the fifth team eliminated and were sent to the villa. They first told Amanda & Kris that it was Margie & Luke who U-Turned them, which came as a shock to everyone. Tension developed between Steve and the rest of the group, especially Preston & Jennifer. Steve accused the group of shunning him and Linda, leading to an argument.
- After Leg 7, Mel & Mike were the sixth team eliminated and were sent to the villa. They noted how the remaining teams on the season are becoming more competitive. Afterward, everyone went shopping at a nearby marketplace. Tension continued to grow between Preston & Jennifer when Preston became irritated with her over her buying another purse.
- Leg 8 was a non-elimination leg, so no new teams were eliminated. Due to their constant arguing, Preston & Jennifer chose to spend some time away from each other. The eliminated teams spent the day snorkeling and kayaking at an island.
- After Leg 9, Mark & Michael were the seventh team eliminated. Before receiving a phone call from the latest team that was eliminated, the eliminated teams at the villa went on a safari, most notably riding an elephant. Afterward, Mark & Michael called the villa to inform the other teams of their elimination and told them of the time penalties that led to their elimination. All teams agreed that they wanted to see Jaime & Cara eliminated next.
- Leg 10 was a double-length leg, shown over two episodes. A new episode of Elimination Station was posted after each half aired:
  - The first half ended with a Virtual Pit Stop (no elimination). Elimination Station showed the sequestered teams on their last day at the Elimination Station, where the teams discussed their time together and who they wanted to see win The Amazing Race. As the eliminated teams packed for their trip to the End City, each of the teams further reminisced about their stay at the Elimination Station.
  - After the second half of the leg, Kisha & Jen were the eighth and final team eliminated. Elimination Station showed the six eliminated teams arriving at the End City in Maui, Hawaii. After arriving in Maui, the teams checked into a hotel. Once they checked in, they swam and snorkeled at the beach, then returned to the hotel to await a phone call from the eighth team eliminated. The six eliminated teams at the hotel were shocked and disappointed to hear about Kisha & Jen's elimination, especially Preston & Jennifer who wanted them to win. Kisha & Jen told them about what went wrong during the second half of Leg 10 and on the part where they were U-Turned by Tammy & Victor. Kisha & Jen said they wanted to see either Jaime & Cara or Tammy & Victor win, despite having been U-Turned by the latter. Kisha and Jen then told the other eliminated teams that they would meet again at the Finish Line before hanging up. The eliminated teams then shared their thoughts about the upcoming final leg of The Amazing Race, many of them expressing their shock over the fact that Jaime & Cara were one of the final three teams.
- Leg 11 was the final leg of The Amazing Race 14. Mark & Michael and Kisha & Jen reunited with the other eliminated teams at the Finish Line at King Kamehameha Golf Club. Many teams believed that Tammy & Victor would win, while Kisha & Jen noted that Margie & Luke had gotten more tense with each other. Teams expressed their opinions about the final three teams at the Finish Line along with their joys and disappointments.

== Reception ==
=== Critical response ===
The Amazing Race 14 received mixed-to-positive reviews. Andy Dehnart of reality blurred praised the reduction of time in airport, the cast, and improvements in editing and said that the season finished with "a strong end to an even stronger season." Michael Hewitt of the Orange County Register wrote that the season was "another excellent edition of 'The Amazing Race.'" Michael Russnow of The Huffington Post criticized this season's route as the show "didn’t travel in as diversified a fashion, and wherever the teams wound up they stayed in the immediate region a lot longer than in earlier years." Alan Sepinwall of The Star-Ledger wrote that his "interest in the season dropped rapidly after Mel and Mike were eliminated" and that he "lacked either an emotional investment in another team or an admiration for them as pure Racers." In 2016, this season was ranked 12th out of the first 27 seasons by the Rob Has a Podcast Amazing Race correspondents. In 2021, Val Barone of TheThings ranked this season as the show's 9th best season. In 2022, Jason Shomer of Collider ranked this season among the show's top seven seasons. In 2023, Rhenn Taguiam of Game Rant ranked this season as the fifteenth-best season. In 2024, Taguiam's ranking was updated with this season ranked 18th out of 36.

=== Ratings ===
U.S. Nielsen ratings

#	Episode	Rating	Share	Rating/Share (18–49)	Viewers (millions)	Rank (Overall)
1	"Don't Let A Cheese Hit Me"	5.4	9	2.6/7	9.20	#27
2	"Your Target Is Your Partner's Face"	4.4	7	2.6/6	7.81	#34
3	"I'm Not Wearing That Girl's Leotard"	6.6	11	3.0/8	10.60	#18
4	"It Was Like a Caravan of Idiots"	6.1	10	3.1/8	10.13	#28
5	"She's a Little Scared of Stick, But I Think She’ll Be OK!"	5.9	10	3.1/8	10.33	#26
6	"Alright Guys, We're at War!"	7.2	11	3.6/9	12.42	#15
7	"Gorilla? Gorilla?? Gorilla???"	7.1	11	3.7/9	11.99	#12
8	"Rooting Around in People's Mouths Could Be Unpleasant"	6.2	10	3.1/8	10.57	#18
9	"Our Parents Will Cry Themselves to Death"	6.1	10	3.0/8	10.30	#20
10	"Having a Baby's Gotta Be Easier Than This"	6.0	10	3.2/9	10.27	#17
11	"No More Mr. Nice Guy"	6.8	9	3.2/9	10.84	#20
12	"This is How You Lose a Million Dollars"	7.6	10	3.1/9	12.49	#19

Canadian ratings

#	Episode	Viewers (millions)	Rank (Overall)
1	"Don't Let A Cheese Hit Me"	1.96	#5
2	"Your Target Is Your Partner's Face"	1.45	#15
3	"I'm Not Wearing That Girl's Leotard"	2.00	#4
4	"It Was Like a Caravan of Idiots"	2.01	#4
5	"She's a Little Scared of Stick, But I Think She’ll Be OK!"	1.89	#8
6	"Alright Guys, We're at War!"	1.94	#5
7	"Gorilla? Gorilla?? Gorilla???"	1.88	#5
8	"Rooting Around in People's Mouths Could Be Unpleasant"	1.56	#10
9	"Our Parents Will Cry Themselves to Death"	2.07	#6
10	"Having a Baby's Gotta Be Easier Than This"	2.18	#2
11	"No More Mr. Nice Guy"	1.99	#5
12	"This is How You Lose a Million Dollars"	2.17	#4
