= Sun and Moon Pagodas =

Twin pagodas in Guilin, Guangxi

- 日月双塔
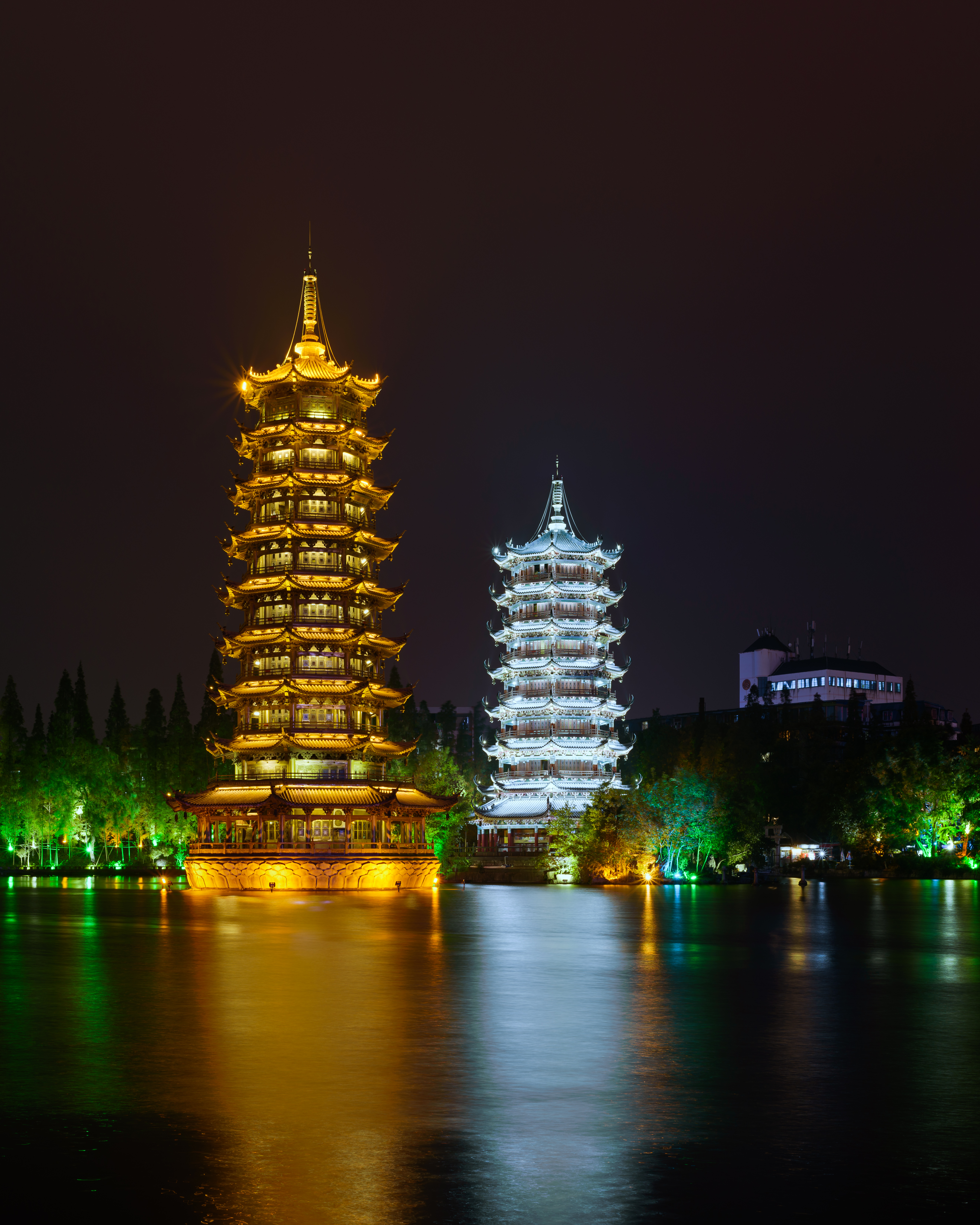
- The Sun and Moon Pagodas in 2017

- Location within Guangxi Location within China

Religion
- Affiliation: Buddhism
- Sect: Mahayana
- Prefecture: Guilin
- Province: Guangxi

Location
- Country: China
- Interactive map of Sun and Moon Pagodas
- Prefecture: Guilin
- Coordinates: 25°16′16″N 110°17′42″E

Architecture
- Style: Chinese architecture
- Established: 10th century
- Completed: 2001

The Sun and Moon Pagodas (Chinese: 日月双塔; pinyin: Rìyuè Shuāngtǎ) are twin pagodas located in Guilin, Guangxi, China. Originally built in the city moat of Guilin during the Tang dynasty, the pagodas were reconstructed in 2001 using historical records as the centerpiece of Riyue Shuangta Cultural Park—–a park themed around the unity of Buddhism, Confucianism, and Taoism. The Moon Pagoda was built on an island in Shan Lake while the Sun Pagoda was built out in the lake. The Sun Pagoda has an octagonal base, is faced with bronze, has nine stories, and is 41 m (135 ft) tall. The Sun Pagoda is the tallest bronze pagoda in the world and is one of the few pagodas in the world that has an elevator. The Moon Pagoda meanwhile has an octagonal base, is faced with glazed tile, has seven stories, and is 35 m (115 ft) tall. They were featured as the ninth Pit Stop during the fourteenth season of The Amazing Race in 2009.

== Reconstruction ==
Shan Lake was drained and the area was excavated. The excavation located the original foundations and several artifacts including historic japa mala. The most significant find was a stone box which contained scrolls written by a Tang dynasty emperor. The scrolls relate Buddhist teachings to the Chinese zodiac. The artifacts unearthed during the excavation are housed in an underground museum on site, which also contains statues of Laozi and Confucius in accordance with the theme of the park. The museum also has reliefs of the Bodhisattva Bhaisajyaguru who is the patron of the Chinese Zodiac. The Sun Pagoda is connected to the Moon Pagoda via an underwater glass tunnel and its ground floor contains a tea house and a bronze bell for blessings. The elevator only goes to the sixth level and visitors must climb stairs to see the finger bone of Buddha relic and take in the view of downtown.
