= State Public Scientific & Technological Library =

Library in Novosibirsk, Russia

- Государственная публичная научно-техническая библиотека СО РАН
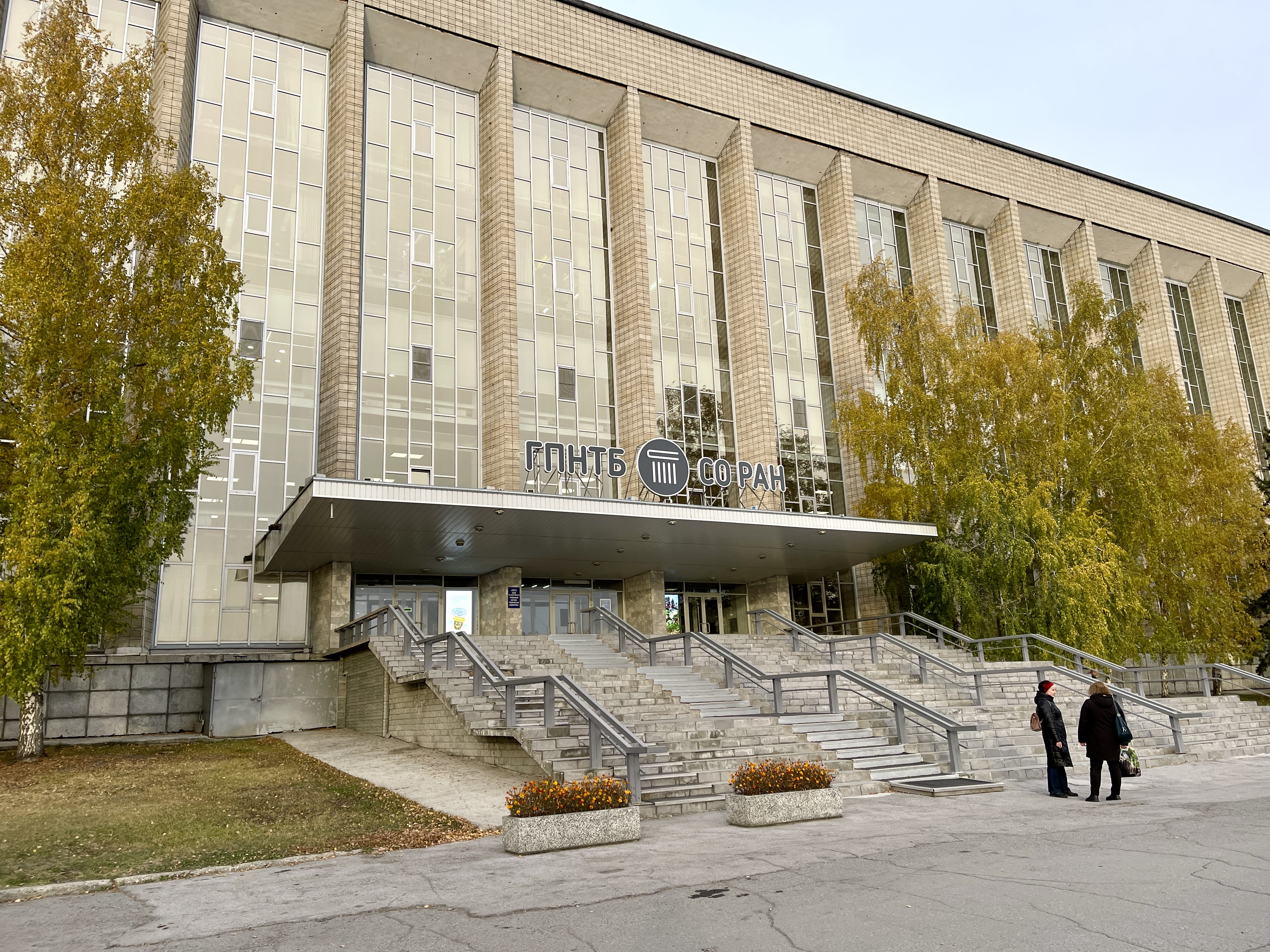
- 55.01748676338302°N 82.9475498924441°E
- Location: Novosibirsk, Russia
- Established: 1918 (108 years ago)

Collection
- Size: 14,000,000

Other information
- Director: Irina V. Lizunova
- Website: www.spsl.nsc.ru

State Public Scientific and Technological Library of the Siberian Branch of the Russian Academy of Sciences (SPSTL SB RAS) is the largest library in Russia east of the Urals, the State Universal Book repository of Siberia, an Informational Center of the federal level, head library of the centralized system. Within the library building are the Museum of the Book, Siberian Regional Library Center of Continuous Education (SRLCCE), Siberian Regional Center of Document Conservation, Multi-functional Regional Center for Patent and Informational Services in the sphere of protection of intellectual property objects. The Library is the only research institute in the East of the country in the field of librarianship and bibliology with 26 specialists having candidate degree and 6 – Doctor degree.

The Library is located in Novosibirsk, Voskhod Str., 15.

SPSTL SB RAS is a public universal library, one of the biggest owners of information resources. The library is used by over 2000 professors and tutors, as well as nearly 1,500 postgraduates and more than 11 000 students. The library site is visited by more than some million users. The library is a unique collection of Russian and foreign books, journals, patents and standards, etc. – about 14 mill. documents. SPSTL SB RAS is the only library in Siberia that receives a legally mandated free copy of every book published in Russia. The foreign part of the collection is 3.5 mill. documents. The Library provides remote access to nearly 8000 full-text foreign journals. In access are also reference databases with information from more than 18 000 foreign periodicals. The Library servers maintain 110 different databases, more than 47 million records on all themes of scientific and technical tasks being solved in Siberia. The database "Scientific Sibirica" is being generated. The developed technology of digitizing rare books and manuscripts allows to provide the remote access to more than 1,000 unique documents, which may not be used in situ. Information and library services for readers and users are realized on the base of the newest automation technologies both in the Library and via Internet.

Library has 18 reading rooms where 600 readers can work simultaneously. More than 1,000 visitors come here daily and borrow nearly 12,000 documents.

The collection of rare books and manuscripts is one of the important book monuments of Russian culture. Its uniqueness and completeness allows to consider it as an insurance stock of the Russian national memory. The most important part of this collection are books and manuscripts, found during archaeographical expeditions in Siberia and the Russian Far East.

The main function of SPSTL SB RAS is information provision of scientific research in the Siberian Branch of the RAS, information support of its 90 scientific institutions, as well as information and library servicing specialists all round Siberia. The Library ensures their right on free access to information and the world's cultural values.

SPSTL SB RAS possesses the richest intellectual resources in the professional field. During the last 10 years more than 300 librarians graduated from The Highest librarian courses. The leading specialists are also professors, docents and tutors in the Novosibirsk State Pedagogical University where they teach future librarians. During the last 15 years at SRLCCE training seminars more than 5000 librarians improved their professional skills on information technologies, electronic resources and electronic libraries. The continuous training seminar on licensing and patenting is annually attended by 300 specialists. Since 2010 here works the Informational school for young scientist. In SPSTL SB RAS there are postgraduate courses and doctorate. The Dissertation Council works since 1995, where 85 theses have been defended. As an important cultural and educational center, it organizes lectures, academic conferences, seminars, presentations, exhibitions and excursions.

As a center of international partnership SPSTL SB RAS has scientific and business relationships with many countries, including Germany, Great Britain, China, North Korea and others. A significant amount of foreign publications is received owing to the international book exchange with more than 290 organizations in 39 countries.

== Publishing activities ==
The library's own publishing house issues current and retrospective indexes, analytic reviews on environment protection. As a research institute, it publishes collections of articles, monographs on bibliology, librarianship and informatics, guidelines and text-books, as well as the only beyond the Urals scientific journal on bibliology and librarianship, Bibliosphere.

== History ==
SPSTL (firstly State Scientific Library (SSL) of the Presidium of Highest Council of national economy, Moscow) was established in 1918. Its first directors and organizers were L.A. Schlossberg, A.I. Yakovlev, D.I. Ulyanov. In 1927 SSL became the Central Library for Industry. In 1946, in accordance with the government's decision, the library was transferred to the Ministry of Higher Education of USSR for servicing research workers and engineers, working in different ministries, institutions and enterprises of the country. In 1948 the library was granted the right to get free obligatory copy of all printed production of USSR from the All-Union Book Chamber.

== SPSTL as part of the Siberian Branch of the Academy of Sciences of the USSR ==
In 1958, in accordance with the order of the USSR Soviet of Ministers, the Library was transferred to the just formed Siberian Branch of the Academy of Science of the USSR and received its current name.

== Building construction ==
The construction of the Library building began in 1961. The project was designed by the group of architects.

== See also ==
- List of libraries in Russia
