= Rauschberg =

Mountain in Bavaria, Germany

Coordinates: 47°44′N 12°41′E

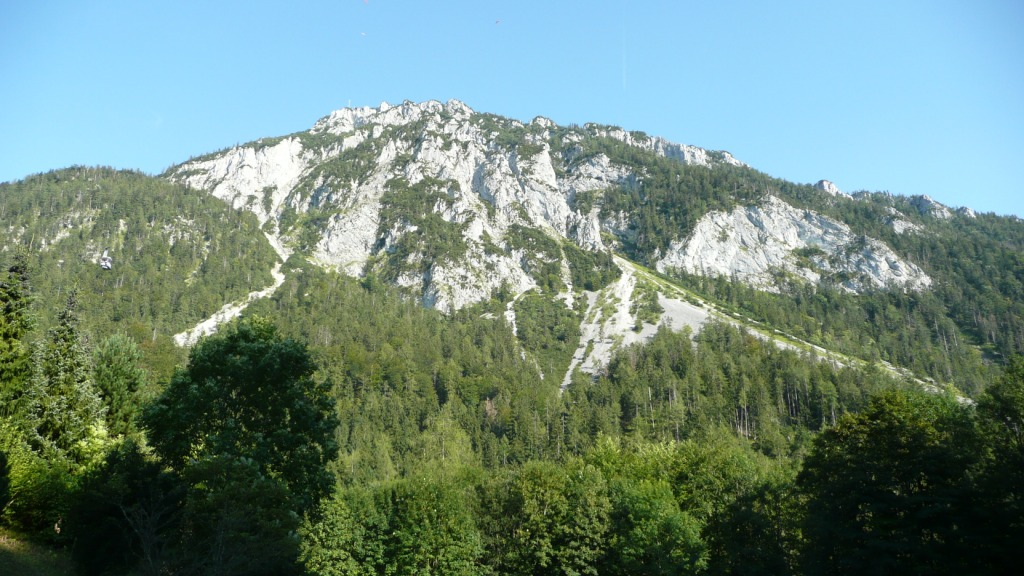
- The Rauschberg.

Highest point
- Elevation: 1,671 m (5,482 ft)

Geography
- Location: Bavaria, Germany

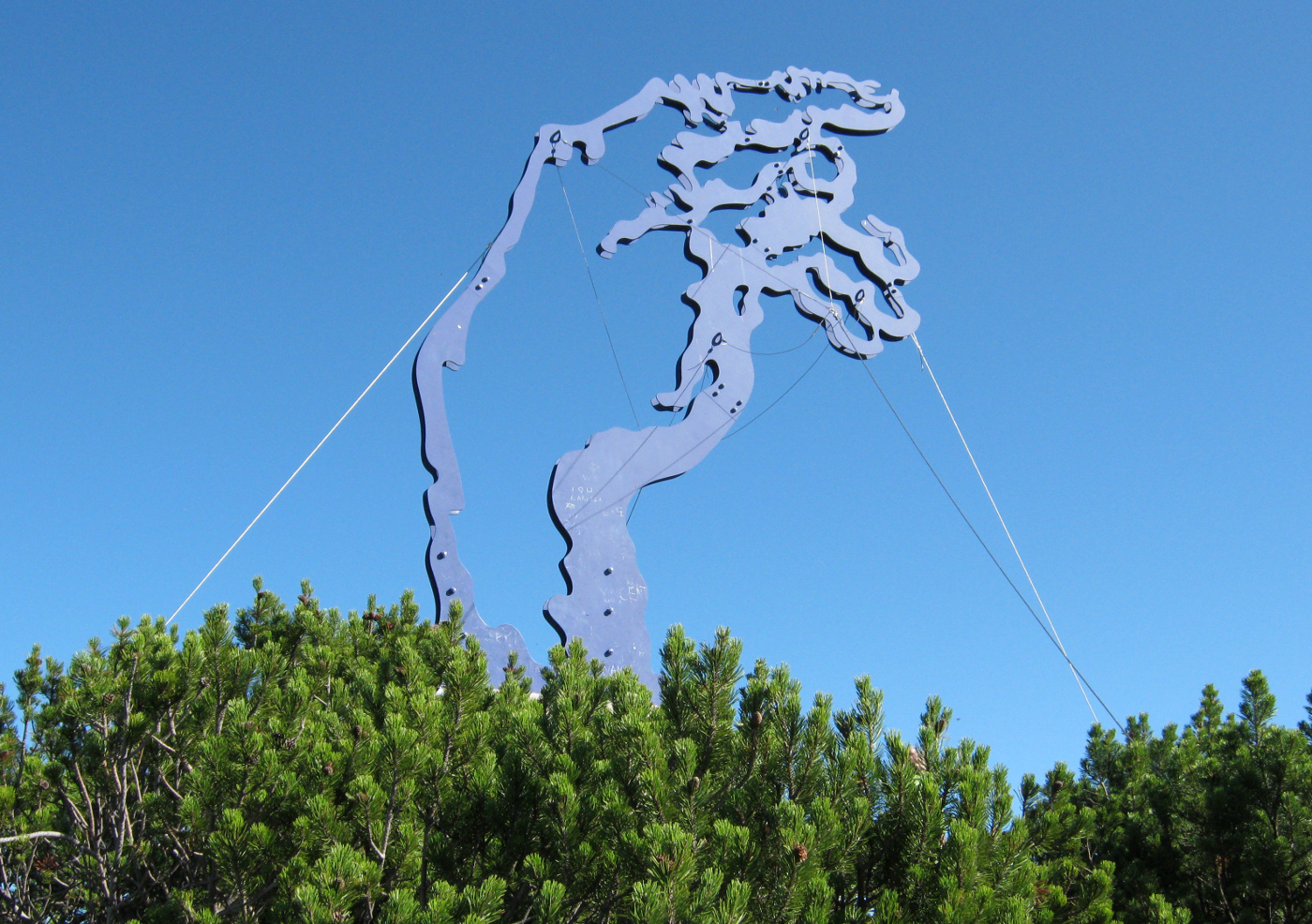
Adam's Hand by Angerer der Jüngere

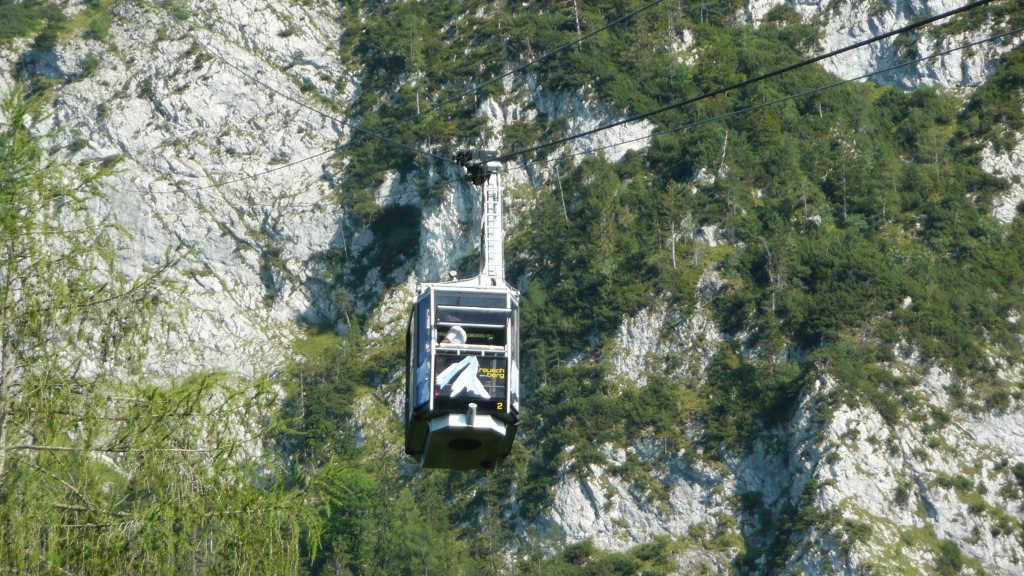
Cable car gondola

Rauschberg is a mountain of Bavaria, Germany.

It is located in south eastern Ruhpolding. It is 230 million years old. Athletic people need 1h to the top and the others need 2h.

There is a song called "Fahren mit der Rauschbergbahn" which you traditionally sing during the hike. You can use the mountain railway, if you are too lazy to go there by yourself.
