= Ovsyanka, Krasnoyarsk Krai =

Village in Krasnoyarsk Krai, Russia

Ovsyanka Овсянка
- Interactive map of Ovsyanka
- Location of Ovsyanka Ovsyanka (Krasnoyarsk Krai)
- Coordinates: 55°57.228′N 92°34.8′E
- Country: Russia
- Federal subject: Krasnoyarsk Krai
- Administrative district: Rybinsky District
- Founded: 1671

Population (2010 Census)
  - Total: 2,228
  - Estimate (2010): 2,228 (0%)
- Time zone: UTC+7 (MSK+4)
- OKTMO ID: 04709000121

Ovsyanka (Russian: Овсянка) is a village in Krasnoyarsk Krai. The population at the 2010 census was 2228.

== Geography ==
Ovsyanka lies along the Yenisei River and is surrounded by forests.
