= Huguang Guild Hall =

Opera theater in Beijing, China

Coordinates: 39.8875°N 116.3777°E

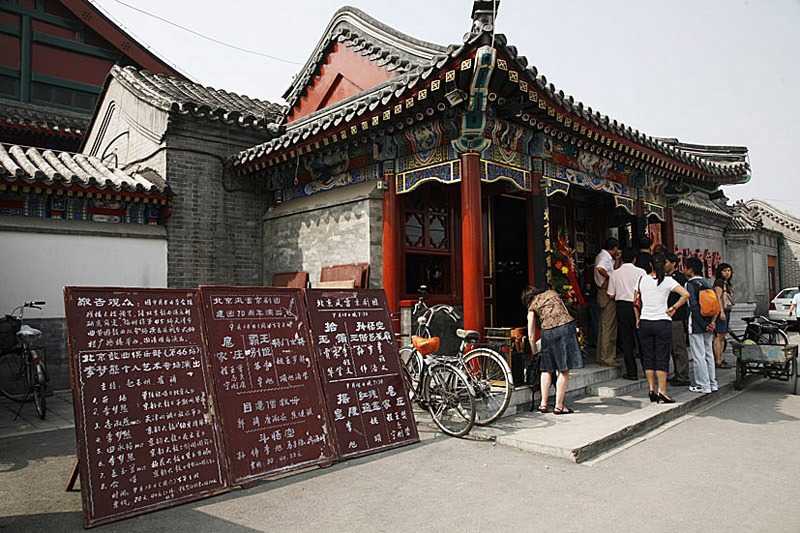
View at Huguang Guild Hall

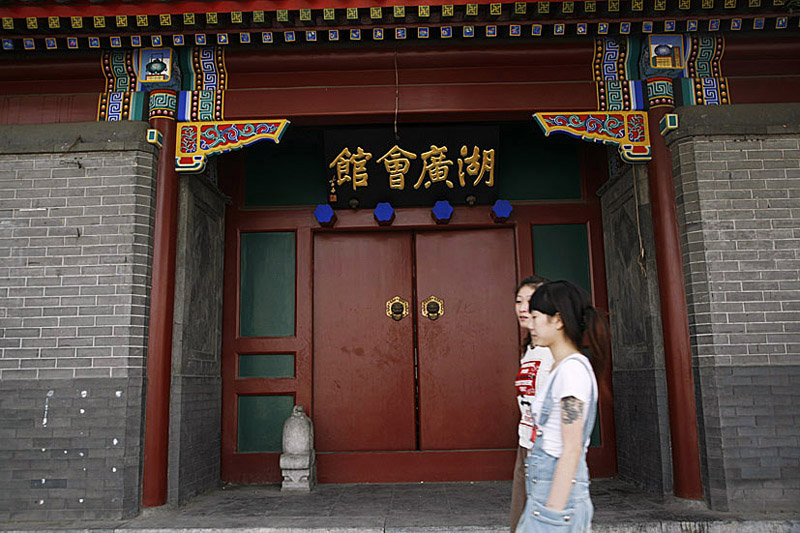
Entrance at Huguang Guild Hall

The Huguang Guild Hall (simplified Chinese: 湖广会馆; traditional Chinese: 湖廣會館; pinyin: Húguǎng huìguǎn; lit. 'Huguang Assembly Hall') in Beijing is one of Beijing's most renowned Peking opera theaters.

== History ==
Built in 1807, and at the height of its glory, the Huguang Guild Hall, along with the Zhengyici Peking Opera Theater was known as one of the "Four Great Theaters" in all of Beijing. Many famous past and present opera performers have performed here.

On August 25, 1912, the Chinese Nationalist Party (Kuomintang or KMT) was founded at the guild hall at a convention of the Revolutionary Alliance, led by Sun Yat-sen, and five smaller pro-revolution parties. Together they formed the KMT to contest the first national elections of the Republic of China. The guild hall held several hundred party activists and several thousand spectators. Sun, the then Premier of the Republic, was chosen as the party chairman with Huang Xing as his deputy.

== Facilities ==
The entire complex covers a large area, and the main buildings of the hall include the opera building, Wenchang building, Xiangxian Temple and Chuwan hall. The theater is known for its sumptuous interior, which is colored in red, green, and gold, with tables and a stone floor. The Huguang Guild Hall also contains a small museum which exhibits the theater's history of Beijing opera.

== See also ==
- History of Beijing
