= Phuket Zoo =

Zoo in southern Thailand

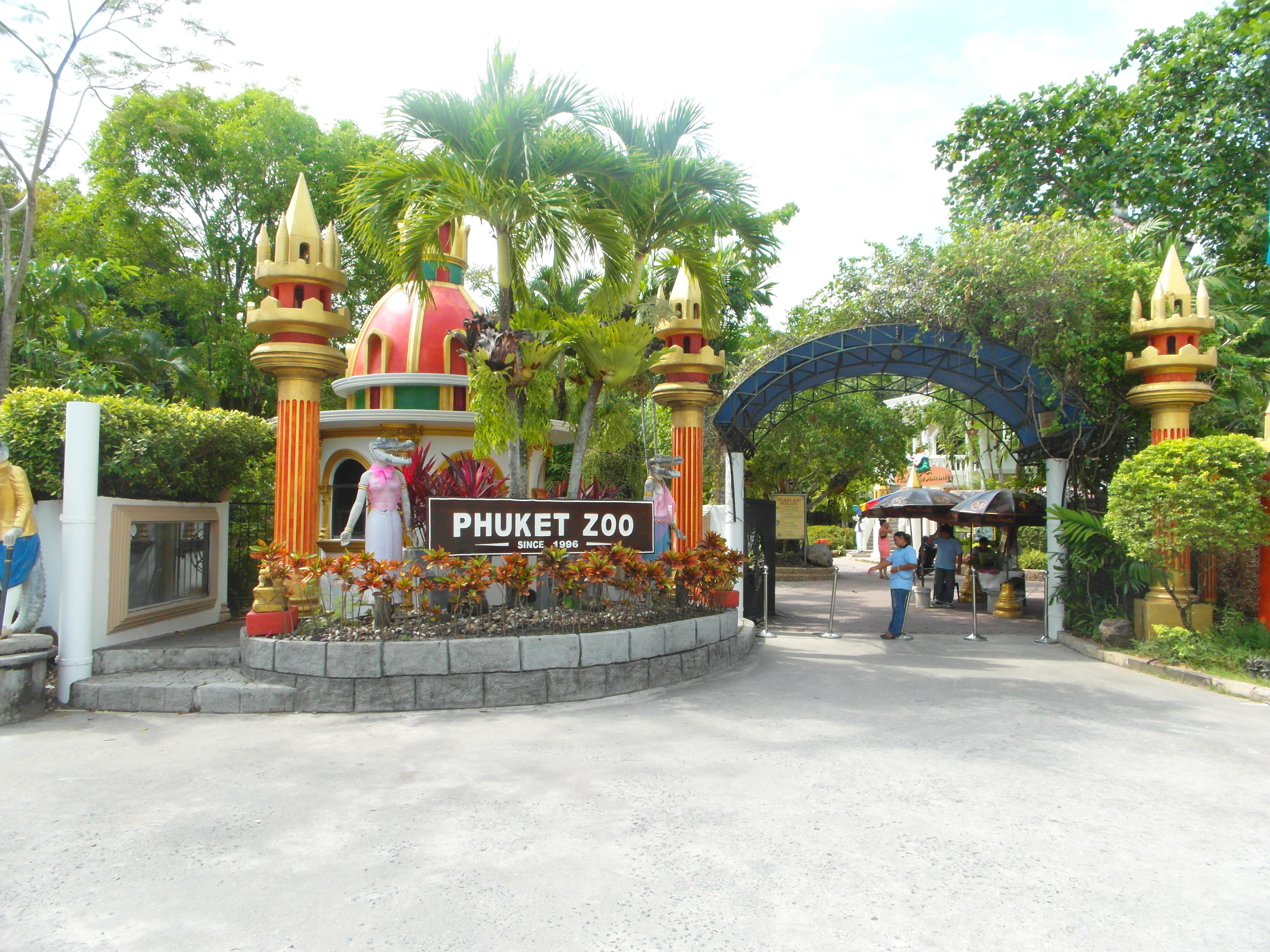
- The Phuket Zoo
- Interactive map of Phuket Zoo
- 7.8427918461311315°N 98.35794242236128°E
- Date opened: 1997 (original); 2025 (revamped)
- Location: Phuket, Thailand
- Land area: 4.8 ha (30 rai)
- Major exhibits: Elephant show; monkey show; Bird Park; aquarium; crocodile shows; orchid garden
- Website: www.phuketzoo.com

The Phuket Zoo was a zoo located in Phuket, Thailand. It was founded as a private zoo in 1997. The zoo was located near the Mueang Phuket district and the Phuket Bay. The zoo had been embroiled in controversy over its lack of animal welfare standards and allegations of extreme cruelty to animals.

The zoo covered an area of 4.8 hectares (30 rai). It was known for having close encounters with many exotic animals including tigers, monkeys and elephants. The zoo had many sections including areas devoted to crocodiles, elephants and monkeys while also having an aquarium and an orchard garden.

The zoo closed in 2020; the main reason for its closure being the lack of tourists due to the COVID-19 pandemic.

== Animal shows ==
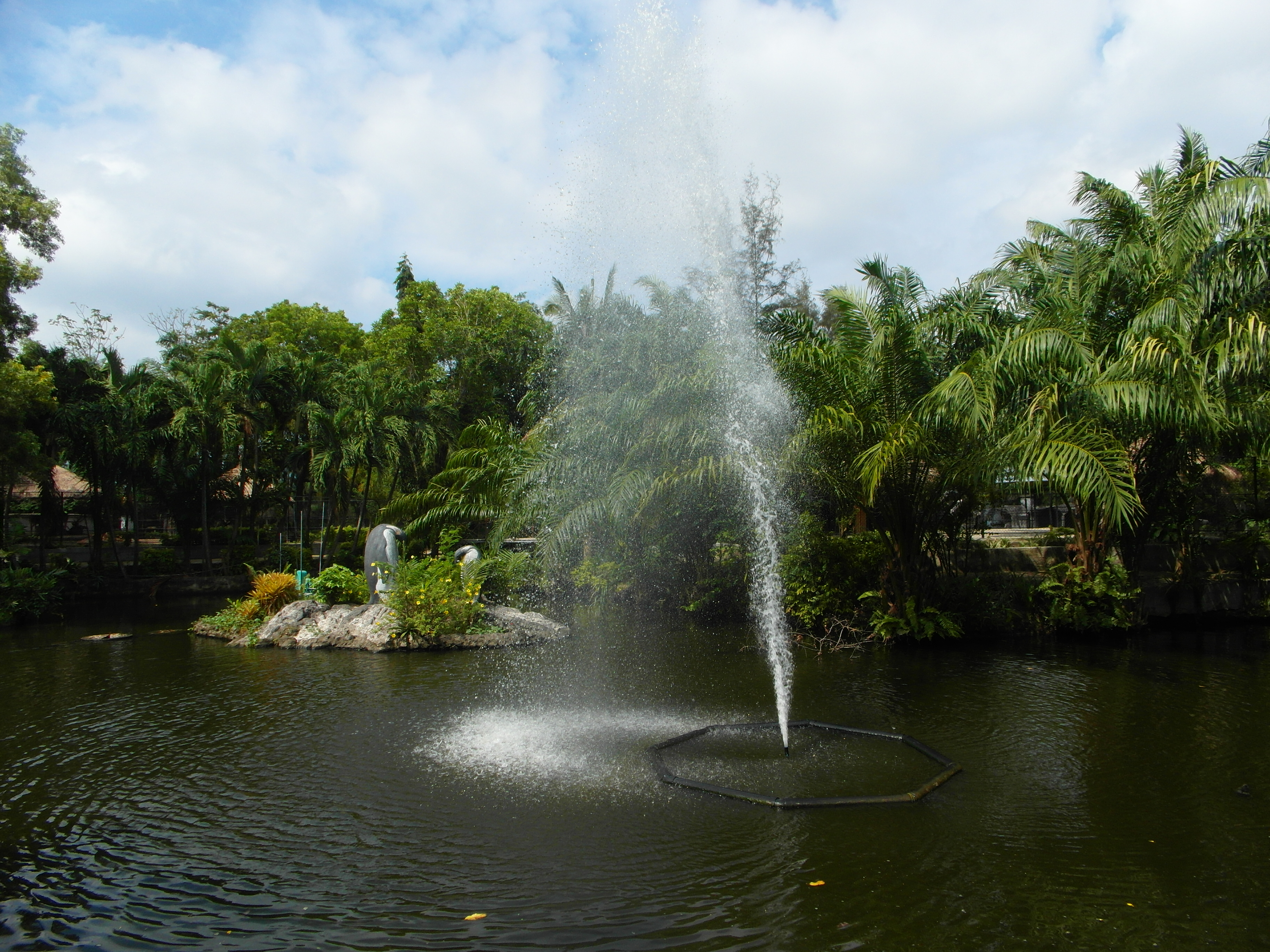
Inside Phuket Zoo

=== Monkey shows ===
The monkey show consisted of a macaque monkey doing tricks and then taking pictures with the crowd. Some of the monkey's tricks included riding a bike, playing basketball and doing exercises like push-ups and sit-ups. Afterwards, the monkey walked around with an oil-paper umbrella and took photos with guests.

=== Elephant shows ===
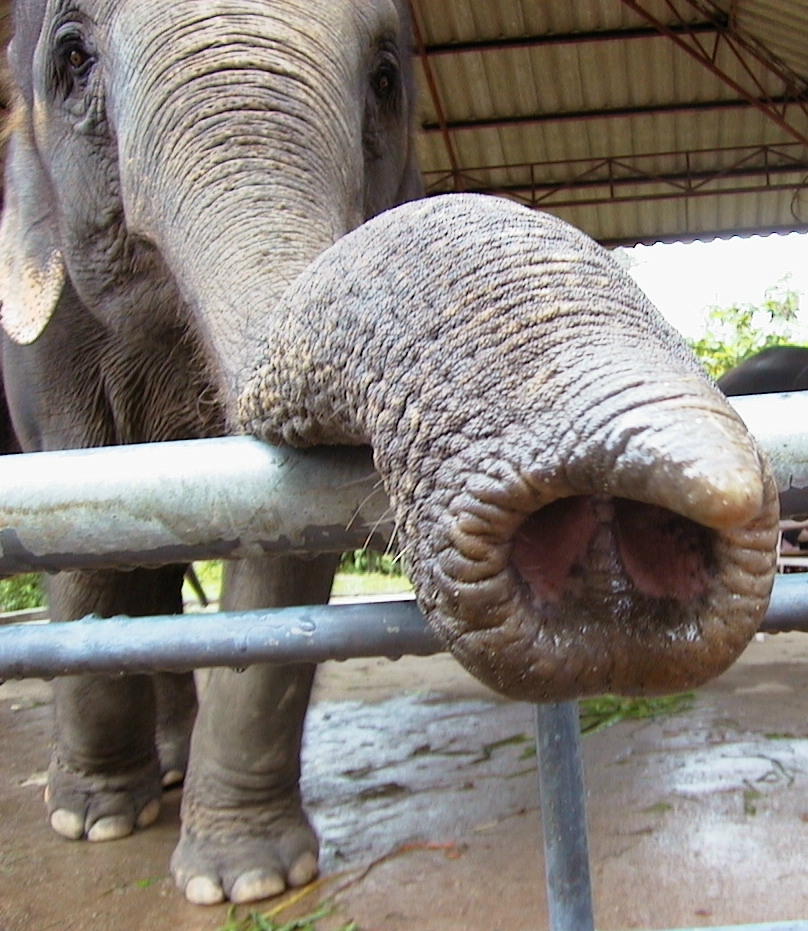
An elephant's trunk at the Phuket Zoo

The elephant shows consisted of a group of Asian elephants performing tricks, with the opportunity for the guests to meet the elephants. The elephants started off by doing tricks like kicking a soccer ball and also did dances and races. At times, guests were able to feed the elephants bananas, and at the end, touch their trunks. The elephants have even been trained to ask for tips. Some people thought the shows were demeaning to the elephants involved. The elephants the zoo had were formerly logging elephants.

=== Crocodile shows ===
While there were no encounters guests could have with the crocodiles, many guests found the shows entertaining. The highlight was when one of the trainers stuck his head in the crocodile's mouth.

== Exhibits ==
=== Aquarium ===
The zoo had a small aquarium with a variety of fish, marine animals and reptiles, including freshwater and saltwater fish, turtles, frogs, crabs and lizards. They also had a display area showing fishing equipment and techniques of Thailand's fishermen, as well as seashells.

=== Bird Park ===
The Phuket's Zoo Bird Park housed a variety of bird species, including toucans, peafowl, parrots, hawks, emus and ostriches. Some of the birds were allowed to fly freely around the park.

== Animal encounters ==
As well as the opportunities to meet the animals during the shows, the Phuket Zoo allowed guests to meet some of the other animals in their collection. Some of those opportunities include getting to take photos with and pet a tiger. Formerly, guests could take pictures with and hold an orangutan, but she was later confiscated by the police. The experiences were an extra fee.

== Conservation efforts by the zoo ==
It did not appear that the Phuket Zoo was involved with conservation efforts to save animals worldwide. They were also not accredited by the South East Asian Zoos Association (which is the main coordinating body for zoos in Thailand) or the World Association of Zoos and Aquariums.

== Milo the Orangutan ==
The Phuket Zoo formerly had an orangutan named Milo. However, a petition gathered more than 10,000 signatures for her to be removed, due to her being forced to take photos with tourists and her health struggles. Due to the petition being circulated, the Natural Resources and Environmental Crime Division of the Royal Thai Police and Department of National Parks decided to confiscate her, after it appeared she was being kept illegally.

When the authorities came to confiscate Milo, she was not at the zoo. All pictures of her on the zoo's website were also deleted. Later in the week, Milo was found in a small cage in the jungle.

Milo died the following year of a stroke. Her poor health from her time at the zoo most likely contributed to her death.

== Controversy ==
While many guests enjoyed their time at the Phuket Zoo, many visitors found the zoo to be cruel and inhumane.

=== Disappearance of animals ===
Some guests have complained that animals at the zoo including snow leopards and camels disappeared without any word from the zoo. Some people speculated that the animals may have become sick and were sold off before they died.

=== Monkeys ===
The macaque monkey used in the monkey shows had a rope around their neck and were forced to do tricks. One exhibit held two monkeys, but one was more aggressive than the other, forcing it to become malnourished. One gibbon was even held in a staff-member's arms all day and stayed in a locked cage at night with no room to move around.

=== Elephants ===
In 2019, a two-year-old elephant died from injuries sustained after performing for tourists.

=== Crocodiles ===
The crocodile exhibit was highly criticised for being overcrowded, small and dirty. Many people said the water the crocodiles lived in was too shallow and filled with faeces. They have also been caught on video being poked at with brooms.

=== Turtle ===
A video of a turtle at the Phuket Zoo's Aquarium sparked controversy as its exhibit seemed to be too small for it to move around.

=== Bird Park ===
Some of the birds in the Bird Park were chained up and some guests said the bird's cages were too small and overcrowded.

=== Drugging of animals ===
Due to the fact that many animals were in close contact with humans, many have speculated that the animals were drugged to prevent them from harming visitors.

=== Inadequate exhibits ===
Many of the animal's exhibits, including those of the ostriches and deer, had no grass, shrubbery or enrichment toys. The Asiatic black bear enclosure was just a concrete pit.

== Efforts to change or close the Phuket Zoo ==
Animal rights groups such as PETA called on the zoo to "Improve the Living Conditions of the Animals..." There were also plenty of petitions online including one on Change.org calling for Phuket Zoo to be shut down.

== Animal list ==
- Crocodile
- Asian elephant
- Sumatran tiger
- Toucan
- Hawk
- Ostrich
- Emu
- Asiatic black bear
- White-tailed deer
- Plains zebra
- Giraffe
- Yak
- Wildebeest
- Spotted deer
- Turtle
- Fish
- Crabs
- Macaque monkey
- Gibbon
- Parrot
- Frog
- Lizard
- Peacock
- Snakes
- Otters
