= Donghuamen Night Market =

Market in Beijing, China

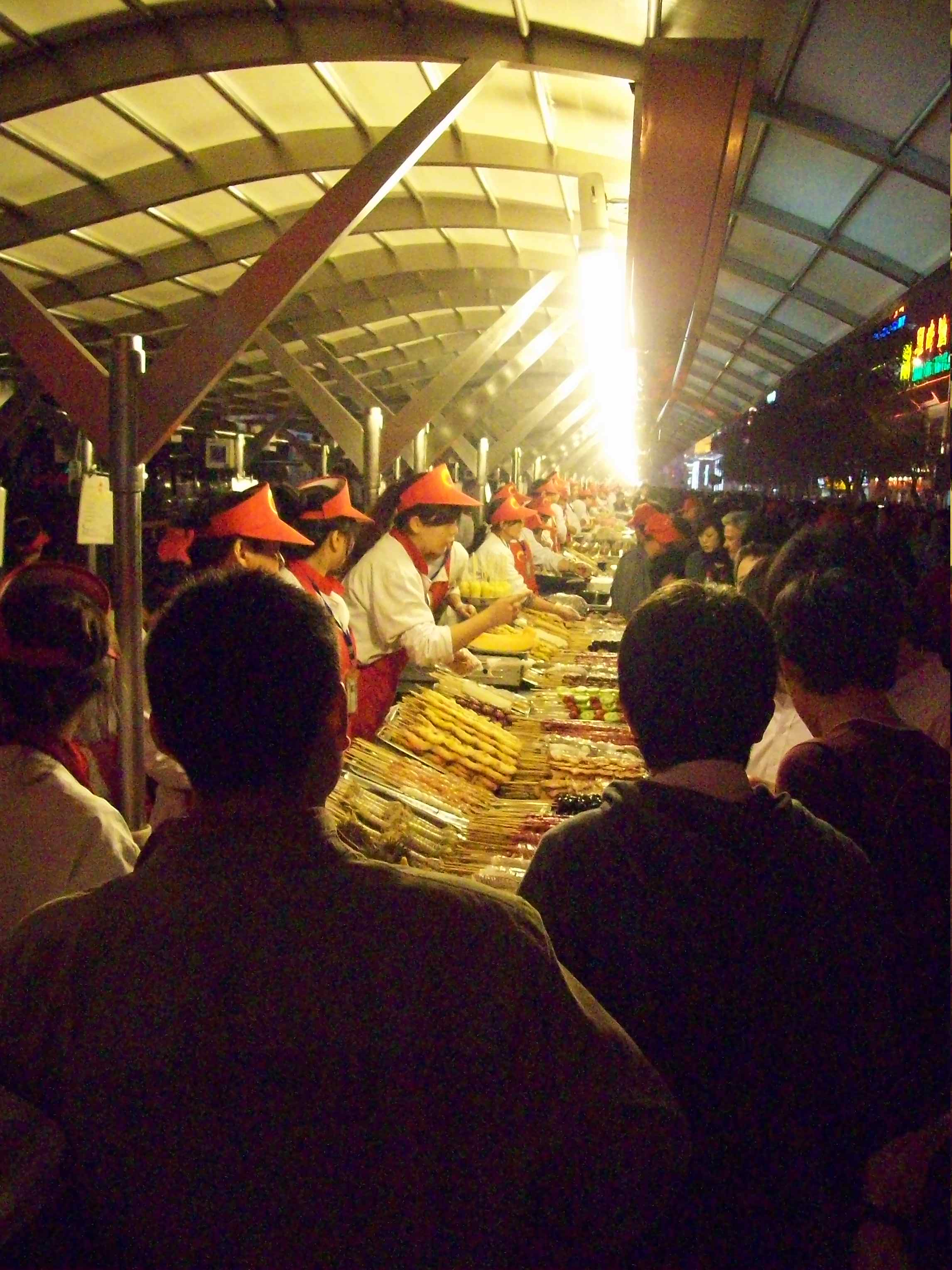
Donghuamen Night Market photo

Donghuamen Night Market was a night market located in the northern end of Wangfujing in Beijing, China. Dong Hua Men is written 东华门, the name of the East Gate of the Forbidden City.

== Description ==
The market hosted a row of unusual food stalls. Chinese food delicacies were available, including items such as sheep's particular parts, offal soup, deep fried crickets, centipedes, silk worms, scorpions, and lizards. Western foods such as spring rolls, dumplings, crab cakes and candy fruit were for sale. Stalls labeled their selections in both Chinese (Mandarin) and English. The food was displayed raw and can be deep fried in a wok upon request.

== Closure ==
Due to hygiene and noise complaints, the Donghuamen market closed on 24 June 2016.

== See also ==
- Wangfujing
