= The Amazing Race 15 =

Season of television series

- Season 15
- Region 1 DVD cover
- Presented by: Phil Keoghan
- No. of teams: 12
- Winners: Meghan Rickey & Cheyne Whitney
- No. of legs: 12
- Distance traveled: 25,000 mi (40,000 km)
- No. of episodes: 11

Release
- Original network: CBS
- Original release: September 27 – December 6, 2009

Additional information
- Filming dates: July 18 – August 7, 2009

Series chronology
- ← Previous; Season 14 Next → Season 16

The Amazing Race 15 is the fifteenth season of the American reality competition show The Amazing Race. Hosted by Phil Keoghan, it featured twelve teams of two, each with a pre-existing relationship, competing in a race around the world to win US$1,000,000. This season visited three continents and nine countries and traveled over 25,000 miles (40,000 km) during twelve legs. Starting in Los Angeles, racers traveled through Japan, Vietnam, Cambodia, the United Arab Emirates, the Netherlands, Sweden, Estonia, and the Czech Republic before returning to the United States and finishing in Las Vegas. New twists introduced in this season include the starting line task and elimination and the Switchback, a recreation of a notable task from a previous season. The season premiered on CBS on September 27, 2009, and concluded on December 6, 2009.

Dating couple Meghan Rickey and Cheyne Whitney were the winners of this season, while brothers Sam and Dan McMillen finished in second place, and married couple Brian Kleinschmidt and Ericka Dunlap finished in third place.

== Production ==
=== Development and filming ===
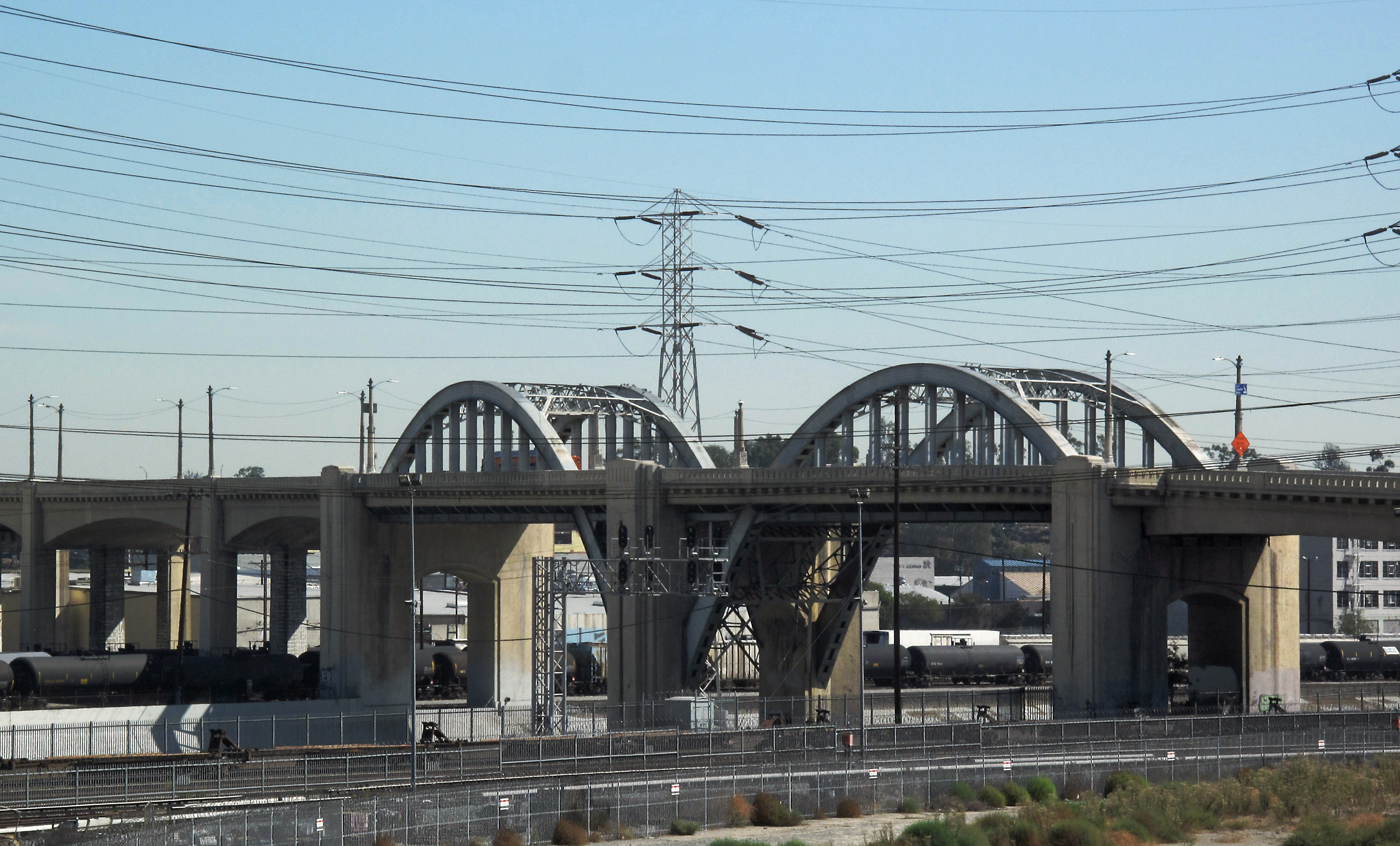
Beneath the Sixth Street Viaduct on the Los Angeles River between Downtown Los Angeles and the Boyle Heights neighborhood, teams began The Amazing Race 15.

CBS aired the fifteenth season during the start of the 2009–2010 television season. Teams were spotted at Los Angeles International Airport on July 18, 2009. Teams raced through the Dutch province of Groningen on July 30. A leg was also filmed in Tallinn, Estonia, on August 3. Filming lasted for 21 days and concluded on August 7 in Las Vegas. Teams traveled 25,000 miles (40,000 km), visiting eight countries, including first-time visits to Estonia and the Czech Republic.

This season introduced two new twists: a Starting Line Task and a Switchback. The Starting Line Task forced teams to complete a challenge before receiving the clue to their first international destination. The Switchback allowed teams to face one of the series' most memorable or iconic challenges from previous seasons. The Switchback that debuted on Leg 8 revisited the infamous Roadblock in Sweden from season 6, in which one team member had to sort through hay bales to find their next clue.

This was the second season since season 10 to feature a surprise elimination at a location other than a Pit Stop, which occurred at the Starting Line. Eric and Lisa Paskel were eliminated at the starting line when they were the last team to locate the required Shinagawa license plate amongst 1,000 Japanese license plates. They revealed in a post-show interview that they voluntarily left instead of spending the duration of the race at the Elimination Station. Consequently, they had no further involvement in the show, were absent from the finish line in the final episode, and had no knowledge of the outcome of the season before the season finale actually aired.

Wayne Newton appeared in the season finale. Teams were instructed to find him in a suite at the MGM Grand Las Vegas, where he then gave them the location of the finish line.

=== Casting ===
Casting calls were held as host Phil Keoghan cycled across the United States during the months of April and early May 2009 to support the National Multiple Sclerosis Society, during which Keoghan made stops to help with those casting sessions.

== Contestants ==
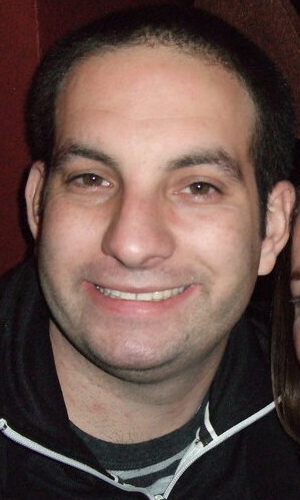
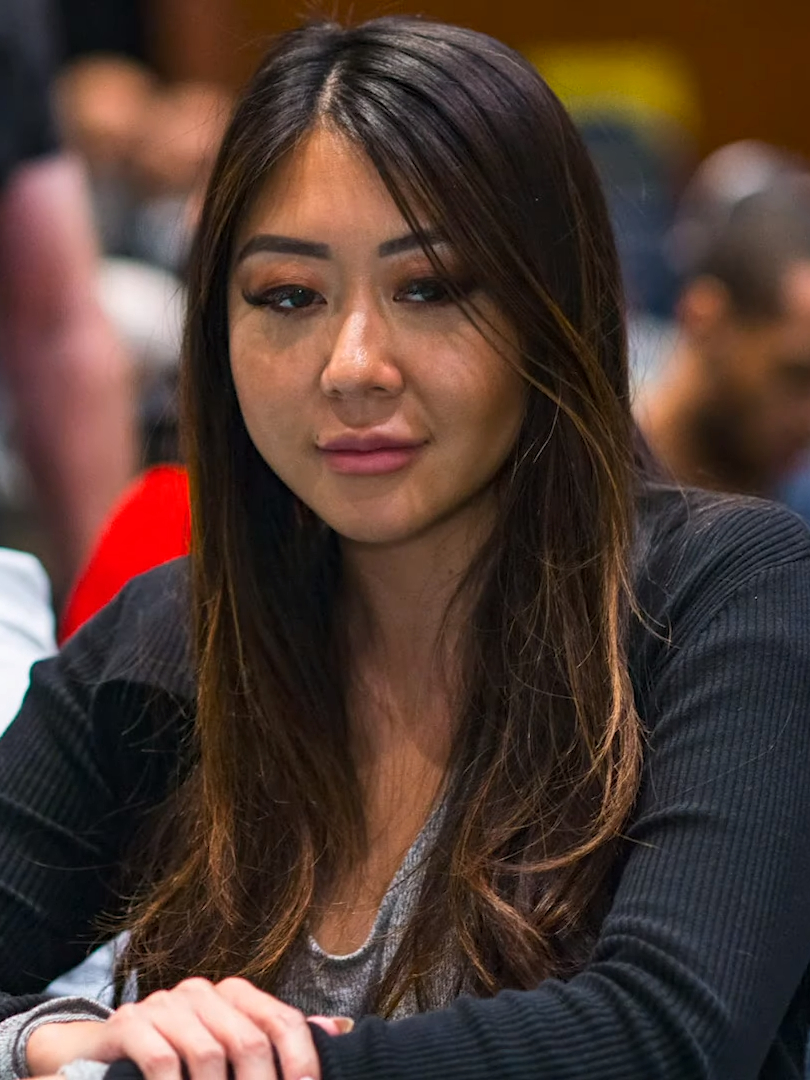
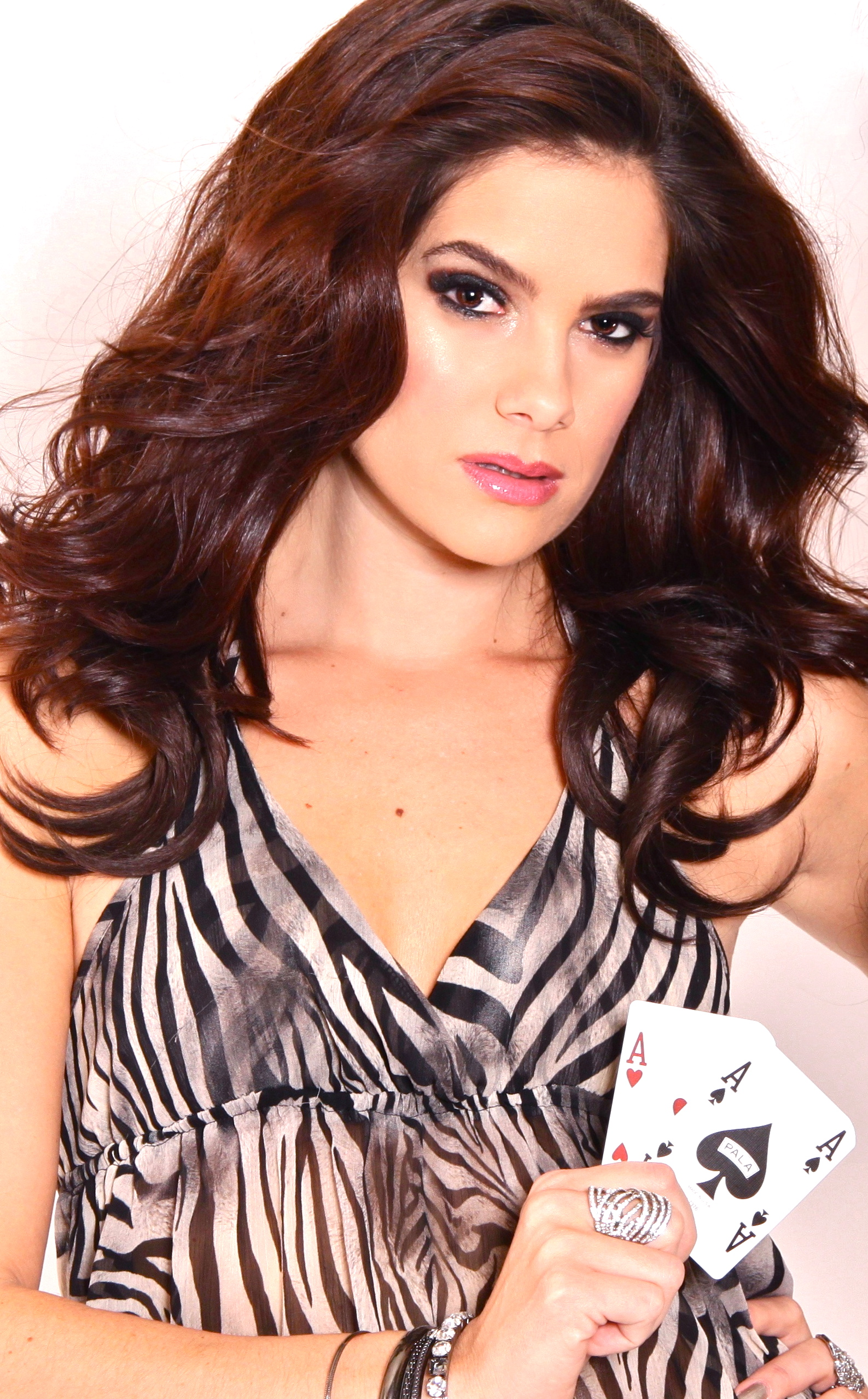
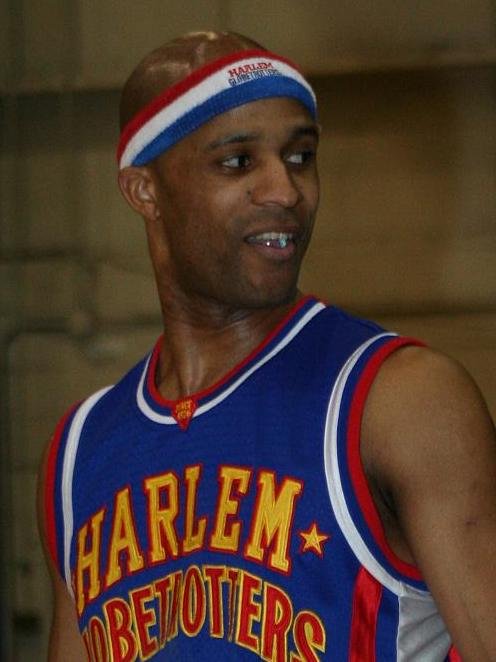
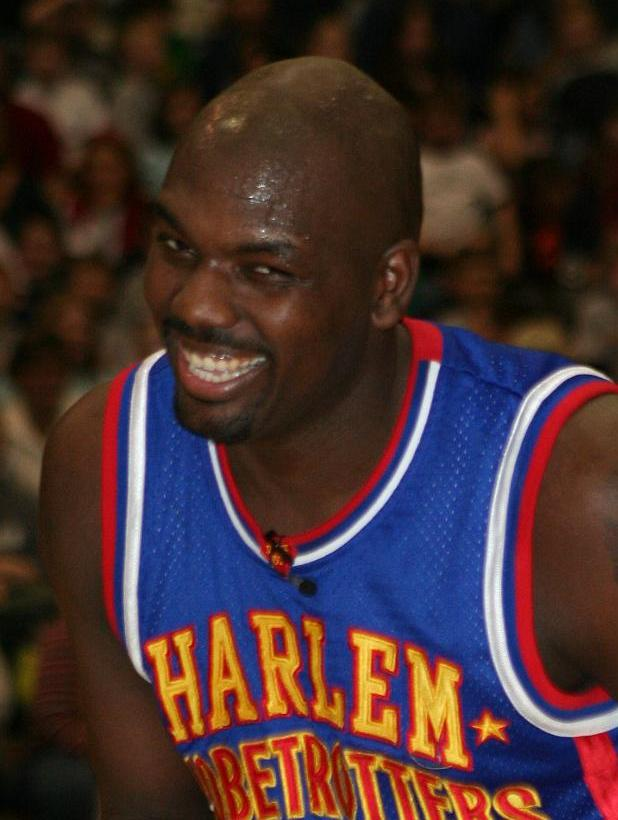
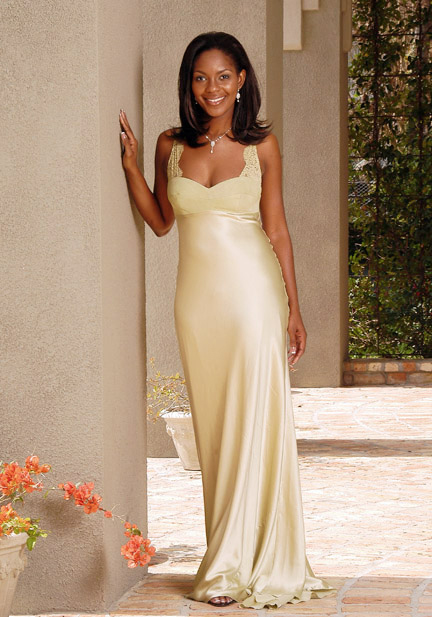
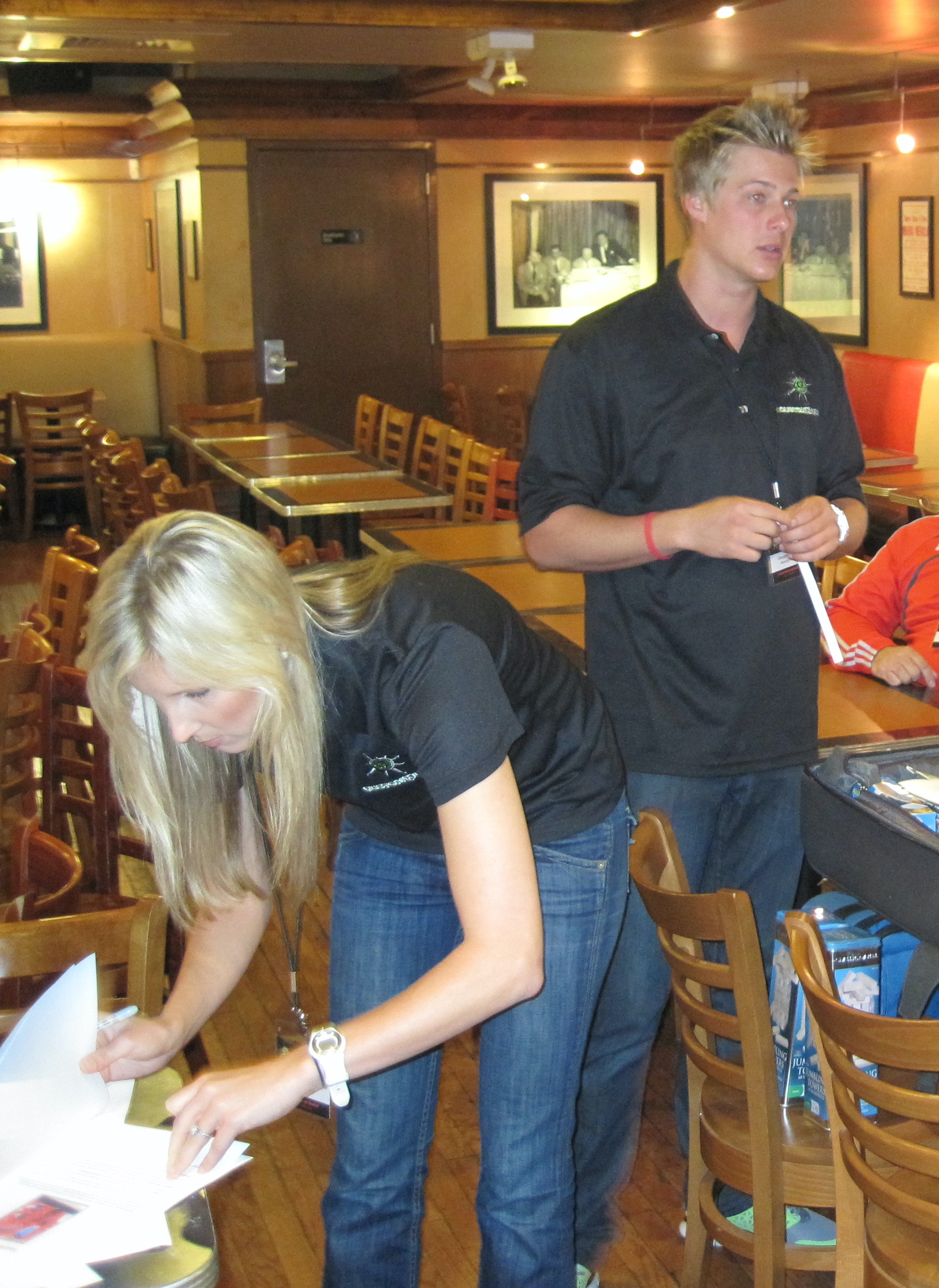
From left to right: Zev Glassenberg, Maria Ho, Tiffany Michelle, "Flight Time" Lang, "Big Easy" Lofton, Ericka Dunlap, Meghan Rickey, and Cheyne Whitney

Some of the more prominent members of the cast included professional poker players Maria Ho and Tiffany Michelle, Miss America 2004 Ericka Dunlap, Harlem Globetrotters Herbert "Flight Time" Lang and Nathaniel "Big Easy" Lofton, and country singer-songwriter Canaan Smith. Zev Glassenberg is the show's first autistic contestant having been diagnosed with Asperger's syndrome.

| Contestants | Age | Relationship | Hometown | Status |
|---|---|---|---|---|
| Eric Paskel | 41 | Married Yoga Teachers | Encino, California | Eliminated 1st (in Los Angeles, California) |
| Lisa Paskel | 43 | Married Yoga Teachers | Encino, California | Eliminated 1st (in Los Angeles, California) |
| Garrett Paul | 28 | Dating On & Off | Santa Cruz, California | Eliminated 2nd (in Cái Bè, Vietnam) |
| Jessica Stout | 27 | Dating On & Off | San Francisco, California | Eliminated 2nd (in Cái Bè, Vietnam) |
| Marcy Malloy | 60 | Dating | San Francisco, California | Eliminated 3rd (in Ho Chi Minh City, Vietnam) |
| Ron Shalita | 59 | Dating | San Francisco, California | Eliminated 3rd (in Ho Chi Minh City, Vietnam) |
| Zev Glassenberg | 26 | Friends | Sherman Oaks, California | Eliminated 4th (in Phnom Penh, Cambodia) |
| Justin Kanew | 30 | Friends | Los Angeles, California | Eliminated 4th (in Phnom Penh, Cambodia) |
| Lance Layne | 41 | Engaged | Salem, Massachusetts | Eliminated 5th (in Dubai, United Arab Emirates) |
| Keri Morrione | 33 | Engaged | Peabody, Massachusetts | Eliminated 5th (in Dubai, United Arab Emirates) |
| Mika Combs | 22 | Newly Dating | Nashville, Tennessee | Eliminated 6th (in Palm Jumeirah, United Arab Emirates) |
| Canaan Smith | 26 | Newly Dating | Nashville, Tennessee | Eliminated 6th (in Palm Jumeirah, United Arab Emirates) |
| Maria Ho | 26 | Professional Poker Players | Arcadia, California | Eliminated 7th (in Vierhuizen, Netherlands) |
| Tiffany Michelle | 25 | Professional Poker Players | Los Angeles, California | Eliminated 7th (in Vierhuizen, Netherlands) |
| Gary Tomljenovich | 47 | Father & Son | Laurel, Montana | Eliminated 8th (in Keava, Estonia) |
| Matt Tomljenovich | 22 | Father & Son | Bozeman, Montana | Eliminated 8th (in Keava, Estonia) |
| Herbert "Flight Time" Lang | 32 | Harlem Globetrotters | Brinkley, Arkansas | Eliminated 9th (in Prague, Czech Republic) |
| Nathaniel "Big Easy" Lofton | 28 | Harlem Globetrotters | New Orleans, Louisiana | Eliminated 9th (in Prague, Czech Republic) |
| Brian Kleinschmidt | 27 | Married | Nashville, Tennessee | Third place |
| Ericka Dunlap | 27 | Married | Nashville, Tennessee | Third place |
| Sam McMillen | 23 | Brothers | Liberty, Missouri | Runners-up |
| Dan McMillen | 21 | Brothers | Liberty, Missouri | Runners-up |
| Meghan Rickey | 23 | Dating | San Diego, California | Winners |
| Cheyne Whitney | 23 | Dating | San Diego, California | Winners |

Future appearances

Zev & Justin and Flight Time & Big Easy raced again in The Amazing Race: Unfinished Business. Flight Time & Big Easy were also chosen to compete in the second All-Stars edition. Flight Time and Big Easy appeared on The Amazing Race: 25 Years Around the World.

In 2010, Flight Time & Big Easy each competed on Are You Smarter than a 5th Grader?. Tiffany Michelle later competed on season 3 of Food Network's Worst Cooks in America. Brian Kleinschmidt appeared on season 7 of ABC's Shark Tank to secure funding for a potty training product called "EZPeeZ", but was unable to secure a deal. On May 25, 2016, Flight Time & Big Easy appeared on an Amazing Race-themed primetime special of The Price Is Right. In 2019, Maria Ho appeared as an imposter on To Tell the Truth. In 2020, Brian hosted the HGTV show 100 Day Dream Home with his wife Mika. Flight Time & Big Easy also appeared on 100 Day Dream Home in 2021. In 2021, Brian competed on the HGTV show Rock the Block.

== Results ==
The following teams are listed with their placements in each leg. Placements are listed in finishing order.

- A red placement with a dagger (†) indicates that the team was eliminated.
- An underlined blue placement with a double-dagger (‡) indicates that the team was the last to arrive at a Pit Stop in a non-elimination leg, and had to perform a Speed Bump task in the following leg.
- A green ƒ indicates that the team won the Fast Forward.

Team placement (by leg)
| Team | 1 | 2 | 3 | 4 | 5 | 6 | 7 | 8 | 9 | 10 | 11 | 12 |
|---|---|---|---|---|---|---|---|---|---|---|---|---|
| Meghan & Cheyne | 1st | 6th | 2nd | 5th | 1stƒ (Note: This team won the Fast Forward on this leg.) | 1st | 2nd | 2nd | 1st | 1st | 1st | 1st |
| Sam & Dan | 9th | 2nd | 5th | 1st | 5th | 3rd | 1st | 4th | 2nd | 2nd | 2nd | 2nd |
| Brian & Ericka | 6th | 10th | 4th | 3rd | 2nd | 4th | 5th | 3rd | 4th | 4th‡ | 3rd | 3rd |
| Flight Time & Big Easy | 5th | 3rd | 1st | 2nd | 3rd | 6th | 3rd | 1st | 3rd | 3rd | 4th† | |
| Gary & Matt | 7th | 1st | 3rd | 4th | 4th | 5th | 4th | 5th‡ | 5th† | | | |
| Maria & Tiffany | 11th‡ | 7th | 6th | 8th | 6th | 2nd | 6th† | | | | | |
| Mika & Canaan | 10th | 8th | 7th | 7th | 7th | 7th† | | | | | | |
| Lance & Keri | 3rd | 4th | 9th | 6th | 8th† | | | | | | | |
| Zev & Justin | 2nd | 5th | 8th | 9th† (Note: Zev & Justin initially arrived 1st, but discovered that Zev did not have his passport and they could not check in until they found it. All of the other teams checked into the Pit Stop in the meantime, dropping Zev & Justin to last.) | | | | | | | | |
| Marcy & Ron | 4th | 9th | 10th† | | | | | | | | | |
| Garrett & Jessica | 8th | 11th† | | | | | | | | | | |
| Eric & Lisa | 12th† (Note: Eric & Lisa were eliminated at the starting line.) | | | | | | | | | | | |

== Race summary ==
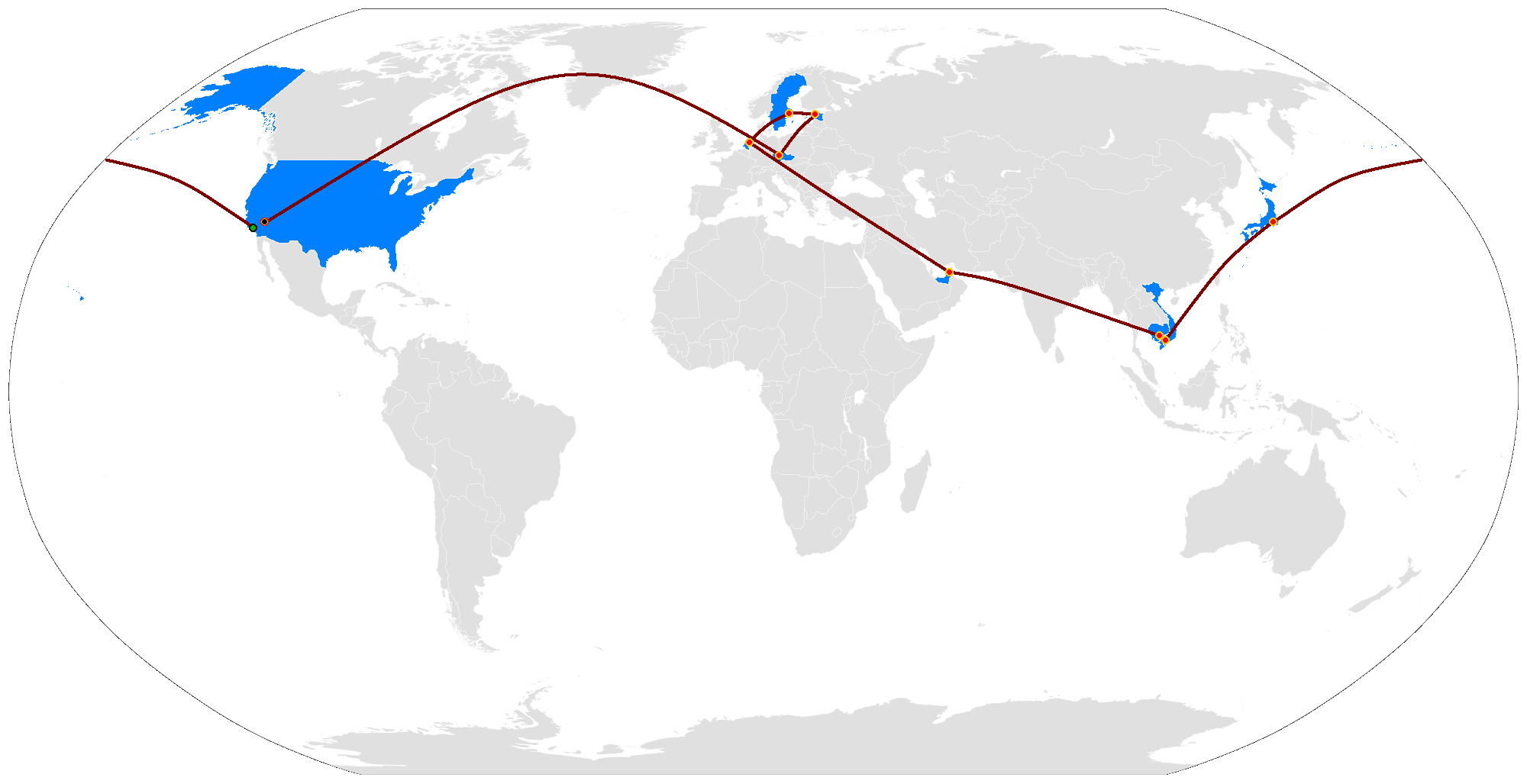
The route of The Amazing Race 15.

| Destinations | Air travel Rail travel Water travel Bus travel Helicopter travel Bicycle travel Gondola travel |
| Route Markers | Detour Roadblock Fast Forward Speed Bump Pit Stop |

=== Leg 1 (United States → Japan) ===
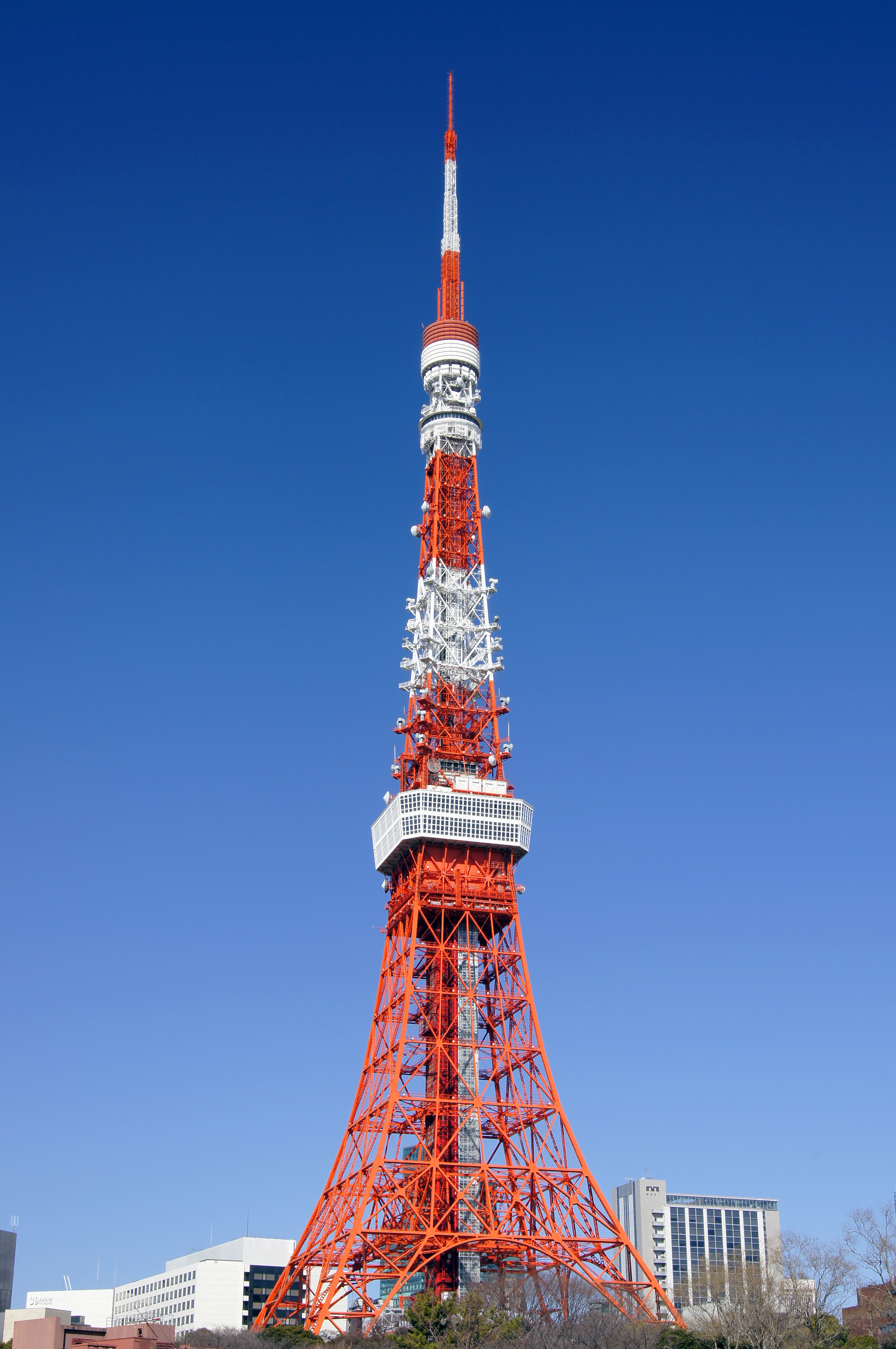
After arriving in Tokyo, teams gathered at a television studio at the base of the Tokyo Tower to compete in a Japanese game show for the Roadblock.

- Episode 1: "They Thought Godzilla Was Walking Down the Street" (September 27, 2009)
- Prize: A trip for two to Aspen and Vail, Colorado (awarded to Meghan & Cheyne)
- Eliminated: Eric & Lisa

Locations

- Los Angeles, California (Los Angeles River) (Starting Line & Elimination Point)
- Los Angeles → Tokyo, Japan
- Tokyo (Tokyo Tower Studios)
- Tokyo (Shibuya Scramble Crossing)
- Tokyo (Konnō Hachimangū Shrine (in Japanese))

Episode summary

- At the Los Angeles River, beneath the Sixth Street Viaduct, teams had to search through 1,000 license plates for one of 11 Japanese license plates from Shinagawa and then present it to Phil in exchange for tickets on one of two flights to Tokyo, Japan. The first six teams to find the correct plate received tickets on an American Airlines flight that left thirty minutes before the United Airlines flight that carried the other five teams. The last team at the starting line without a license plate – Eric & Lisa – was eliminated. Once there, teams had to travel to the base of the Tokyo Tower.
- In this season's first Roadblock, one team member had to participate in a Japanese-style game show called Sushi Roulette. Once all of the teams arrived at the Roadblock, the host spun a wheel with eleven plates of sushi, two of which were "wasabi bombs": temaki-style sushi filled with hot wasabi. If the racer received a wasabi bomb, they had two minutes to eat it in order to receive their next clue. If they failed to finish it within the allotted time, they had to play again until they received a new wasabi bomb and could complete the task. Racers who received plain sushi had to eat the sushi, but continue to play until they received a wasabi bomb.
- After the Roadblock, teams received a colored flag and had to lead a group of twenty Japanese tourists wearing the same colored visors as their flag via the scramble crossing in Shibuya to the Pit Stop at the Konnō Hachimangū Shrine. Teams could not check in unless all twenty members of their group were present at the mat. If even one member of their group were not present, teams had to go back to find them before being allowed to check in.

Additional notes

- At the Tokyo Tower Studios, teams spent the night in a green room before proceeding to the Roadblock. This aspect was unaired.
- While Eric & Lisa were eliminated at the starting line, no team was eliminated at the Pit Stop, as this was deemed a non-elimination leg.

=== Leg 2 (Japan → Vietnam) ===
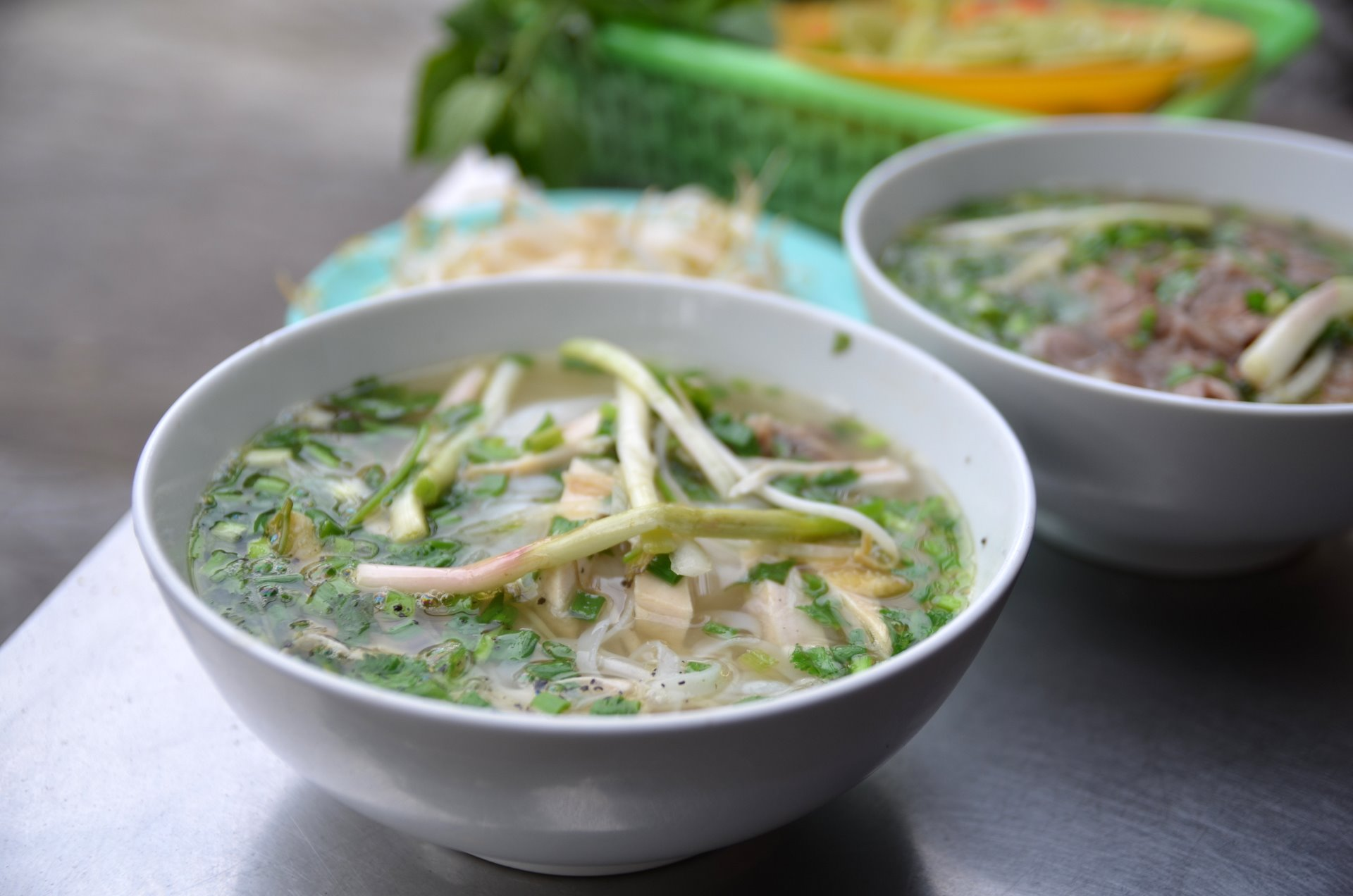
The Speed Bump for this leg tasked Maria & Tiffany with preparing a traditional Vietnamese soup, phở, while in Cái Bè.

- Episode 1: "They Thought Godzilla Was Walking Down the Street" (September 27, 2009)
- Prize: A kayak for each person (awarded to Gary & Matt)
- Eliminated: Garrett & Jessica

Locations

- Tokyo (Shinjuku Central Park)
- Tokyo → Ho Chi Minh City, Vietnam
- Ho Chi Minh City → Cái Bè
- Cái Bè (Bến Tàu Du Lịch Dock)
- Tân Phong Island (in Vietnamese) (Fruit Farm Mud Pits)
- Cái Bè (Cái Bè Township Sports Ground)
- Cái Bè (Mekong River – Bassac III Riverboat)

Episode summary

- At the start of this leg, teams were instructed to fly to Ho Chi Minh City, Vietnam. Once there, teams had to travel by bus to Cái Bè and then find their next clue at the Bến Tàu Du Lịch Dock.
- For their Speed Bump, Maria & Tiffany had to prepare a serving of the Vietnamese soup phở by collecting the ingredients at a soup stand, combining them, and then serving the completed soup to the dock master before they could continue racing.
- From the dock, teams had to take a sampan along the Mekong Delta to a fruit farm mud pit. There, teams had to collect nutrient-rich mud in buckets and sufficiently pile it at the base of a fruit tree in order to receive their next clue. Teams were then directed to the Cái Bè Township Sports Ground, where they found their next clue.
- In this leg's Roadblock, one team member had to herd 150 ducks out of their pen, lead them across a bridge and back, and then herd them back into their pen in ten minutes using two flags to guide them. With only six available fields, if the team member failed to complete the task within ten minutes, they had to relinquish their spot to another team before they could start over. Once racers completed the task, they received their next clue, which directed them to the Pit Stop: the Bassac III riverboat, floating on the Mekong River.

Additional notes

- All route markers and clue boxes in Vietnam were colored yellow with a center white stripe rather than the typical yellow with a red stripe so as to avoid confusion with the flag of the former independent state of South Vietnam.
- Legs 1 and 2 aired back-to-back as a special two-hour episode.

=== Leg 3 (Vietnam) ===
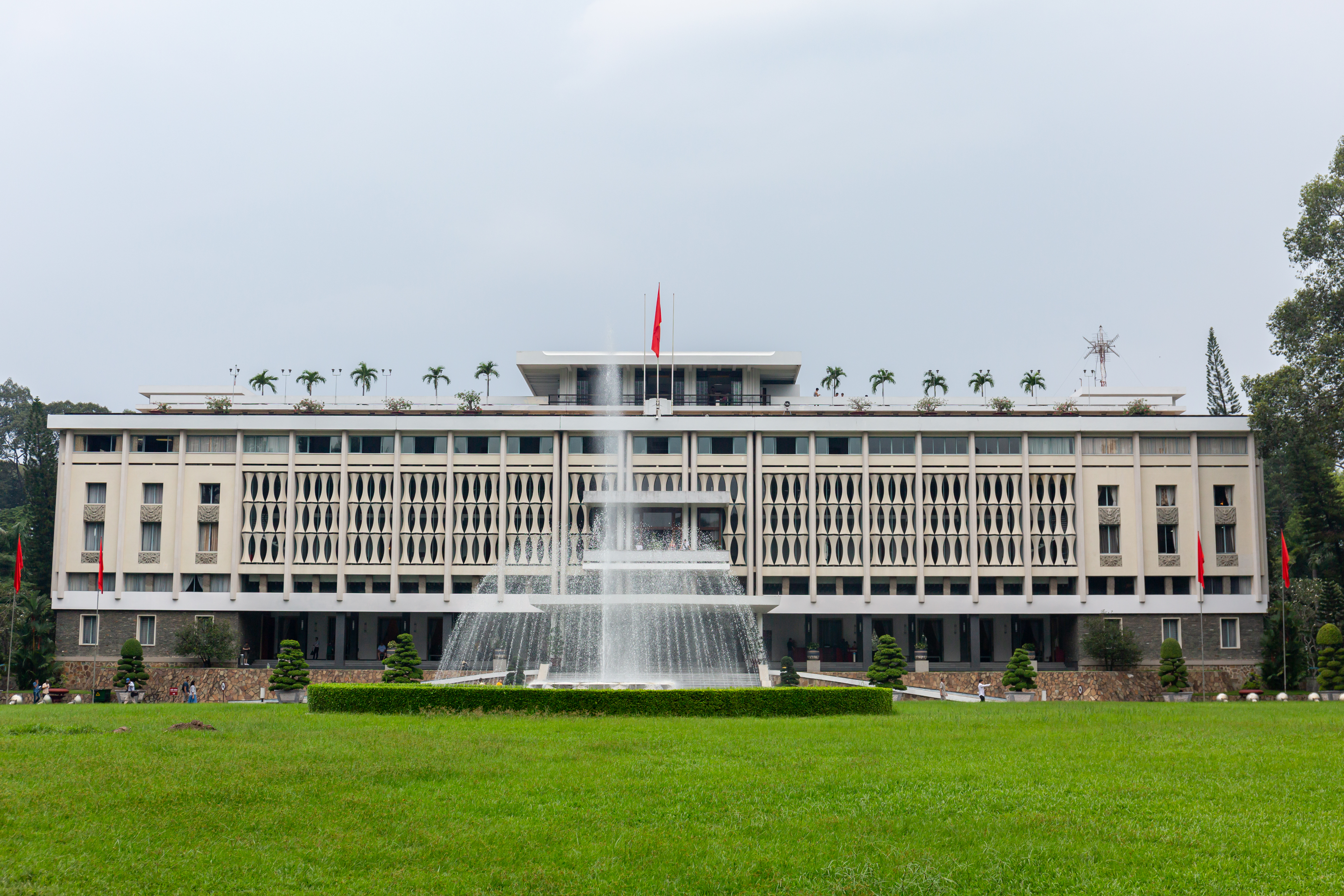
Teams ended the second leg in Ho Chi Minh City at the Reunification Palace, which was once the seat of power in former South Vietnam.

- Episode 2: "It's Like Being Dropped on Planet Mars" (October 4, 2009)
- Prize: A trip for two to Aruba (awarded to Flight Time & Big Easy)
- Eliminated: Marcy & Ron

Locations

- Cái Bè → Mỹ Tho (Mỹ Tho Boat Pier)
- Ho Chi Minh City (Golden Dragon Water Puppet Theatre)
- Ho Chi Minh City (Ho Chi Minh City Post Office)
- Ho Chi Minh City (Tao Đàn Park or Hotel A Dong)
- Ho Chi Minh City (Điện Cơ 008)
- Ho Chi Minh City (Reunification Palace)

Episode summary

- During the Pit Stop, the Bassac III traveled from Cái Bè to Mỹ Tho. At the start of this leg, teams had to travel to the Golden Dragon Water Puppet Theatre in Ho Chi Minh City. There, teams had to grab an Amazing Race-colored ribbon from the mouth of a dragon puppet moving about in the water. Inside the ribbon was a small metal capsule with a concealed postage stamp and teams to figure out that the stamp depicted the Saigon Central Post Office (referred to as the "Ho Chi Minh City Post Office"), where teams found their next clue.
- This season's first Detour was a choice between Child's Play or Word Play. In Child's Play, teams had to find a kiosk in Tao Đàn Park and deliver a concrete animal statue to a playground, along with five balloons that they collected en route, in order to receive their next clue. In Word Play, teams had to go up to the observation deck of the Hotel A Dong and search the traffic circle of Ngã sáu Cộng Hoà (a six-way intersection) in front of the hotel for six Vietnamese letters hidden atop vehicles passing through the circle. Once a security guard verified their letters, teams had to get assistance from locals to unscramble the letters to spell the Vietnamese word Độc Lập (Independence) in order to receive their next clue.
- After the Detour, teams had to travel to Điện Cơ 008 in order to find their next clue.
- In this leg's Roadblock, one team member had to disassemble two VCRs and organize the parts into separate piles in order to receive their next clue directing them to the Pit Stop: the Reunification Palace.

=== Leg 4 (Vietnam → Cambodia) ===
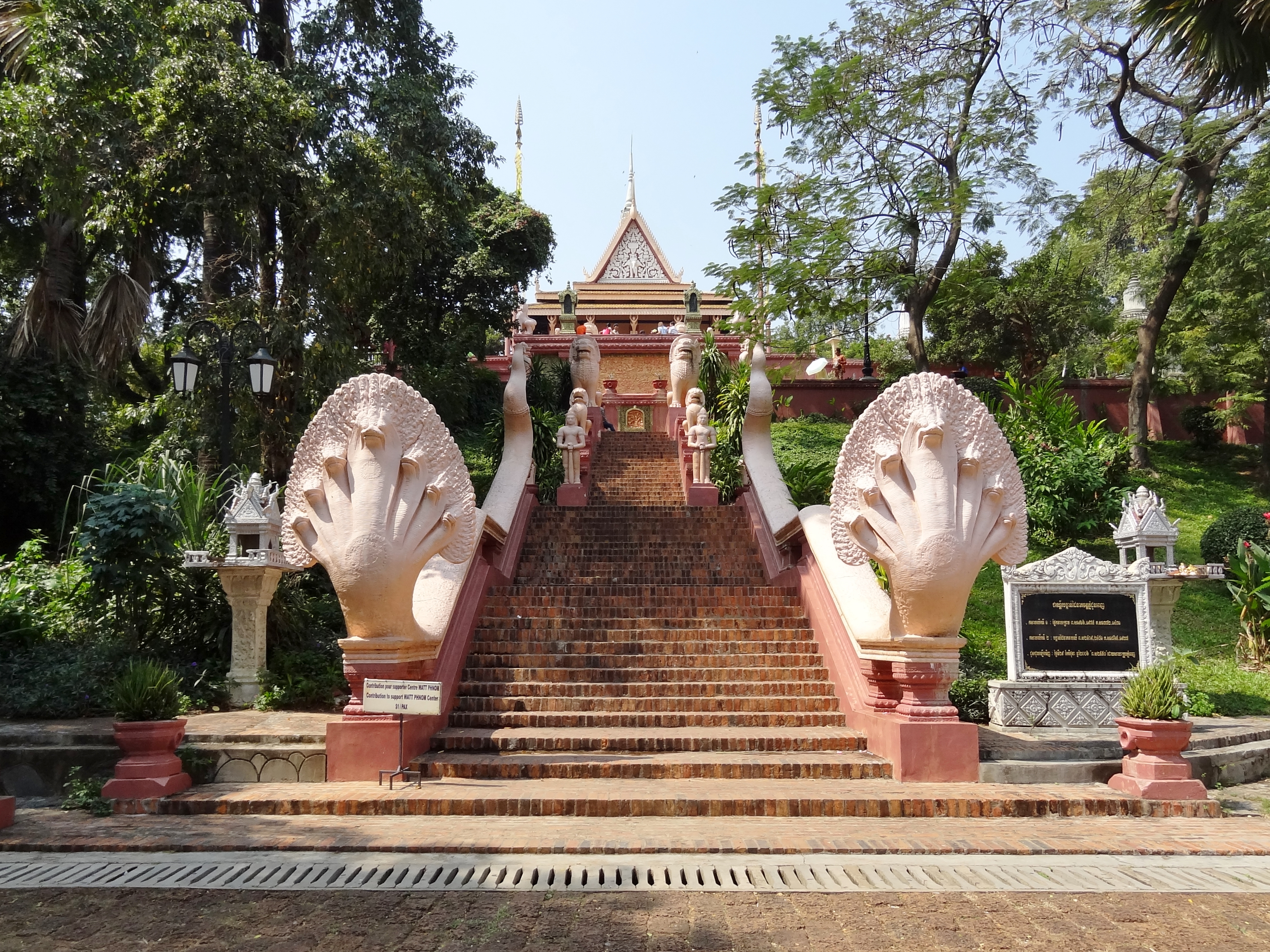
Teams ended the leg in Phnom Penh at Wat Phnom, which served as the fourth Pit Stop.

- Episode 3: "Sean Penn Cambodia Here We Come" (October 11, 2009)
- Prize: A pair of motorcycles (awarded to Sam & Dan)
- Eliminated: Zev & Justin

Locations

- Ho Chi Minh City (Reunification Palace)
- Ho Chi Minh City → Phnom Penh, Cambodia
- Phnom Penh (Foreign Correspondents' Club)
- Phnom Penh (Hotel Le Royal)
- Phnom Penh (Russian Market (in Khmer))
- Phnom Penh (Wat Toul Tom Pong)
- Phnom Penh (Wat Phnom)

Episode summary

- At the start of this leg, teams were instructed to fly to Phnom Penh, Cambodia. Once start, teams had to travel to the Foreign Correspondents' Club, find an assignment editor reading a newspaper, and then quietly ask him for their next assignment. Teams were given a newspaper with a photo of King Norodom Sihanouk and Jacqueline Kennedy taken in 1967. Teams were directed to find a suite with this photo and had to figure out that such a photo would be found at a hotel suite named after Kennedy at the Hotel Le Royal, where they received their next clue.
- This leg's Detour was a choice between Cover or Wrap. In Cover, teams traveled to a motorcycle helmet shop located at the Russian Market, chose four helmets, and had to sell them to a family of four for US$10. They then had to exchange the money with the store owner for their next clue. In Wrap, teams had to travel to the Russian Market and find a specific stall, where the shopkeeper handed them a silk scarf. They then had to search the market for a woman wearing an identical scarf and bring the woman back to the stall in order to receive their next clue.
- After the Detour, teams had to travel to Wat Toul Tom Pong, where they found their next clue.
- In this leg's Roadblock, one team member had to put on a monkey mask and tail and perform three classical Khmer monkey dance maneuvers as demonstrated by a monkey dancer in order to receive their next clue directing them to the Pit Stop: Wat Phnom.

Additional note

- Zev & Justin originally arrived at the Pit Stop first, but they realized shortly thereafter that Zev had lost his passport. Zev & Justin were unable to find the passport before all of the other teams checked in and were therefore eliminated. Zev's passport was later recovered at the U.S. Embassy in Phnom Penh after somebody had found it at and turned it in.

=== Leg 5 (Cambodia → United Arab Emirates) ===
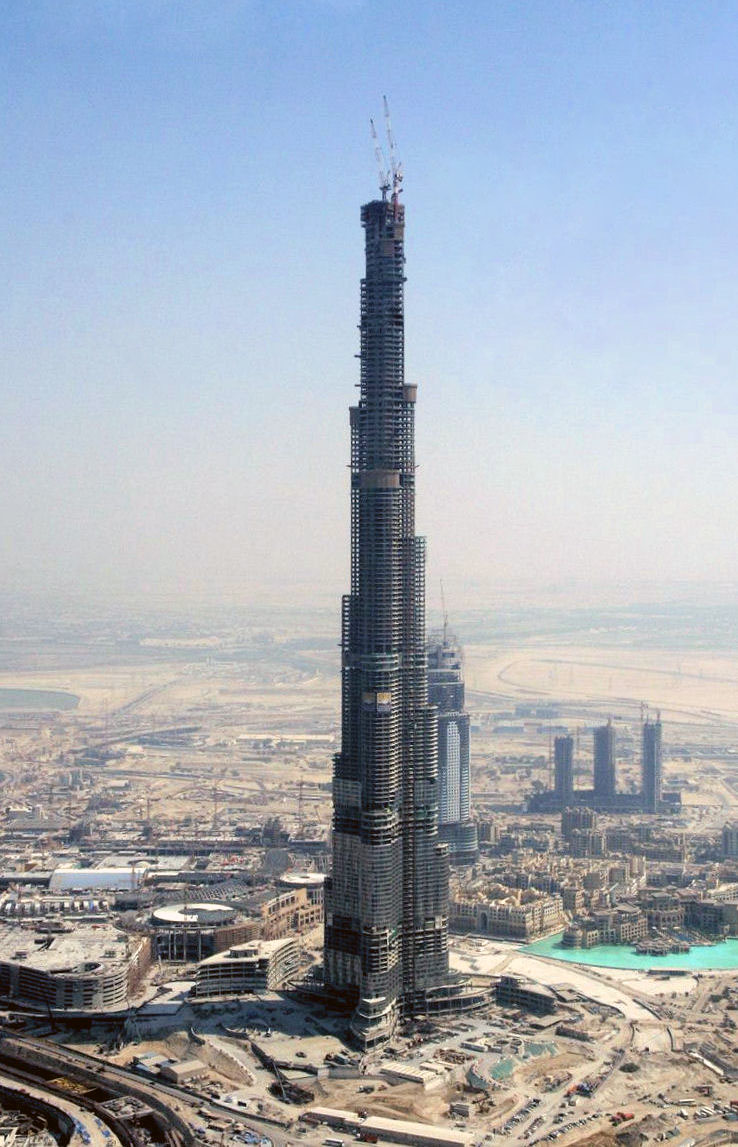
Teams had to ascend to the 124th floor of the under-construction Burj Dubai in order to find their next clue while in Dubai.

- Episode 4: "I'm Like Ricky Bobby" (October 18, 2009)
- Prize: A trip for two to Runaway Bay, Jamaica (awarded to Meghan & Cheyne)
- Eliminated: Lance & Keri

Locations

- Phnom Penh (Hotel Le Royal)
- Phnom Penh → Dubai, United Arab Emirates
- Dubai (The Dubai Fountain)
- Dubai (Burj Dubai – Observation Deck)
- Dubai (Dubai Autodrome)
- Dubai (The Dubai Mall – Car Park P2)
- Margham (Dubai Desert Conservation Reserve)
- Dubai (Mall of the Emirates – Ski Dubai)
- Dubai (Souk Madinat Jumeirah)

Episode summary

- At the start of this leg, teams were only told to find the tallest building in the world in the Persian Gulf, and they had to figure out that their next destination was Dubai, United Arab Emirates. Once there, teams traveled to The Dubai Fountain and signed up for one of two departure times the next morning to the Burj Dubai. The next morning, teams boarded an elevator bound for the 124th floor of the then still-under-construction building, where they could retrieve their next clue.
- This season's only Fast Forward required teams to travel to the Dubai Autodrome, where one team member had to drive a Formula Three open wheel race car and complete a single lap around the track in 45 seconds or less. Meghan & Cheyne won the Fast Forward and were then driven to the Pit Stop in a Maserati.
- Teams who didn't choose the Fast Forward had to travel to a parking area in The Dubai Mall, search for a marked car, and then drive themselves to the Dubai Desert Conservation Reserve, where they were driven in a 4x4 vehicle to their next clue.
- In this leg's Roadblock, one team member had to pick a traditional water bag and search the desert reserve for a series of urns buried in the sand. Some of the urns contained water, while others were empty. When they filled their bag with water, they had to give it to a Bedouin in order to receive their next clue.
- After the Roadblock, teams had to drive to the Mall of the Emirates and find their next clue at Ski Dubai.
- This leg's Detour was a choice between Build a Snowman or Find a Snowman. In Build a Snowman, teams had to carry snow outside, where the temperature was approximately 120 °F (49 °C), and then build a complete snowman before the snow melted in order to receive their next clue. In Find a Snowman, teams had to ride a ski lift to the top of the artificial mountain, sled down to the bottom, and dig through a mound of snow for a buried toy snowman. When teams found one, they had to give it to a person in a polar bear suit in exchange for their next clue.
- After the Detour, teams had to check in at the Pit Stop: Souk Madinat Jumeirah.

=== Leg 6 (United Arab Emirates) ===
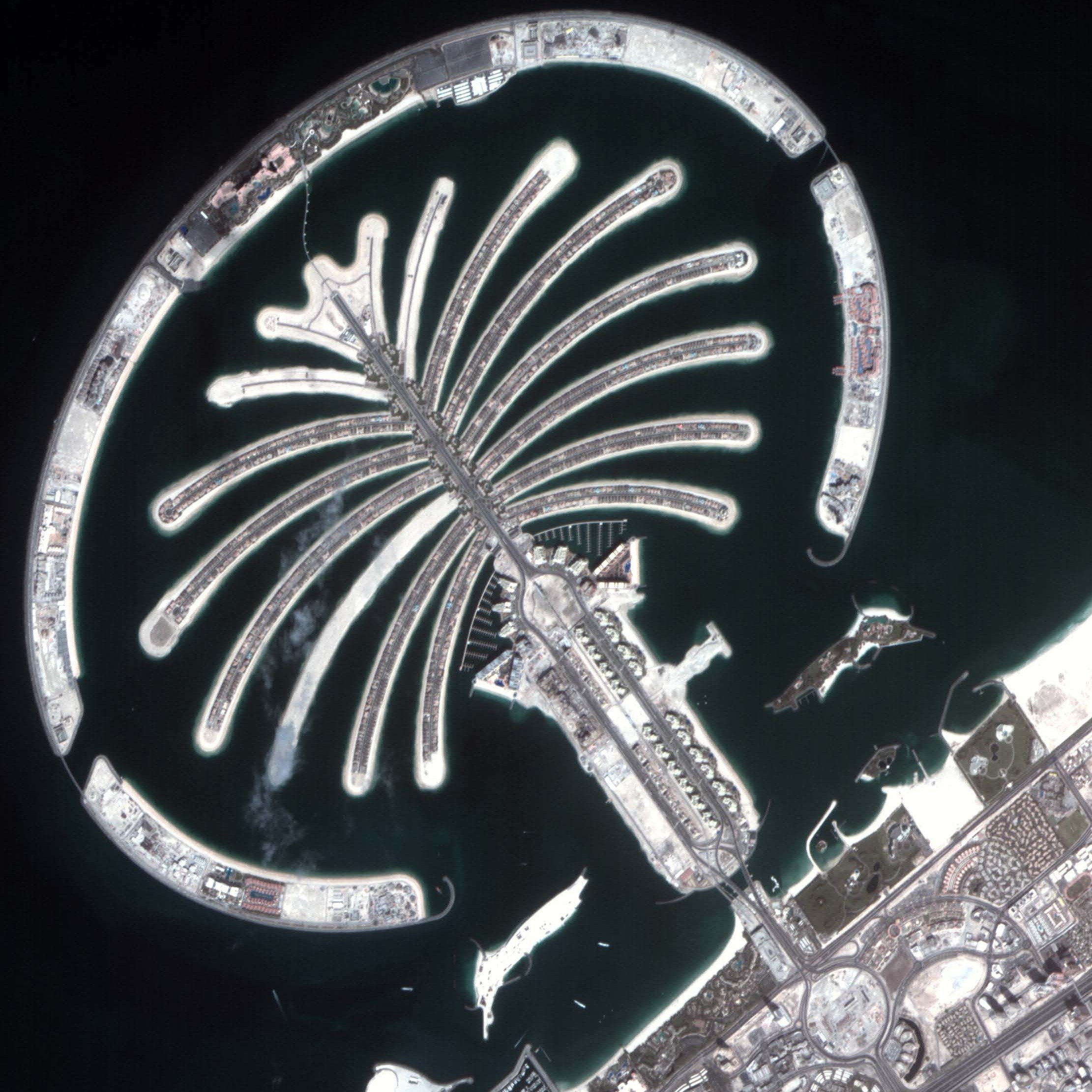
While in Dubai, teams visited the Atlantis, The Palm resort, located at the apex of the artificial Palm Jumeirah islands.

- Episode 5: "Do It for the Hood! Do It for the Suburbs!" (October 25, 2009)
- Prize: Two personal watercraft (awarded to Meghan & Cheyne)
- Eliminated: Mika & Canaan

Locations

- Dubai (Souk Madinat Jumeirah)
- Dubai (Dubai Creek – Dubai Creek Golf & Yacht Club)
- Dubai (Old Textile Souk Quarter – Abra Station)
- Dubai → Deira
- Dubai (Gold Souk – Deepu Jewellers or Spice Souk)
- Palm Jumeirah (Atlantis, The Palm – Aquaventure)
- Palm Jumeirah (Atlantis, The Palm – Dolphin Bay Beach)

Episode summary

- At the start of this leg at the Souk Madinat Jumeirah, teams had to pick up a locked briefcase and bring it with them to the Dubai Creek Golf & Yacht Club.
- In this leg's Roadblock, one team member had to row an inflatable dinghy out to a yacht anchored offshore and meet a sheikh, who gave them a watch. After rowing back to the dock, they had to figure out that the time displayed on the watch was the combination to the lock on the briefcase, which they had to open in order to retrieve their next clue.
- After the Roadblock, teams had to travel to the Old Textile Souk Quarter and then travel by abra across the Dubai Creek to the neighborhood of Deira, where they found their next clue.
- This leg's Detour was a choice between Gold or Glass. In Gold, teams had to find Deepu Jewellers in Deira's Gold Souk, where they used a precision scale to weigh out US$500,000 worth of gold to the nearest troy ounce in order to receive their next clue. The price of gold per ounce was displayed on a television monitor but could change by the minute. In Glass, teams traveled to the Spice Souk in Deira, where they had to open a crate and properly assemble twelve hookahs using all of the parts from the crate and three displayed hookahs as guides in order to receive their next clue.
- After the Detour, teams traveled to Aquaventure at Atlantis, The Palm, on Palm Jumeirah. There, both team members had to slide down the resort's Leap of Faith water slide, which dropped them six stories down a nearly 90° incline and through a tunnel beneath the aquarium's shark lagoon, before receiving their next clue. If multiple teams were at the top of the slide at the same time, the leading team had two minutes to go down the slide before relinquishing their spot. Teams could then check in at the nearby Pit Stop: Dolphin Bay Beach.

Additional notes

- Mika refused to go down the water slide at Aquaventure, which resulted in her and Canaan being eliminated.
- The water slide task was later referenced in season 28 during the Roadblock at Aquaventure, where teams rode a different water slide.

=== Leg 7 (United Arab Emirates → Netherlands) ===
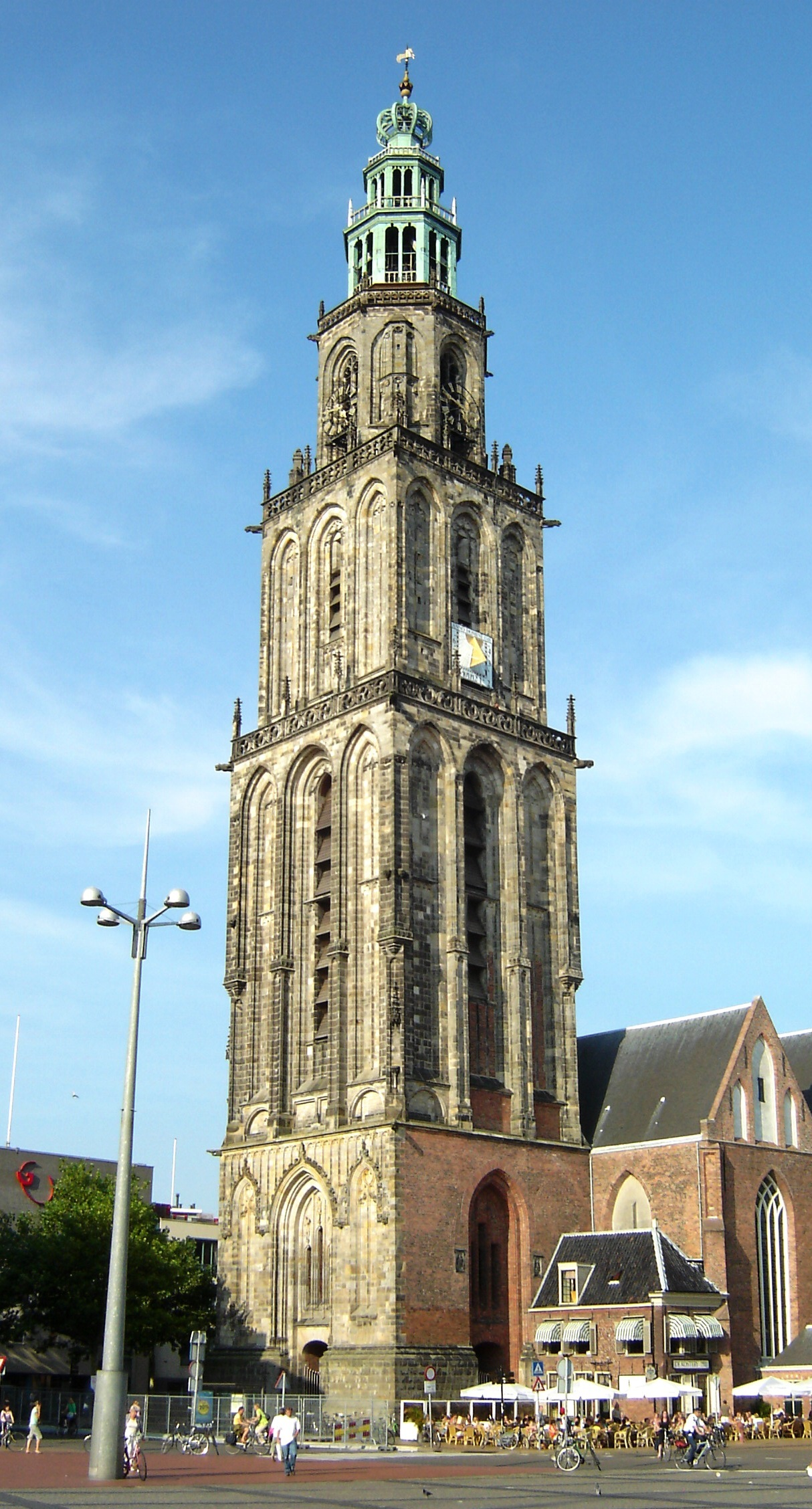
This leg's Roadblock required one team member to climb to the top of the Martinitoren and count the bells in the carillon.

- Episode 6: "This Is Not My Finest Hour" (November 1, 2009)
- Prize: A pair of dune buggies (awarded to Sam & Dan)
- Eliminated: Maria & Tiffany

Locations

- Palm Jumeirah (Atlantis, The Palm – Dolphin Bay Beach)
- Dubai → Amsterdam, Netherlands
- Den Oever (Afsluitdijk – Cornelis Lely Monument)
- Groningen (Martinitoren)
- Vierhuizen (De Onderneming Windmill (in Dutch))
- Zoutkamp (Harbor)

Episode summary

- At the start of this leg, teams were instructed to fly to Amsterdam, Netherlands. Once there, teams had to drive to the Cornelis Lely Monument on the Afsluitdijk and find their next clue, which directed teams to the Martinitoren in Groningen.
- In this leg's Roadblock, one team member had to climb to the top of the Martinitoren and count all of the bells in the carillon. When they provided the correct number to the carillonneur, they received their next clue; otherwise, they had to climb back up to the carillon to count again.
- After the Roadblock, teams had to travel to the De Onderneming Windmill in Vierhuizen in order to find their next clue.
- This leg's Detour required teams to don traditional Dutch costumes and ride bicycles to their Detour: Farmer's Game or Farmer's Dance. In Farmer's Game, teams had to strip down to their Dutch underwear and swim across a creek. On the other side, they had to retrieve a special set of golf clubs and play three holes of Farmersgolf. Team members took turns with each stroke and had to finish within par of eight strokes on each hole in order to receive their next clue. In Farmer's Dance, teams had to find a country festival, where one team member had to hit the bell on a high striker. Team members alternated until one team member successfully hit the bell. They then had to enter a dance hall and learn a traditional Dutch folk dance to perform in front of a crowd. If the dance was to the instructor's satisfaction, each team member was given a serving of soused herring, which they had to eat in order to receive their next clue.
- After the Detour, teams had to ride their bicycles to the Pit Stop at Zoutkamp Harbor.

Additional note

- Maria & Tiffany were unable to complete either of the Detour options and elected to quit the task, knowing that this would essentially mean quitting the race. After all of the other teams had checked in at the Pit Stop, Phil came out to the Detour to inform Maria & Tiffany that they were eliminated.

=== Leg 8 (Netherlands → Sweden) ===
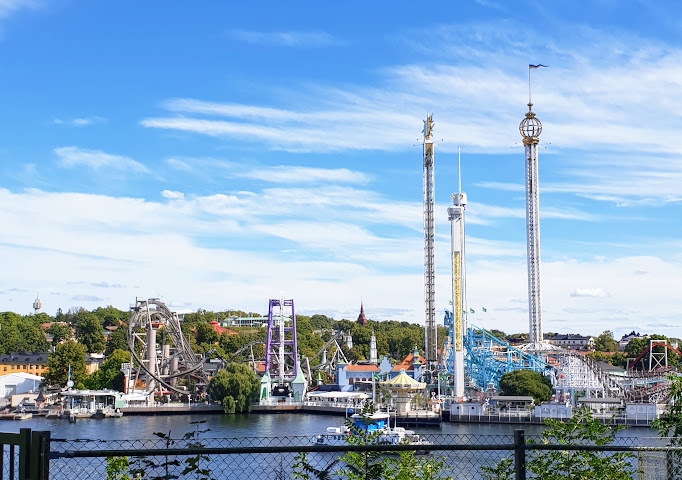
Teams visited Tivoli Gröna Lund, Sweden's oldest amusement park, where one team member had to ride the Fritt Fall drop tower in order to find their next clue.

- Episode 7: "This Is the Worst Thing I've Ever Done in My Life" (November 8, 2009)
- Prize: A trip for two to the Turks and Caicos Islands (awarded to Flight Time & Big Easy)

Locations

- Vierhuizen (De Onderneming Windmill (in Dutch))
- Amsterdam → Stockholm, Sweden
- & Stockholm → Djurgården
- Djurgården (Tivoli Gröna Lund – Fritt Fall & Ring Toss Booth)
- Håbo (Skokloster (in Swedish))
- Häggvik (Bögs Gård Farm)

Episode summary

- At the start of this leg, teams were instructed to fly to Stockholm, Sweden. Once there, teams had to travel by train and ferry to the Tivoli Gröna Lund amusement park on Djurgården, where they found their next clue. One team member had to ride the Fritt Fall drop tower and look for an arrow that pointed them in the direction of their next clue located among the carnival games. There, teams then had to play a game of ring toss until they ringed a large gnome hat with a Travelocity Roaming Gnome concealed beneath it. If successful, the game attendant handed them the gnome, which contained their next clue on its base. Teams had to keep the gnome with them for the remainder of the leg.
- This leg's Detour was a choice between Nobel Dynamite or Viking Alphabet. In Nobel Dynamite, teams drove to a rock quarry and had to fill sandbags in order to create a protective bunker before setting off an explosion with dynamite, which unearthed a metal box containing their next clue. In Viking Alphabet, teams would have decoded a message in Elder Futhark on a runestone, using smaller stones with both runes and letters, that told them to "Locate Trygve the Strong Viking" in order to receive their next clue. All teams chose Nobel Dynamite.
- After the Detour, teams had to drive to the Bögs Gård Farm in Häggvik, where they found their next clue.
- This leg's Roadblock was a Switchback from season 6, where one team member had to search through 186 hay bales to find one of seven Amazing Race flags. When racers found a flag, they could proceed with their partner to the nearby Pit Stop.

Additional note

- This was a non-elimination leg.

=== Leg 9 (Sweden → Estonia) ===
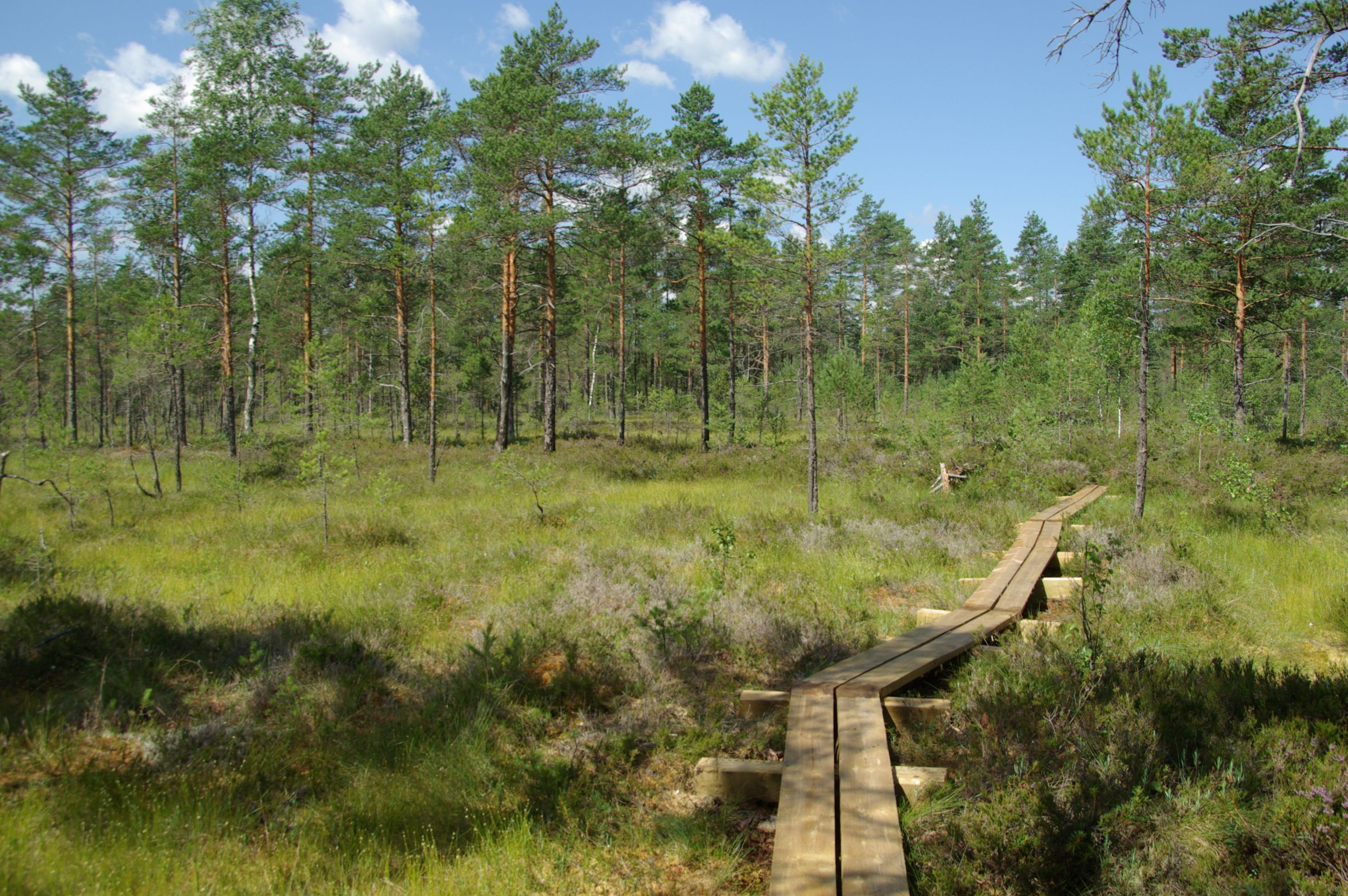
This leg's Detour paid tribute to Estonia's leisure time in their rich raised bogs.

- Episode 8: "We're Not Meant for the Swamp" (November 15, 2009)
- Prize: A red cedar sauna (awarded to Meghan & Cheyne)
- Eliminated: Gary & Matt

Locations

- Häggvik (Bögs Gård Farm)
- Stockholm → Tallinn, Estonia
- Tallinn (Mustpeade Maja)
- Tallinn (Saunabuss)
- Tallinn (Pikk Hermann Tower Gardens)
- Keava (Keava Raba (in Estonian))
- Keava (Keava Raba Overlook Tower)

Episode summary

- At the start of this leg, teams were given a set of keys along with their clue, which instructed them to travel by ferry across the Baltic Sea to Tallinn, Estonia. Once there, teams had to travel to the Mustpeade Maja, where they had to find the right key that sounded an alarm and opened the door in order to find their next clue inside.
- In this leg's Roadblock, one team member had to enter the cellar of the Mustpeade Maja and participate in a ceremony of the Brotherhood of Blackheads Guild. Team members had to pick up a candelabra with a room number attached to it from a table. When they found the room, they were given what appeared to be a blank scroll. Team members had to figure out that their next clue was written in invisible ink and could be revealed by holding the scroll over the light of the candle. The clue read Pikk Hermann Tower Gardens, which was their next destination.
- For their Speed Bump, Gary & Matt had to find a Saunabuss parked nearby. They then had to strip naked and spend five minutes in the sauna with some locals before they could continue racing.
- At the Pikk Hermann Tower Gardens, teams found their next clue, which directed them to the Keava Raba in Keava.
- This leg's Detour was a choice between Serve or Sling. In Serve, teams had to strip to their underwear and participate in a game of volleyball in the bog, where they had to score a total of five points against a local team in order to receive their next clue. In Sling, teams had to put on bog shoes and walk out onto a bog, where they used slingshots to fire vegetables at a target, which, when hit, collapsed a table full of cabbages along with their next clue.
- After the Detour, teams had to check in at the Pit Stop: the Keava Raba Overlook Tower.

=== Leg 10 (Estonia → Czech Republic) ===
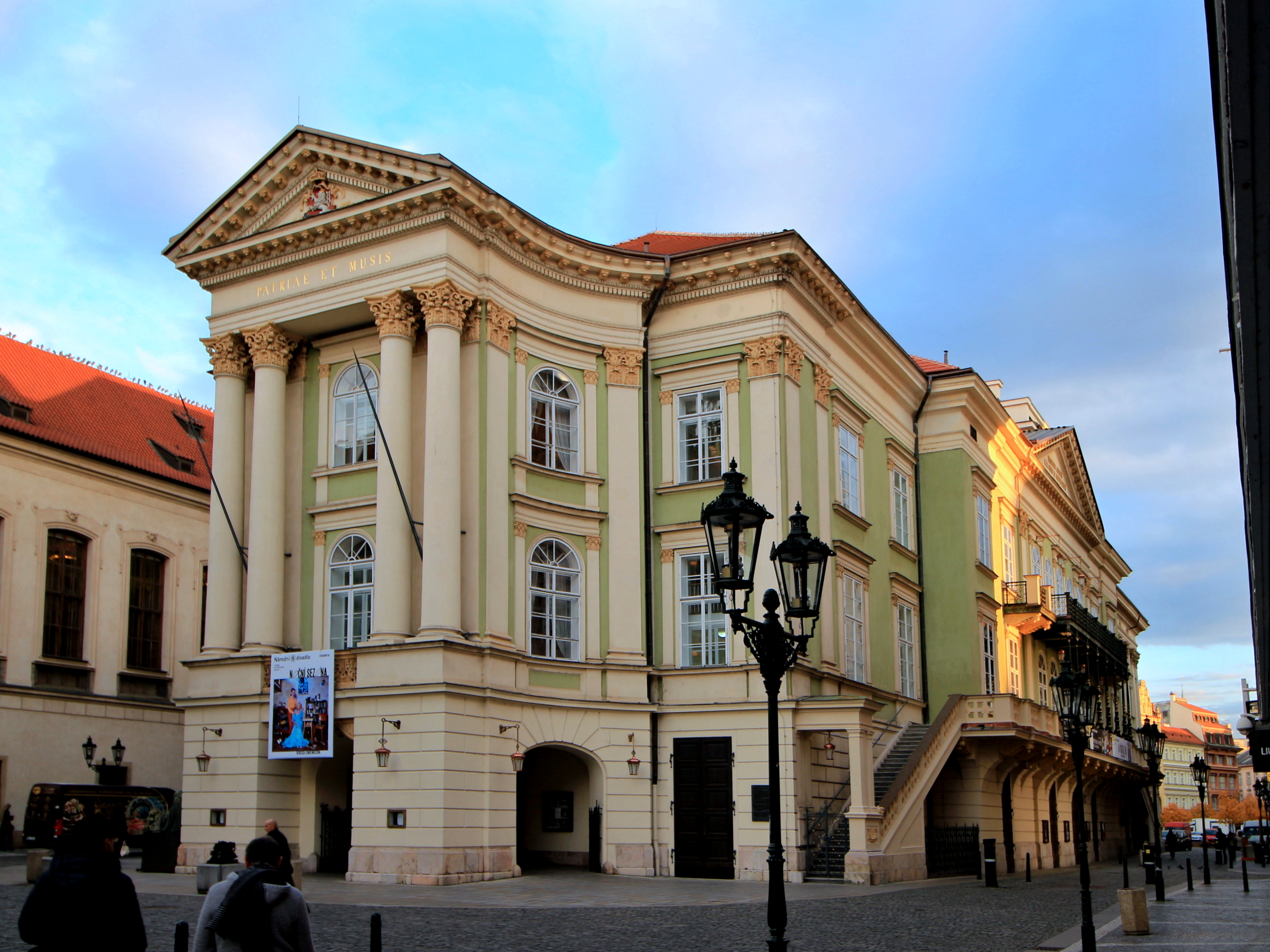
The Roadblock in Prague required one team member to search among the seats of the Estates Theatre to find a miniature mandolin.

- Episode 9: "We're Not Working With Anybody, Ever, Anymore!" (November 22, 2009)
- Prize: A trip for two to Lanai, Hawaii (awarded to Meghan & Cheyne)

Locations

- Keava (Keava Raba Overlook Tower)
- Tallinn → Prague, Czech Republic
- Prague (Old Town Square)
- Prague (Vltava – Kajaky Trója)
- Prague (Estates Theatre)
- Prague (Prague Castle)

Episode summary

- At the start of this leg, teams were instructed to fly to Prague, Czech Republic. Once there, teams had to head to the Old Town Square and find a man in a vintage Praga, who gave them their next clue. Teams then had to travel to Kajaky Trója in order to find their next clue.
- This leg's Detour was a choice between Fast & Furious or Slow & Steady. In Fast & Furious, teams had to row a kayak down a man-made whitewater rafting course used by professional kayakers and grab a ribbon suspended over the course which had their next clue written on it. If their boat capsized before reaching the clue, they had to start over. In Slow & Steady, both team members had to pull themselves along an aerial rope course suspended above the rafting course and grab one of two ribbons that, when combined, had their next clue written on them. Sam & Dan attempted Fast & Furious, but were unsuccessful after two attempts. All teams thus completed Slow & Steady. The text on the ribbon was written in Czech – Stavovské Divadlo – and teams to figure out that their next clue was at the Estates Theatre.
- In this leg's Roadblock, one team member had to search the Estates Theatre for a miniature mandolin and bring it on-stage to an actor dressed as the titular character from the Mozart opera Don Giovanni in order to receive their next clue directing them to the Pit Stop: Prague Castle.

Additional note

- This was a non-elimination leg.

=== Leg 11 (Czech Republic) ===
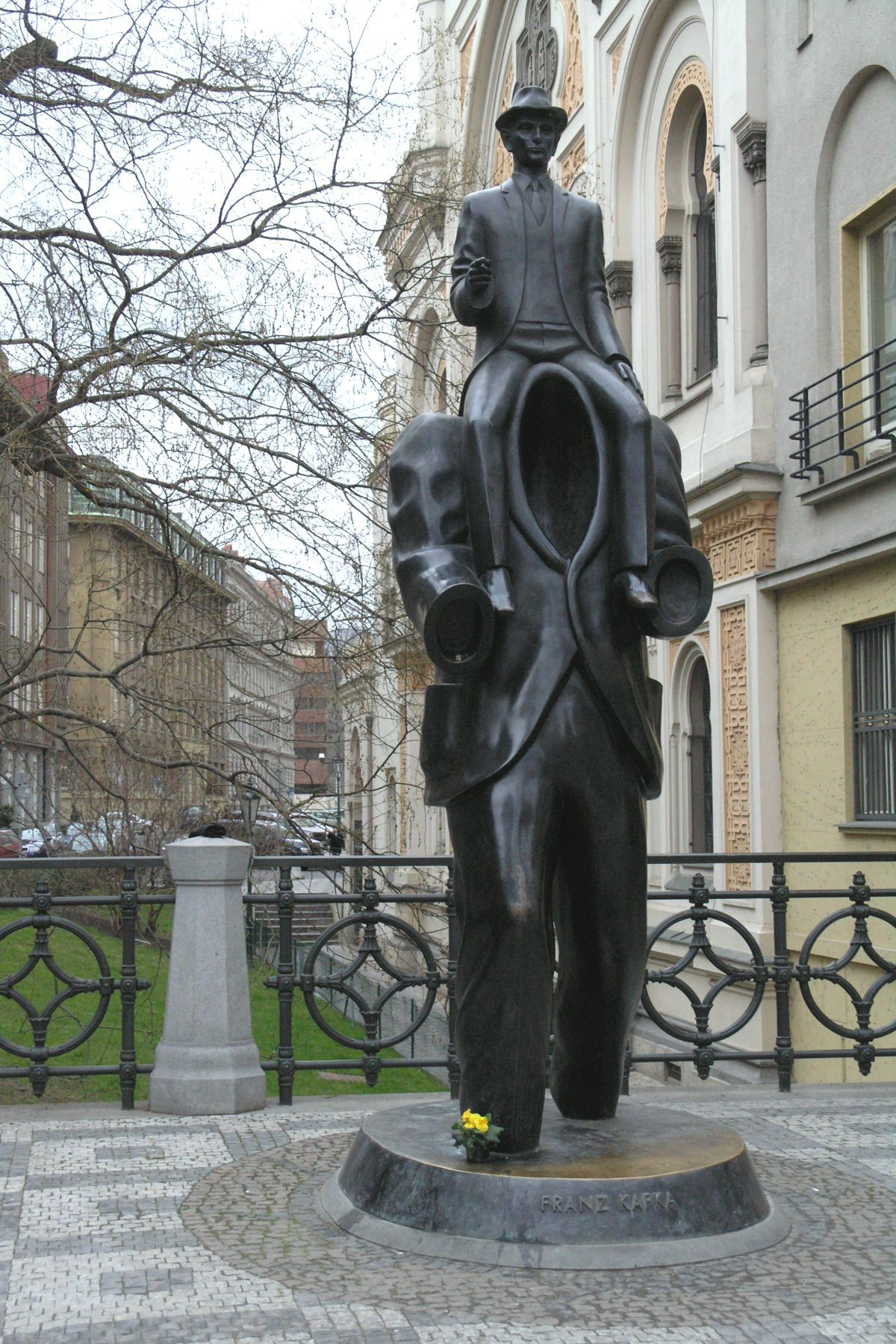
The second leg in Prague took place in the city's Jewish quarter Josefov: the home of author Franz Kafka.

- Episode 10: "It Starts With an 'F', That's All I'm Saying" (November 29, 2009)
- Prize: A pair of 52-inch HD LCD TVs (awarded to Meghan & Cheyne)
- Eliminated: Flight Time & Big Easy

Locations

- Prague (Prague Castle)
- Prague (Spanish Synagogue)
- Prague (M1 Lounge)
- Prague (Ekotechnické Museum)
- Prague (Kryocentrum)
- Prague (Charles Bridge)
- Prague (Franz Kafka Museum & Old New Synagogue or U Fleků & Restaurace Kozička)
- Prague (Střelecký Island)

Episode summary

- At the start of this leg, teams had to travel to the Spanish Synagogue and find their next clue, which directed them to the Ekotechnické Museum.
- For their Speed Bump, Brian & Ericka had to travel to the M1 Lounge, where each of them had to prepare and drink a traditional shot of absinthe before they could continue racing.
- In this leg's Roadblock, one team member had to enter a kafkaesque room and search among several hundred ringing telephones for the five that had a person on the other end of the line. A voice from each phone gave racers one letter of the word FRANZ: a reference to Franz Kafka. Without writing anything down, racers had to remember each letter before entering the supervisor's office, where they had to fill out a lengthy form and correctly unscramble the five letters to receive them their next clue. If they were wrong, racers had to fill out a new form and try again.
- After the Roadblock, teams had to travel to the Kryocentrum, where they had to strip down to their underwear and spend two minutes in a cryotherapy chamber, which reached temperatures of −160 °C (−256 °F), to receive their next clue. Teams were then directed to the Charles Bridge, where they found their next clue.
- This season's final Detour was a choice between Legend or Lager. In Legend, teams had to build a golem by placing wet clay around a hay frame and then transport it to the Old New Synagogue. If the golem met the satisfaction of the rabbis, teams received their next clue. In Lager, teams had to carry a total of thirty glasses of beer from the U Fleků brewery through the busy town square and deliver them to the Restaurace Kozička to receive their next clue.
- After the Detour, teams had to check in at the Pit Stop: Střelecký Island.

Additional notes

- Big Easy chose to quit the Roadblock and he & Flight Time were issued a four-hour penalty. By the time their penalty was over, all of the other teams had already checked in at the Pit Stop. After arriving at the Kryocentrum, Flight Time & Big Easy were instructed to go directly to the Pit Stop for elimination.
- The telephone task was later revisited in season 30 as a Switchback.

=== Leg 12 (Czech Republic → United States) ===
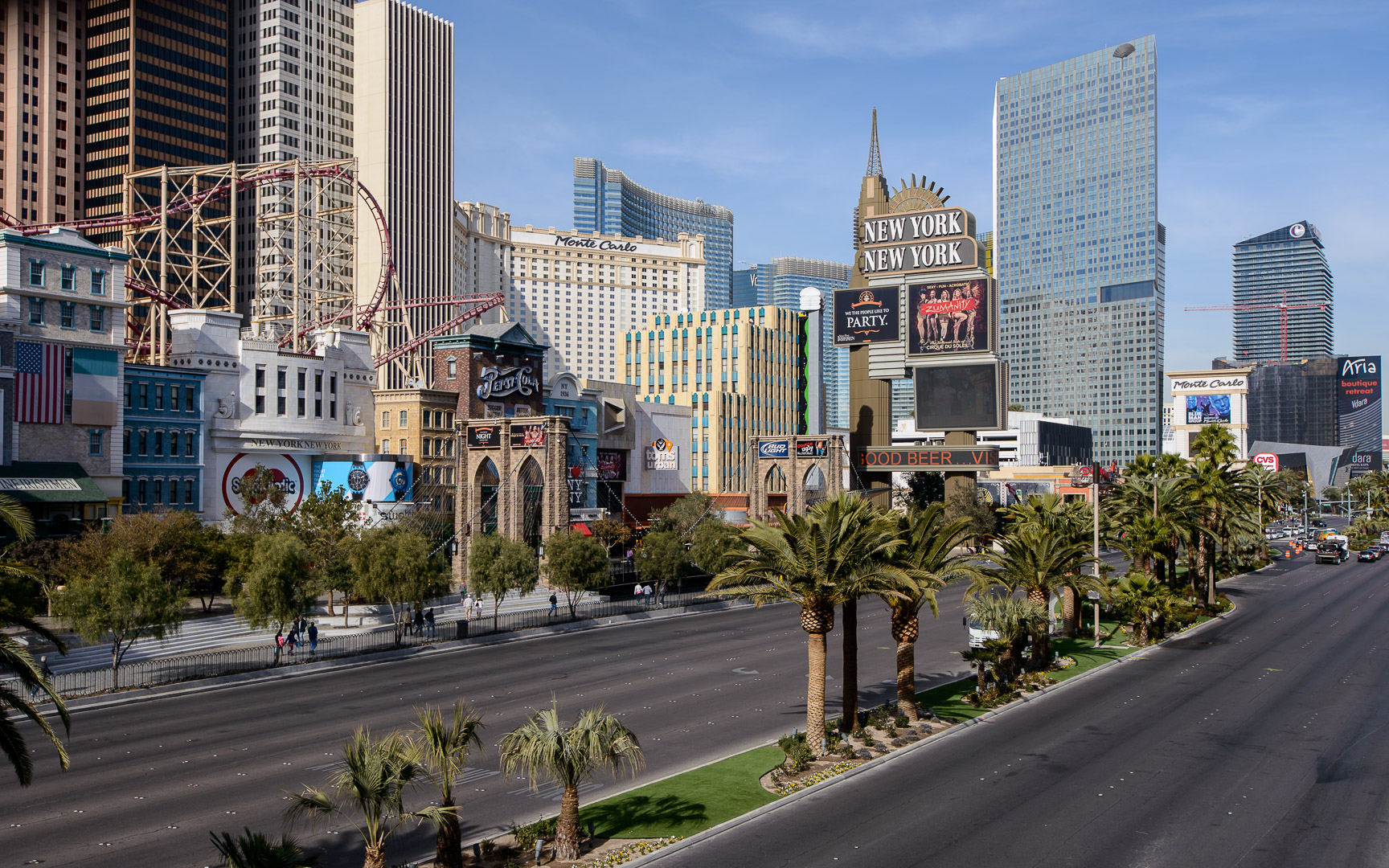
The season's final leg took place at various resorts on the Las Vegas Strip.

- Episode 11: "Amazing Grace, How Sweet the Sound" (December 6, 2009)
- Prize: US$1,000,000
- Winners: Meghan & Cheyne
- Runners-up: Sam & Dan
- Third place: Brian & Ericka

Locations

- Prague (Střelecký Island)
- Prague → Las Vegas, Nevada
- Las Vegas (Graceland Wedding Chapel)
- Las Vegas (Mandalay Bay)
- Las Vegas (The Mirage)
- Las Vegas (Monte Carlo Resort and Casino)
- Las Vegas (MGM Grand)
- Las Vegas (Casa de Shenandoah)

Episode summary

- At the start of this leg, teams were instructed to fly to Las Vegas, Nevada. Once there, teams traveled to the Graceland Wedding Chapel and received their next clue from an Elvis impersonator, which directed them to the Mandalay Bay.
- In this season's final Roadblock, one team member had to rappel face-first down the exterior of the Mandalay Bay hotel tower in order to receive their next clue.
- After the Roadblock, teams were directed to find the desert's mirage leading them to The Mirage, where they found their next clue at the Love theater. There, one team member was harnessed in a bungee cord and launched by their teammate in an attempt to retrieve a bouquet of flowers dangling in the air. Once racers caught the bouquet, they had to exchange it with a flower child for their next clue.
- Teams were instructed to go to "the most famous casino in Monaco" and had to figure out that this was a reference to the namesake of the Monte Carlo Resort and Casino. There, teams had to count out a total of $1,000,000 worth of poker chips out of 8,400 chips of various denominations scattered on a poker table. Once the croupier verified that their count was correct, teams received a $1,000,000 poker chip along with their final clue, which instructed them to travel to Suite 88 of the MGM Grand and find "Mr. Las Vegas" (Wayne Newton). Newton then told them the location of the finish line: his house at Casa de Shenandoah.

== Elimination Station ==
After elimination, five of the first six teams were sequestered at a villa in Phú Quốc, Vietnam to await the finale. The exception was Eric & Lisa, who chose to leave the show upon their elimination. CBS posted short videos on its website after each episode aired in the Pacific Time Zone to show the eliminated teams interacting at the villa.

- Leg 1 was a non-elimination leg, hence no team was sent to the villa and no episode was shown. Eric & Lisa were eliminated at the Starting Line and the first team to be eliminated, but they did not go to the Elimination Station.
- After Leg 2, Garrett & Jessica were the second team to be eliminated and were the first team sent to the villa. They both expressed their disappointment after having been in second place earlier in the leg and then being the first eliminated. Garrett believed that either Maria and Tiffany or Mika and Canaan would be the next team eliminated but both agreed that any of the teams could be eliminated next because of the animal challenges that faced them in the prior leg. Garrett noticed that Jessica was extremely bummed since being eliminated and he wanted to ask her to marry him at the Finish Line. Garrett proposed to Jessica at the beach and she said yes, after which her mood was significantly raised.
- After Leg 3, Marcy & Ron were the third team eliminated and were the second team sent to the villa. Ron told Garrett & Jessica that the intensity had gone up a notch between the remaining racers in the last leg. The eliminated teams did a Vietnamese Martial Arts Exercise, then went out to a luxurious restaurant called Việt Xưa. They had different views as to who would be the next team eliminated; Marcy believed that Flight Time & Big Easy would be eliminated next, Garrett, Jessica and Ron went with Meghan & Cheyne, Sam & Dan, and Mika & Canaan, respectively.
- After Leg 4, Zev & Justin were the fourth team eliminated but were not immediately sent to the villa due to Zev losing his passport. At the villa, Marcy and Ron asked Garrett and Jessica about the marriage proposal. Noting it had been two days since the next eliminated team was supposed to arrive, the two teams discussed what might have happened to the next eliminated team. Ron speculated that the team had either lost their passports or were seriously injured. Meanwhile, in Phnom Penh, Zev & Justin went to the U.S. Embassy to request a replacement passport for Zev, only to find it had been found in a temple near the Roadblock and was turned in. They grew even more disappointed when they figured out the passport likely fell out of the fanny pack when Justin opened it to retrieve a headlight while they were searching for the Roadblock in the wrong place. They later called the villa and informed the two teams there of their elimination because of the passport mishap and told them that they would join them as soon as they could.
- After Leg 5, Lance & Keri were the fifth team eliminated. The two teams at the villa were discussing Zev & Justin, speculating about their elimination. A van arrived at the villa and the teams went outside, fully expecting to see Zev & Justin. They were surprised to see that the van contained Lance & Keri; the third team to arrive at the villa. They explained to the other teams that their bad directional skills had led to their elimination, as well as the lodging conditions during the Cambodia Pit Stop. The three eliminated teams drove to a nearby river and started a race in a traditional Vietnamese boat between the boys (Garrett, Ron and Lance) and the girls (Jessica, Marcy and Keri).
- After Leg 6, Mika & Canaan were the sixth team to be eliminated. In the race teased in the previous episode, the eliminated girls managed to beat the boys in the boat race by nine seconds. Back at the villa, as the other three eliminated teams were relaxing, they noticed that Zev and Justin had shown up; the fourth team to arrive at the villa. The three eliminated teams were happy to see Zev & Justin who explained how they were eliminated and what they went through after this. The four eliminated teams went out to the night market where Zev sampled a chicken foot. Mika & Canaan were the fifth and last team to arrive at the villa. They explained to the other four eliminated teams of Mika's fear of water and heights that led to their elimination. Canaan noted they were at the water slide for around 45 minutes.
- After Leg 7, Maria & Tiffany were the seventh team to be eliminated. While the eliminated teams were playing cards, Maria & Tiffany called the villa to inform them of their elimination. They tried to explain to the other teams the true reason they were eliminated, but none of the other teams believed their story, as Maria & Tiffany had lied about their professions in the early stages of the season. Maria & Tiffany told the teams they would see them at the End City. Several teams expressed their resentment of Maria & Tiffany as well as their satisfaction that they were eliminated and would not be joining them at the villa. The teams at the villa traveled to a rough-looking soccer field where they believed they would be playing against 7- to 9-year-old children from the area, but instead played against a teenage-looking group of soccer players.
- Leg 8 was a non-elimination leg, hence no new teams were sent to the villa. In the soccer match teased in the previous episode, the Vietnamese soccer players easily defeated the eliminated boys 4-0. The eliminated teams at the villa had a shaman visit the villa and the teams had their futures told to them. Canaan decided to break up with Mika, saying the reason was not because of the Race, but because he was not ready for a relationship and hoped they would remain friends. In a post-show interview, however, they mentioned that they made up.
- After Leg 9, Gary & Matt were the eighth team eliminated. Prior to the call, the eliminated teams at the villa made predictions as to who would be eliminated next. All teams believed it was Brian and Ericka, except for Zev & Justin who believed it would be Gary & Matt who would be eliminated next. Gary & Matt then called the teams at the villa to inform them of their elimination. They told them about their Speed Bump that helped lead to their elimination, saying they were just minutes behind the last team. When asked who would win, they believed any one of the teams could win.
- Leg 10 was a non-elimination leg, hence no new teams were sent to the villa. A taekwondo instructor was brought in to teach the eliminated teams how to spar. Lance, who was a blackbelt, took on the taekwondo master's student – ultimately cheating by wrestling him to the floor. They all then tried breaking tiles with their hands. All the eliminated teams had to pack up and fly to the End City. Jessica believed it was in Portland, Oregon, or maybe in Los Angeles, while Lance wished for it to be on the East Coast so he could easily return to Boston afterward.
- After Leg 11, Flight Time & Big Easy were the ninth and final team eliminated. Elimination Station showed five of the six eliminated teams arriving at the End City in Las Vegas, Nevada. After arriving there, the teams checked into a hotel. Once they checked in, they discussed with each other who would be eliminated next prior to a phone call from the ninth team. The teams at the hotel were shocked and disappointed to hear about Flight Time & Big Easy's elimination especially Zev & Justin who wanted them to win. They told them about what went wrong at the Roadblock. Flight Time & Big Easy said that they wanted to see Meghan & Cheyne to win it all and told them that they would see them at the Finish Line. Lance & Keri were happy to see the end of the season and to know who they think is going to win. Garrett said that it's anybody's race. All the eliminated teams wanted to see Meghan and Cheyne to win, except for Garrett & Jessica who wanted to see Sam & Dan to come in 1st, Brian & Ericka in 2nd, and Meghan & Cheyne in 3rd.
- Leg 12 was the final leg of The Amazing Race 15. Maria & Tiffany, Gary & Matt, and Flight Time & Big Easy reunited with the other eliminated teams (except Eric & Lisa) at the Finish Line at Casa de Shenandoah. Most of the teams believed that they wanted to see Meghan & Cheyne win. Teams expressed their opinions about the final three teams at the Finish Line along with their joys and disappointments.

== Reception ==
=== Critical response ===
The Amazing Race 15 received mixed reviews. Jessica Shaw of Entertainment Weekly wrote "It wasn't the best race, but it wasn't the worst. I'm neither happy about the outcome nor angry. I guess all in all, it was pretty neat." Michael Hewitt of the Orange County Register wrote that the episodes during the mid-season were underwhelming but they picked up by the end of the season. Daron Aldridge of Box Office Prophets wrote "the season delivered in a big way and I will happily declare this my favorite season of The Amazing Race, a series that I haven't missed a single episode of in its 15 seasons." In 2016, this season was ranked 18th out of the first 27 seasons by the Rob Has a Podcast Amazing Race correspondents. In 2021, Val Barone of TheThings ranked this season as the show's 7th best season. In 2024, Rhenn Taguiam of Game Rant ranked this season 19th out of 36.

== Ratings ==
=== U.S. Nielsen ratings ===
| # | Airdate | Episode | Rating | Share | Rating/Share (18-49) | Viewers (millions) | Rank (Overall) |
|---|---|---|---|---|---|---|---|
| 1 – 2 | September 27, 2009 | "They Thought Godzilla Was Walking Down the Street" | 6.5 | 10 | 3.3/8 | 10.40 | #25 |
| 3 | October 4, 2009 | "It's Like Being Dropped on Planet Mars" | 5.9 | 9 | 2.8/7 | 9.95 | #26 |
| 4 | October 11, 2009 | "Sean Penn Cambodia Here We Come" | 6.7 | 10 | 3.0/8 | 10.52 | #20 |
| 5 | October 18, 2009 | "I'm Like Ricky Bobby" | 5.8 | 9 | 3.0/7 | 10.92 | #20 |
| 6 | October 25, 2009 | "Do It for the Hood! Do It for the Suburbs!" | 6.4 | 10 | 3.4/8 | 11.20 | #22 |
| 7 | November 1, 2009 | "This Is Not My Finest Hour" | 6.5 | 10 | 3.3/8 | 11.22 | #18 |
| 8 | November 8, 2009 | "This Is the Worst Thing I've Ever Done in My Life" | 6.9 | 10 | 3.5/9 | 11.62 | #24 |
| 9 | November 15, 2009 | "We're Not Meant for the Swamp" | 6.6 | 10 | 3.2/8 | 11.39 | #24 |
| 10 | November 22, 2009 | "We're Not Working With Anybody, Ever, Anymore!" | 6.9 | 11 | 3.7/9 | 12.19 | #20 |
| 11 | November 29, 2009 | "It Starts With an "F", That's All I'm Saying" | 6.8 | 10 | 3.4/8 | 11.61 | #18 |
| 12 | December 6, 2009 | "Amazing Grace, How Sweet the Sound" | 7.1 | 11 | 3.7/9 | 12.32 | #9 |

=== Canadian ratings ===
| # | Airdate | Episode | Viewers (millions) | Rank (Overall) |
|---|---|---|---|---|
| 1 – 2 | September 27, 2009 | "They Thought Godzilla Was Walking Down the Street" | 2.86 | #6 |
| 3 | October 4, 2009 | "It's Like Being Dropped on Planet Mars" | 2.67 | #5 |
| 4 | October 11, 2009 | "Sean Penn Cambodia Here We Come" | 2.00 | #13 |
| 5 | October 18, 2009 | "I'm Like Ricky Bobby" | 2.41 | #9 |
| 6 | October 25, 2009 | "Do It for the Hood! Do It for the Suburbs!" | 2.62 | #5 |
| 7 | November 1, 2009 | "This Is Not My Finest Hour" | 2.58 | #3 |
| 8 | November 8, 2009 | "This Is the Worst Thing I've Ever Done in My Life" | 2.76 | #3 |
| 9 | November 15, 2009 | "We're Not Meant for the Swamp" | 2.62 | #8 |
| 10 | November 22, 2009 | "We're Not Working With Anybody, Ever, Anymore!" | 2.26 | #9 |
| 11 | November 29, 2009 | "It Starts With an "F", That's All I'm Saying" | 2.42 | #7 |
| 12 | December 6, 2009 | "Amazing Grace, How Sweet the Sound" | 3.07 | #1 |

=== Awards ===
In 2010, The Amazing Race 15 was nominated for a GLAAD Media Award for Outstanding Reality Program during the 21st GLAAD Media Awards.
