= Herbert Lang (disambiguation) =

Herbert Lang (1879–1957) was a German zoologist.

Herbert Lang may also refer to:

- Herbert "Flight Time" Lang (born 1976), basketball player for the Harlem Globetrotters

== See also ==
- Herbert Lange, (1909–1945), German Nazi commander
