= Střelecký Island =

Island on the Vltava river in Prague, Czech Republic

Native name: Střelecký ostrov
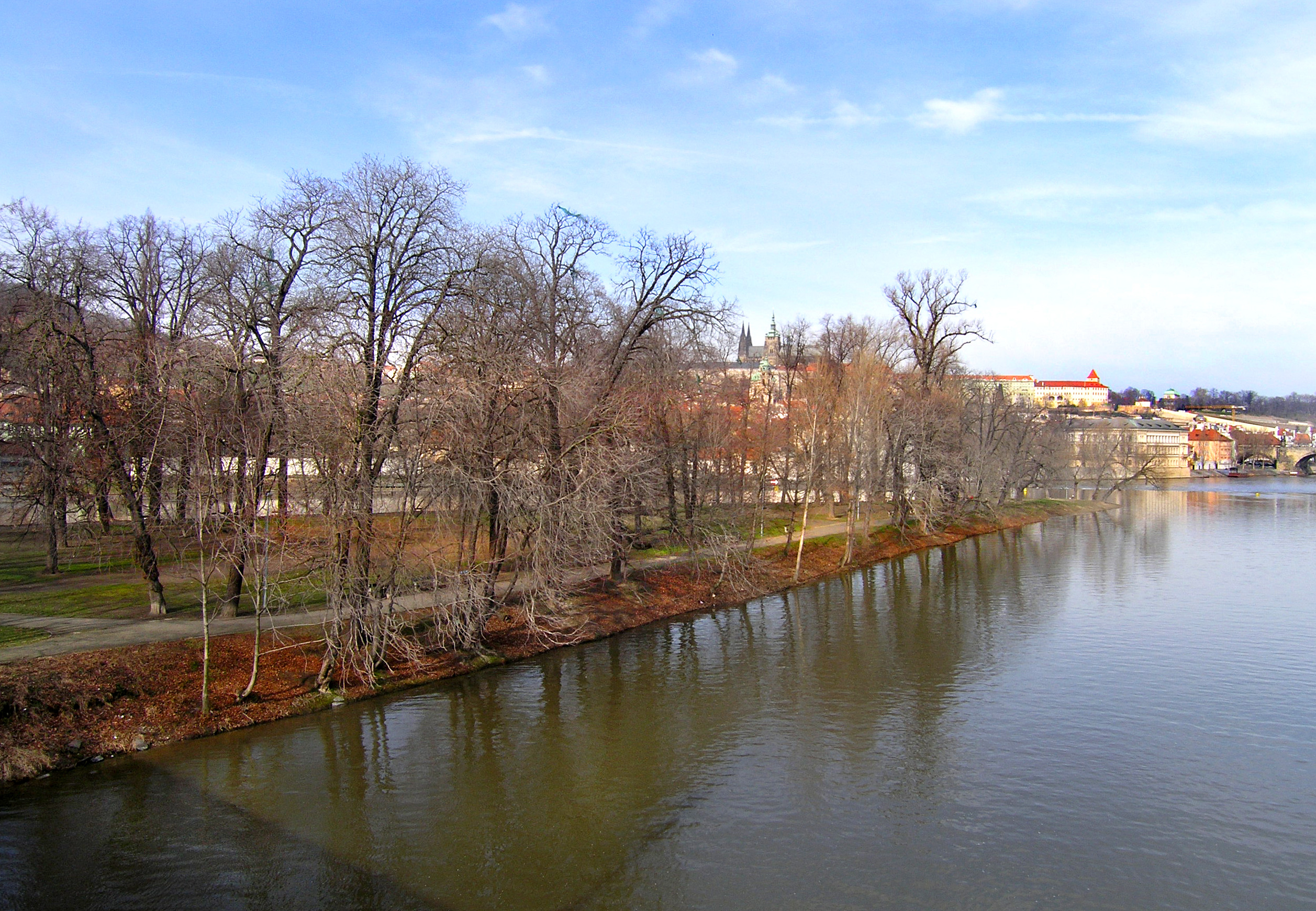
- The island as seen from Legion Bridge
- Interactive map of Střelecký Island

Geography
- Location: Vltava
- Coordinates: 50.0811°N 14.4101°E

Administration
- Czech Republic

Střelecký Island (Czech: Střelecký ostrov — meaning Archer's Island) is an island in the Vltava in Prague, Czech Republic. It is accessible from Legion Bridge.

== History ==
The island was only accessible by ferry until 1841, when the Most císaře Františka I. bridge was connected. The first slet of the Sokol movement was held here in 1882. In 1901 Legion Bridge replaced Most císaře Františka I as the island's connection to the rest of the city.

== Gallery ==
The island from the Old Town Bridge Tower, before 1892

View from the roof of the National Theatre across the island, before 1905
