= Nathaniel "Big Easy" Lofton =

American basketball player (born 1981)

Nathaniel Lofton
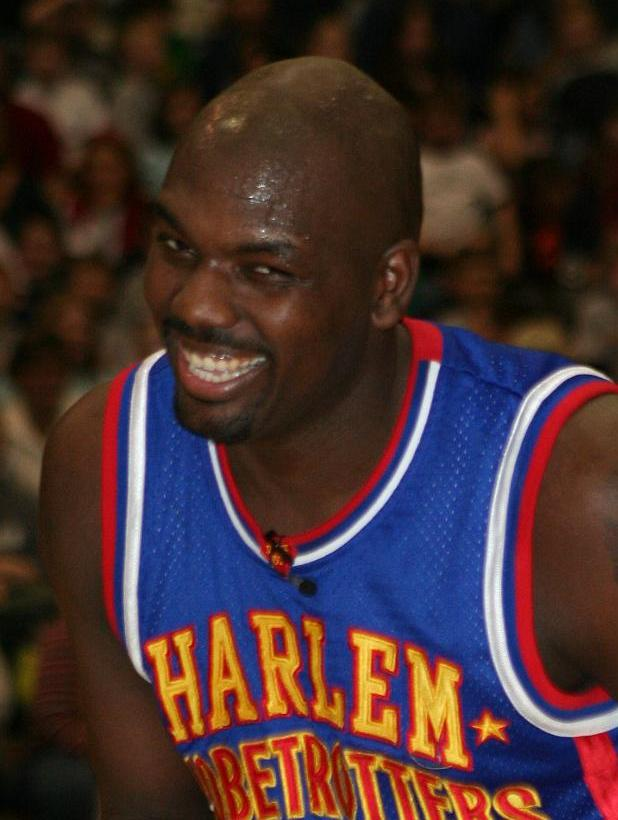
- Born: April 15, 1981 (age 45); New Orleans, Louisiana, U.S.
- Occupation: Basketball player
- Television: The Amazing Race 15 (4th place); The Amazing Race 18 (2nd place); The Amazing Race 24 (6th place)
- Sports career
- Height: 6 ft 9 in (206 cm)
- Weight: 250 lb (110 kg; 17 st 12 lb)
- Sport: Basketball
- Team: Harlem Globetrotters

Nathaniel "Big Easy" Lofton (born April 15, 1981) is an American basketball player for the Harlem Globetrotters. He and his fellow Globetrotter Herbert "Flight Time" Lang are known for their participation in three seasons of The Amazing Race.

Nate played collegiate basketball for the Southeastern Louisiana University Lions.

== The Amazing Race performance ==
With Herbert "Flight Time" Lang, Big Easy has participated in three seasons of The Amazing Race.

=== The Amazing Race 15 ===
In their first season, The Amazing Race 15, Flight Time and Big Easy made it to the penultimate leg on a visit to Prague when Big Easy forfeited the Roadblock challenge, finding it too difficult. This ended their season in Leg 11 with a 4th-place finish.

=== Finishes ===
- 5th (leg 1)
- 3rd (leg 2)
- 1st (leg 3)
- 2nd (leg 4)
- 3rd (leg 5)
- 6th (leg 6)
- 3rd (leg 7)
- 1st (leg 8)
- 3rd (leg 9)
- 3rd (leg 10)
- 4th (leg 11/Eliminated)

=== The Amazing Race 18: Unfinished Business ===
They returned for The Amazing Race 18, subtitled "Unfinished Business", with their previous elimination cited as their "unfinished business". This time around, the Globetrotters, as they were often referred to in the program, made it to the final leg of the competition. They ultimately finished in 2nd place and lost the one million dollar grand prize and The Amazing Race: Unfinished Business title to Kisha & Jen.

=== Finishes ===
- 5th (leg 1)
- 2nd (leg 2)
- 5th (leg 3)
- 6th (leg 4)
- 6th (leg 5)
- 7th (leg 6)
- 1st (leg 7)
- 2nd (leg 8)
- 5th (leg 9)
- 1st (leg 10)
- 3rd (leg 11)
- 2nd (Final Leg)

=== The Amazing Race 24: All-Stars ===
The two made their return to the program in the 24th season, an "All-Stars" season, and they had five 6th-place finishes in a row including Leg 8 which their season had come to an end with a 6th-place finish.

=== Finishes ===
- 7th (leg 1)
- 5th (leg 2)
- 5th (leg 3)
- 6th (leg 4)
- 6th (leg 5)
- 6th (leg 6)
- 6th (leg 7)
- 6th (leg 8/Eliminated)
