= Herbert "Flight Time" Lang =

American basketball player (born 1976)

Herbert Lang
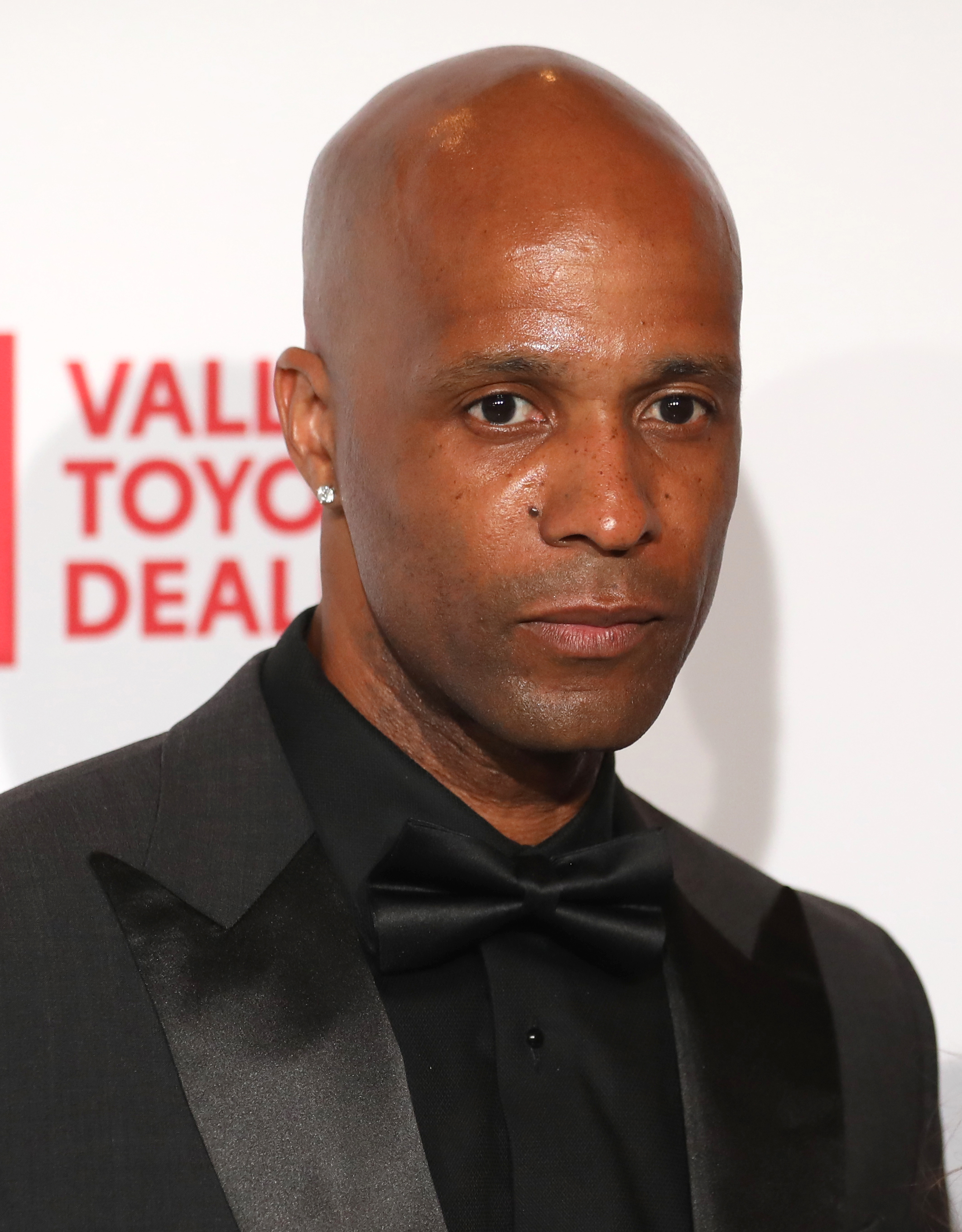
- Lang in 2024
- Born: August 1, 1976 (age 50); Brinkley, Arkansas, U.S.
- Education: Centenary College of Louisiana
- Occupation: Basketball player
- Television: The Amazing Race 15 (4th place); The Amazing Race 18 (2nd place); The Amazing Race 24 (6th place)
- Sports career
- Height: 6 ft 3 in (191 cm)
- Weight: 195 lb (88 kg; 13 st 13 lb)
- Sport: Basketball
- Team: Harlem Globetrotters

Herbert "Flight Time" Lang (born August 1, 1976) is an American basketball player for the Harlem Globetrotters.

== Career ==
He graduated from Centenary College of Louisiana in 1998, after a season in which he led the Trans-America Athletic Conference in scoring and won the National Association of Basketball Coaches Slam Dunk Contest. The Globetrotters invited him to their training camp in 1999 He appeared on Are You Smarter than a 5th Grader? along with his fellow Globetrotters on a special celebrity week. Lang raised $25,000, the most out of all his fellow players. In total, the Globetrotters raised over $45,000 for the Make-A-Wish Foundation that week.

== The Amazing Race performance ==
With Nathaniel "Big Easy" Lofton, Flight Time has participated in three seasons of The Amazing Race.

=== The Amazing Race 15 ===
In their first season, The Amazing Race 15, Flight Time and Big Easy made it to the penultimate leg on a visit to Prague when Big Easy forfeited the Roadblock challenge, finding it too difficult. This ended their season in Leg 11 with a 4th-place finish.

==== Finishes ====
- 5th (leg 1)
- 3rd (leg 2)
- 1st (leg 3)
- 2nd (leg 4)
- 3rd (leg 5)
- 6th (leg 6)
- 3rd (leg 7)
- 1st (leg 8)
- 3rd (leg 9)
- 3rd (leg 10)
- 4th (leg 11/Eliminated)

=== The Amazing Race 18: Unfinished Business ===
They returned for The Amazing Race 18, subtitled "Unfinished Business", with their previous elimination cited as their "unfinished business." This time around, the Globetrotters, as they were often referred to in the program, made it to the final leg of the competition. They ultimately finished in 2nd place and lost the one million dollar grand prize and The Amazing Race: Unfinished Business title to Kisha & Jen.

==== Finishes ====
- 5th (leg 1)
- 2nd (leg 2)
- 5th (leg 3)
- 6th (leg 4)
- 6th (leg 5)
- 7th (leg 6)
- 1st (leg 7)
- 2nd (leg 8)
- 5th (leg 9)
- 1st (leg 10)
- 3rd (leg 11)
- 2nd (leg 12)

=== The Amazing Race 24: All-Stars ===
The two made their return to the program in the 24th season, an "All-Stars" season, and they had five 6th-place finishes in a row including Leg 8 which their season had come to an end with a 6th-place finish.

==== Finishes ====
- 7th (leg 1)
- 5th (leg 2)
- 5th (leg 3)
- 6th (leg 4)
- 6th (leg 5)
- 6th (leg 6)
- 6th (leg 7)
- 6th (leg 8/Eliminated)
