= Farmersgolf =

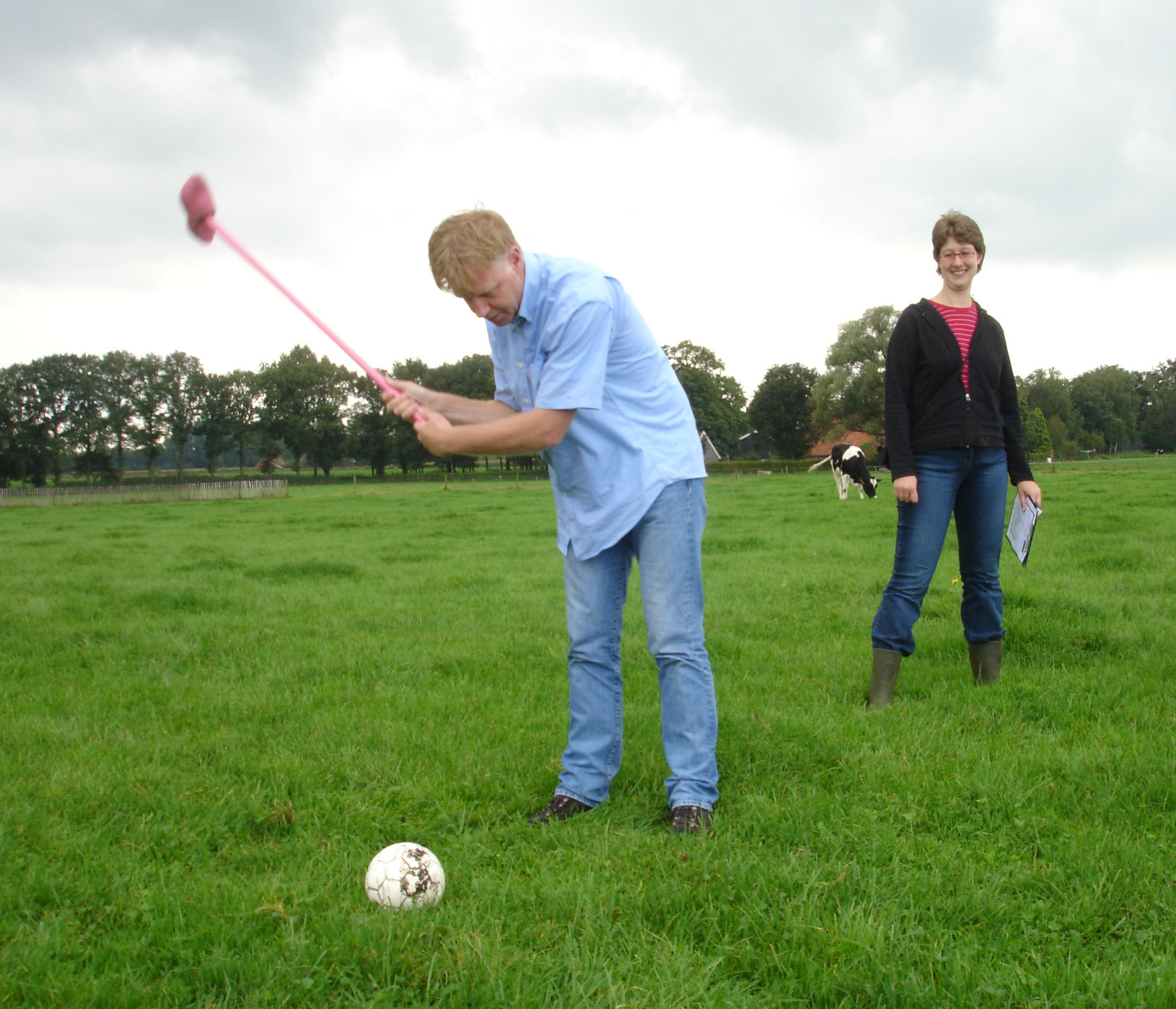
Preparing for a swing in Farmersgolf.

Farmersgolf (Boerengolf in Dutch) is a farm land game modelled after the sport of golf. It originated from a cheese farm run by Peter Weenink in Lievelde, a small village in the Achterhoek region of the Netherlands.

It was invented out of frustration with costly golf course fees in the Netherlands, and with a test called the GVB (Golfvaardigheidsbewijs) which most Dutch courses require players to pass before being allowed to play.

The first game was played in 1999, and since then games have also been played in Germany, Belgium, Sweden, France and Finland. There are currently about 70 farmers golf locations in the Netherlands, and over 110 Europe-wide. In 2005, over 10,000 people played the game on Weenink's course alone.

Farmersgolf is played with a special wooden golf club, with a club head in the shape of a wooden shoe, or clog (in Dutch: klomp). A farmers golf ball is, with its 20 centimeter diameter, much larger than a traditional golf ball.

A golf hole is made by placing a bucket in the ground and a flagpole beside it. The 8 to 10 holes have, on average, more than 200 meters distance between them.

The defining feature of Farmersgolf is that the game is played on an otherwise unaltered farm. Obstacles and "hazards" include anything one might find on the farm, including live cows, ditches and barbed wire.

The Farmersgolf name is trademarked in several countries and Weenink hopes to establish an international association that will raise the game to the level of serious sport.
