= Legion Bridge =

Legion Bridge Most Legií
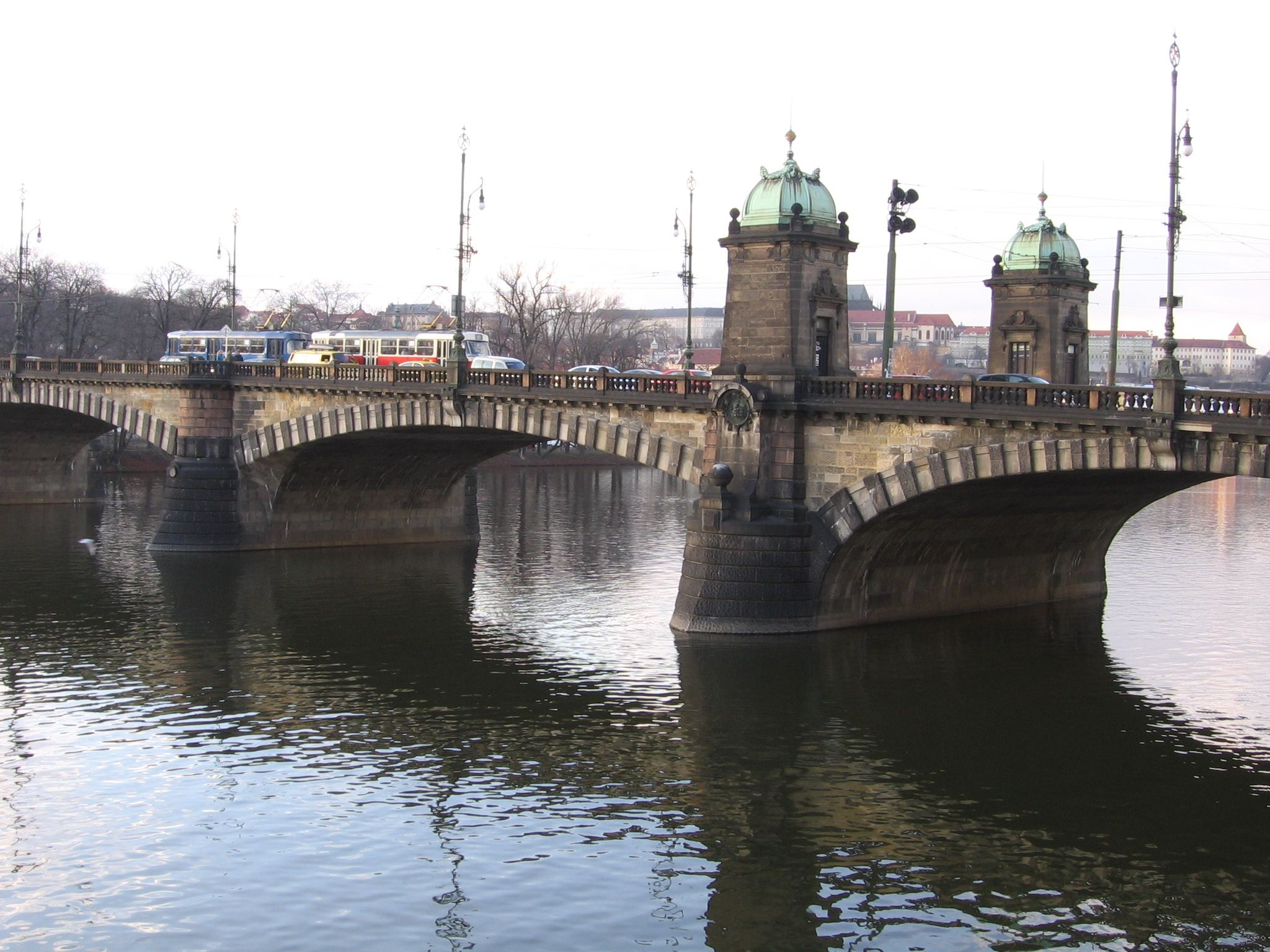
- The bridge in 2007
- Coordinates: 50°04′53″N 14°24′36″E
- Crosses: Vltava
- Locale: Prague, Czech Republic
- Named for: Czechoslovak Legion

Characteristics
- Material: Stone (granite, syenite, sandstone, quarry stone)
- Total length: 343,45 m
- Width: 16.4 m (54 ft)

History
- Architect: Antonín Balšánek, Jiří Soukup, Josef Janů
- Constructed by: Gregersen, Budapest
- Construction start: 1898
- Construction end: 1901
- Opened: 14 June 1901
- Replaces: Most císaře Františka I.

Location
- Interactive map of Legion Bridge

Legion Bridge (Czech: Most Legií) is a historic bridge over the Vltava in Prague, Czech Republic, named after the Czechoslovak Legion. It opened on 14 June 1901.

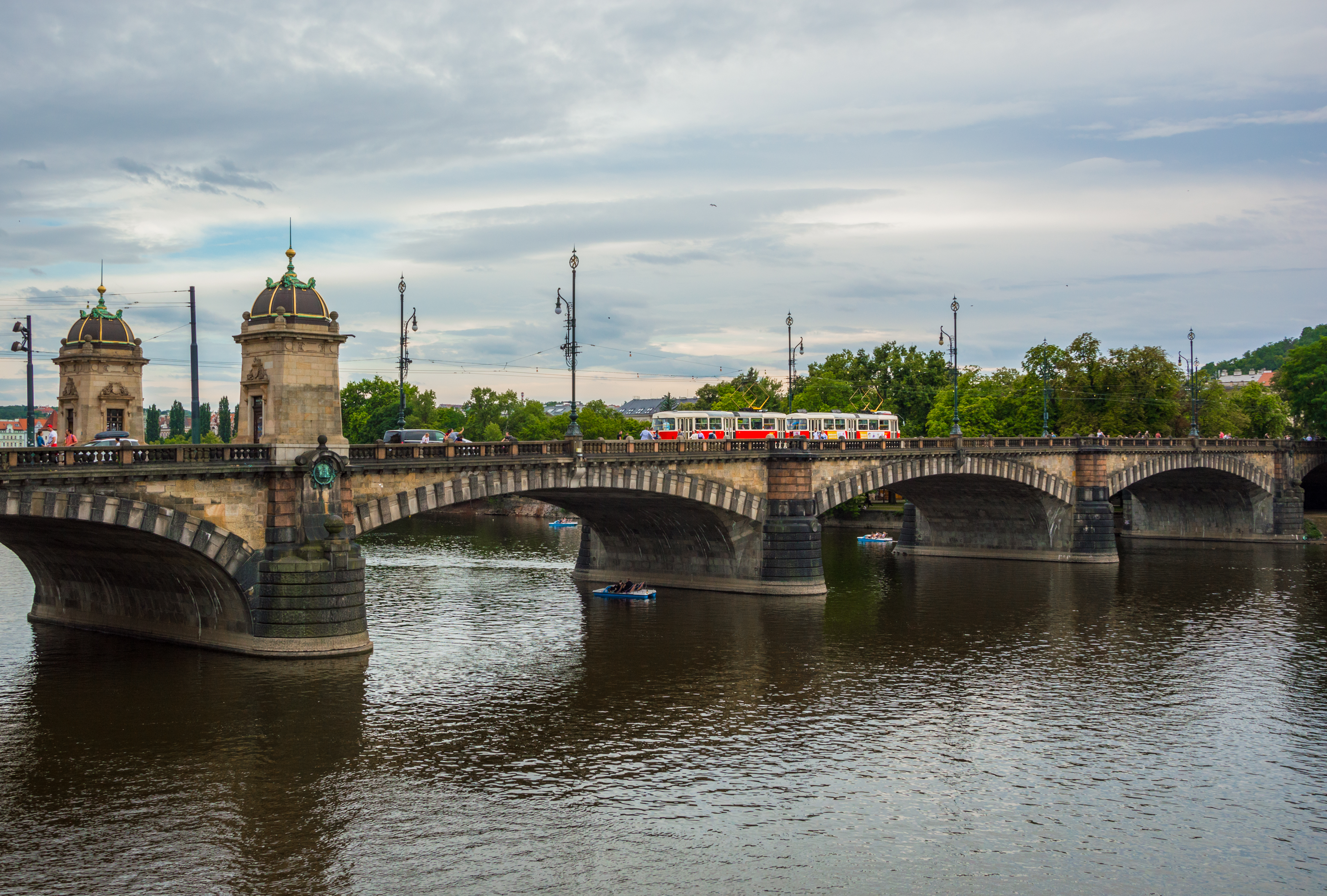
