= Dubai Desert Conservation Reserve =

Protected area n the emirate of Dubai

- Location within United Arab Emirates
- Location: Dubai, United Arab Emirates
- Coordinates: 24.827°N 55.641°E
- Area: 225 km^{2} (87 sq mi)
- Established: 2003
- Website: www.ddcr.org/en/

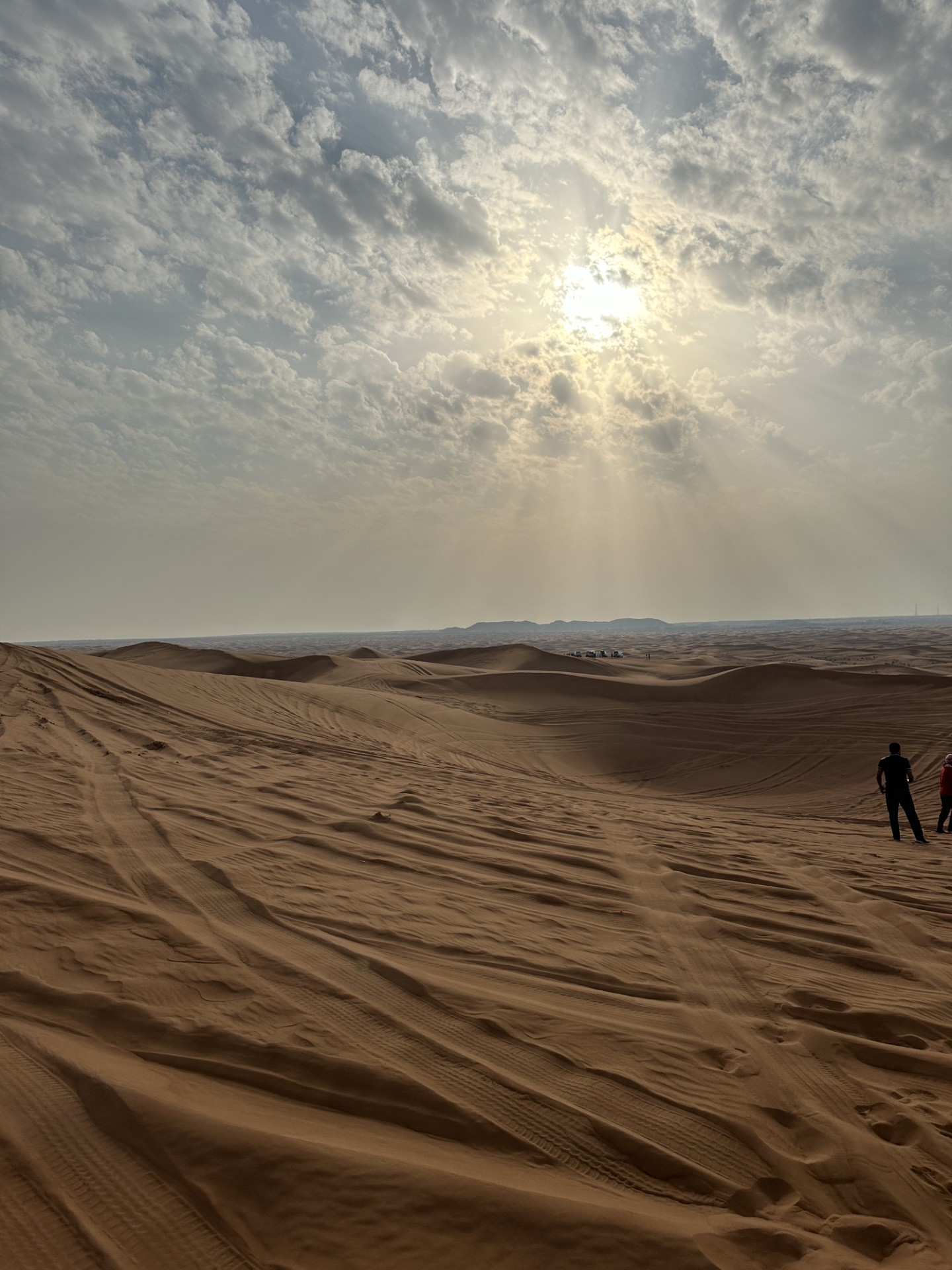
Sand dunes in the Dubai Desert Conservation Reserve.

The Dubai Desert Conservation Reserve, DDCR, is a 225-square-kilometre (87 sq mi) natural reserve in the emirate of Dubai in the United Arab Emirates. It was established by Emiri decree on 9 January 2002 and comprises some 5% of the Emirate of Dubai's total landmass.

It is home to the Al Maha Desert Resort and Spa. Now it has been became one of the most popular activity all across the world and been visited every season and been practiced in Red Sand Dunes of Dubai by thousands of visitors came from all across the world.

The DDCR is home to a variety of flora and fauna, including the Arabian Oryx, which has been successfully reintroduced into the wild through dedicated conservation programs. Today, the reserve supports the largest free-roaming herd of Arabian Oryx in the UAE, along with other species such as Arabian gazelles, sand gazelles, and various birds, reptiles, and insects.
