= The Amazing Race 18 =

Season of television series

- Season 18
- Region 1 DVD cover
- Presented by: Phil Keoghan
- No. of teams: 11
- Winners: Kisha and Jen Hoffman
- No. of legs: 12
- Distance traveled: 40,000 mi (64,000 km)
- No. of episodes: 11

Release
- Original network: CBS
- Original release: February 20 – May 8, 2011

Additional information
- Filming dates: November 20 – December 12, 2010

Series chronology
- ← Previous; Season 17 Next → Season 19

The Amazing Race 18 (also known as The Amazing Race: Unfinished Business) is the eighteenth season of the American reality competition show The Amazing Race. Hosted by Phil Keoghan, it featured eleven teams of two, each returning from a previous edition of the series, competing in a race around the world for US$1,000,000. This season visited five continents and nine countries, traveling approximately 40,000 miles (64,000 km) over twelve legs. Starting in Palm Springs, California, racers traveled through Australia, Japan, China, India, Austria, Liechtenstein, Switzerland, and Brazil, before returning to the United States and finishing in the Florida Keys. New elements introduced this season included the no-rest leg, where teams immediately began the next leg immediately after finishing the previous one, and an automatic U-Turn penalty for the last team to finish a particular task. This season was also the first to be filmed and broadcast for high-definition television. The season premiered on CBS on February 20, 2011, and concluded on May 8, 2011.

Sisters Kisha and Jen Hoffman from The Amazing Race 14 were the winners of this season, while Herbert "Flight Time" Lang and Nathaniel "Big Easy" Lofton of the Harlem Globetrotters from The Amazing Race 15 finished in second place, and father and daughter Gary and Mallory Ervin from The Amazing Race 17 finished in third place.

== Format ==
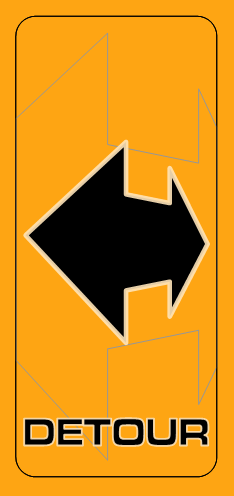
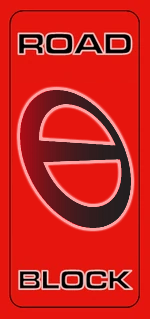
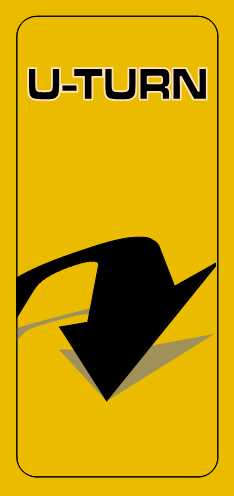
The clues which contestants receive during the course of the race generally fall into four categories: Route Info, Detour, Roadblock, and U-Turn.

The Amazing Race is a reality television show created by Bertram van Munster and Elise Doganieri, and hosted by Phil Keoghan. The series follows teams of two competing in a race around the world. Each leg of the race requires teams to deduce clues, navigate foreign environments, interact with locals, perform physical and mental challenges, and travel on a limited budget provided by the show. At each stop during the leg, teams receive clues inside sealed envelopes, which fall into one of these categories:

- Route Info: These are simple instructions that teams must follow before they can receive their next clue.
- Detour: A Detour is a choice between two tasks. Teams may choose either task and switch tasks if they find one option too difficult. There is usually one Detour present on each leg.
- Roadblock: A Roadblock is a task that only one team member can complete. Teams must choose which member will complete the task based on a brief clue they receive before fully learning the details of the task. There is usually one Roadblock present on each leg.
- U-Turn: The U-Turn allows one team to force another team to complete both options of the Detour before they can continue the race. Teams may use the U-Turn only one time during the entire race.
- Speed Bump: A penalty for teams who finished in last place on a non-elimination leg. It required the team to complete an additional task in the following leg that only they had to complete.

Most teams who arrive last at the Pit Stop of each leg are progressively eliminated, while the first team to arrive at the finish line in the final episode wins the grand prize of US$1,000,000.

== Production ==
=== Development and filming ===
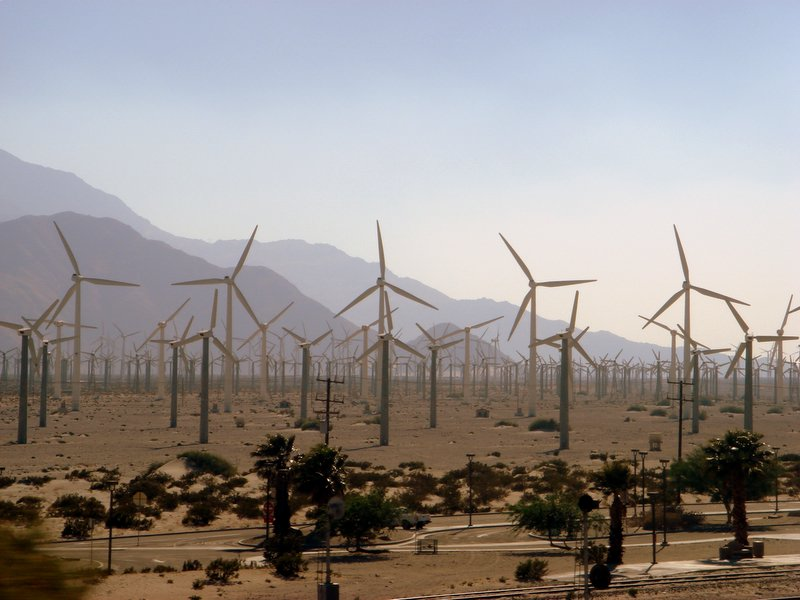
The starting line was at the San Gorgonio Pass wind farm near Palm Springs, California.

The Amazing Race 18 was the first season to be broadcast on high-definition television. While most other prime-time television shows had already transitioned to high definition, including other reality television shows, previous seasons of The Amazing Race used standard-definition television due to the cost and fragility of high-definition recording equipment.

Filming started on November 20, 2010, at the San Gorgonio Pass wind farm near Palm Springs, California. Teams were spotted at Oceanworld Manly on November 22, 2010, and a day later around the mining town of Broken Hill in the Australian Outback. Other locales cited as destinations were Yokohama, Japan, where teams swam in freezing waters near Mount Fuji, and the series' first visit to Liechtenstein.

At the end of the first leg in Sydney, Australia, and the fourth leg in Lijiang, China, teams were ordered to keep racing and given their next clue. The first team to check in was still awarded a prize, but the last team to check in was not eliminated and did not have to perform a Speed Bump. The Express Pass, introduced in the previous season, allowed a team to bypass one single task later in the season. The last team to complete the first task was forced to complete a U-Turn in the next leg, performing both tasks of the leg's Detour.

=== Casting ===
Phil Keoghan described all of the contestants as teams that "came so close to winning, but, for one reason or another, just didn't quite make it over the finish line in first place.” Keoghan gave examples of two teams: Zev and Justin from season 15, who had finished first on a leg, but lost a passport too late to continue racing; and Kisha & Jennifer from season 14, who took an ill-timed restroom break while racing to the Pit Stop and were eliminated. The prior experience of all the teams in previous seasons allowed the producers to increase the difficulty of the tasks and challenges. All of the teams were from recent seasons of The Amazing Race. According to Bertram van Munster, they selected more recent teams because "if we're digging too far back, people might not even remember who they were". Season 14 was represented by five of the 11 teams; van Munster called that "a very unique season" and justified its larger proportion of teams. Although they had considered mother and son fan-favorites Toni and Dallas Imbimbo from season 13, Keoghan stated they felt the other selected teams had "the best stories and the best motivation" for casting. During an interview with CBS's The Early Show, season 17 runners-up Brook Roberts and Claire Champlin revealed they were asked to take part on the season, but could not due to Champlin's pregnancy.

== Release ==
=== Marketing ===
Snapple served as a sponsor this season, with "Snapple Real Facts" introduced during commercial breaks. The sixth leg of the season in Kolkata, India, featured several tasks involving a papaya-and-mango flavored tea that Snapple had developed and named after the show. Ford also sponsored the season, with their new Focus serving as a prize during the eighth leg.

== Contestants ==
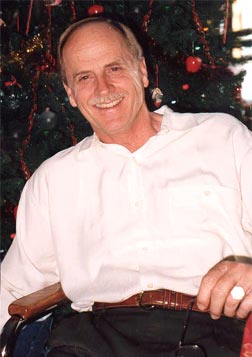
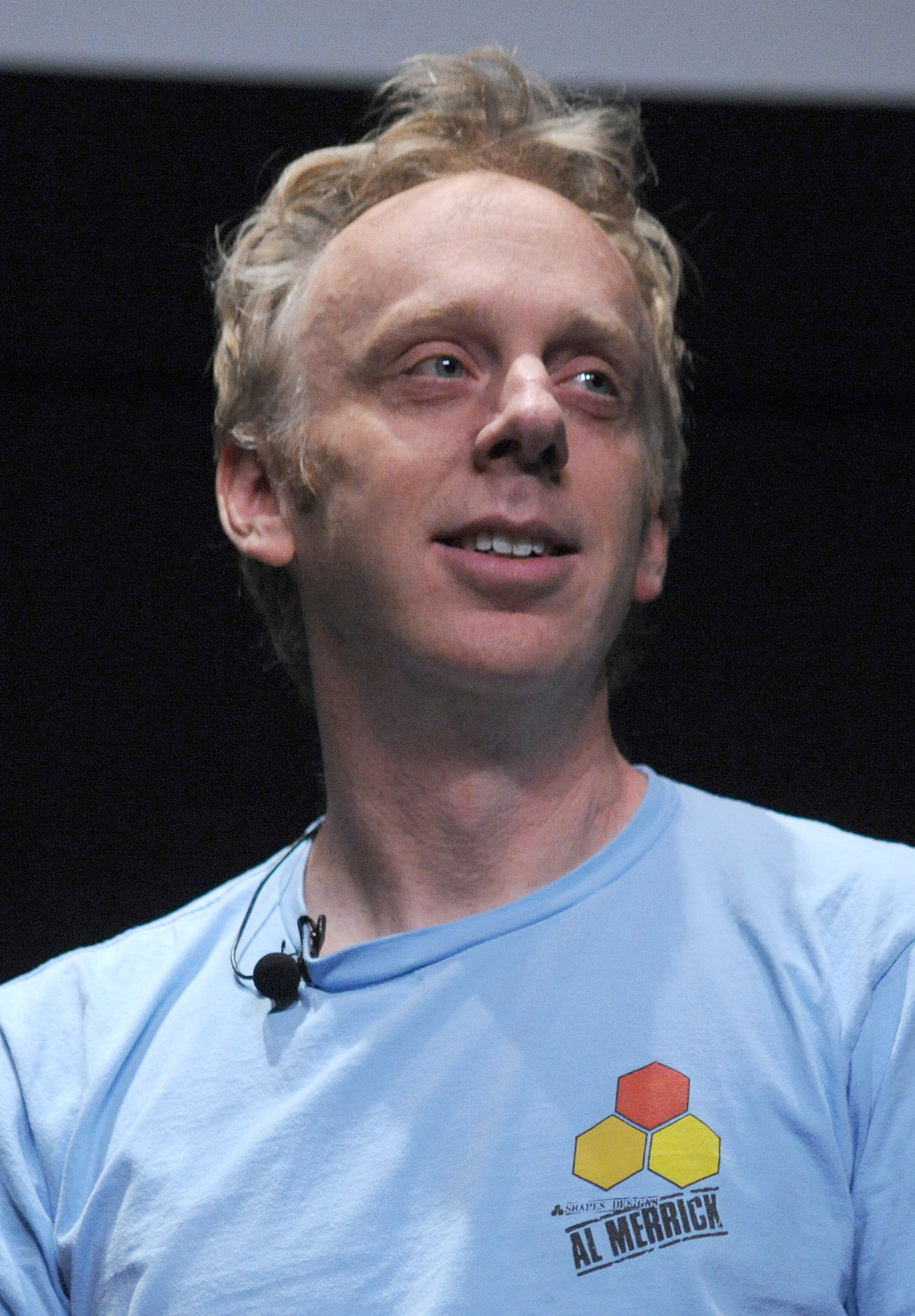
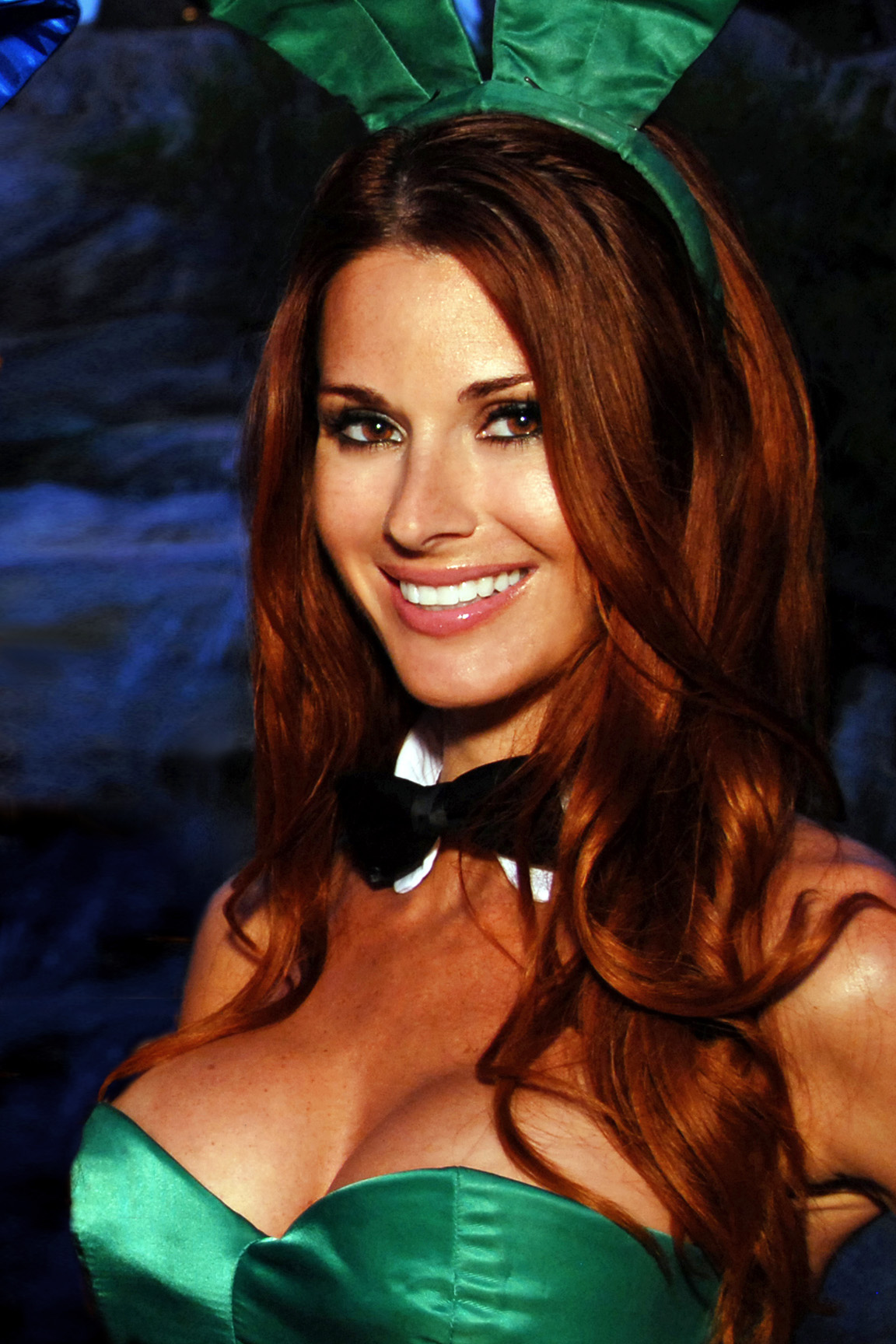
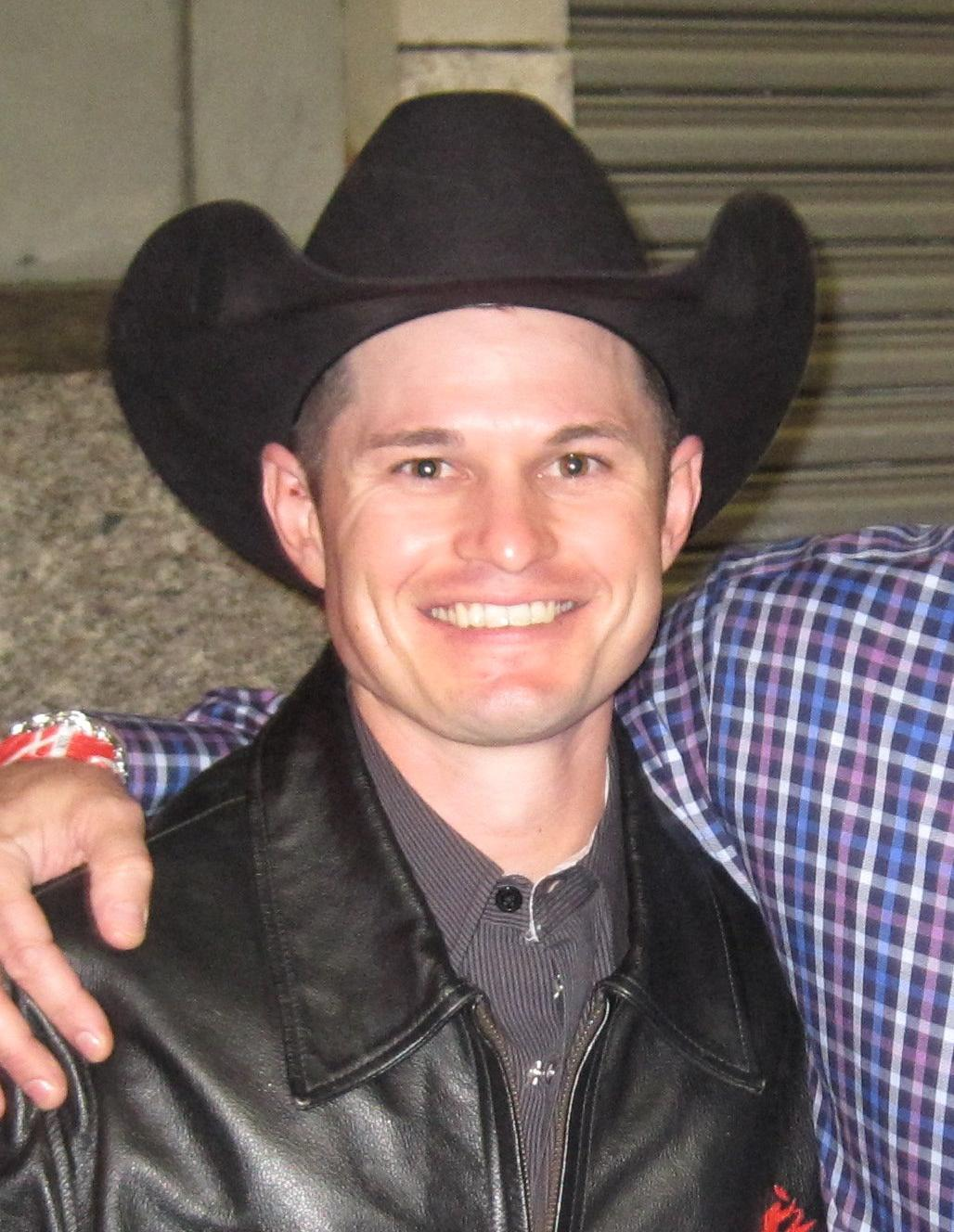
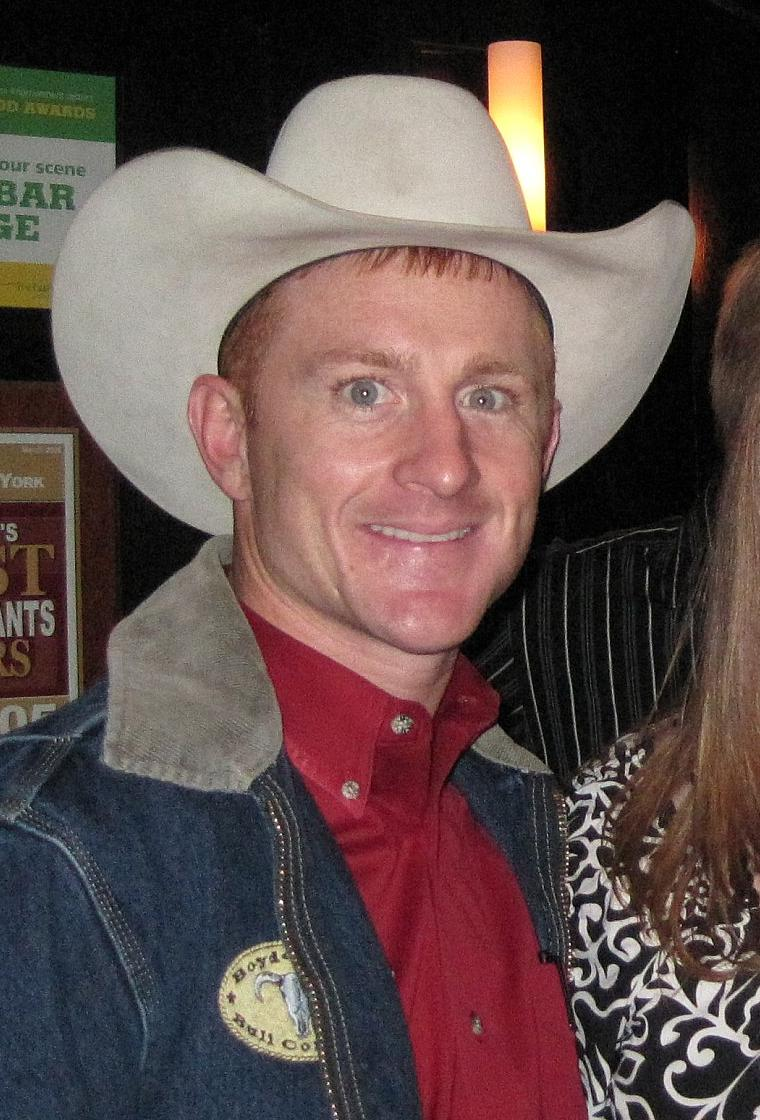
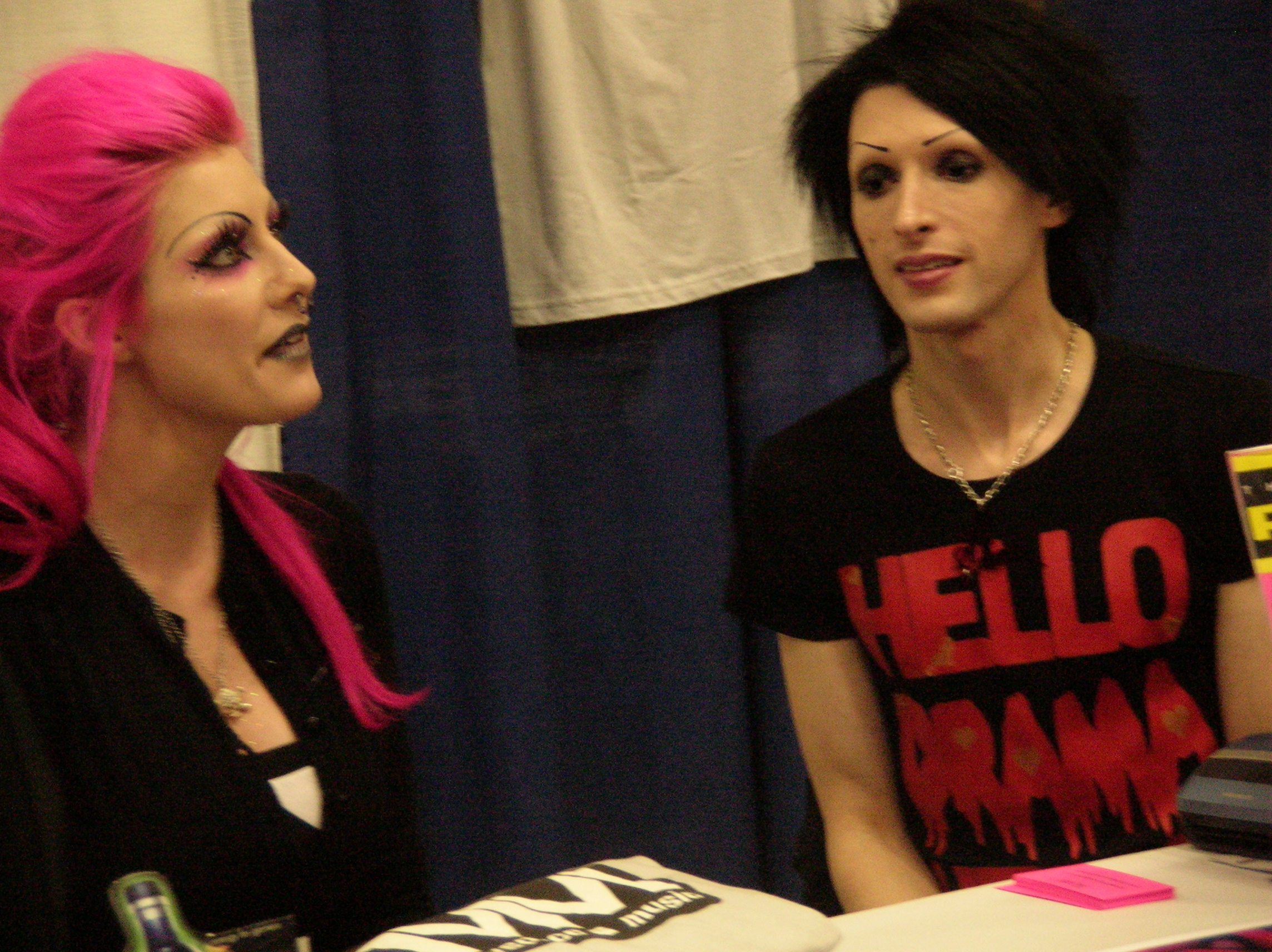
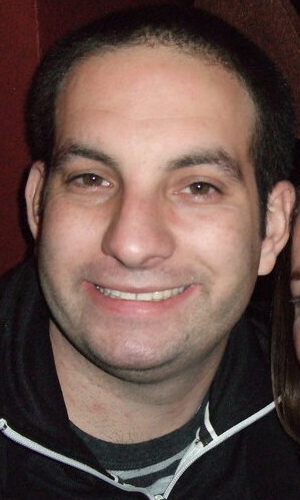
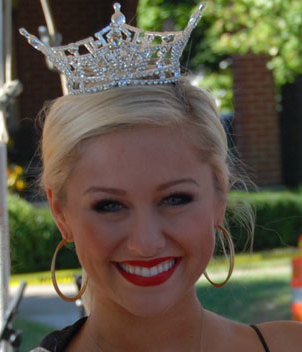
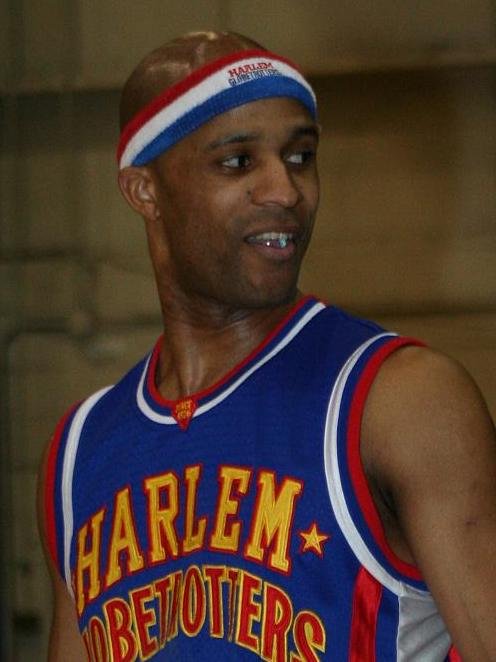
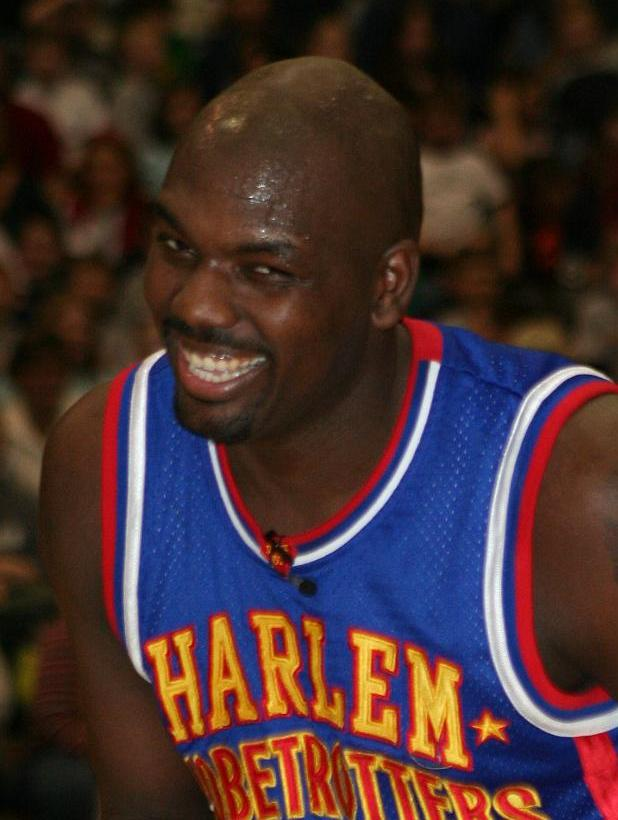
From left to right: Mel White, Mike White, Jaime Edmondson, Jet McCoy, Cord McCoy, Vyxsin Fiala, Kent Kaliber, Zev Glassenberg, Mallory Ervin, "Flight Time" Lang, and "Big Easy" Lofton

Contestants	Age	Relationship	Hometown	Status
Amanda Blackledge	25	Engaged; The Amazing Race 14	Pismo Beach, California	Eliminated 1st (in Broken Hill, Australia)
Kris Klicka	27	Engaged; The Amazing Race 14	Pismo Beach, California	Eliminated 1st (in Broken Hill, Australia)
Mel White	70	Father & Son; The Amazing Race 14	Lynchburg, Virginia	Eliminated 2nd (in Yokosuka, Japan)
Mike White	40	Father & Son; The Amazing Race 14	Los Angeles, California	Eliminated 2nd (in Yokosuka, Japan)
Jaime Edmondson	32	Former NFL Cheerleaders; The Amazing Race 14	Fort Lauderdale, Florida	Eliminated 3rd (in Kunming, China)
Cara Rosenthal	28	Former NFL Cheerleaders; The Amazing Race 14	Boca Raton, Florida	Eliminated 3rd (in Kunming, China)
Margie Adams	53	Mother & Son; The Amazing Race 14	Colorado Springs, Colorado	Eliminated 4th (in Kolkata, India)
Luke Adams	25	Mother & Son; The Amazing Race 14	Colorado Springs, Colorado	Eliminated 4th (in Kolkata, India)
Ron Hsu	61	Father & Daughter; The Amazing Race 12	Tacoma, Washington	Eliminated 5th (in Ramnagar, India)
Christina Hsu	29	Father & Daughter; The Amazing Race 12	Washington, D.C.	Eliminated 5th (in Ramnagar, India)
Jet McCoy	31	Cowboys & Brothers; The Amazing Race 16	Ada, Oklahoma	Eliminated 6th (in Zermatt, Switzerland)
Cord McCoy	30	Cowboys & Brothers; The Amazing Race 16	Tupelo, Oklahoma	Eliminated 6th (in Zermatt, Switzerland)
Kent Kaliber	35	Dating Goths; The Amazing Race 12	Los Angeles, California	Eliminated 7th (in Zermatt, Switzerland)
Vyxsin Fiala	32	Dating Goths; The Amazing Race 12	Los Angeles, California	Eliminated 7th (in Zermatt, Switzerland)
Zev Glassenberg	28	Best Friends; The Amazing Race 15	Sherman Oaks, California	Eliminated 8th (in Niterói, Brazil)
Justin Kanew	31	Best Friends; The Amazing Race 15	Los Angeles, California	Eliminated 8th (in Niterói, Brazil)
Gary Ervin	53	Father & Daughter; The Amazing Race 17	Morganfield, Kentucky	Third place
Mallory Ervin	25	Father & Daughter; The Amazing Race 17	Morganfield, Kentucky	Third place
Herbert "Flight Time" Lang	34	Harlem Globetrotters; The Amazing Race 15	Brinkley, Arkansas	Runners-up
Nathaniel "Big Easy" Lofton	29	Harlem Globetrotters; The Amazing Race 15	New Orleans, Louisiana	Runners-up
Kisha Hoffman	30	Sisters; The Amazing Race 14	The Bronx, New York	Winners
Jen Hoffman	26	Sisters; The Amazing Race 14	Louisville, Kentucky	Winners

The teams cited the following details from their respective races as their reason for having "unfinished business":

- From The Amazing Race 12
  - Kent and Vyxsin: They suffered a communications breakdown in Tuscany due to their lack of experience driving a manual transmission vehicle, resulting in them coming in last on a non-elimination leg and having to complete a Speed Bump on the next leg. They also wasted their U-Turn by erroneously using it on a team who was ahead of them. Note: In season 12, Kent went by the name Kynt.
  - Ron and Christina: They had a lead for most of the final leg in Anchorage until Christina had difficulty at the final Roadblock.
- From The Amazing Race 14
  - Amanda and Kris: They were U-Turned by Margie and Luke in Siberia.
  - Jaime and Cara: Their taxi driver in Maui got lost on the way to the final Roadblock destination.
  - Kisha and Jen: They were U-Turned in Beijing. In addition, on the way to the Pit Stop, Jen took an emergency bathroom break after drinking four bottles of water during the Roadblock, allowing Jaime and Cara to squeak past them to the Pit Stop. As a result, they came in last place and were eliminated.
  - Margie and Luke: They were in the lead for most of the final leg in Maui, until Luke stumbled at the final Roadblock, costing them the win.
  - Mel and Mike: Their taxi driver took them to the wrong place in Phuket, putting them behind all the other teams. They could not recover from this setback and were eliminated.
- From The Amazing Race 15
  - Flight Time and Big Easy: Big Easy could not complete the Roadblock in Prague, and took a four-hour penalty, resulting in their elimination.
  - Zev and Justin: After checking in first in Phnom Penh, they realized they had lost Zev's passport and were unable to find it before all of the other teams checked in.
- From The Amazing Race 16
  - Jet and Cord: On the plane from Shanghai to San Francisco during the final leg, Dan and Jordan were able to move up to first class, giving them a lead that Jet and Cord were never able to overcome.
- From The Amazing Race 17
  - Gary and Mallory: They got lost for many hours trying to find the Roadblock location in Oman and ended up losing to Nat and Kat by five minutes.

Future appearances

Margie and Luke, Flight Time and Big Easy, and Jet and Cord returned for a third time to compete on The Amazing Race: All-Stars. Mallory Ervin returned on the same season to partner with Mark Jackson when his partner, William "Bopper" Minton, was not medically cleared to compete. Flight Time and Big Easy and Jet and Cord appeared on The Amazing Race: 25 Years Around the World.

Outside of The Amazing Race, Mallory appeared on the Discovery Channel reality show Backyard Oil in 2013. On May 25, 2016, Flight Time and Big Easy appeared on an Amazing Race-themed primetime special of The Price Is Right. Mike White later competed on Survivor: David vs. Goliath. Flight Time and Big Easy appeared on 100 Day Dream Home in 2021. In 2026, Mike White competed on Survivor 50: In the Hands of the Fans.

== Results ==
The following teams are listed with their placements in each leg. Placements are listed in finishing order.

- A red placement with a dagger (†) indicates that the team was eliminated.
- An underlined blue placement with a double-dagger (‡) indicates that the team was the last to arrive at a Pit Stop in a non-elimination leg, and had to perform a Speed Bump task in the following leg.
- An italicized and underlined placement indicates that the team was the last to arrive at a Pit Stop, but there was no rest period at the Pit Stop and all teams were instructed to continue racing. There was no required Speed Bump task in the next leg.
- A purple ε indicates that the team used an Express Pass on that leg to bypass one of their tasks.
- A brown ⊃ indicates that the team used the U-Turn and a brown ⊂ indicates the team on the receiving end of the U-Turn.

Team placement (by leg)
Team	1	2	3	4	5	6	7	8	9	10	11	12
Kisha & Jen	3rd	4th	4th	5th	4th	6th	3rd	4th	2nd	2nd	2nd	1st
Flight Time & Big Easy	5th	2nd	5th (Note: Flight Time and Big Easy initially arrived 3rd, but were issued a 30-minute penalty when Ron and Christina told Phil that Flight Time and Big Easy had taken their fanny pack by accident and did not return it. Ron and Christina were moved up to 3rd; Kisha and Jen checked in during this penalty time, dropping Flight Time and Big Easy to 5th.)	6th	6th⊂ (Note: Jaime and Cara chose to use the U-Turn on Flight Time and Big Easy.)	7th	1st	2nd	5th⊃ (Note: Flight Time and Big Easy chose to use the U-Turn on Jet and Cord.)	1st	3rd	2nd
Gary & Mallory	1st	9th	2nd	3rd	2ndε (Note: Gary and Mallory used their Express Pass to bypass the Roadblock on this leg.)	1st	4th	6th‡	4th	3rd	1st	3rd
Zev & Justin	4th	1st	1st	8th	8th	4th	2nd	1st	1st	4th	4th†	
Kent & Vyxsin	10th	7th	7th	9th (Note: This team arrived last at the Pit Stop, but they were instructed to continue racing. There was no Speed Bump task in the next leg.)	5th⊃ (Note: Kent and Vyxsin chose to use the U-Turn on Jaime and Cara.) (Note: Kent and Vyxsin initially arrived 4th, but were issued a 30-minute penalty for not taking the required flight to Kunming. Kisha and Jen checked in during this penalty time, dropping Kent and Vyxsin to 5th.)	5th	6th	3rd	3rd	5th† (Note: Kent and Vyxsin initially arrived 3rd, but were issued a 30-minute penalty for taking a taxi instead of going on foot to the Pit Stop as their clue had instructed. Gary and Mallory, and Zev and Justin, checked in during this penalty time, dropping Kent and Vyxsin to last.)		
Jet & Cord	11th	3rd	6th	2nd	1st	2nd	5th	5th	6th†⊂			
Ron & Christina	8th	10th	3rd	4th	7th	3rd	7th†					
Margie & Luke	7th	5th	8th	1st	3rd	8th†						
Jaime & Cara	6th	8th	9th	7th	9th†^{⊂}_{⊃}							
Mel & Mike	9th	6th	10th†									
Amanda & Kris	2nd	11th†										

== Race summary ==
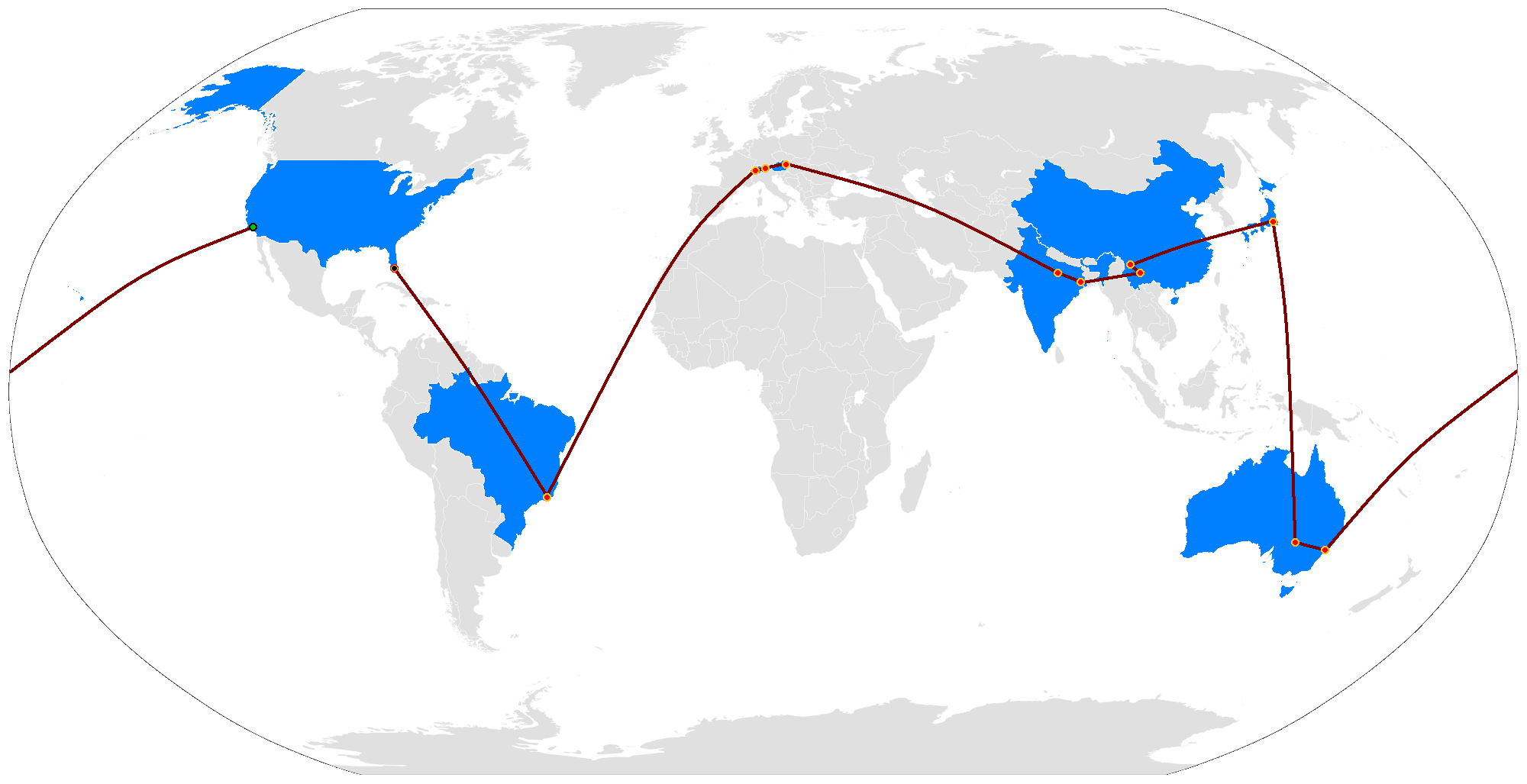
The complete route of The Amazing Race: Unfinished Business.

Destinations	Air travel Rail travel Water travel Bus travel Helicopter travel Bicycle travel Gondola travel
Route Markers	Detour Roadblock U-Turn Speed Bump Pit Stop

=== Leg 1 (United States → Australia) ===
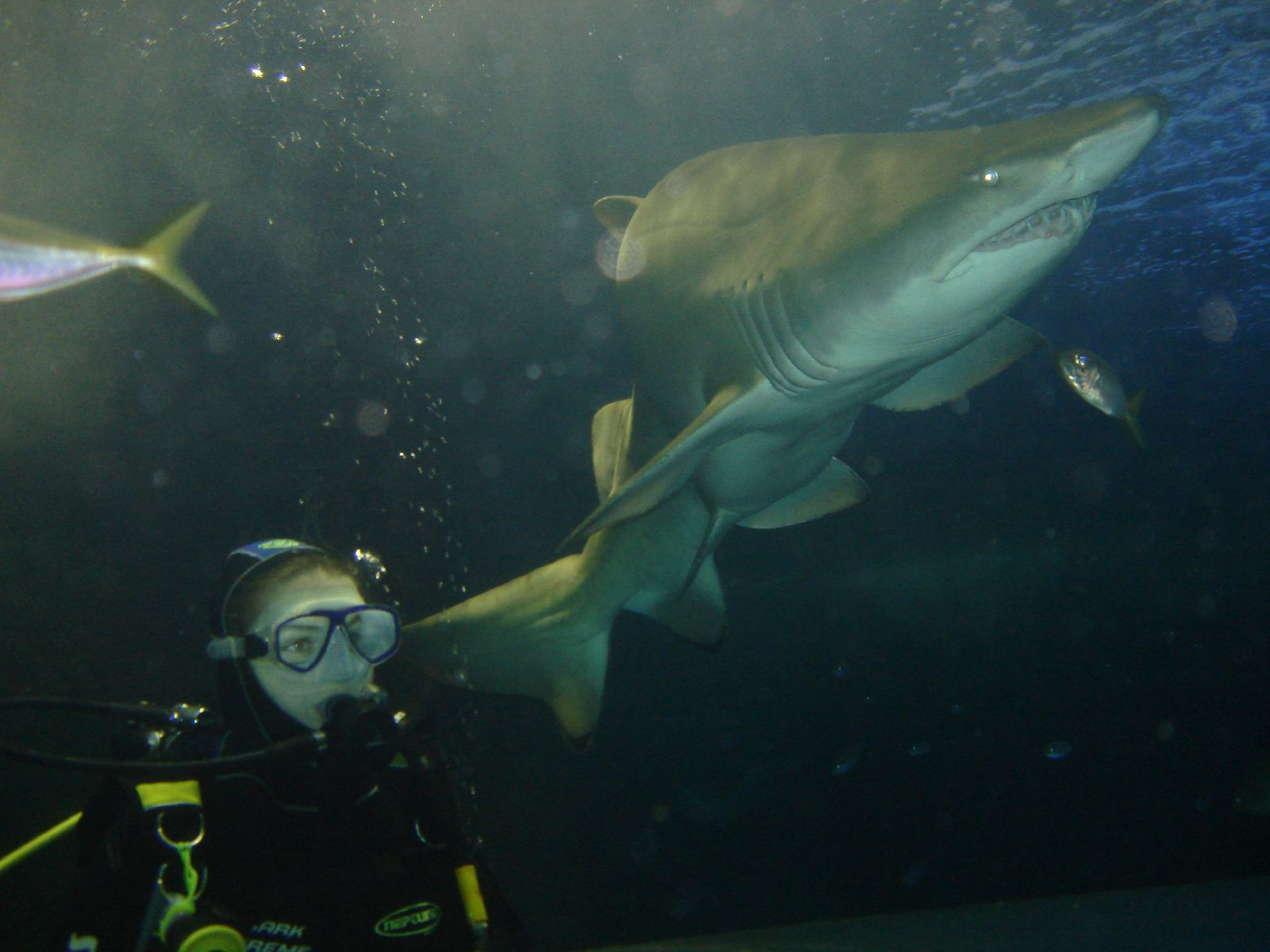
At Oceanworld Manly in Sydney, racers participated in a Roadblock where they did a scuba dive in the aquarium's shark tank.

- Episode 1: "Head Down and Hold On" (February 20, 2011)
- Prize: The Express Pass (awarded to Gary and Mallory)

Locations

- Palm Springs, California (San Gorgonio Pass Wind Farm) (Starting Line)
- Los Angeles → Sydney, Australia
- Sydney (International Airport Railway Station → City Centre)
- Sydney (City Centre → Manly)
- Sydney (Oceanworld Manly)
- Sydney (Manly 16 ft Skiff Sailing Club)
- Sydney (Shelly Beach)

Episode summary

- At the San Gorgonio Pass Wind Farm, teams had to search through a field containing hundreds of paper airplanes inscribed with various airline names for one matching the clue "Queensland and Northern Territory Aerial Services": Qantas. Once teams presented a Qantas airplane to Phil, he gave them their first clue and tickets for one of two flights to Sydney, Australia. In addition, the last team to complete the task – Amanda and Kris – received a penalty: they would have to complete a U-Turn at the season's first Detour.
- The first eight teams were given tickets on the first Qantas flight and the last three teams received tickets on a flight scheduled to arrive 90 minutes later. However, due to a medical emergency on the first flight, that flight was diverted to Honolulu, allowing the three teams on the second flight to arrive in Sydney first. Once there, teams had to travel by ferry to Manly, and then travel on foot to Oceanworld Manly, where they found their next clue.
- In this season's first Roadblock, one team member had to scuba dive into the Oceanworld shark and ray tank and search the floor of the aquarium for a compass. The compass included a guide to decode a message hidden in series of nautical flags outside. Racers had to correctly decode the message, go to the Manly 16 ft Skiff Sailing Club, find the Commodore, and give him the message – "I am between the devil and the deep blue sea" – to receive their next clue.
- After the Roadblock, teams had to join a sailing crew and sail a 16ft Skiff along a water course to a series of buoys that held their next clue, which directed them to the Pit Stop: Shelly Beach.

Additional notes

- Graham Keating, Sydney's town crier, and the Pit Stop greeter in leg 8 of season 2, made a cameo appearance at the beginning of this leg.
- There was no rest period at the Pit Stop and all teams were instead instructed to continue racing.

=== Leg 2 (Australia) ===
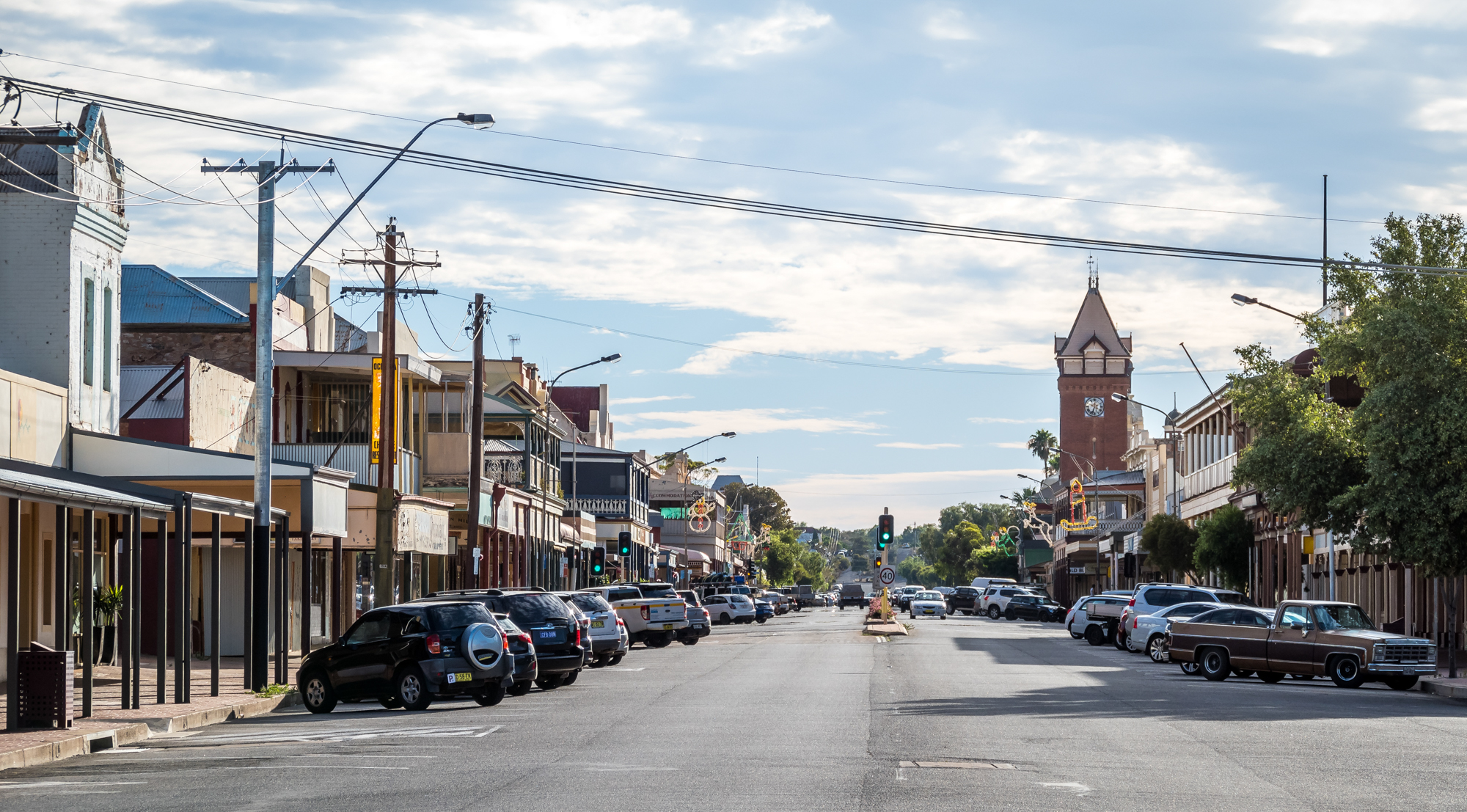
Teams traveled to the city of Broken Hill in the Australian Outback.

- Episode 2: "I Never Looked So Foolish in My Whole Entire Life" (February 27, 2011)
- Prize: A trip for two to Cancún, Mexico (awarded to Zev and Justin)
- Eliminated: Amanda and Kris

Locations

- Sydney (Sydney Town Hall – To Sail To Stop Sculpture)
- Sydney → Broken Hill (Broken Hill Airport)
- Broken Hill (The Living Desert)
- Broken Hill (Central Football Club)
- Broken Hill (Intersection of Mercury Street & Bismuth Street)
- Broken Hill (Junction Mine)

Episode summary

- At the previous Pit Stop, teams received their clue from Phil, which instructed them to find "To Sail To Stop" and had to figure that this referred to a sculpture of an anchor near Sydney Town Hall. There, teams had to sign up for one of two charter flights leaving the next morning to Broken Hill in the Outback. Once there, teams had to choose a marked car with their next clue and drive themselves to the Living Desert.
- This season's first Detour was a choice between Spirit World or Natural World. In Spirit World, teams had to make a traditional Australian Aboriginal stone mosaic based on a model, and then perform a dance on top of the mosaic before receiving their clue. In Natural World, teams had to make traditional Australian Aboriginal paintings by spraying a mix of water and pigment to create four silhouette images on a piece of slate, after which they received their next clue.
- After the Detour, teams were instructed to return to Broken Hill and find the "home of the Magpies", which they had to figure out was a reference to the Broken Hill Football League's Central Magpies Australian football stadium: Central Football Club. At the football club, teams dressed up as kangaroos and were given a periodic table with the symbols Hg and Bi highlighted. They had to figure out that these were the symbols for mercury and bismuth, respectively, and that they were also the names of two streets in town that met at an intersection where their next clue was located. Teams then had to check in at the Pit Stop: Junction Mine.

Additional note

- Amanda and Kris had a required U-Turn because they were the last to find the Qantas paper airplane at the beginning of leg 1, so they had to complete both sides of the Detour.

=== Leg 3 (Australia → Japan) ===
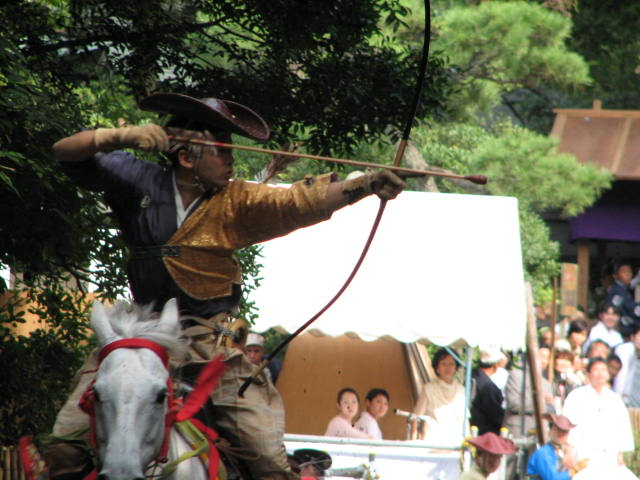
The Roadblock in Kamakura had racers participating in yabusame: traditional Japanese mounted archery.

- Episode 3: "We Had a Lot of Evil Spirits Apparently" (March 6, 2011)
- Prize: A trip for two to Costa Rica (awarded to Zev and Justin)
- Eliminated: Mel and Mike

Locations

- Broken Hill → Sydney (Central Railway Station)
- Sydney → Tokyo, Japan
- Tokyo (Shibuya – Rotating Parking Garage)
- Kamakura (Tsurugaoka Hachimangū – Yabusame Dojo)
- Minamiashigara (Daiyūzan Station – Kintarō Statue)
- Minamiashigara (Yuhi Falls or Madarame Farm)
- Yokosuka (Kurihama – Commodore Perry Monument)

Episode summary

- During the Pit Stop, teams boarded a train that took them back to Sydney, and they began the leg on the train platform at the Central railway station. Teams were instructed to fly to Tokyo, Japan. Once there, teams had to travel to the rotating parking garage in Shibuya to find their next clue. Teams had to ask the garage attendant for a vehicle before driving themselves to Tsurugaoka Hachimangū, where they found their next clue.
- In this leg's Roadblock, one team member had to dress as a traditional samurai archer and learn a yabusame ritual through observation, consisting of a meditative ritual before a traditional pose with the yumi bow. Once they performed the first two aspects of the ritual to the dojo master's satisfaction, they had to mount a rotating wooden horse and hit a wooden target with an arrow to receive their next clue.
- After the Roadblock, teams had to drive to the Daiyūzan Station and search the grounds for the Kintarō statue to find their next clue.
- This leg's Detour was a choice between Prayer of Purity or Frog of Luck. In Prayer of Purity, teams had to don keikogis and travel to the nearby woods, where they took part in a Shinto cleansing ritual. First, they had to perform a prayer that consisted of a chant, lighting incense, and then shouting while thrusting a bamboo stick out in front of them. Afterward, they had to stand under the Yuhi Falls and endure being drenched in 45 °F (7 °C) water for one minute before receiving their next clue. In Frog of Luck, teams had to put on fundoshi before walking to a mud pit, where they had to search for a toy frog in the mud while having mud thrown at them by locals. Once teams found a frog, they had to present it to the nearby master for their next clue.
- After the Detour, teams had to check in at the Pit Stop: the Commodore Perry Monument in Yokosuka.

Additional note

- Mel & Mike were treated for hypothermia while trying to complete the Detour. They were unable to complete the task and instead went directly to the Pit Stop for elimination.

=== Leg 4 (Japan → China) ===
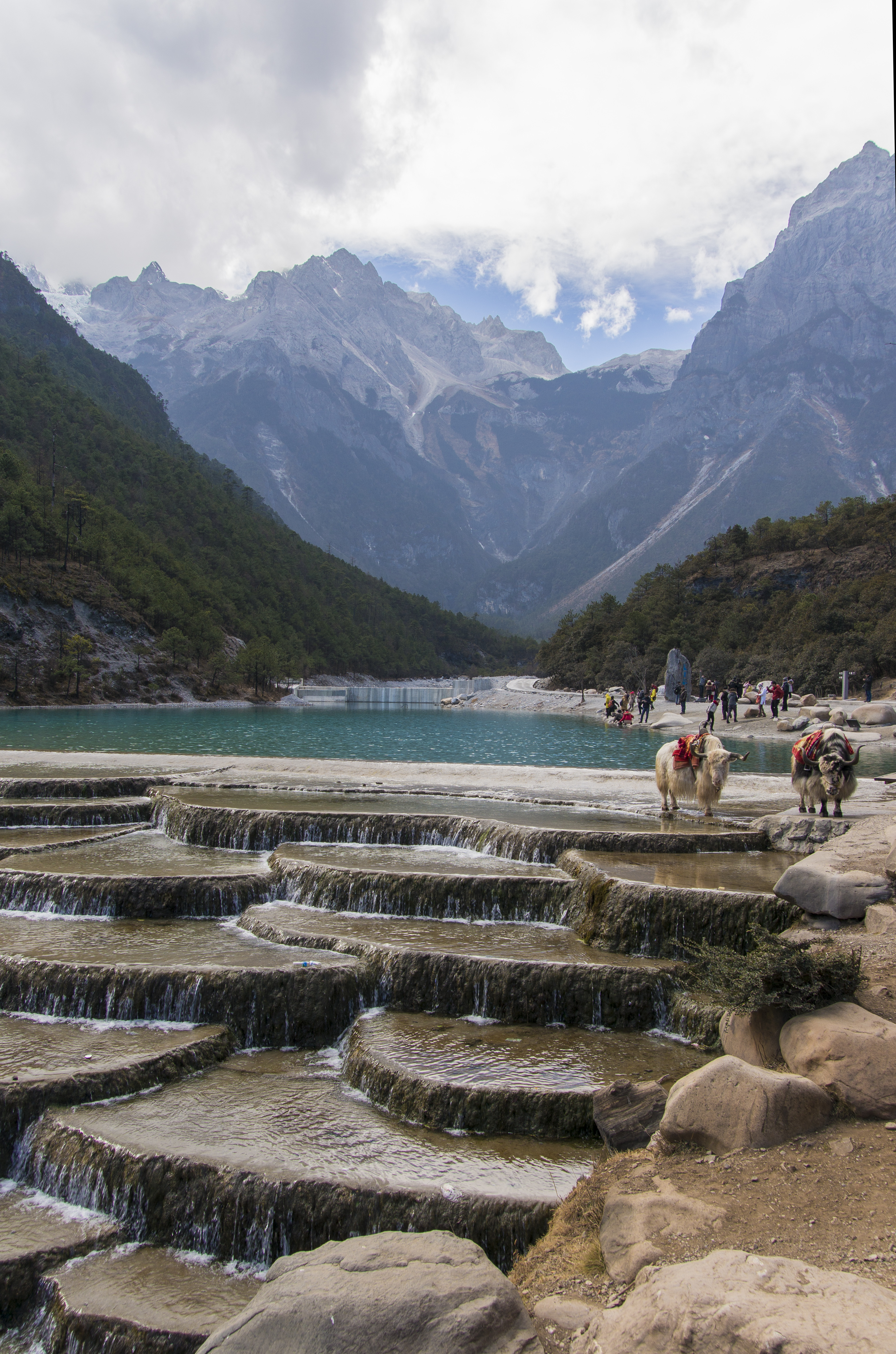
In Lijiang, teams rode yaks on the terraces of the Baishui River beneath Jade Dragon Snow Mountain.

- Episode 4: "This is the Most Stupid Day Ever" (March 13, 2011)
- Prize: A trip for two to Aruba (awarded to Margie and Luke)

Locations

- Yokosuka (Kurihama – Commodore Perry Monument)
- Tokyo → Kunming, China
- or Kunming → Lijiang
- Lijiang (Jade Dragon Mountain)
- Lijiang (Spruce Meadow)
- Lijiang (Old Town of Lijiang – Selling Grass Place)
- Lijiang (Old Town of Lijiang – Candy Shop or Nanmen Square & Wencheng Palace)
- Lijiang (Lion Hill – Eternal Tower)

Episode summary

- At the start of this leg, teams were instructed to fly to Lijiang, China. Due to limited flights to Lijiang, all teams had to take a mandatory flight to Kunming. Once there, teams could either travel by train or by plane to Lijiang before traveling to Jade Dragon Mountain. There, teams had to properly saddle a yak, which one team member had to ride across a portion of the Baishui River to receive their next clue, which instructed teams to ride a gondola up the mountain to Spruce Meadow and search for their next clue.
- In this leg's Roadblock, one team member had to search through tens of thousands of wooden charms for a set of twelve that corresponded to the symbols of the Chinese zodiac. Once they collected the twelve charms, they had to place them on a mobile in the correct order according to Chinese myth to receive their next clue.
- After the Roadblock, teams traveled by charter bus to the Old Town of Lijiang. Once there, teams had to put a wish into a prayer wheel at Selling Grass Place through the slot that corresponded to their sign of the Chinese zodiac and call out the name of their sign to receive their next clue.
- This leg's Detour was a choice between Hammer or Horn. In Hammer, teams traveled to a candy shop, where they used wooden mallets to pulverize molten peanut brittle to the right consistency. They then had to cut it into pieces and box them before the candy maker gave them their next clue. In Horn, teams traveled to Nanmen Square where they had to pick up a large traditional horn and lead a group of Nakhi dancers to Wencheng Palace on the other side of town to receive their next clue.
- After the Detour, teams had to check in at the Pit Stop: the Eternal Tower on Lion Hill.

Additional notes

- Kent and Vyxsin had difficulty finding Narita International Airport in Tokyo and missed the mandatory flight to Kunming, so they took a later flight to Kunming.
- There was no rest period at the Pit Stop and all teams were instead instructed to continue racing. There was no elimination.

=== Leg 5 (China) ===
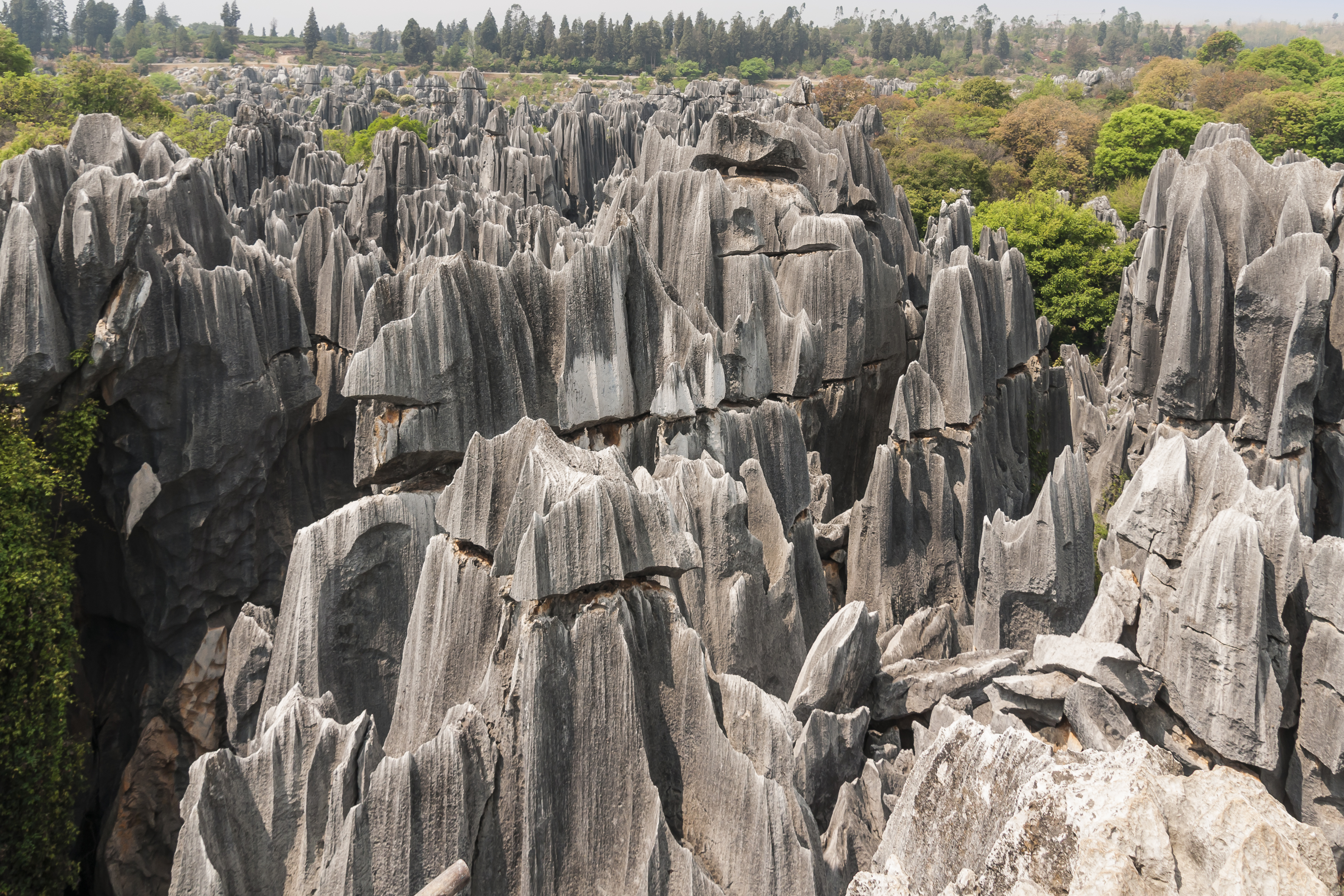
Teams visited Stone Forest outside Kunming for a Roadblock paying homage to Yunnan's contributions to the field of paleontology.

- Episode 5: "Don't Ruin the Basketball Game" (March 20, 2011)
- Prize: US$5,000 each (awarded to Jet and Cord)
- Eliminated: Jaime and Cara

Locations

- Lijiang → Kunming
- Kunming (Dounan Flower Market)
- Kunming (Golden Horse and Jade Cock Memorial Archway)
- Kunming (Makye Ame Shangri-la Tibetan Palatial Restaurant or China Great Wall Asset Management)
- Kunming (Yunnan Province Cultural Center)
- Shilin (Stone Forest)
- Kunming (Green Lake Park)

Episode summary

- At the start of this leg, teams were instructed to travel by train to Kunming. Once there, teams had to travel to the Dounan Flower Market to find their next clue, which directed them to the Golden Horse and Jade Cock Memorial Archway.
- This leg's Detour was a choice between Honor the Past or Embrace the Future. In Honor the Past, teams had to don traditional Tibetan outfits at the Makye Ame Shangri-la Tibetan Palatial Restaurant and watch a theater troupe. Without taking any notes, teams then had to go offstage and arrange a series of fifteen dolls dressed like the actors in the order of their procession on stage to receive their clue. In Embrace the Future, teams had to don safety gear and carry three heavy boxes up to the roof of the China Great Wall Asset Management Company building. Teams then had to assemble a solar water heating system to receive their next clue.
- After the Detour, teams were only given a photo of their next location and had to figure out that it was the Yunnan Province Cultural Center – referred to in the show as the "Chinese Minority Heritage Center" – to find their next clue, which directed them to the Stone Forest.
- In this leg's Roadblock, one team member had to properly assemble a life-size 20-foot-long (6.1 m) model of a Dilophosaurus to receive their next clue. If, at any point, the paleontologist believed that the model was structurally unsafe, the racer had to fix their mistake before they could continue. Gary and Mallory used their Express Pass to bypass this Roadblock.
- After the Roadblock, teams had to check in at the Pit Stop: Green Lake Park.

Additional note

- This leg featured a Double U-Turn. Kent and Vyxsin chose to use the U-Turn on Jaime and Cara, while Jaime and Cara chose to use the U-Turn on Flight Time and Big Easy.

=== Leg 6 (China → India) ===
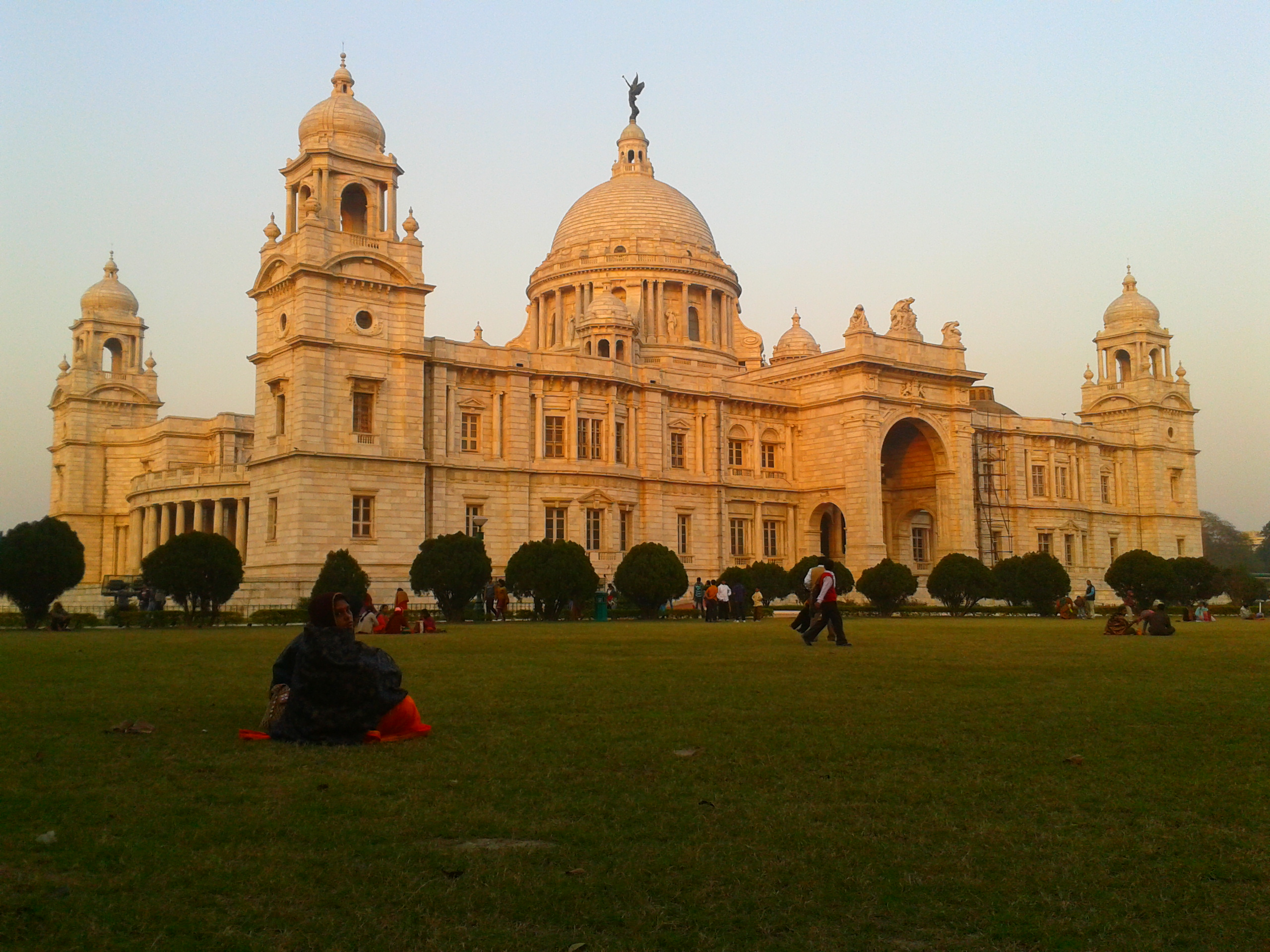
The grounds surrounding the Victoria Memorial in Kolkata, following a Tea Horse Road-focused leg, served as the Pit Stop on this leg.

- Episode 6: "I Feel Like a Monkey in a Circus Parade" (March 27, 2011)
- Prize: An Indian dinner for two featuring Bollywood-inspired entertainment, and ₹1,000,000 (US$20,000) (awarded to Gary and Mallory)
- Eliminated: Margie and Luke

Locations

- Kunming (Green Lake Park)
- Kunming (Jin Fu Yi Zhan Tea Shop)
- Kunming → Kolkata, India
- Kolkata (Kolkata Town Hall)
- Kolkata (Jorasanko Thakur Bari – Tiwari Tea Stall)
- Kolkata (Rakhal Paul and Sons Statue Shop or Dey's Publishing House & Victoria Institution High School and College)
- Kolkata (Maidan – Fountain of Joy)

Episode summary

- At the start of this leg, teams had to travel to the Jin Fu Yi Zhan Tea Shop. There, they took part in a Chinese tea tasting ceremony and were given a taste of a tea that, unbeknownst to them at the time, would be featured in the upcoming Roadblock. Teams were given a brick of pu'er tea leaves that would also be needed at the Roadblock along with their next clue, which instructed them to fly to Kolkata, India. Once there, teams had to travel to the Kolkata Town Hall, where they found their next clue.
- In this leg's Roadblock, one team member had to take part in an Indian tea tasting ceremony. First, they had to bring a papaya, a mango, and the brick of tea that teams had received earlier to the tea auctioneer. They then had to search among several hundred teacups for one that held the same papaya-and-mango-infused tea that they had tasted in China to receive their next clue.
- After the Roadblock, teams were given a bottle of Snapple and had to figure out that their next clue was printed on the inside of the cap. The clue directed them to go to Jorasanko Thakur Bari in Jorasanko and search for the Tiwari Tea Stall, where they traded their Snapple bottle for their next clue.
- This leg's Detour was a choice between Hindu Art or Bengali Literature. In Hindu Art, teams had to travel to the Rakhal Paul and Sons Statue Shop and paint, dress, and adorn a statue of the Hindu god Ganesha to receive their next clue. In Bengali Literature, teams had to travel to the Dey's Publishing House and pick up eight bundles of children's books. They then had to direct a rickshaw school bus across town to the Victoria Institution High School and College and deliver the books to the headmistress' office to receive their next clue.
- After the Detour, teams had to check in at the Pit Stop: the Fountain of Joy in Maidan.

=== Leg 7 (India) ===
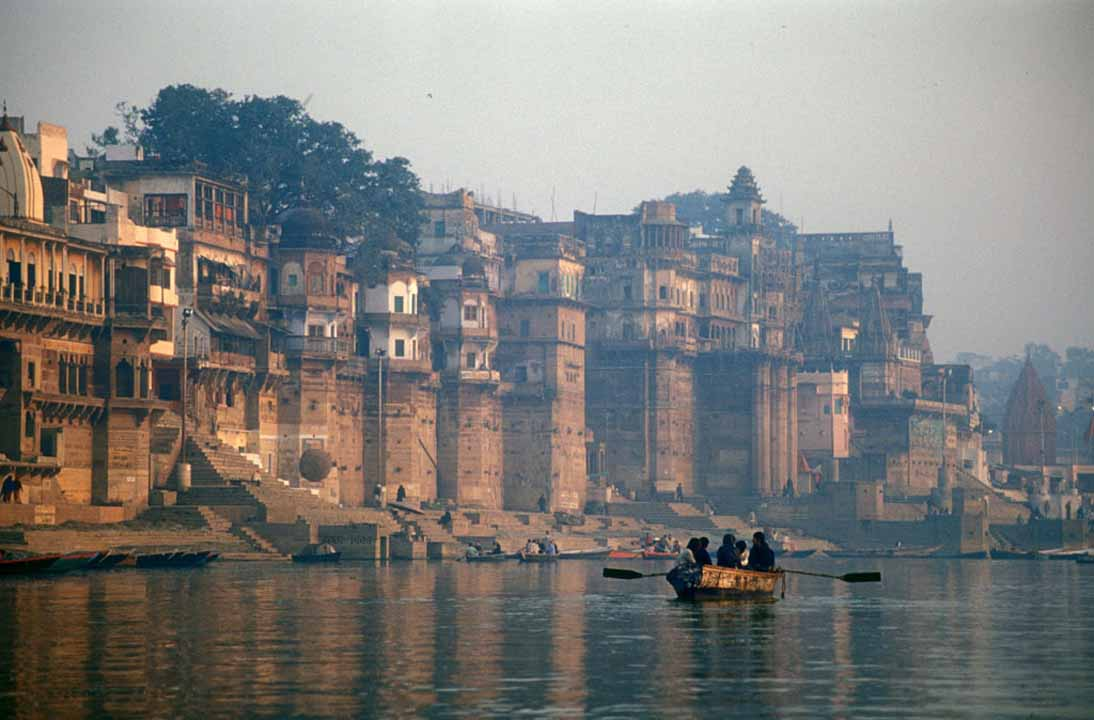
Teams visited the holy city of Varanasi on the shores of the Ganges River in this leg of the race.

- Episode 7: "You Don't Get Paid Unless You Win" (April 10, 2011)
- Prize: A trip for two to Hawaii (awarded to Flight Time and Big Easy)
- Eliminated: Ron and Christina

Locations

- Kolkata (Maidan – Fountain of Joy)
- Kolkata → Varanasi
- Varanasi (Tonga Stand)
- Varanasi (Tulsi Ghat – Swaminath Akhara)
- Varanasi (Ganges – Sakka Ghat or Ksameshwar Ghat)
- Ramnagar (Ramnagar Fort)

Episode summary

- At the start of this leg, teams were instructed to fly to Varanasi. Once there, teams had to find a tonga stand, where they found their next clue.
- In this leg's Roadblock, one team member had to search the streets of Varanasi for six different sadhus depicted in a series of photographs that they had been given. Each one gave them one of six pieces of a phrase described as "the meaning of life": "Once you're over the hill you pick up speed". Once they had all six fragments of the phrase, they had to provide the phrase to a seventh sadhu, who then gave them their next clue.
- After the Roadblock, teams had to travel to the Swaminath Akhara at Tulsi Ghat, where they had to find their next clue by a strongman.
- This leg's Detour was a choice between Feed the Fire or Feed the Buffalo. In Feed the Fire, teams traveled down the Ganges to Sakka Ghat, where they had to make fifty traditional fuel patties from water buffalo manure and then slap them against a wall to allow them to dry. When the supervisor was satisfied with their work, teams had to light a stove with dried fuel patties and boil milk for local children before receiving their clue. In Feed the Buffalo, teams had to cross the Ganges, collect two bales of hay, and then return to Ksameshwar Ghat, where they had to deliver the hay to a specific address to receive their next clue.
- After the Detour, teams had to check in at the Pit Stop: Ramnagar Fort in Ramnagar.

=== Leg 8 (India → Austria) ===
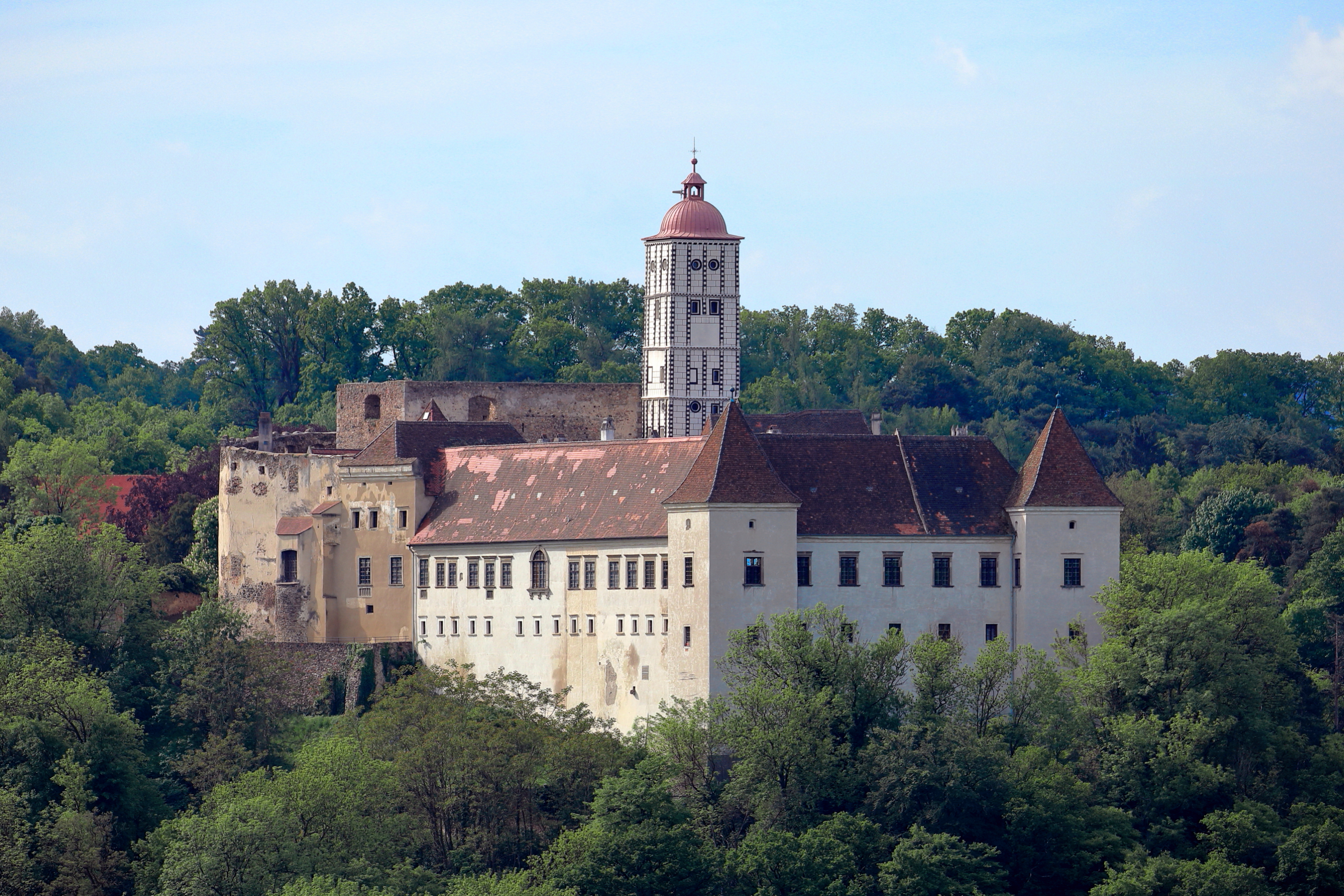
Teams' first destination in Austria was Schallaburg Castle in Schollach.

- Episode 8: "I Cannot Deal with Your Psycho Behavior" (April 17, 2011)
- Prize: A 2012 Ford Focus for each racer (awarded to Zev and Justin)

Locations

- Ramnagar (Ramnagar Fort)
- Varanasi → Vienna, Austria (Vienna International Airport)
- Schollach (Schallaburg Castle)
- Vienna (Austrian National Library – Prunksaal)
- Vienna (Sigmund Freud Museum & University of Vienna or Wiener Riesenrad)
- Salzburg (Sternbräu Restaurant)
- Salzburg (Aigen – Villa Trapp)

Episode summary

- At the start of this episode, teams were instructed to fly to Vienna, Austria. Once there, teams went to one of the parking garages at the Vienna International Airport and chose a vehicle, where they received a message from Phil directing them to put the car in reverse to activate the rear-view camera system in order to see their next clue. As they backed up, teams could see the name of their next destination on the pavement behind them: Schloss Schallaburg in Schollach.
- At Schallaburg Castle, teams were given a large book with a stamp on the front page with the text – Librarian Prunksaal/Österreichische Nationalbibliothek – directing them to drive to the Austrian National Library and find the librarian in the Prunksaal section, who traded them their next clue in exchange for their book.
- This leg's Detour was a choice between Long Hard Walk or Quick and Easy Meal. In Long Hard Walk, teams had to travel to the Sigmund Freud Museum and deliver a psychoanalysis couch to the former office of Sigmund Freud at the University of Vienna to receive their next clue. In Quick and Easy Meal, teams had to travel to the Wiener Riesenrad Ferris wheel, where they picked up two large servings of traditional Austrian cuisine: Wienerschnitzel, Sauerkraut, and Sachertorte. They then boarded one of the dining cars, where they had to finish both servings within one 12-minute revolution of the Ferris wheel before they could receive their next clue.
- After the Detour, teams had to drive to the Sternbräu Restaurant in Salzburg, where they found their next clue.
- In this leg's Roadblock, one team member had to don a traditional chimney sweep uniform, go onto a roof, and use a weight with wire mesh on a rope to clean one of the chimneys. After cleaning the chimney three times, racers had to go to the basement and open the chimney door that held their next clue, which directed them to the Pit Stop: Villa Trapp in Aigen.

Additional note

- This was a non-elimination leg.

=== Leg 9 (Austria → Liechtenstein → Switzerland) ===
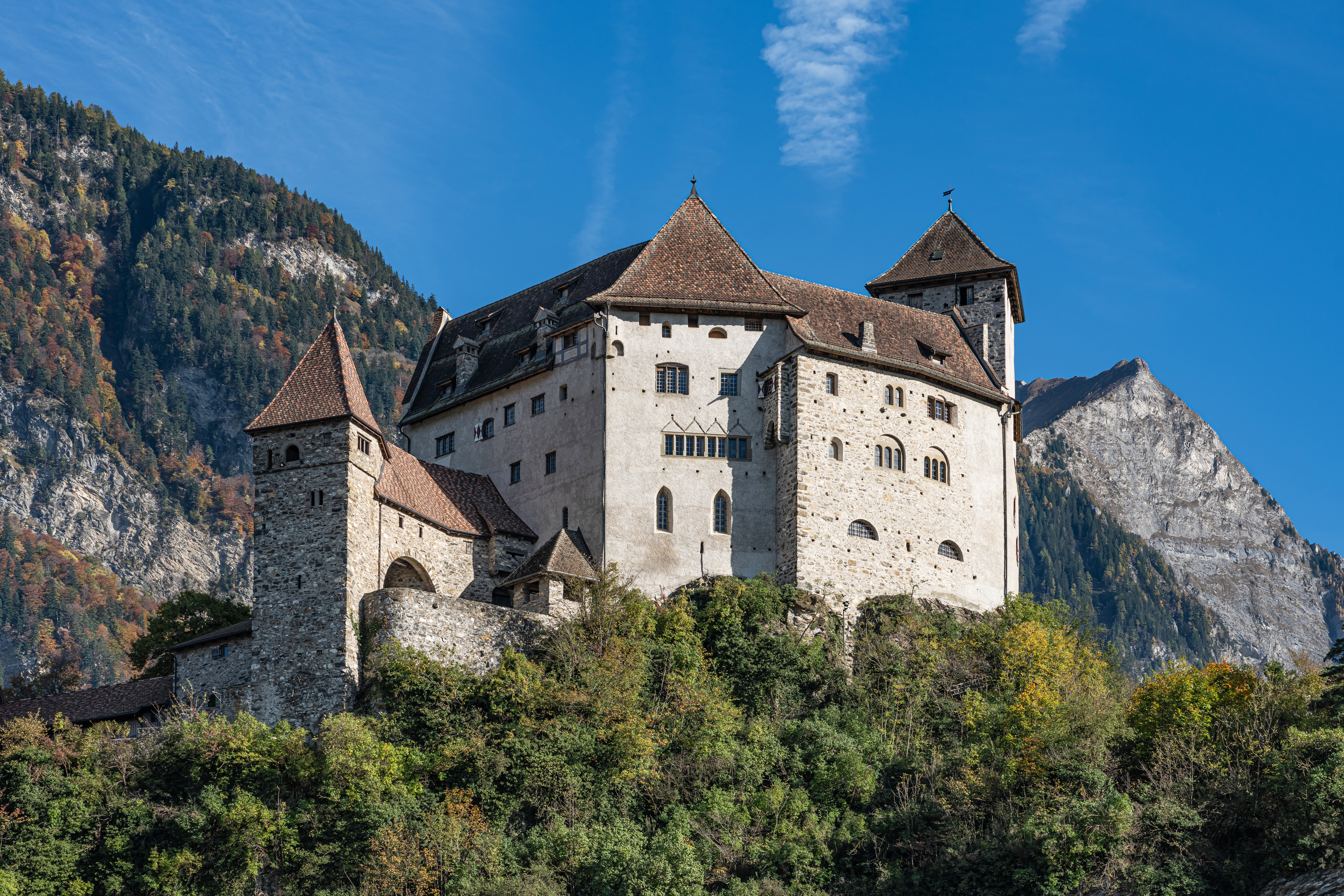
For the Roadblock in the Alps, racers traversed the entire country of Liechtenstein on a motorized bicycle, ending their trip at Gutenberg Castle.

- Episode 9: "We're Good American People" (April 24, 2011)
- Prize: A trip for two to Curaçao (awarded to Zev and Justin)
- Eliminated: Jet and Cord

Locations

- Salzburg (Aigen – Villa Trapp (in German))
- Salzburg → Feldkirch
- Schaanwald, Liechtenstein (Austria–Liechtenstein Border Crossing)
- Balzers (Gutenberg Castle)
- Balzers → Sargans, Switzerland
- Sargans → Zermatt (Zermatt Railway Station)
- Zermatt (Restaurant Walliserkanne Zermatt or Zermatt Railway Station)
- Zermatt (Hinterdorf – Inderbinen-Fountain)
- Zermatt (Bergrestaurant-Moos)

Episode summary

- At the start of this leg, teams were instructed to travel by train to Feldkirch, and then cross the border to Schaanwald, Liechtenstein, to find their next clue.
- For their Speed Bump, Gary and Mallory had to prepare the right mixture of gasoline and oil to power their VéloSoleX motorized bicycle for the Roadblock before they could continue racing.
- In this leg's Roadblock, one team member had to use an odometer to measure the entire length of Liechtenstein by riding from Schaanwald to Balzers on a VéloSoleX. At the Swiss border, they met six-time Winter Olympian Marco Büchel, where they gave him their distance written on the back of a postcard. If they were correct, Büchel directed them to Gutenberg Castle, where they could meet up with their teammate and read the next clue. If they were incorrect, they had to travel back to Schaanwald and start over.
- After the Roadblock, teams traveled by bus to Sargans, Switzerland, and then by train to Zermatt. Teams then found their next clue at the train station.
- This leg's Detour was a choice between Cheese or Wheeze. In Cheese, teams traveled to the Restaurant Walliserkanne Zermatt, where they had to finish an entire pot of cheese fondue to receive an empty fondue pot with the name of the next location printed on the inside. In Wheeze, teams had to dress as bellhops and then pick up pieces of luggage from the Zermatt railway station. They then had to deliver the suitcases using a luggage cart to different hotels throughout Zermatt where they received receipt tags for each piece of luggage. Once teams had a total of twenty tags from at least five different hotels, they could exchange them for their next clue.
- After the Detour, teams had to travel by foot to the Inderbinen-Fountain, where they found their next clue directing them to the Pit Stop: the Bergrestaurant-Moos.

Additional notes

- Flight Time and Big Easy chose to use the U-Turn on Jet and Cord.

=== Leg 10 (Switzerland) ===
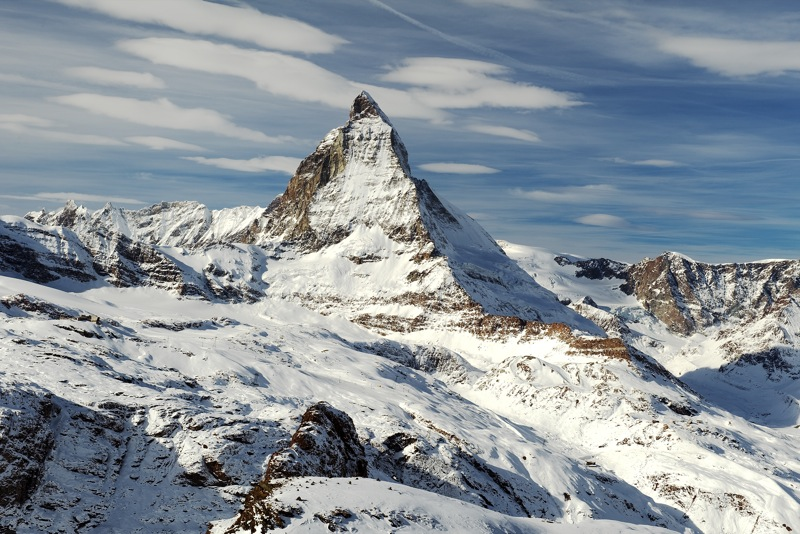
Teams traveled to the Matterhorn in the Swiss Alps where they participated in mountain rescue-themed Detour tasks.

- Episode 10: "Too Many Cooks in the Kitchen" (May 1, 2011)
- Prize: A trip for two to the Cook Islands (awarded to Flight Time and Big Easy)
- Eliminated: Kent and Vyxsin

Locations

- Zermatt (Bergrestaurant-Moos)
- Zermatt (Air Rescue Helicopter Port)
- Swiss Alps (Matterhorn Glacier)
- Swiss Alps (Matterhorn Glacier) → Riffelalp (Riffelalp Resort)
- Riffelalp → Zermatt
- Zermatt (Le Petit Cervin)
- Zermatt (Chalet Gädi – Swiss Cabin)

Episode summary

- At the start of this leg, teams had to travel to the Air Rescue helicopter port and sign up for a helicopter flight to their next location: the Matterhorn. Before they left on their flight, they received their next clue.
- This leg's Detour was a choice between two mountain rescue tasks: Search or Rescue. In Search, teams used a set of avalanche beacons to search the Matterhorn Glacier for a dummy buried in the snow. They then had to excavate the dummy before they could receive their next clue. In Rescue, teams had to use a special hoisting device to rescue a mountaineer trapped in a crevasse. One team member had to lower their teammate into the crevasse so they could attach a carabiner to the mountaineer. The teammate at the top had to raise their partner back to the surface and they then had to work together to bring up the rescued mountaineer, who gave them their next clue.
- After the Detour, teams had to take a helicopter to the Riffelalp ski resort and travel by train back down the mountain to Zermatt to find their next clue.
- In this leg's Roadblock, one team member had to make a Travelocity Roaming Gnome out of Swiss chocolate. First, they had to decorate a chocolate mold with colored chocolate. Once it was filled with chocolate, they had to bury it in the snow outside for 30 minutes for the chocolate to harden. Once the chocolatier approved their gnome, teams received a real gnome and their next clue, which directed them to the Pit Stop: the Swiss cabin at Chalet Gädi.

=== Leg 11 (Switzerland → Brazil) ===
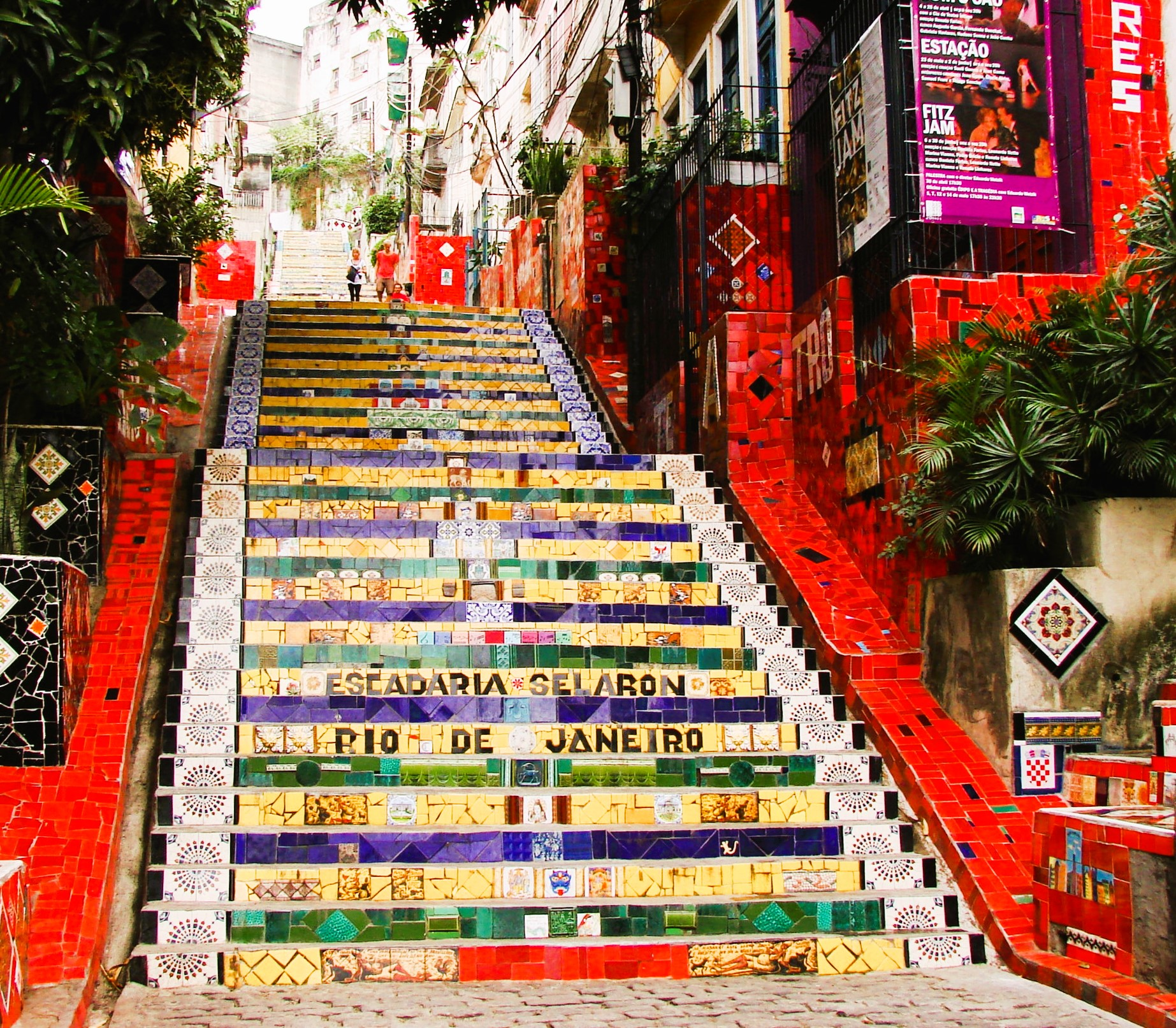
While visiting Rio de Janeiro, teams traveled to the famous Escadaria Selarón and searched the tile-covered steps for their next clue.

- Episode 11: "This is Where It Ends" (May 8, 2011)
- Prize: A cruise for two on the Mediterranean Sea with visits to Rome and Casablanca (awarded to Gary and Mallory)
- Eliminated: Zev and Justin

Locations

- Zermatt (Zermatt Railway Station)
- Zermatt → Zurich
- Zürich → Rio de Janeiro, Brazil
- Rio de Janeiro (Carioca Aqueduct)
- Rio de Janeiro (Escadaria Selarón)
- Rio de Janeiro (Largo de São Francisco de Paula)
- Rio de Janeiro (Centro de Orientação Profissional Salon)
- Rio de Janeiro (Leme Beach – Espaço OX or Copacabana Beach)
- Niterói (Praia de Boa Viagem)

Episode summary

- At the start of this leg, teams were instructed to travel by train to Zurich, and then fly to Rio de Janeiro, Brazil. Once there, teams had to take a tram to the top of the Carioca Aqueduct and then travel on foot to Escadaria Selarón. There, they had to search the tile-covered steps for a tile that had their next clue on the back.
- In this leg's Roadblock, one team member had to participate in a Rio Carnival parade. After donning costumes, they had to learn the samba and then lead a parade of dancers. If the Carnival Princess approved their dance, teams received their next clue; if not, they were sent back to relearn the dance and try again.
- After the Roadblock, teams had to find the Centro de Orientação Profissional Salon, where they had to undergo a Brazilian body waxing session for fifteen minutes before receiving their next clue.
- This season's final Detour was a choice between On the Rocks or On the Beach. In On the Rocks, teams traveled to the Espaço OX bar, where they had to make 100 satisfactory caipirinhas to receive their next clue. In On the Beach, teams had to pick up an umbrella loaded with bikinis and a mobile changing station and then sell the bikinis to people on Copacabana Beach. If teams had earned R$100 (roughly $60), they would have received their next clue. Although Zev and Justin tried selling the bikinis, they quickly grew frustrated by their lack of sales and switched to the caipirinhas.
- After the Detour, teams had to check in at the Pit Stop: the Praia de Boa Viagem, beneath the Niterói Contemporary Art Museum in Niterói.

=== Leg 12 (Brazil → United States) ===
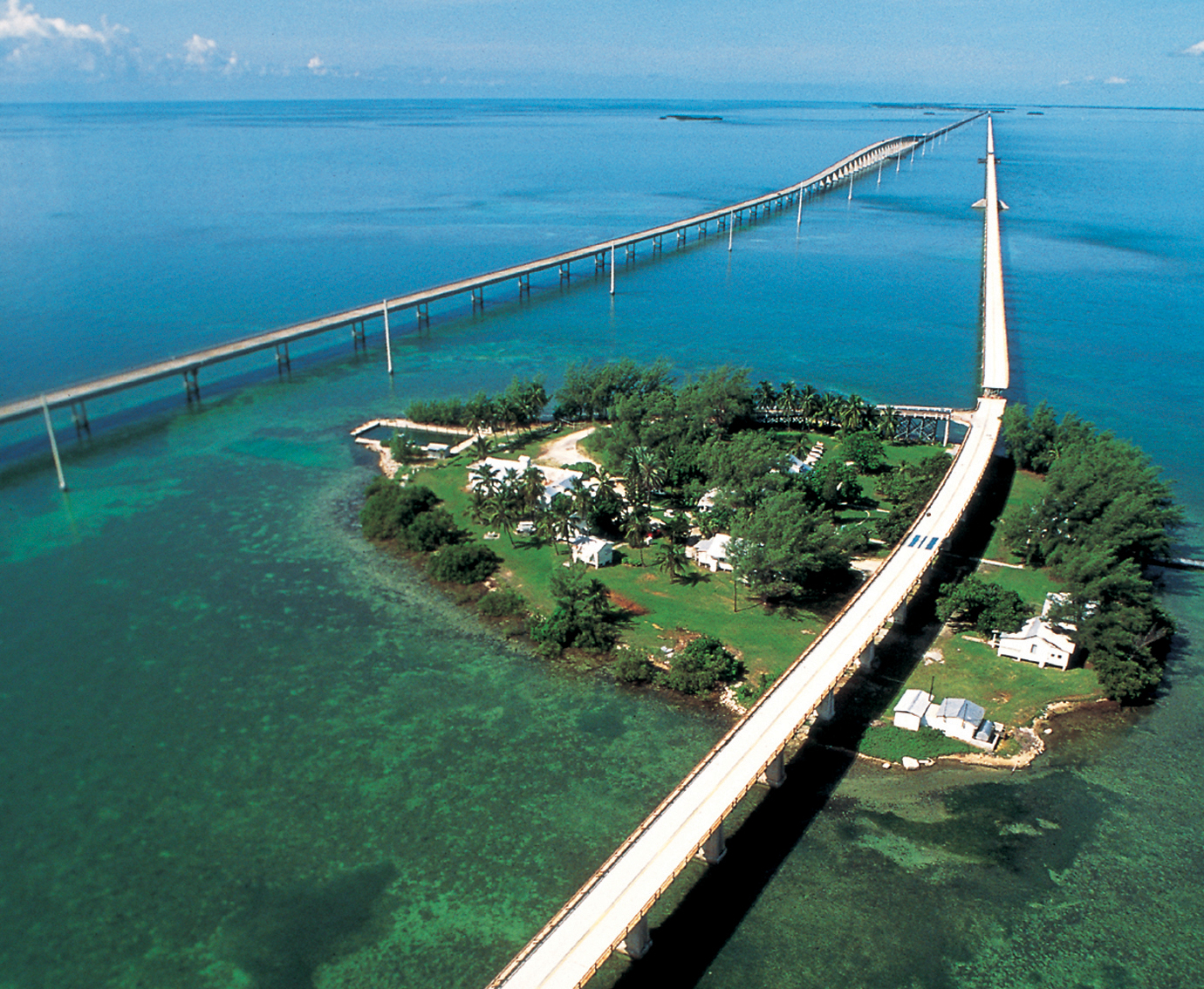
Pigeon Key Historic District, located in the middle of the Old Seven Mile Bridge in the Florida Keys, was the finish line of The Amazing Race: Unfinished Business.

- Episode 11: "This is Where It Ends" (May 8, 2011)
- Prize: US$1,000,000
- Winners: Kisha and Jen
- Runners-up: Flight Time and Big Easy
- Third place: Gary and Mallory

Locations

- Niterói (Praia de Boa Viagem)
- Rio de Janeiro → Miami, Florida
- Miami (Virginia Key – Rickenbacker Marina)
- Key Largo (Jules' Undersea Lodge)
- Big Pine Key (U.S. 1 Mile Marker 29 – Seacamp)
- Monroe County (Horseshoe Island)
- Big Pine Key → Marathon (Galway Bay Mobile Home Park)
- Marathon (Old Seven Mile Bridge) → Pigeon Key (Pigeon Key Historic District)

Episode summary

- At the start of this leg, teams were instructed to fly to Miami, Florida. Once there, teams had to travel to the Rickenbacker Marina, where they found their next clue.
- In this leg's first Roadblock, one team member had to operate a heavy load forklift and move a boat into drydock without dropping it to receive their next clue.
- After the first Roadblock, teams were directed to Jules' Undersea Lodge in Key Largo, where they found their next clue.
- In this season's final Roadblock, the team member who did not perform the previous Roadblock had to use a submersible to search the lagoon for one of several floating treasure chests that contained their next clue, while surrounded by mermaids, who were swimming around them and playing music.
- After the second Roadblock, teams were given a riddle instructing them to go to the sea camp near a mile marker on Big Pine Key by "subtract[ing] 4 from 33": Mile Marker 29. There, teams were instructed to walk across a shallow portion of the Gulf of Mexico to Horseshoe Island, where they found their next clue underneath the island's tallest tree. Teams were then instructed to walk back to Big Pine Key, where they took a speedboat to the Galway Bay Mobile Home Park in Marathon.
- At Galway Bay, teams had to set up a travel trailer as it appeared in a brochure to receive their final clue directing them to the Old Seven Mile Bridge, where they had to ride large tricycles along the bridge to the finish line at the Pigeon Key Historic District on Pigeon Key.

Additional note

- Legs 11 and 12 aired back-to-back as a special two-hour episode.

== Phil's Video Diary ==
A new feature to this season is an online show, allowing the viewers to see what happens behind the scenes of The Amazing Race, hosted by Keoghan. This feature replaced the "Elimination Station" videos as seen in previous seasons.

- Episode 1: The night before the first leg, Phil prepares to meet the eleven teams at Palm Springs, California. He then films the helicopter shots seen at the start of the episode. While traveling to Sydney, Phil explains that the flight had been delayed, meaning that the Pit Stop crew then only had a small time advantage over the teams. The final portion of the diary shows Phil filming the Pit Stop segment.
- Episode 2: Phil films the establishing shot for Shelly Beach and quickly cleans his hair outside, revealing he had not showered before the film crew left Los Angeles. As they drive to Oceanworld Manly to film the Roadblock's establishing shots, Phil sticks his head out of the car window to dry it. Later, Phil explains that they are now flying back to Sydney to catch a flight to Japan, and at the airport, he plays around on the baggage carousel, pretending to be a piece of luggage.
- Episode 3: Phil and the production crew arrive in Narita, Japan, and Phil explains why he loves to visit Japan. They head to the Yuhi Falls featured in the "Prayer of Purity" Detour task, enjoying the scenery, before explaining the task to his diary camera and then filming the piece for the show.
- Episode 4: The film crew lands in Lijiang, China, and Phil explains the Baishui River crossing tourist attraction before filming the explanation for the "Yak Yak Yak" task. After the group heads to the top of Jade Dragon Mountain, Phil shares some grilled yak with one of the film crew, before the filming of the Roadblock explanation in Spruce Meadow is shown.
- Episode 5: The film crew arrives in Kunming and Phil prepares to film the explanation of the "Embrace the Future" Detour task, before poking fun at Barry, the sound technician, and how he has lost his voice. Later, while on the way to the Stone Forest, Barry has his voice back, and they film the Roadblock segment using time-lapse photography. Phil then comments on how the competition has ramped up on Leg 5 and he is interested in who will come in first on the Leg.
- Episode 6: Phil and the production team arrive in Kolkata, and Phil remarks at how empty the streets are at 3 o'clock in the morning. By daybreak, the streets are full of cars and people, and Phil remarks on how he loves it when the show goes to India. Phil arrives in Jorasanko to explain the Detour tasks, and then they visit the Victoria Institution School for the end of the "Bengali Literature" Detour task. At the Pit Stop location, Phil plays cricket with several local children until he breaks the bat, and apologizes to them, before filming the establishing shot for the Pit Stop.
- Episode 7: In Varanasi, Phil remarks on how busy the city is in the morning, much like Kolkata. Phil walks down towards the Ganges, looking at the vegetable stalls on the way to the river. On the Ganges to film the Detour segments, Phil relaxes and says how he is enjoying traveling on the river. The film crew then heads to Ramnagar Fort to wait at the Pit Stop, where Phil once again enjoys watching the Ganges as the sun sets.
- Episode 8: Arriving in Vienna from Delhi, Phil remarks on how different the weather is from India, as it is winter in the northern hemisphere. Phil walks through one of Vienna's Christmas markets before heading to the Austrian National Library where he rides on a horse-drawn carriage before filming the Detour introduction where the Detour choices are initially named "Father of Psychoanalysis" and "Mother of All Meals", before changing to "Long Hard Walk" and "Quick and Easy Meal". The crew then heads to the Sigmund Freud Museum for the Freud's couch Detour before going to the Wiener Riesenrad for the eating Detour, where her eats a serving of Wienerschnitzel, while a microphone is up against the Schnitzel.
- Episode 9: The crew arrives in Zermatt, Switzerland, and Phil films the bus they rode and the surroundings. He then walks down the main street to the Detour tasks, commenting on how they only allow electric vehicles in the city. Later, Phil attempts to figure out how the VéloSoleX works, before he rides it in the Liechtenstein Roadblock explanation.
- Episode 10: Phil and the film crew leave their hotel early in the morning to head for the helicopter port that will take them onto the glaciers of the Matterhorn to film the Detour segment. They then take a gondola lift back down the mountain to Zermatt.
- Episode 11: Phil takes in the view of Rio de Janeiro's Copacabana Beach from his balcony, before heading to the beauty salon where a few crew members are being used to demonstrate the waxing route marker. Later, they head to the Niterói Contemporary Art Museum to prepare for the Pit Stop and film the portion explaining the museum before the next leg begins.

== Reception ==
=== Critical response ===
The Amazing Race 18 received mixed reviews. Scott Von Doviak of The A.V. Club wrote that by the end of the season, it was "finishing (mostly) strong after so many lackluster weeks along the way." Daniel Fienberg of HitFix wrote that "this 'Amazing Race' season was almost conspicuously designed to prevent memorable moments." Luke Dwyer of TV Fanatic wrote that "the start of The Amazing Race: Unfinished Business was chock full of dynamic challenges, interesting legs and surprises. As the number of teams got whittled down, the legs became less creative." Michael Hewitt of the Orange County Register wrote that "the show still has much to recommend it: spectacular locations, engrossing human drama and brilliant editing. But it needs to be a race once again." Patrick Hodges of CinemaBlend wrote that it was "all in all, a very good season. Lots of great locations, lots of sportsmanship, very few assclownish moments." Daron Aldridge of Box Office Prophets called it another entertaining season. In 2016, this season was ranked 13th out of the first 27 seasons by the Rob Has a Podcast Amazing Race correspondents. Kareem Gantt of Screen Rant wrote that this "the legs are fantastically planned and executed, the suspense was high, and viewers even got some emotional eliminations that made for great TV." In 2021, Jane Andrews of Gossip Cop ranked this season as the show's 7th best season. In 2022, Rhenn Taguiam of Game Rant ranked this season as the sixth-best season. In 2024, Taguiam's ranking was updated with this season becoming the eighth-best season.

=== Ratings ===
U.S. Nielsen ratings

#	Airdate	Episode	Rating	Share	Rating/Share	Viewers	Rank	Rank	Rank	Rank
#	Airdate	Episode	Households		18–49	(millions)	Timeslot (Viewers)	Timeslot (18–49)	Week (Viewers)	Week (18–49)
1	February 20, 2011	"Head Down and Hold On"	5.1	8	2.5/7	9.15	#2	#1 (tied)	#30	(<#25)
2	February 27, 2011	"I Never Looked So Foolish in My Whole Entire Life"	4.3	7	2.1/5	7.68	#2	#3	(<#30)	(<#25)
3	March 6, 2011	"We Had a Lot of Evil Spirits Apparently"	5.5	9	2.7/7	9.78	#2	#2	#22	#23
4	March 13, 2011	"This is the Most Stupid Day Ever"	5.3	9	2.7/8	9.44	#2	#2	#21	#17
5	March 20, 2011	"Don't Ruin the Basketball Game"	5.7	9	2.8/8	10.13	#1	#1 (tied)	#13	#18
6	March 27, 2011	"I Feel Like a Monkey in a Circus Parade"	6.2	10	3.2/9	10.96	#1	#1	#12	#14
7	April 10, 2011	"You Don't Get Paid Unless You Win"	6.0	9	2.9/8	10.48	#1	#1	#21	#18
8	April 17, 2011	"I Cannot Deal With Your Psycho Behavior"	5.1	8	2.4/7	8.78	#1	#1	#22	(<#25)
9	April 24, 2011	"We're Good American People"	5.3	9	2.6/8	9.37	#1	#1	#17	#15
10	May 1, 2011	"Too Many Cooks in the Kitchen"	5.3	8	2.6/7	9.20	—N/a	—N/a	#20	#18
11	May 8, 2011	"This is Where It Ends"	5.0	8	2.5/7	8.97	#2	#1	(<#25)	#24

Canadian ratings

#	Airdate	Episode	Viewers (millions)	Rank (Week)
1	February 20, 2011	"Head Down and Hold On"	2.66	#4
2	February 27, 2011	"I Never Looked So Foolish in My Whole Entire Life"	1.62	#20
3	March 6, 2011	"We Had a Lot of Evil Spirits Apparently"	2.79	#1
4	March 13, 2011	"This is the Most Stupid Day Ever"	2.53	#3
5	March 20, 2011	"Don't Ruin the Basketball Game"	2.44	#3
6	March 27, 2011	"I Feel Like a Monkey in a Circus Parade"	1.81	#12
7	April 10, 2011	"You Don't Get Paid Unless You Win"	2.44	#5
8	April 17, 2011	"I Cannot Deal With Your Psycho Behavior"	2.57	#1
9	April 24, 2011	"We're Good American People"	2.33	#5
10	May 1, 2011	"Too Many Cooks in the Kitchen"	2.74	#3
11	May 8, 2011	"This is Where It Ends"	2.70	#2

== Works cited ==
- Castro, Adam-Troy (2006). My Ox Is Broken!. BenBella Books. ISBN 978-1-932100-91-4.
