= Yuhi =

Yuhi may refer to:

== People ==
=== Japan ===
- Yuhi Nakaya (中谷 雄飛; born 1999), Japanese long-distance runner
- Yuhi Sano (born 1965), Japanese professional wrestler
- Yuhi Sekiguchi (born 1987), Japanese racing driver
- Yuhi (wrestler) (born 1995), Japanese professional wrestler
- Yuhi “Hyui” Komori (NEXZ) (born 2007), Japanese K-pop idol

=== Rwanda ===
- Yuhi I of Rwanda
- Yuhi II of Rwanda
- Yuhi III of Rwanda
- Yuhi V of Rwanda

== Fictional characters ==
- Kurenai Yuhi

== Locations ==
- Yuhi Falls
