= Wangu Pavilion =

Wooden pavilion in China

Coordinates: 26°52′25.86″N 100°13′48.58″E

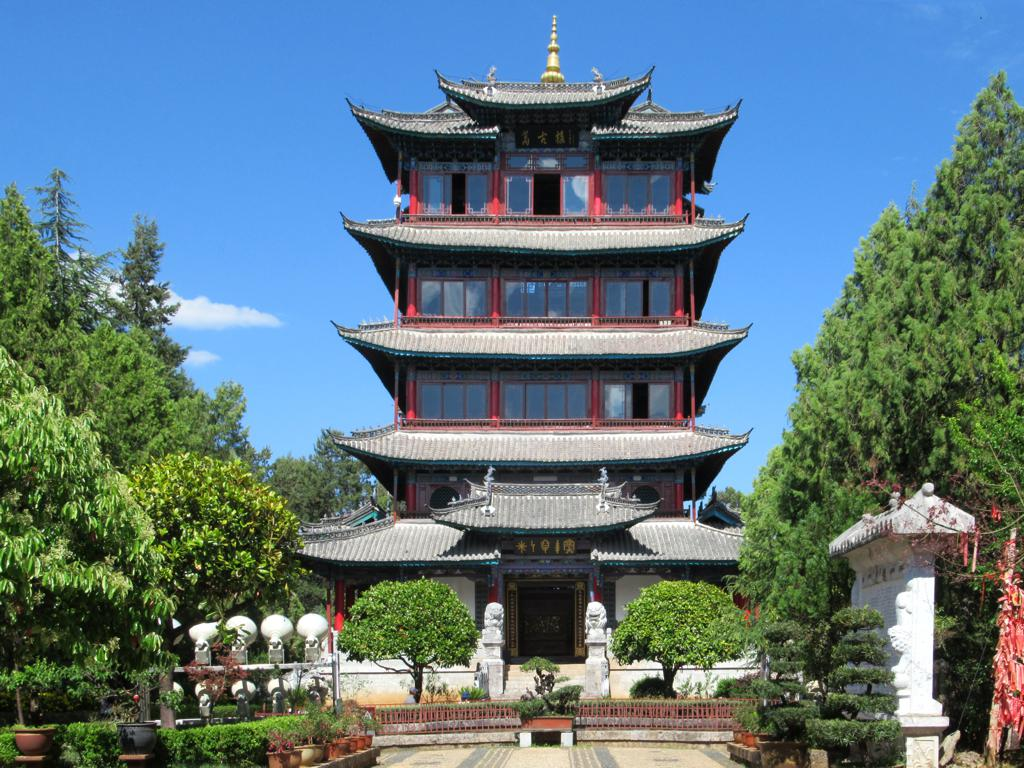
Wangu Pavilion

Wangu Pavilion is located on Lion Hill, within the Old Town of Lijiang district, Yunnan, China. The wooden pavilion was reconstructed in 1997 as part of the Lijiang areas' declaration as a UNESCO World Heritage Site. Wangu Pavilion means 'the pavilion of everlasting clarity'.

== History ==
Within the Yunnan provence, the original prefecture of Lijiang Junmin developed under the Ming rule of the region in 1382. The region is mountainous with many rivers, so the town was built on a mountain slope facing a river. Timber homes and domestic buildings of the Naxi minority culture have remained, demonstrating the evolution of architectural styles and building methods over dynastic periods. Han and Qing dynasty architectural features are also dominant. This includes the timber structure with elaborate arches and roof beams, exterior verandahs, tiled roofs and ornamentation of the building. Decoration was not limited to final colourful painting. Carved wood reflected the cultural influences of local flora, native and mythological animals typically Phoenix and Dragons.

== Features ==
Wangu Pavilion sits in park land on Lion Hill. The pavilion is constructed on 16 columns each of 22 metres in height. There are four pairs of stone lions at the four sides of the pavilion and stone stairs leading to its main entrance. The pavilion's five storeys are accessed by an interior stairway that opens out on each floor and leads to the top level from which many features of the Li Valley can be viewed, including the Lijiang Old Town and Jade Dragon Snow Mountain.

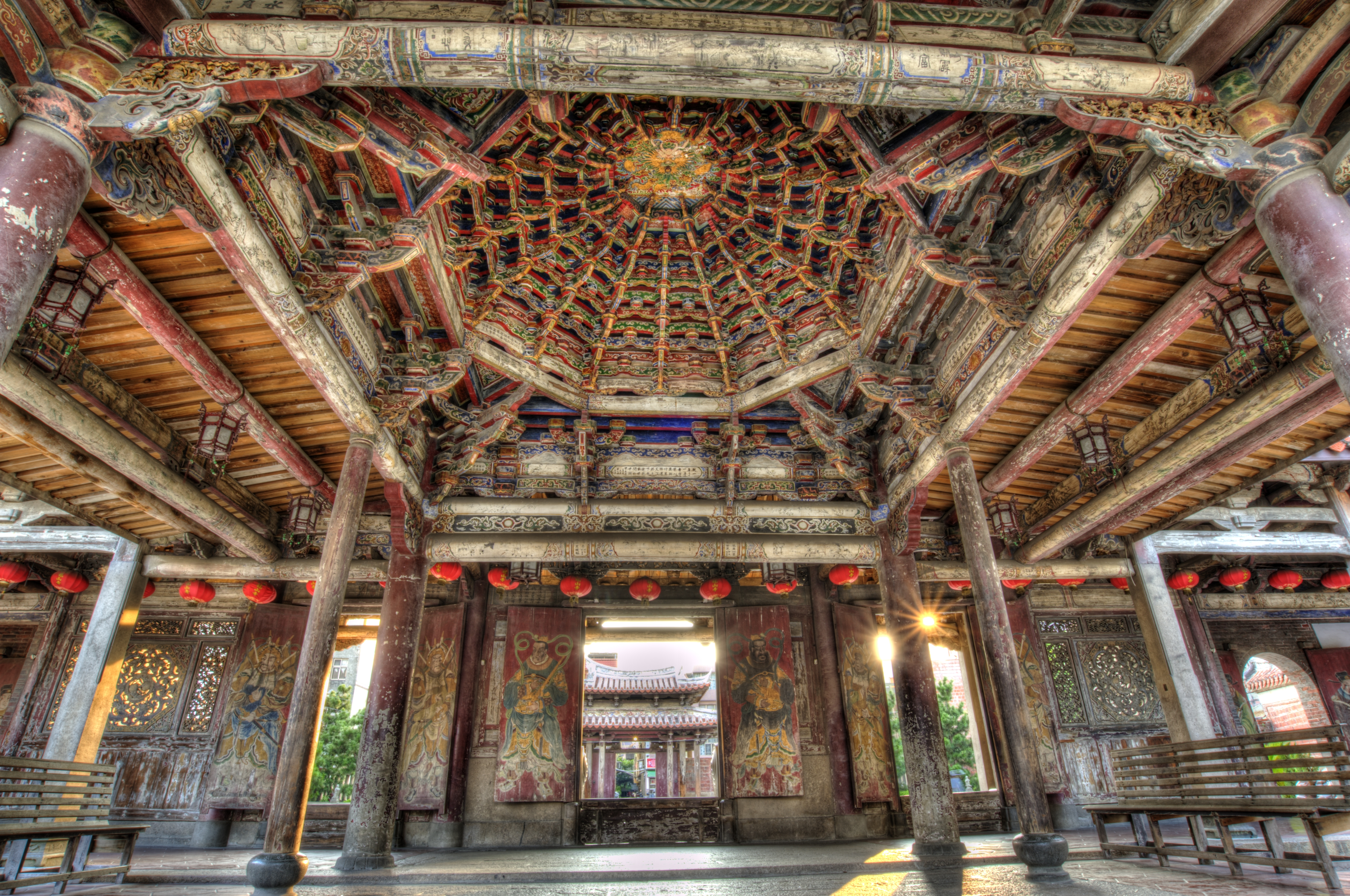
Asian wooden caisson style ceiling

The pavilion is decorated with 2,300 auspicious patterns, representing 23 ethnic groups living in Lijiang. As an art form, 9,999 dragon patterns are sculptured on the wall of the pavilion. To add one more dragon at the caisson ceiling to reach 10,000, would give the meaning of 10,000, pronounced in Chinese as “wan”, ever-lasting or eternal prosperity.

=== Unesco listing ===
While the Lijiang area is a UNESCO World Heritage Site, traditional architectural craftsmanship a s seen in the area, has placed Wooden framed structures onto the Intangible Cultural Heritage List. This includes the timber structure with elaborate arches and roof beams, exterior verandahs, tiled roofs and ornamentation of the building. Decoration was not limited to final colourful painting. Carved wood reflected the cultural influences of local flora, native and mythological animals typically Phoenix and Dragons.
