= Baishui River =

River in Yunnan province of China

Coordinates: 27°09′38″N 100°26′42″E

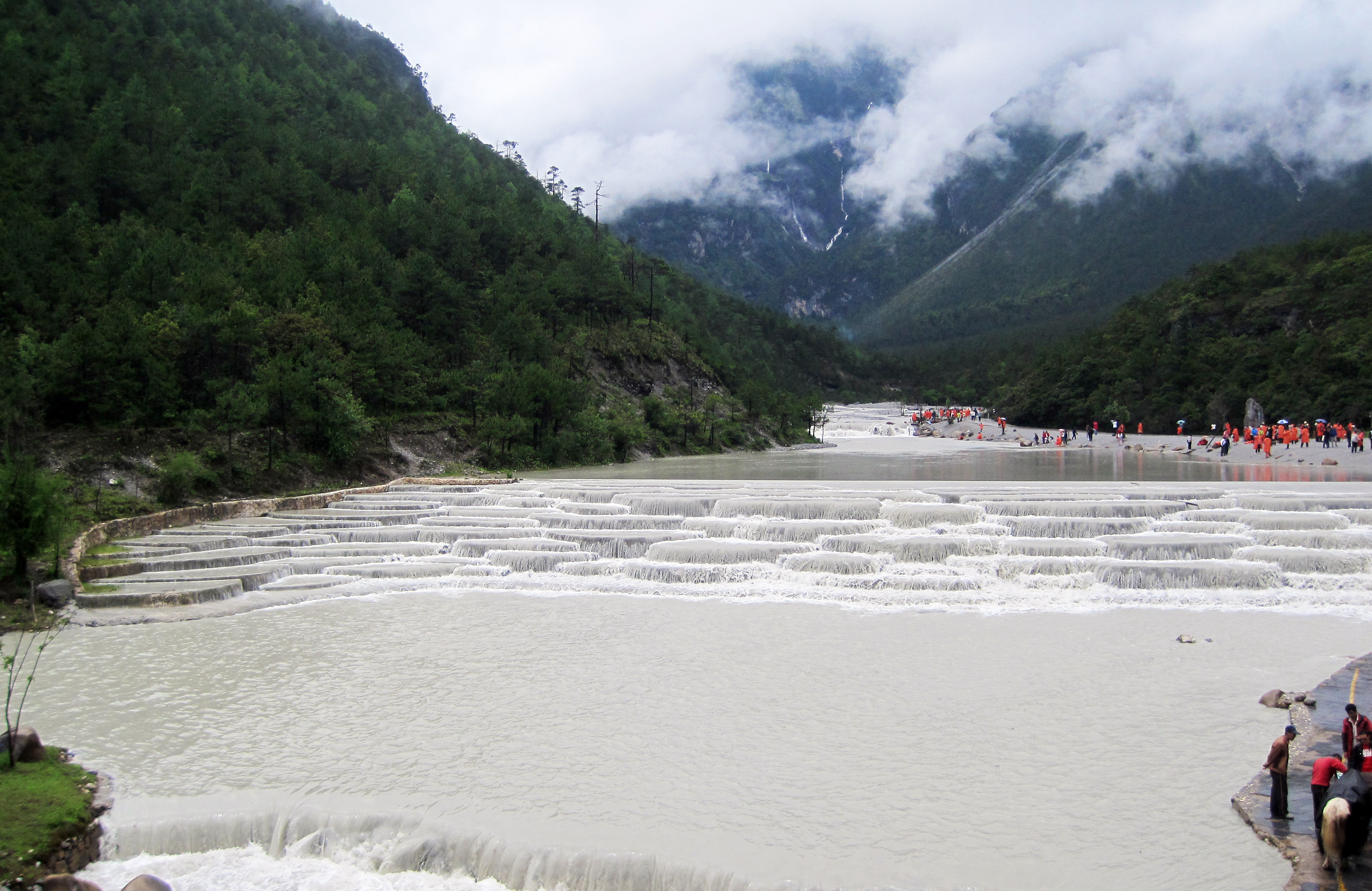
The Baishui River, in the Jade Dragon Snow Mountains, Yunnan province, China.

The Baishui River (Chinese: 白水河; pinyin: Báishuǐ hé; lit. 'White Water River') is a short tributary of the Yangtze River in Yunnan Province, China. The river has its source on the eastern flanks of Jade Dragon Snow Mountain in Lijiang prefecture-level city. The river flows towards the east for approximately 25 km (16 mi) before joining the Yangtze.

== See also ==
- Three Parallel Rivers of Yunnan Protected Areas
- List of rivers in China
