= Manly Sea Life Sanctuary =

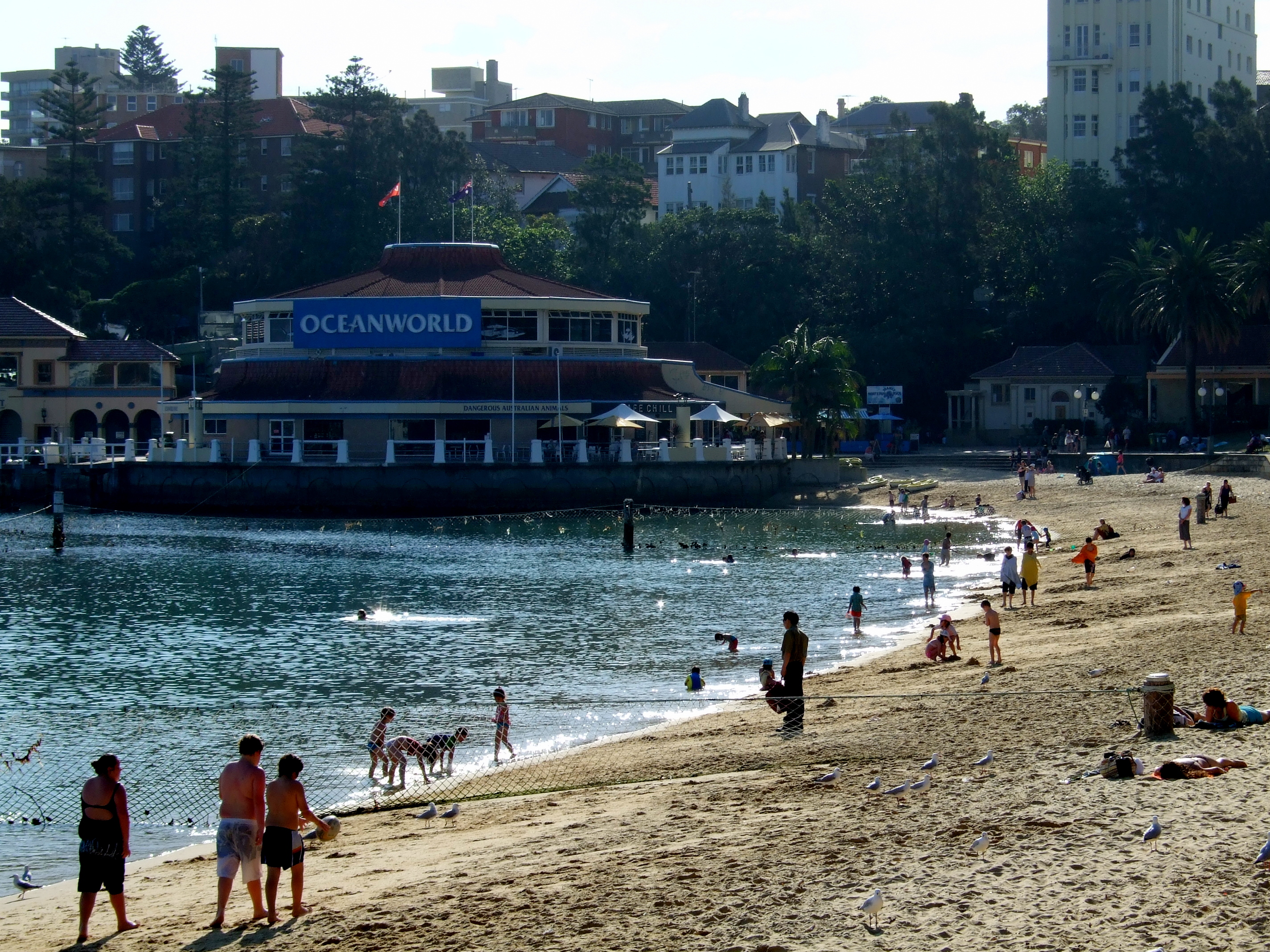
- An overview of Manly Sea Life Sanctuary when it was known as Oceanworld Manly
- Interactive map of Manly Sea Life Sanctuary
- 33.7991°S 151.2813°E
- Date opened: 1965
- Date closed: 28 January 2018
- Location: Manly, Sydney, Australia
- Volume of largest tank: 4,000,000 L (880,000 imp gal; 1,100,000 US gal)
- Owner: Merlin Entertainments
- Website: www.manlysealifesanctuary.com.au

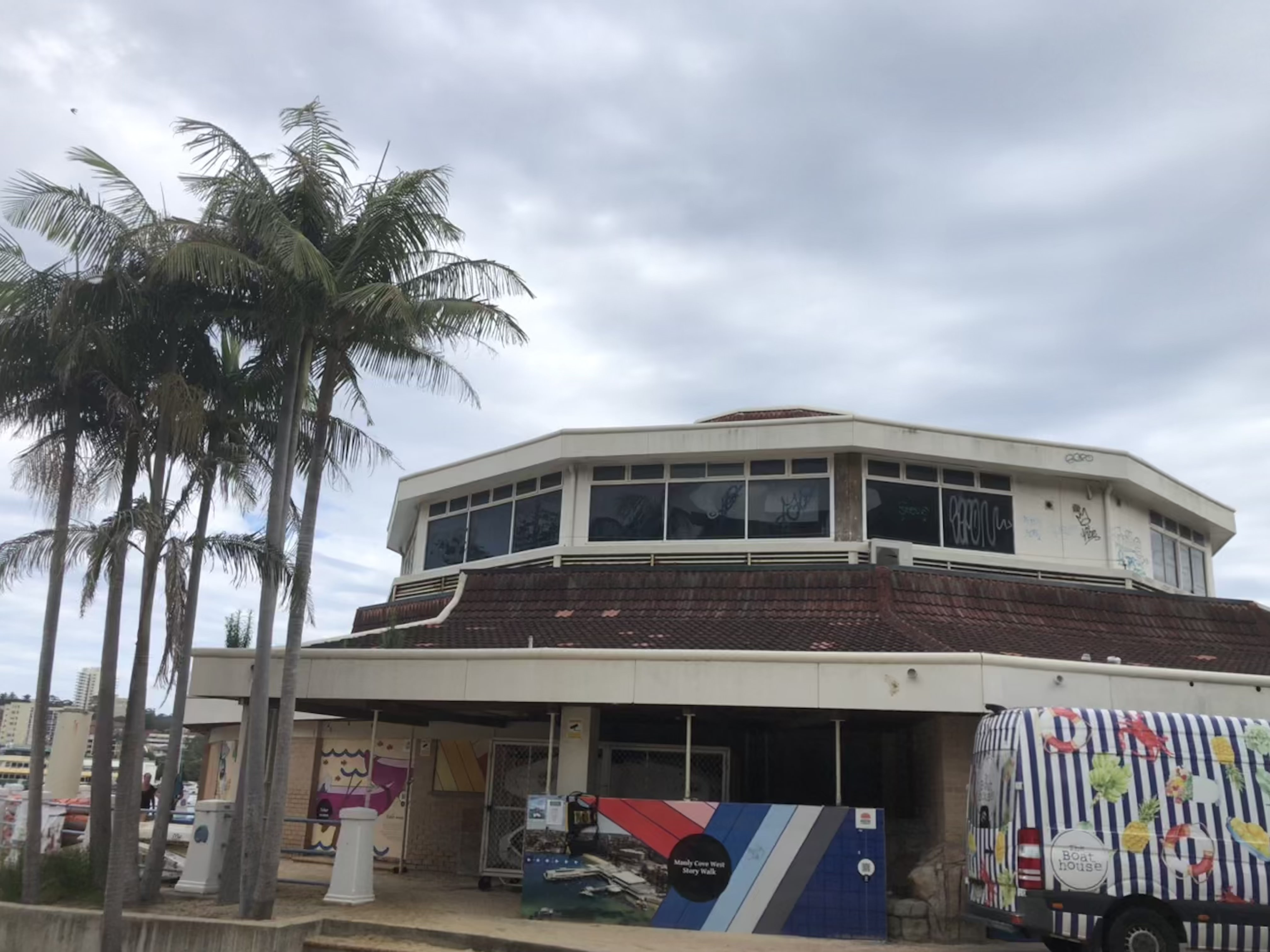
Manly Sea Life Sanctuary Exterior

Manly Sea Life Sanctuary (formerly Oceanworld Manly) was a public aquarium located in Manly, Sydney, Australia. It featured sharks, giant stingrays, sea turtles, little penguins and other marine life. It also allowed guests to take part in Shark Dive Xtreme, where they could swim with grey nurse sharks over three metres long.

== History ==
The sanctuary originally opened in 1965, as Marineland. It was refurbished and reopened in 1989 as Underwater World. It was purchased and renovated by Coral World International, and re-opened as Oceanworld in 1992. After its renovation, the aquarium boasted the longest aquarium tunnel in the world, at 110 metres (361 ft). The aquarium was sold to the Sydney Aquarium Company (later Sydney Attractions Group) in 1999 to be operated, as a branch of the Sydney Aquarium. In February 2008, Village Roadshow Theme Parks acquired the Sydney Attractions Group. In December 2010, Merlin Entertainments acquired the Sydney Attractions Group division of Village Roadshow Theme Parks. On 28 June 2012, the attraction officially relaunched as Manly Sea Life Sanctuary following a renovation which saw the addition of the Penguin Cove exhibit. It closed on 28 January 2018 due to projected maintenance costs.

In December 2023, the council announced that the old aquarium would be demolished to make way for the upgrade of Manly Cove West. The demolition commenced in July 2024.
