= Yuhi Falls =

Yūhi Falls
- 夕日の滝
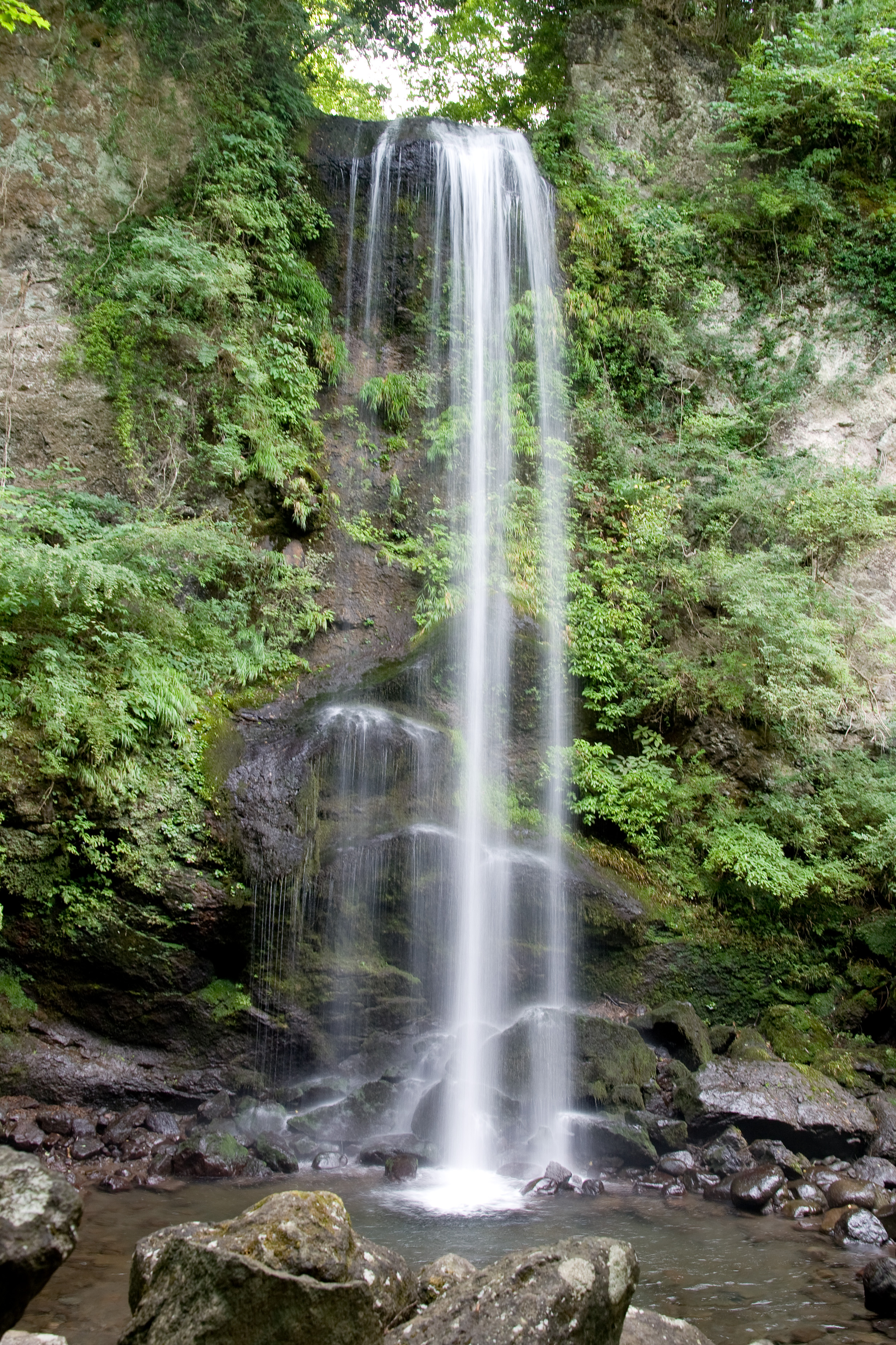

- Location within Japan
- Location: Minamiashigara, Kanagawa, Japan
- Coordinates: 35°18′37.1″N 139°01′32.1″E
- Total height: 23 m (75 ft)
- Average width: 5 m (16 ft)

Yūhi Falls (夕日の滝, Yūhi-no-taki) is a waterfall on the upper reaches of Kari river, in western Minamiashigara, Kanagawa, Japan.

Yūhi can be translated as "sunset", and is so named because of its beauty in the setting sun.
