= The Amazing Race 24 =

Season of television series

- Season 24
- Region 1 DVD cover
- Presented by: Phil Keoghan
- No. of teams: 11
- Winners: Dave & Connor O'Leary
- No. of legs: 12
- Distance traveled: 23,000 mi (37,000 km)
- No. of episodes: 12

Release
- Original network: CBS
- Original release: February 23 – May 18, 2014

Additional information
- Filming dates: November 16 – December 6, 2013

Series chronology
- ← Previous; Season 23 Next → Season 25

The Amazing Race 24 (also known as The Amazing Race: All-Stars) is the twenty-fourth season of the American reality competition show The Amazing Race. Hosted by Phil Keoghan, it featured eleven teams of two, ten teams returning from previous editions and a composite team with two members that competed on separate seasons, competing in a race around the world to win US$1,000,000. This season visited three continents and nine countries and traveled over 23,000 miles (37,000 km) during twelve legs. Starting in Santa Clarita, California, racers traveled through China, Malaysia, Sri Lanka, Italy, Switzerland, Spain, England, and Wales before returning to the United States and finishing in Las Vegas. Elements of the show that returned for this season include the starting line task. The season premiered on CBS on February 23, 2014, and concluded on May 18, 2014.

Father and son Dave and Connor O'Leary from The Amazing Race 22 were the winners of this season, while country singers Caroline Cutbirth and Jennifer Wayne from The Amazing Race 22 finished in second place, and Big Brother newlyweds Brendon Villegas and Rachel Reilly from The Amazing Race 20 finished in third place.

== Production ==
=== Development and filming ===
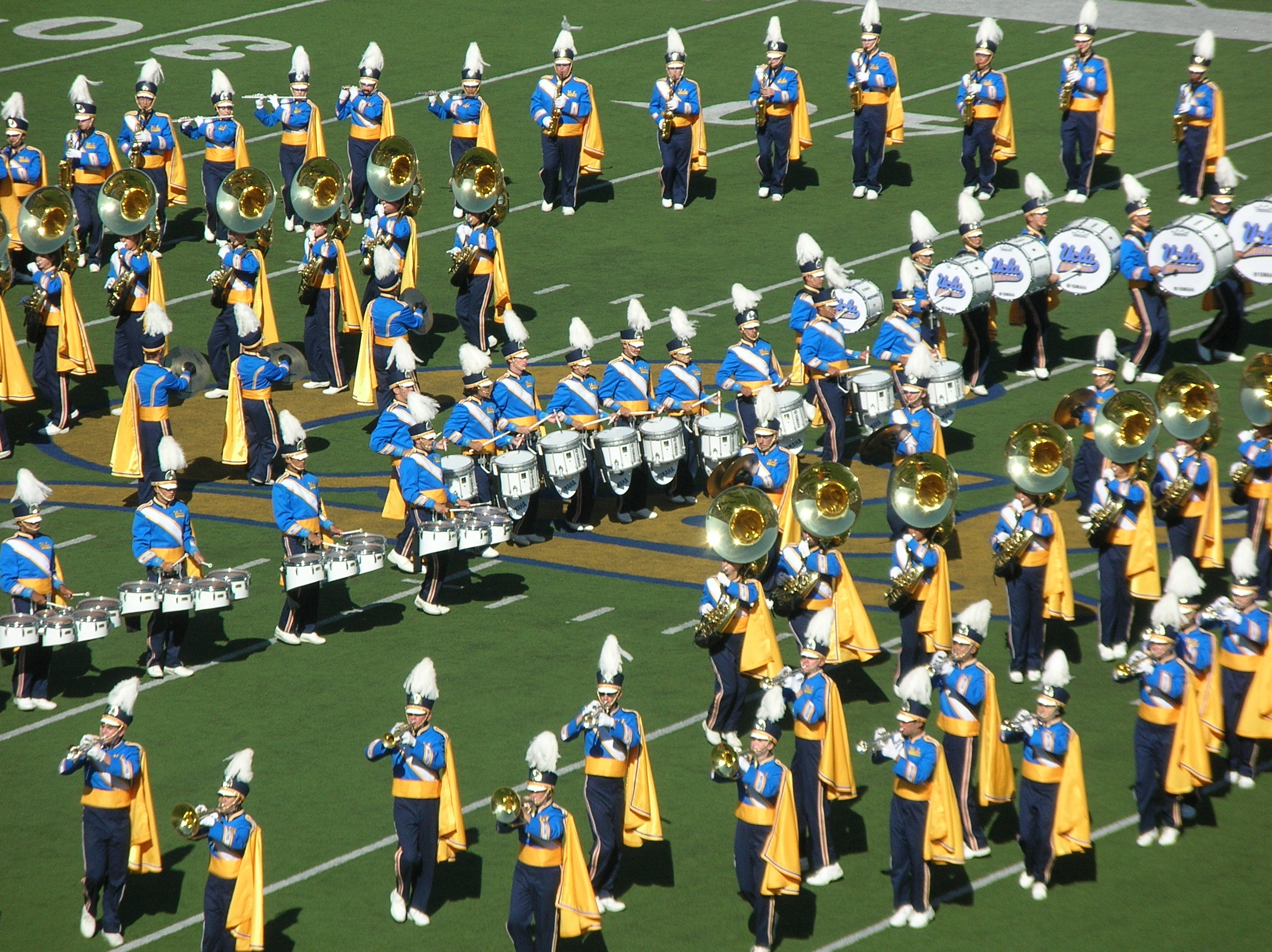
The UCLA Bruin Marching Band performed at the starting line for this "All-Stars" edition of The Amazing Race.

Filming for the season began on November 16, 2013, at Cougar Stadium at the College of the Canyons in Santa Clarita, California, with the returning teams spotted at Los Angeles International Airport later in the day. Filming was initially set to begin at the Rose Bowl, but was changed to Cougar Stadium due to "issues of availability to use the Rose Bowl." This season's course traveled 23,000 miles (37,000 km), across three continents and nine countries, including a first-time visit to Wales.

Illusionist David Copperfield appeared in the first Roadblock during the finale in Las Vegas.

=== Casting ===
In casting the teams for this season, host Phil Keoghan said that they sought to bring back teams that fans love as well as teams that spark the biggest fan reactions. One month prior to the start of filming, while the casting process was still ongoing, seven out of the 11 teams that appeared on this season were leaked through Twitter. Returning teams were ultimately selected from previous teams going as far back as season 14, including three teams competing for a third time.

- Amani & Marcus from season 19 were contacted, but declined the invitation due to work commitments.
- Art & J.J. from season 20 were originally selected, but were cut a few days before filming. They would later participate in season 31.
- Tim & Marie from season 23 were originally selected, but declined the invitation.

== Contestants ==
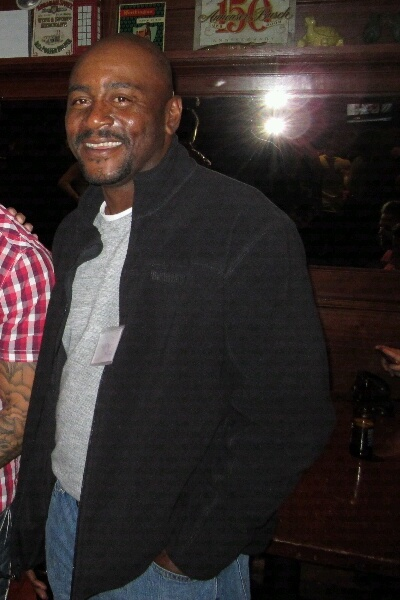
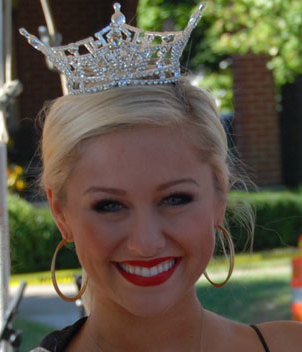
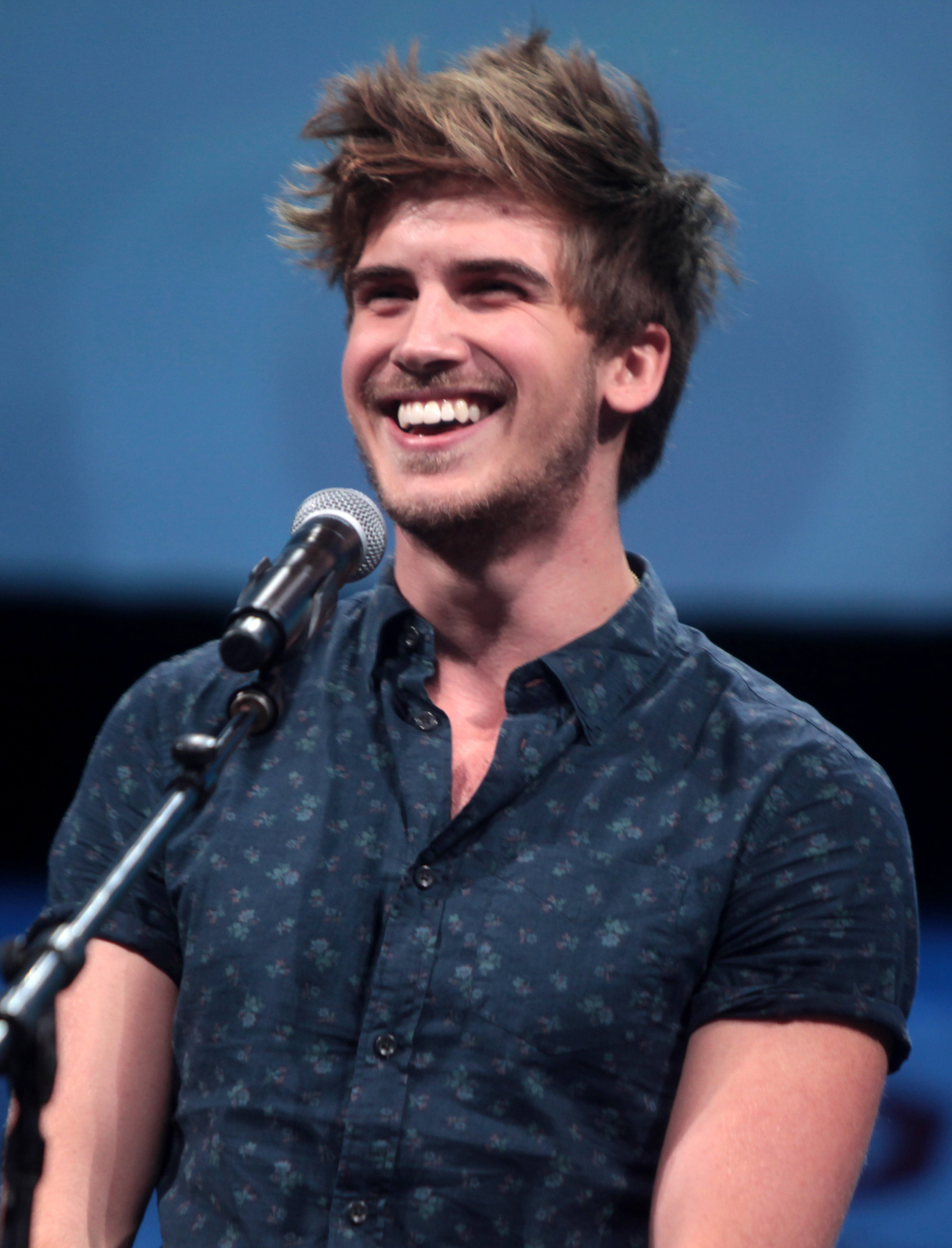
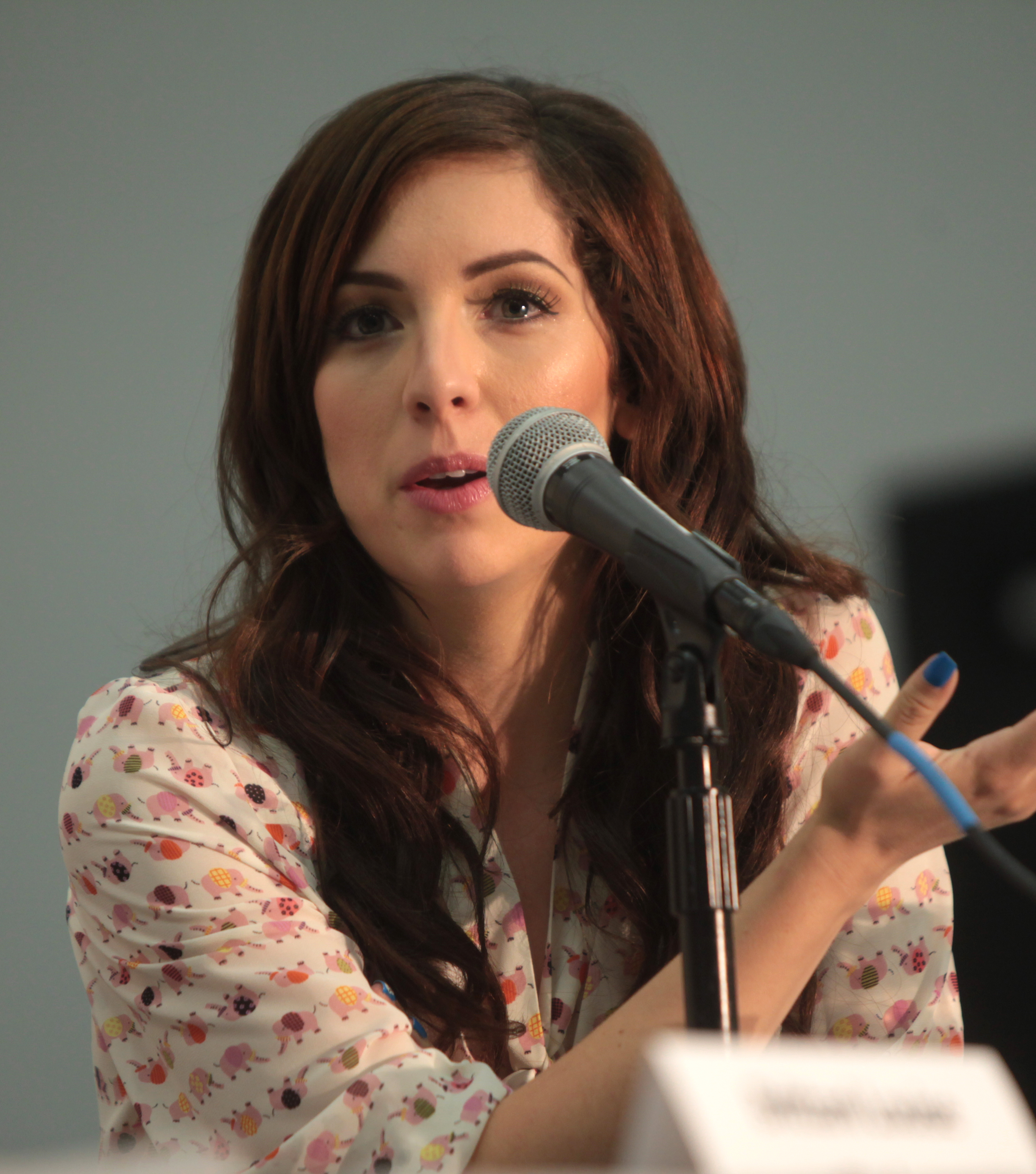
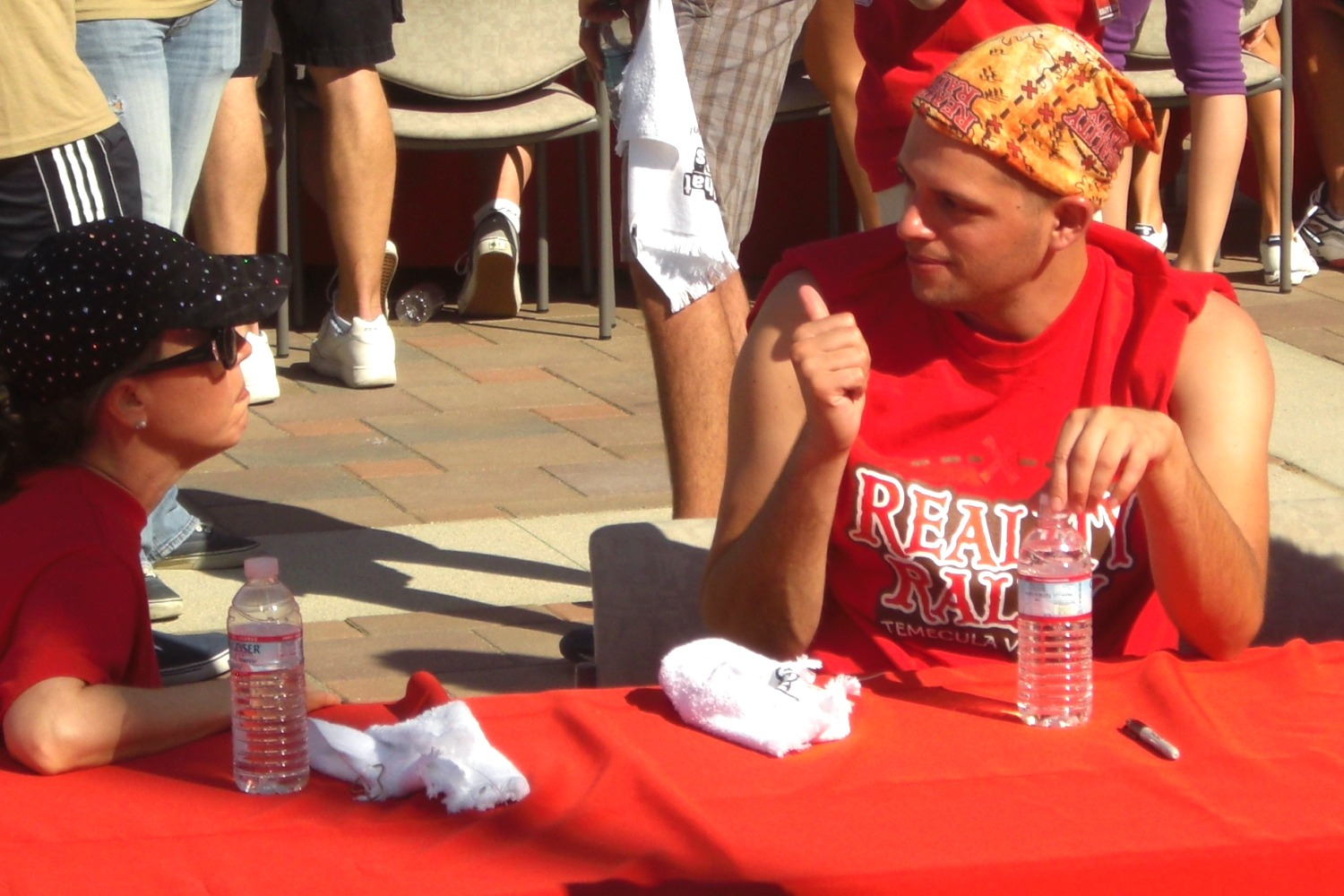
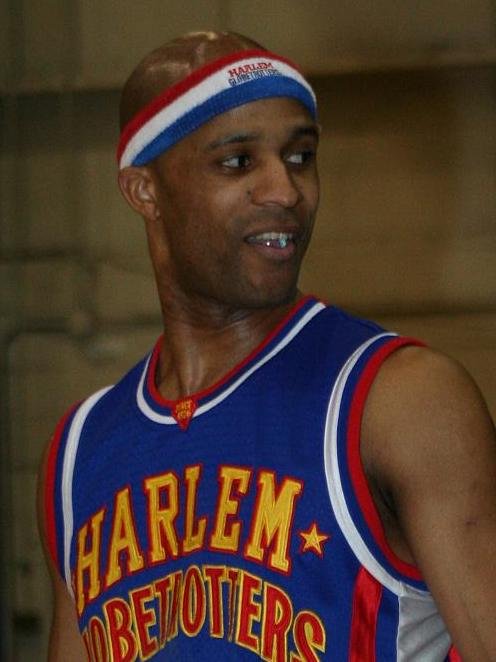
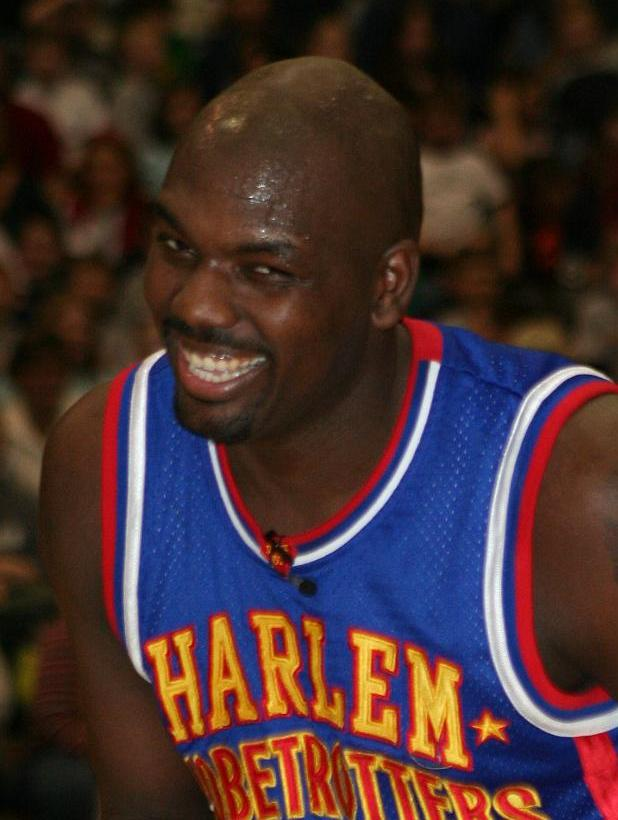
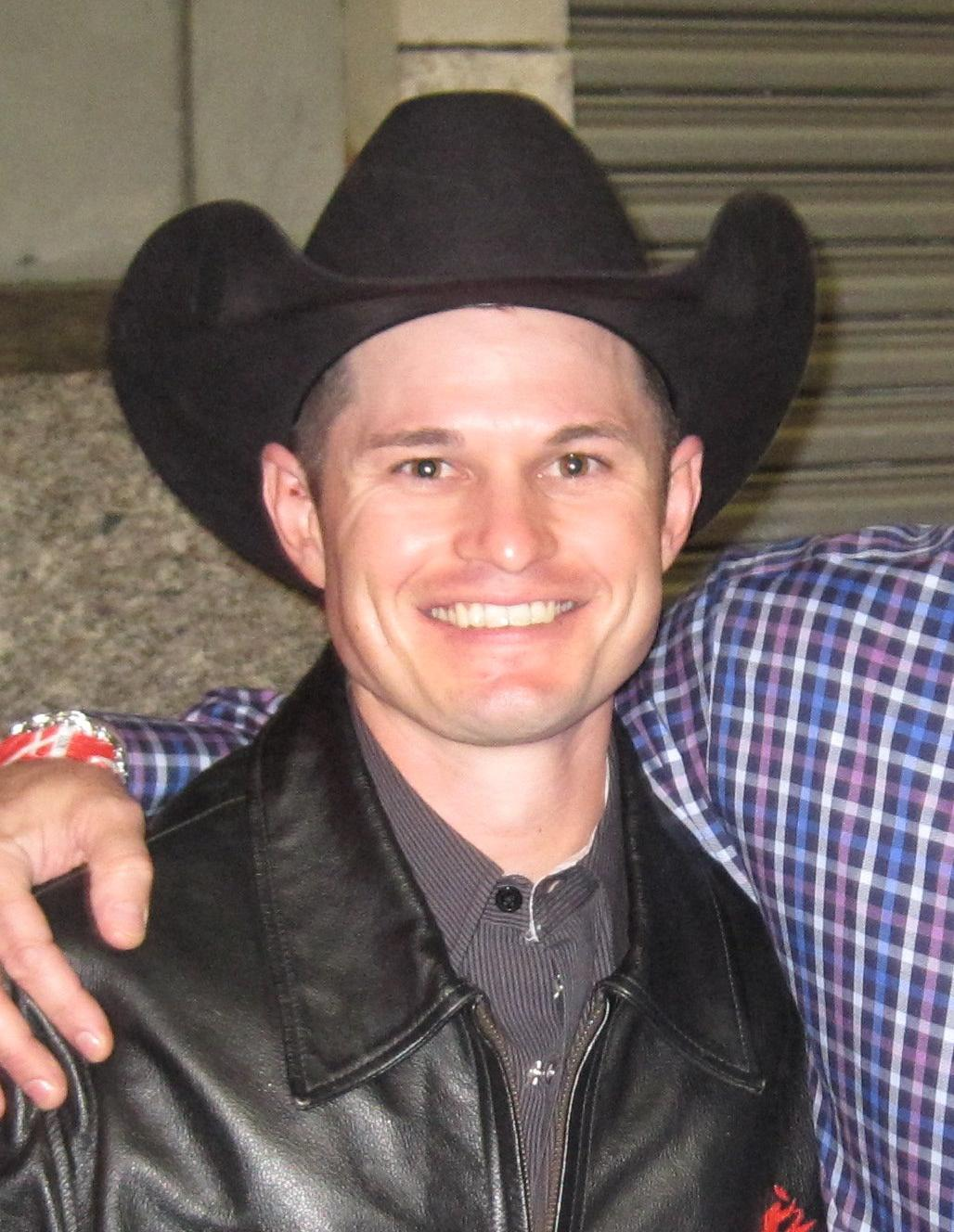
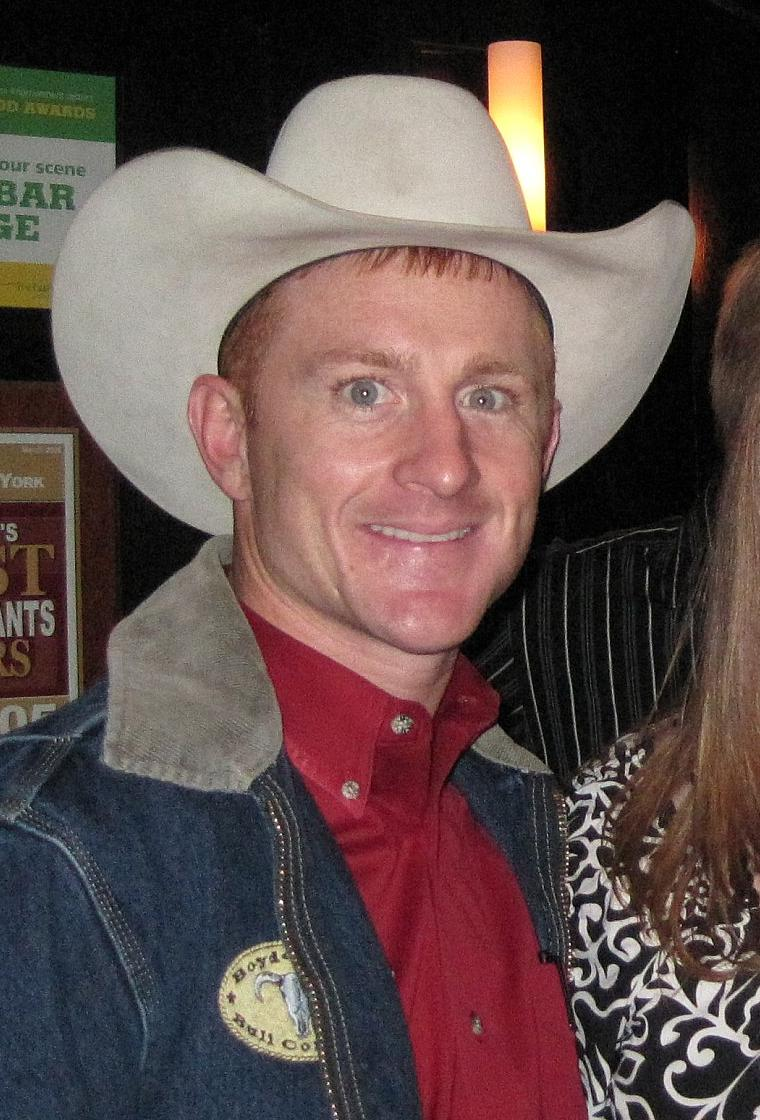
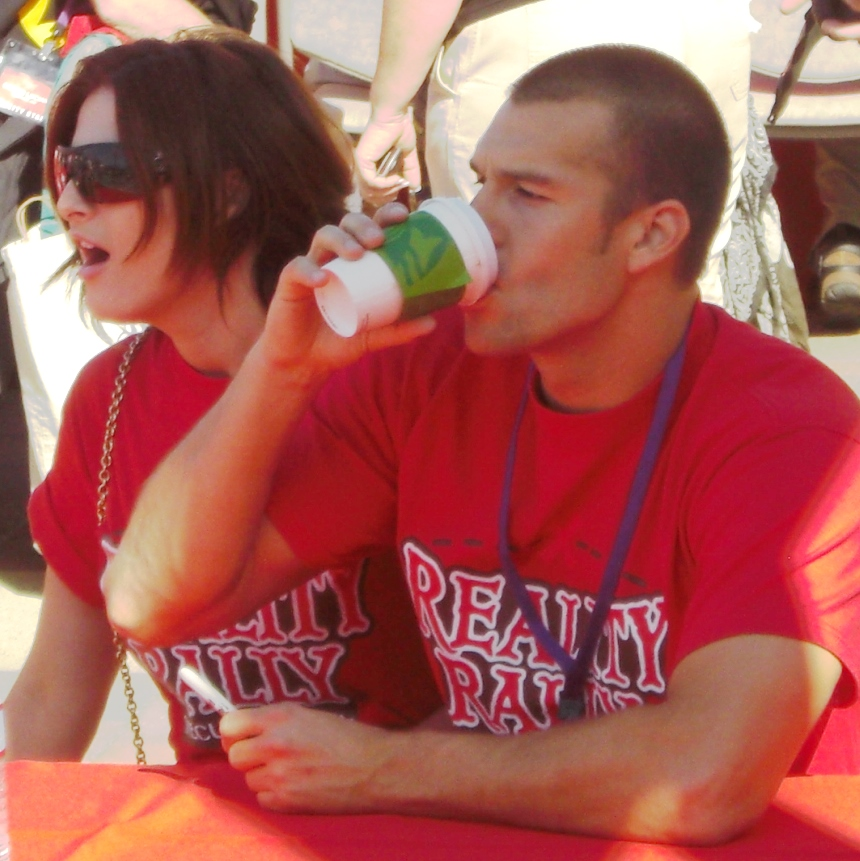
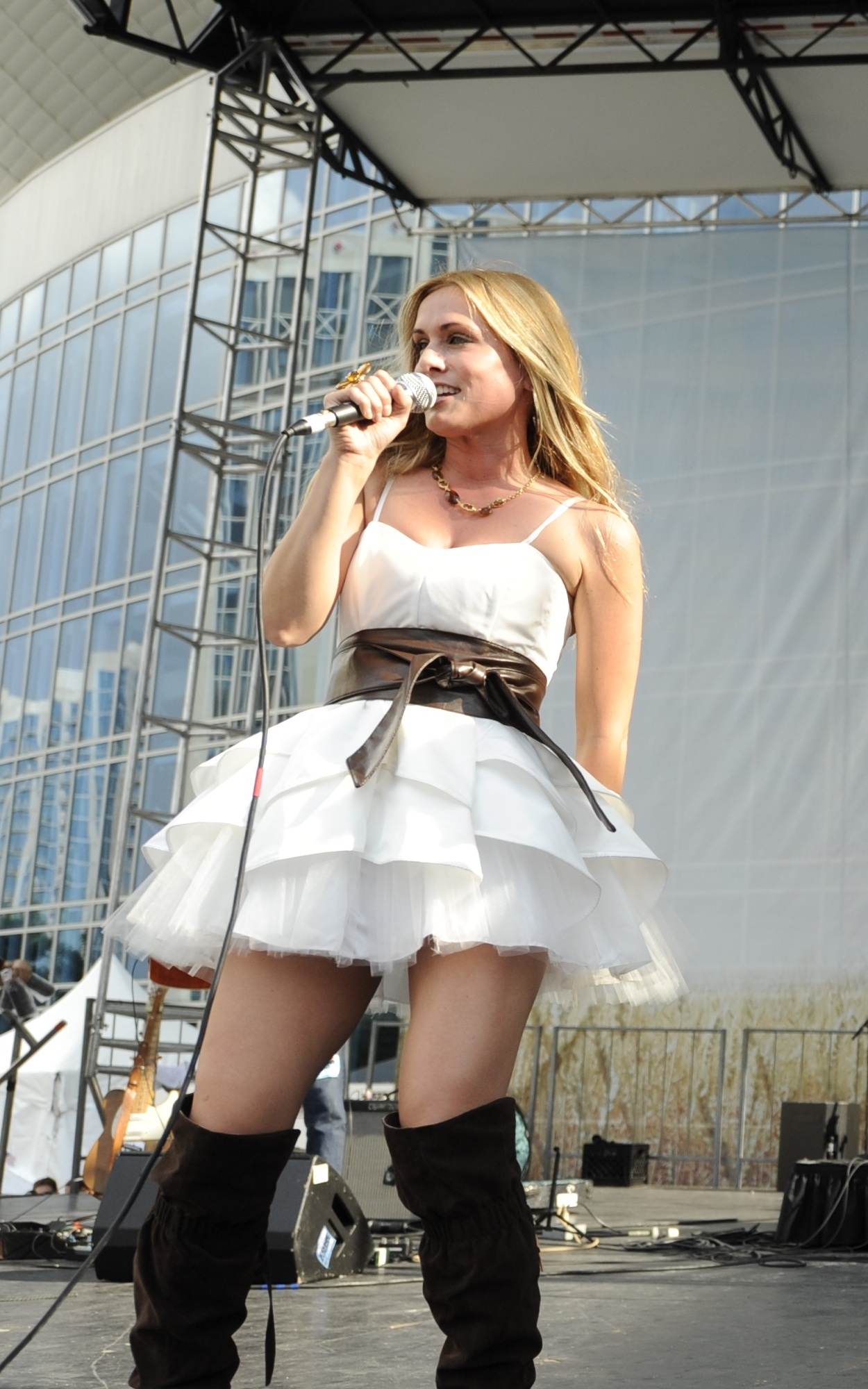
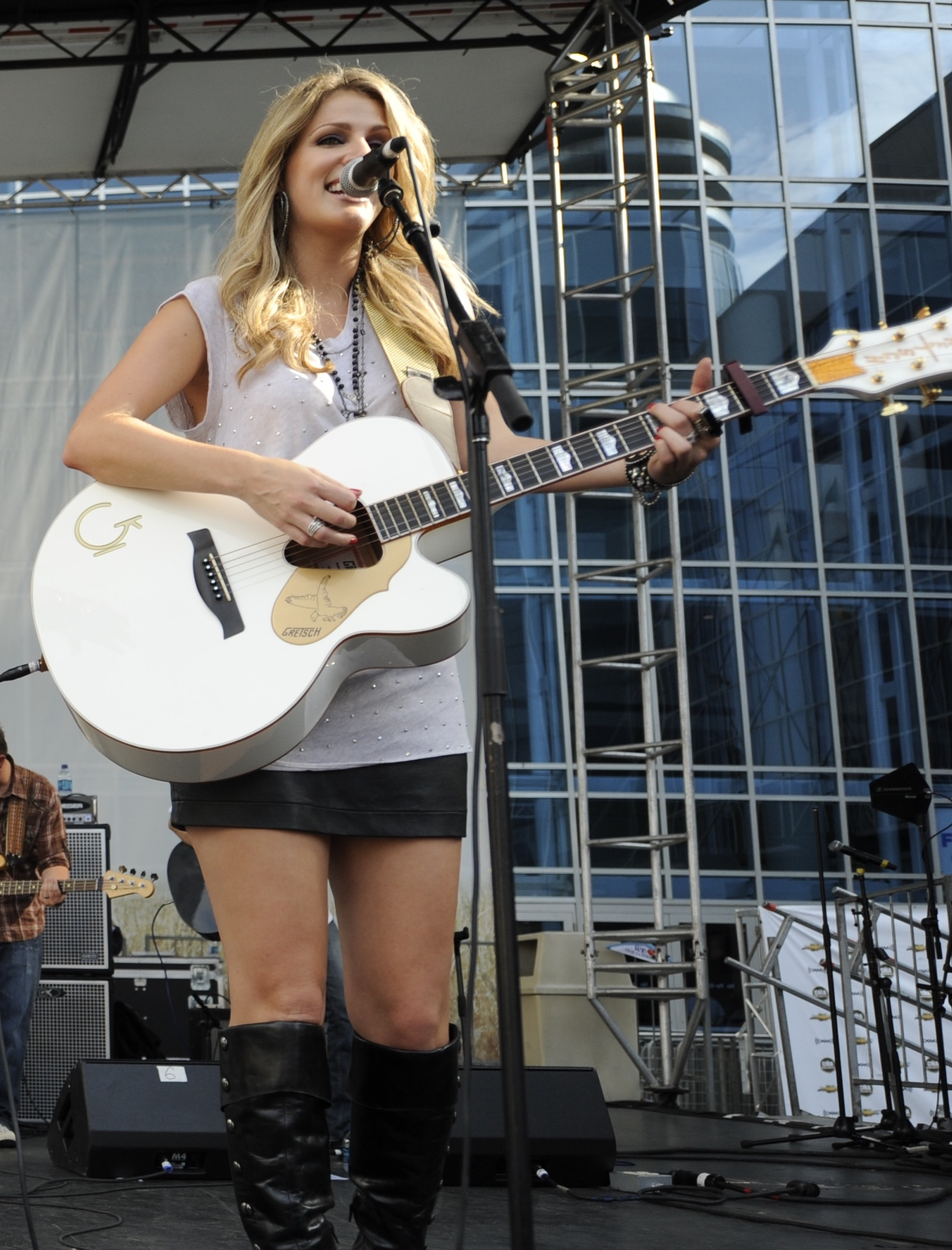
Top row (L-R): Mark Jackson, Mallory Ervin, Joey Graceffa, Meghan Camarena, Margie O'Donnell, Luke Adams, "Flight Time" Lang
Bottom row (L-R): "Big Easy" Lofton, Jet McCoy, Cord McCoy, Rachel Reilly, Brendon Villegas, Caroline Cutbirth, and Jennifer Wayne

Mark Jackson was originally set to compete with his original partner, Bopper Minton, but Bopper began showing signs of pancreatitis before arriving in Los Angeles for filming and was deemed unfit to compete by the production's medical team. As a last-minute replacement, Mallory Ervin flew in from Nashville to compete as Mark's teammate. This marked the first time that a team without a pre-existing relationship competed on The Amazing Race.

Contestants	Age	Relationship	Hometown	Status
Natalie Anderson	27	Twins; The Amazing Race 21	Edgewater, New Jersey	Eliminated 1st (in Guangzhou, China)
Nadiya Anderson	27	Twins; The Amazing Race 21	Edgewater, New Jersey	Eliminated 1st (in Guangzhou, China)
Mark Jackson	47	Team Kentucky; The Amazing Race 20 (Mark); The Amazing Race 17 & The Amazing Race 18 (Mallory)	Manchester, Kentucky	Eliminated 2nd (in Guangzhou, China)
Mallory Ervin	28	Team Kentucky; The Amazing Race 20 (Mark); The Amazing Race 17 & The Amazing Race 18 (Mallory)	Nashville, Tennessee	Eliminated 2nd (in Guangzhou, China)
Joey Graceffa	22	YouTube Hosts; The Amazing Race 22	Los Angeles, California	Eliminated 3rd (in Kota Kinabalu, Malaysia)
Meghan Camarena	26	YouTube Hosts; The Amazing Race 22	Los Angeles, California	Eliminated 3rd (in Kota Kinabalu, Malaysia)
Margie O'Donnell	56	Mother & Son; The Amazing Race 14 & The Amazing Race 18	Colorado Springs, Colorado	Eliminated 4th (in Colombo, Sri Lanka)
Luke Adams	28	Mother & Son; The Amazing Race 14 & The Amazing Race 18	Philadelphia, Pennsylvania	Eliminated 4th (in Colombo, Sri Lanka)
Jessica Hoel	27	Engaged; The Amazing Race 22	Eden Prairie, Minnesota	Eliminated 5th (in Rome, Italy)
John Erck	28	Engaged; The Amazing Race 22	Mora, Minnesota	Eliminated 5th (in Rome, Italy)
Herbert "Flight Time" Lang	37	Harlem Globetrotters; The Amazing Race 15 & The Amazing Race 18	Brinkley, Arkansas	Eliminated 6th (in Orvieto, Italy)
Nathaniel "Big Easy" Lofton	32	Harlem Globetrotters; The Amazing Race 15 & The Amazing Race 18	New Orleans, Louisiana	Eliminated 6th (in Orvieto, Italy)
Jet McCoy	34	Cowboys; The Amazing Race 16 & The Amazing Race 18	Ada, Oklahoma	Eliminated 7th (in Seville, Spain)
Cord McCoy	33	Cowboys; The Amazing Race 16 & The Amazing Race 18	Tupelo, Oklahoma	Eliminated 7th (in Seville, Spain)
Leo Temory	27	Cousins; The Amazing Race 23	Torrance, California	Eliminated 8th (in Peckforton, England)
Jamal Zadran	26	Cousins; The Amazing Race 23	Irvine, California	Eliminated 8th (in Peckforton, England)
Brendon Villegas	33	Newlyweds; The Amazing Race 20	Los Angeles, California	Third place
Rachel Reilly	29	Newlyweds; The Amazing Race 20	Los Angeles, California	Third place
Caroline Cutbirth	30	Country Singers; The Amazing Race 22	Waco, Texas	Runners-up
Jennifer Wayne	31	Country Singers; The Amazing Race 22	Nashville, Tennessee	Runners-up
Dave O'Leary	59	Father & Son; The Amazing Race 22	Salt Lake City, Utah	Winners
Connor O'Leary	22	Father & Son; The Amazing Race 22	Salt Lake City, Utah	Winners

Future appearances

Leo & Jamal and Rachel Reilly returned to compete on The Amazing Race: Reality Showdown. Caroline & Jennifer appeared as clue givers during the finale of season 34 in Nashville. Flight Time and Big Easy and Jet and Cord appeared on The Amazing Race: 25 Years Around the World.

Not long after this season aired, Natalie & Nadiya Anderson competed on Survivor: San Juan del Sur. Natalie returned to compete on Survivor: Winners at War. Nadiya also made an appearance as part of the loved ones visit. Natalie competed on the thirty-sixth season of the MTV reality show The Challenge, but withdrew in the fifth episode after learning that she was pregnant.

On May 25, 2016, Leo & Jamal, Flight Time & Big Easy, and Bopper & Mark appeared on an Amazing Race-themed primetime special episode of The Price Is Right. Rachel Reilly appeared on a Big Brother-themed episode the day before, and Natalie Anderson appeared on a Survivor-themed episode two days prior. Flight Time & Big Easy also appeared on 100 Day Dream Home in 2021. In 2022, Leo competed on the first season of The Challenge: USA. In 2022, Rachel was a contestant on Snake in the Grass. She also competed on the 2023 Peacock reality TV series The Traitors. In 2025, Reilly competed on Worst Cooks in America Celebrity Edition: Heroes vs. Villains. Later that year, she competed on Big Brother 27. In 2026, Natalie Anderson competed on the fourth season of The Traitors.

== Results ==
The following teams are listed with their placements in each leg. Placements are listed in finishing order.

- A red placement with a dagger (†) indicates that the team was eliminated.
- An underlined blue placement with a double-dagger (‡) indicates that the team was the last to arrive at a Pit Stop in a non-elimination leg, and had to perform a Speed Bump task in the following leg.
- A purple ε indicates that the team used an Express Pass on that leg to bypass one of their tasks.
- A brown ⊃ indicates that the team used the U-Turn and a brown ⊂ indicates the team on the receiving end of the U-Turn.

Team placement (by leg)
Team	1 (Note: The placements from leg 1 and departure order for leg 2 differ because several teams received time credits due to production difficulties. The original placements before adjustment were: Dave & Connor (3rd), Margie & Luke (4th), Jessica & John (8th), Caroline & Jennifer (9th), and Joey & Meghan (10th).)	2	3	4	5	6	7	8	9	10	11	12
Dave & Connor	4th	4th	1st	2nd	1st	4th	3rd	4th^{⊂}_{⊃} (Note: Brendon & Rachel chose to use the U-Turn on Dave & Connor.) (Note: Dave & Connor chose to use the U-Turn on Leo & Jamal.)	1st	1st	1st	1st
Caroline & Jennifer	10th	3rdε (Note: Caroline & Jennifer used their Express Pass to bypass the Roadblock on this leg.)	6th	4th	2nd	7th‡	2nd	5th	5th‡	4th	2nd	2nd
Brendon & Rachel	2nd	1st	8th	8th‡	7th	5th	1st	1st⊃	4th	2nd	3rd	3rd
Leo & Jamal	5th	7th	3rd	3rd	4th	1st	5th	3rd⊂	3rd	3rd⊃ (Note: Leo & Jamal chose to use the U-Turn on Jet & Cord.)	4th†	
Jet & Cord	1st	6th	2nd	1st	3rd	2nd	4th	2ndε (Note: Jet & Cord used their Express Pass to bypass the Detour on this leg.)	2nd	5th†⊂		
Flight Time & Big Easy	7th	5th	5th	6th	6th	6th	6th	6th†				
Jessica & John	9th	8th	7th	5th	5th	3rd	7th†					
Margie & Luke	3rd	2nd	4th	7th	8th†							
Joey & Meghan	8th	9th	9th†									
Mark & Mallory	6th	10th†										
Natalie & Nadiya	11th†											

== Race summary ==
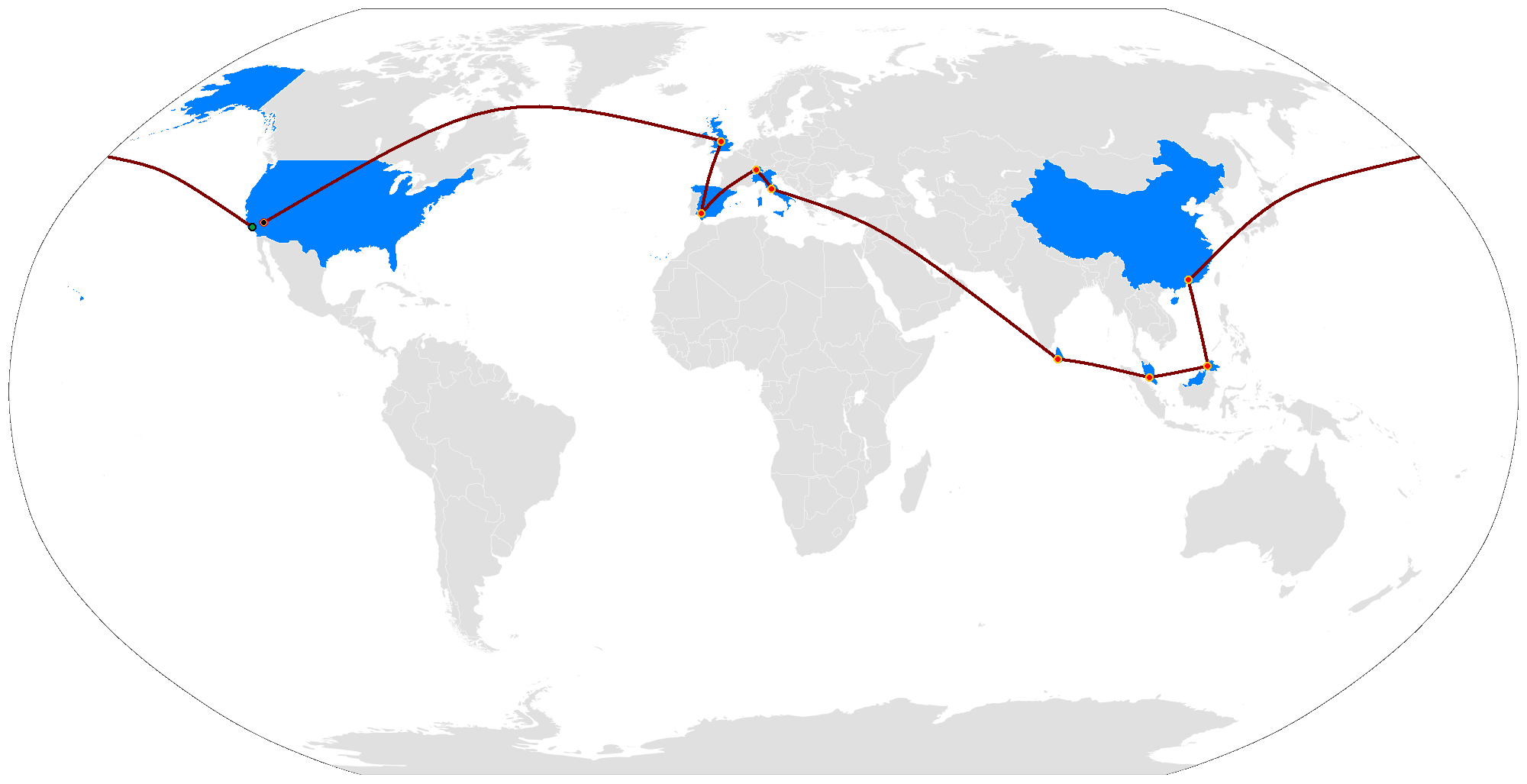
The complete route of The Amazing Race 24.

Destinations	Air travel Rail travel Water travel Bus travel Helicopter travel Bicycle travel Gondola travel
Route Markers	Detour Roadblock U-Turn Speed Bump Pit Stop

=== Leg 1 (United States → China) ===
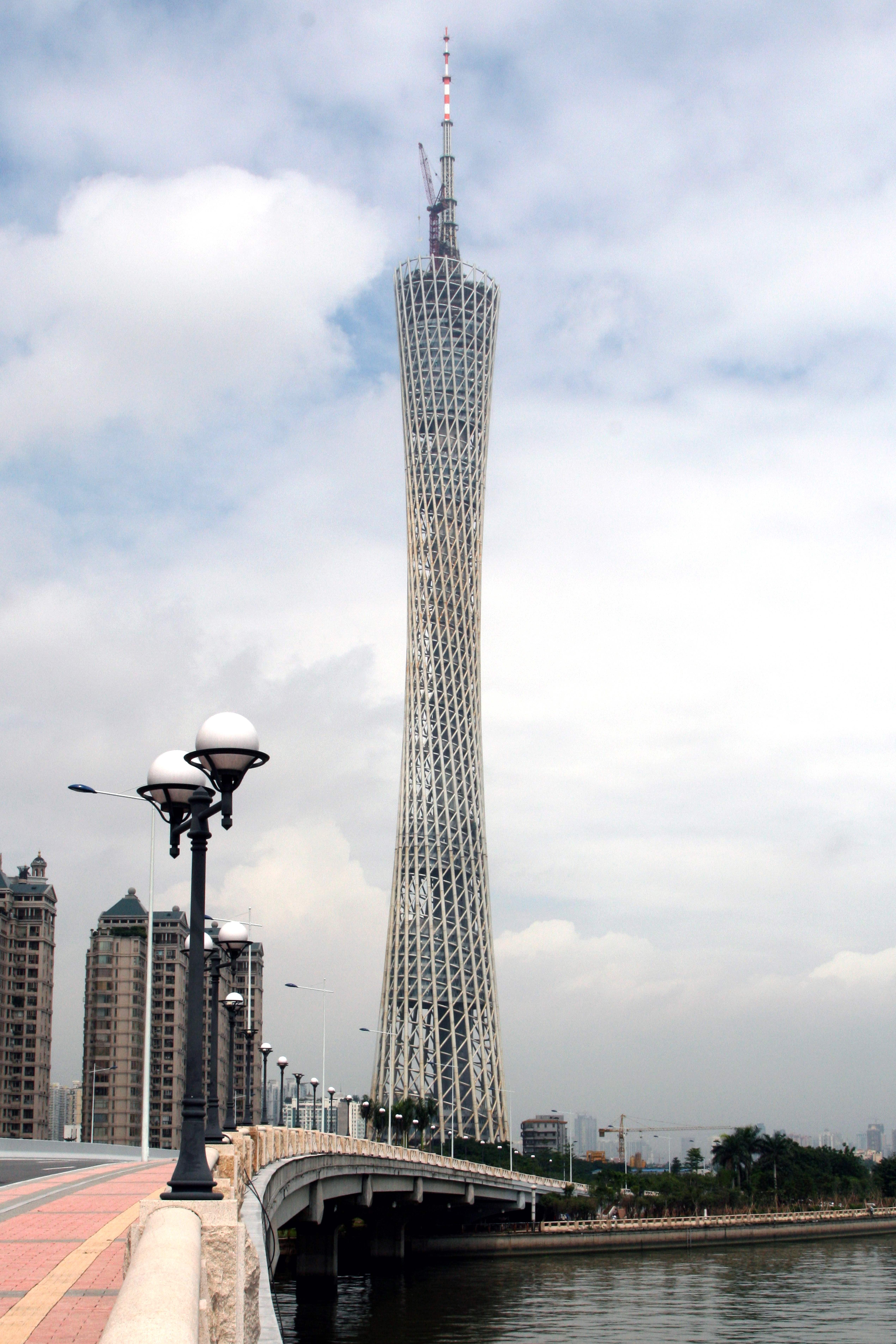
In Guangzhou, teams traveled to the Canton Tower and rode its Ferris wheel in order to search for their next clue.

- Episode 1: "Back in the Saddle" (February 23, 2014)
- Prize: Two Express Passes (awarded to Jet & Cord; one for themselves and the other to be given to another team)
- Eliminated: Natalie & Nadiya

Locations

- Santa Clarita, California (College of the Canyons – Cougar Stadium) (Starting Line)
- Los Angeles → Guangzhou, China
- Guangzhou (Jiangnan Avenue North – Precious One, Silver Gorgeous, or Rich Forest & Beauty)
- Guangzhou (Canton Tower)
- Guangzhou (Haixinsha Stadium)
- Guangzhou (Guangzhou Opera House)

Episode summary

- At Cougar Stadium, teams had to find one of several UCLA Bruin Marching Band members with the Chinese symbols for Guangzhou – 广州 – on their shako, which matched the badges displayed on the shakos of the field commanders, and bring the band member to Phil Keoghan. The first four teams who found a band member with the correct shako received tickets on the first flight to Guangzhou, China. It arrived one hour before the second flight, which carried the remaining seven teams.
- After arriving in Guangzhou, teams went to the city's wedding boutique district and searched for one of three boutiques that had their next clue. Each store had only a limited number of clues, which directed teams to find "the building with the bubbles on top", giving them a replica "bubble", and they had to figure out that it referred to the Canton Tower. There, teams had to select one of the bubble cars of the Ferris wheel located at the top of the tower and search for their clue, which was only revealed when the door to the car closed. Depending on which car they entered, the clue either informed teams to try another car or directed them to their next location: Haixinsha Stadium.
- In this season's first Roadblock, one racer had to perform five aerial somersaults while suspended 300 feet (91 m) in the air attached by wires to the stadium's towers in order to receive their next clue, which directed them to the Pit Stop: the Guangzhou Opera House.

=== Leg 2 (China) ===
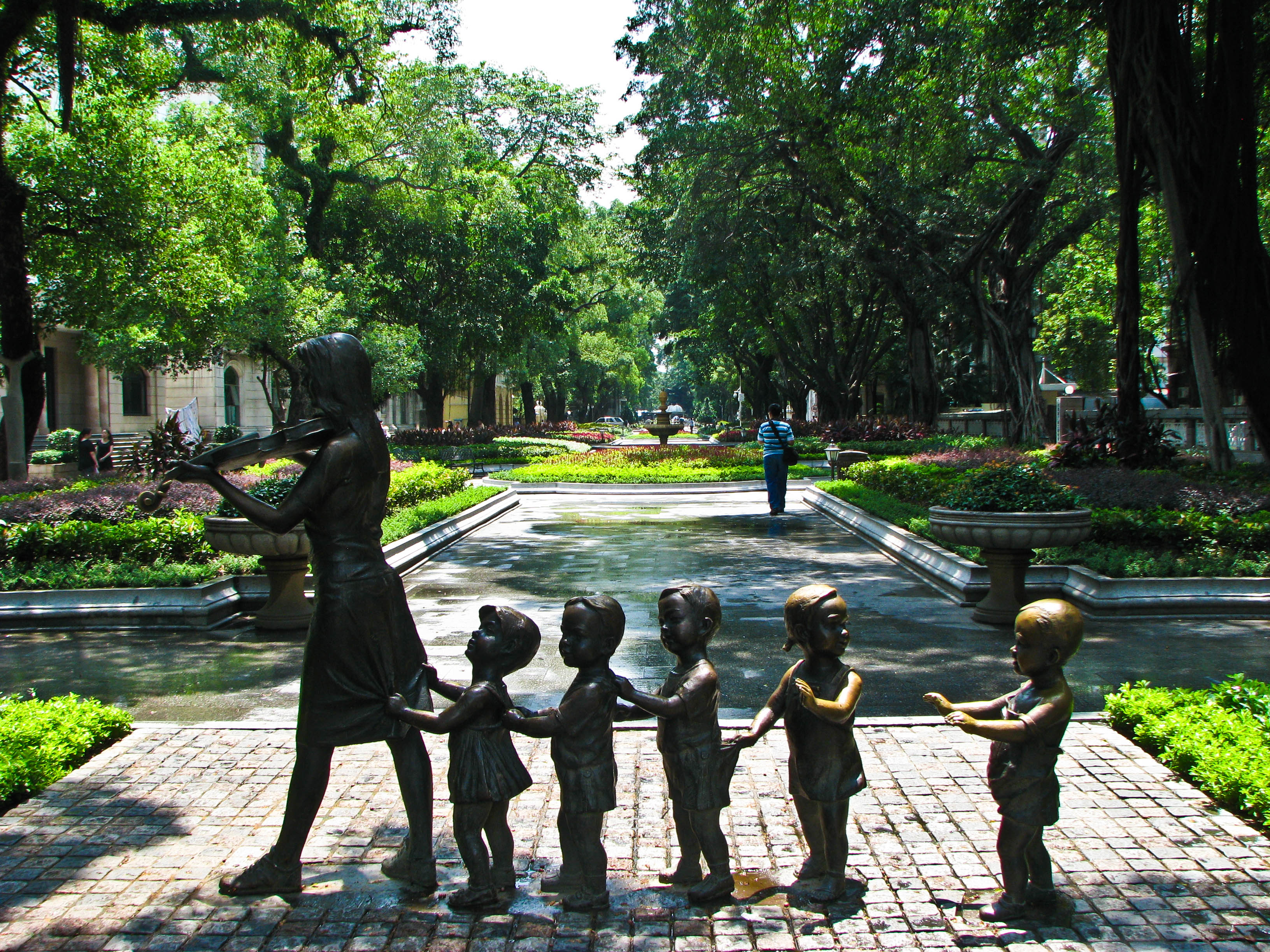
Teams ended the second leg in Guangzhou at Shamian Island, which hosts several colonial European buildings.

- Episode 2: "Baby Bear's Soup" (March 2, 2014)
- Prize: US$2,500 each (awarded to Brendon & Rachel)
- Eliminated: Mark & Mallory

Locations

- Guangzhou (Guangzhou Opera House)
- Guangzhou (Chen Clan Academy)
- Guangzhou (Gate 5 Mall – Edaytown Guangzhou)
- Guangzhou (Guangzhou Children's Activities Center)
- Guangzhou (Liwanhu Park or Sauna Center)
- Guangzhou (Shamian Island Promenade)

Episode summary

- At the start of this leg, teams went to the Chen Clan Academy, where they had to watch a martial arts demonstration. Afterwards, the master stamped the name of their next destination in Mandarin Chinese on the foreheads of both team members.
- In this leg's Roadblock, one team member had to correctly assemble a child's motorized car in order to receive their next clue. Caroline & Jennifer used their Express Pass to bypass this Roadblock.
- After the Roadblock, teams had to deliver the toy car they had assembled to the Guangzhou Children's Activities Center in order to receive their next clue.
- This season's first Detour was a choice between Featherball or China Cup. In Featherball, teams had to play jianzi (a game similar to hackeysack) with two local players. Once the teams successfully volleyed the shuttlecock a combined ten times, they could receive their next clue. In China Cup, each team member had to receive a traditional massage involving cupping therapy in order to receive their next clue.
- After the Detour, teams had to check in at the Pit Stop: the Shamian Island Promenade.

Additional note

- During the Roadblock, Jet & Cord gave their second Express Pass to Caroline & Jennifer.

=== Leg 3 (China → Malaysia) ===
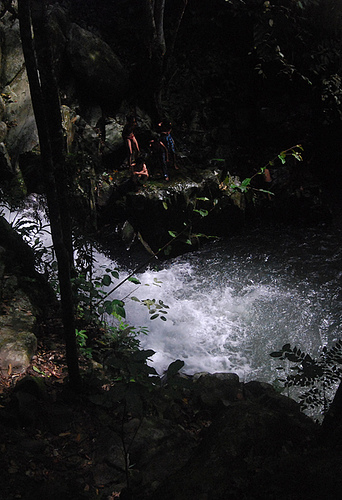
The Roadblock in Sabah had racers rappelling down the Kiansom Waterfall.

- Episode 3: "Welcome to the Jungle" (March 9, 2014)
- Prize: A trip for two to Budapest, Hungary (awarded to Dave & Connor)
- Eliminated: Joey & Meghan

Locations

- Guangzhou (Shamian Island Promenade)
- Guangzhou (Guangzhou Baiyun International Airport) → Kota Kinabalu, Malaysia
- Inanam (Kiansom Waterfall)
- Kiulu (Kampung Tompinahaton)
- Kiulu (Kampung Tombung or Kampung Linsuk)
- Kota Kinabalu (Tanjung Aru Water Village)

Episode summary

- At the start of this leg, teams were instructed to fly to Kota Kinabalu in Malaysian Borneo. There were only two available flights with limited seats from Guangzhou to Kota Kinabalu, so the first six teams to check in at the airport left three hours before the last three teams. Once there, teams had to travel to the Kiansom Waterfall in Inanam.
- In this leg's Roadblock, one team member had to take their Travelocity Roaming Gnome, travel through the treetops on a safety line, and then rappel down the waterfall, collecting their next clue along the way.
- After the Roadblock, teams had to travel to Kampung Tompinahaton in order to find their next clue.
- This leg's Detour was a choice between River Delivery or Run Through the Jungle. Teams had to first build a bamboo raft, which they used to travel down the river to their Detour choice. In River Delivery, teams had to pick up goods from a depot, carry them down river to the town of Kampung Tombung, and then deliver the goods to the village elder. In Run Through the Jungle, teams joined a Murut hunting guide who led them through the jungle to several fake bird targets. Using a blowgun, the teams had to each successfully knock over one target. After completing either Detour task, teams were directed to return to their rafts and continue down the river before receiving their next clue, which directed them to the Pit Stop: Tanjung Aru Water Village.

=== Leg 4 (Malaysia) ===
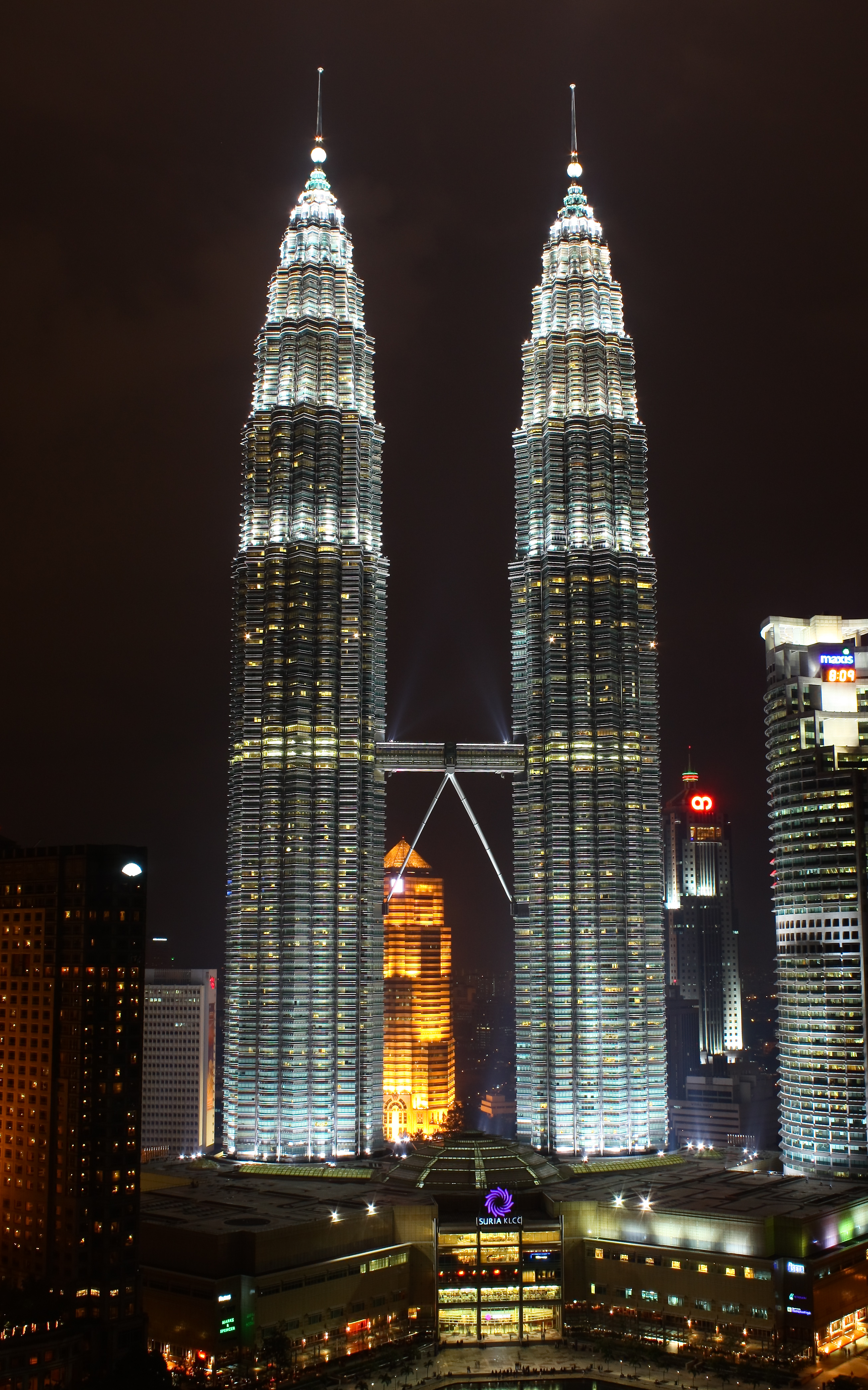
In Kuala Lumpur, teams visited the Petronas Towers: the tallest twin buildings in the world.

- Episode 4: "Smarter, Not Harder" (March 16, 2014)
- Prize: A trip for two to London, England (awarded to Jet & Cord)

Locations

- Kota Kinabalu (Tanjung Aru Water Village)
- Kota Kinabalu (Prince Philip Park – Murut Longhouse)
- Kota Kinabalu (Kota Kinabalu International Airport) → Kuala Lumpur
- Kuala Lumpur (Jalan Ampang Intersection)
- Kuala Lumpur (Traders Hotel – Skybar)
- Gombak (Batu Caves – Lord Murugan Statue)

Episode summary

- At the start of this leg, teams had to travel by taxi to the Murut Longhouse in Prince Philip Park, where they found their next clue.
- In this leg's Roadblock, one team member participated in a traditional Lansaran dance, in which they bounced on a bamboo springboard with a group of locals. At the climax of the dance, the racer used the springboard to launch themselves high enough to grab a flag positioned above them, which they could exchange for their next clue. If more than one team was present, team members were only allowed three jumps before another team took their turn.
- Teams were instructed to fly to Kuala Lumpur. Only three flights to Kuala Lumpur were available to the teams. The first three teams to check in at the airport were booked on the first flight, which left 90 minutes before the second flight that carried two teams, which itself was scheduled to leave 45 minutes before the last flight. However, the second flight suffered a 50-minute delay, putting it a few minutes behind the third flight. Once there, teams had to travel to the Jalan Ampang intersection, where they found their next clue beneath the Petronas Towers.
- This leg's Detour was a choice between Mix Master or Master Mix. In Mix Master, teams had to learn to scratch on a DJ table and then perform in front of a DJ and the crowd, receiving their next clue if each team member was able to replicate a series of seven record scratches to the DJ's approval. If teams did not perform the scratching properly, they had to allow other teams in line to perform before they could try again. In Master Mix, teams had to stack seven cocktail glasses into a two-tier pyramid and then use a stack of mixing glasses to pour differently colored cocktails into each glass simultaneously such that none of the cocktails mixed in order to receive their next clue.
- After the Detour, teams had to check in at the Pit Stop: the Lord Murugan Statue at the entrance to the Batu Caves in Gombak.

Additional notes

- After pouring the drinks, teams were required to deliver a tray of cocktails before receiving their clue. This element of the task was unaired.
- This was a non-elimination leg.

=== Leg 5 (Malaysia → Sri Lanka) ===
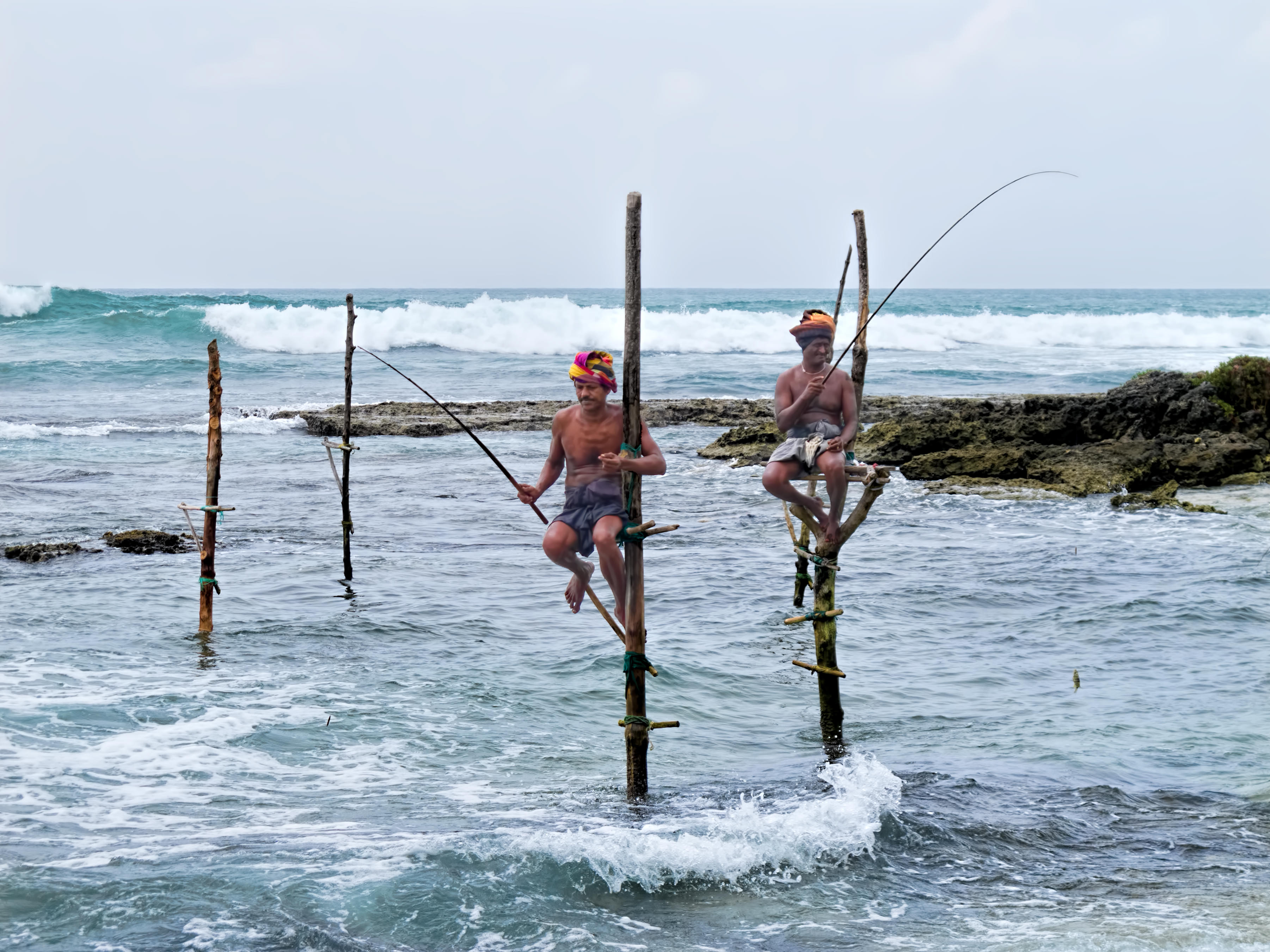
One of the Detour choices paid tribute to the traditional angling fishermen of Sri Lanka.

- Episode 5: "Can't Make Fish Bite" (March 23, 2014)
- Prize: US$5,000 each (awarded to Dave & Connor)
- Eliminated: Margie & Luke

Locations

- Gombak (Batu Caves – Lord Murugan Statue)
- Kuala Lumpur → Colombo, Sri Lanka
- Colombo (Gangaramaya Temple)
- Colombo → Galle
- Koggala (King Coconut Stand)
- Ahangama (Harbor or School)
- Nugegoda (Trendy Connections Garment Factory)
- Colombo (Colombo Rowing Club)

Episode summary

- At the start of this leg, teams were instructed to fly to Colombo, Sri Lanka. Once there, teams had to travel to the Gangaramaya Temple, where they donned traditional Buddhist robes before receiving a blessing from the head monk and their next clue. Teams were then directed to travel by train to Galle and find their next clue at the king coconut stand in Koggala.
- This leg's Detour was a choice between Fishing Pole or Spin Control. In Fishing Pole, teams had to climb up traditional fishing stilts from which they could fish. Once each team member caught a fish, they could exchange it for their next clue. In Spin Control, teams had to learn a traditional Kandyan dance and then perform it while balancing a spinning raban on a stick in order to receive their next clue.
- After the Detour, teams had to travel to the Trendy Connections Garment Factory in order to find their next clue.
- For their Speed Bump, Brendon & Rachel had to properly use silk screening to apply the final color to fifteen tee-shirts bearing the flag of Sri Lanka before they could continue racing.
- In this leg's Roadblock, one team member had to properly sew a shirt in a garment factory. Once the floor manager approved the work, he directed the team to a heat transfer machine, which printed the name of their next Pit Stop onto the shirt: the Colombo Rowing Club.

Additional note

- After missing their flight, Margie & Luke fell so far behind that all of the other teams had checked in at the Pit Stop by the time they arrived in Colombo. Though Margie & Luke traveled to all of the locations in Sri Lanka, they did not actually complete any of the tasks.

=== Leg 6 (Sri Lanka) ===
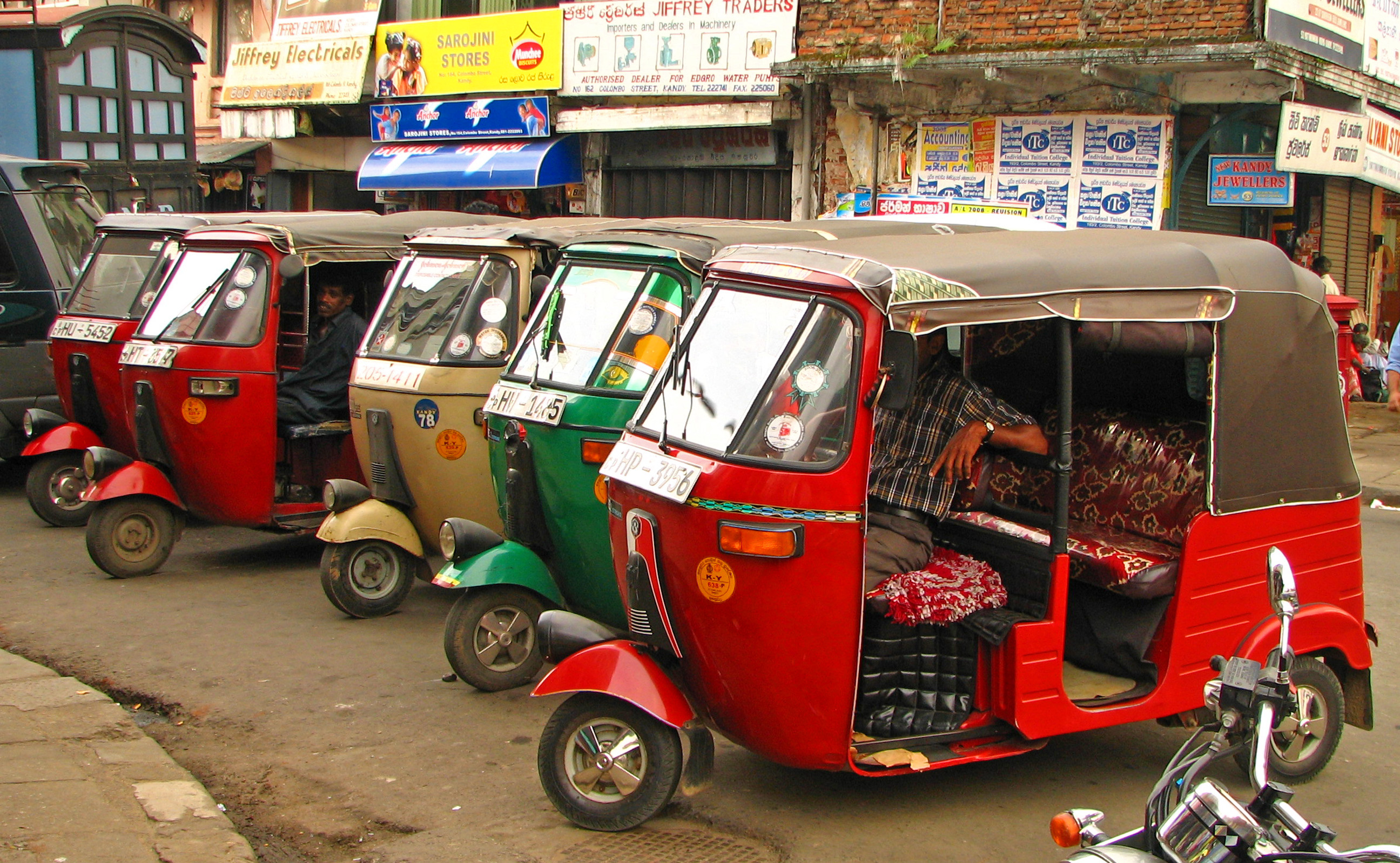
In the Roadblock, racers had to wrangle four tuk-tuks into a gasoline stand amid the chaos of a Sri Lankan street.

- Episode 6: "Down and Dirty" (March 30, 2014)
- Prize: A trip for two to Berlin, Germany (awarded to Leo & Jamal)

Locations

- Colombo (Colombo Rowing Club)
- Colombo (Dutch Museum)
- Colombo → Alawwa
- Alawwa (CEYPETCO Fuel Station)
- Alawwa → Rambukkana
- Rambukkana (Millennium Elephant Foundation)
- Ambepussa (Ambepussa Rest House)
- Mount Lavinia (Mount Lavinia Hotel – Beach)

Episode summary

- At the start of this leg, teams found their next clue at the Dutch Museum, which directed them to travel by train to Alawwa and search for their next clue at the CEYPETCO Fuel Station.
- In this leg's Roadblock, one team member had to choose a color badge in a gas station office and then search along a line of parked tuk-tuks for four that had the same color marked on their windshields. They then had to lead each tuk-tuk back to the gas station and fill their tanks with gasoline in order to receive their next clue.
- After the Roadblock, teams had to travel by train to Rambukkana and then travel by tuk-tuk to the Millennium Elephant Foundation in order to find their next clue.
- This leg's Detour was a choice between Trunk or Sheets. In Trunk, teams worked with an elephant to load a truck with timber. After the teams and the elephant carried three logs to the truck, the teams gave their elephant palm leaves and the mahout gave them their next clue. In Sheets, teams made paper using elephant dung. After collecting the dung in a wheelbarrow, teams took it to the paper mill, where it was mixed to make pulp. After teams made five sheets of paper, they received their next clue.
- After the Detour, teams had to travel to the Ambepussa Rest House, find the "wise man", and listen to his flute performance before receiving their next clue, which directed them to the Pit Stop: the beach at the Mount Lavinia Hotel.

Additional note

- This was a non-elimination leg.

=== Leg 7 (Sri Lanka → Italy) ===
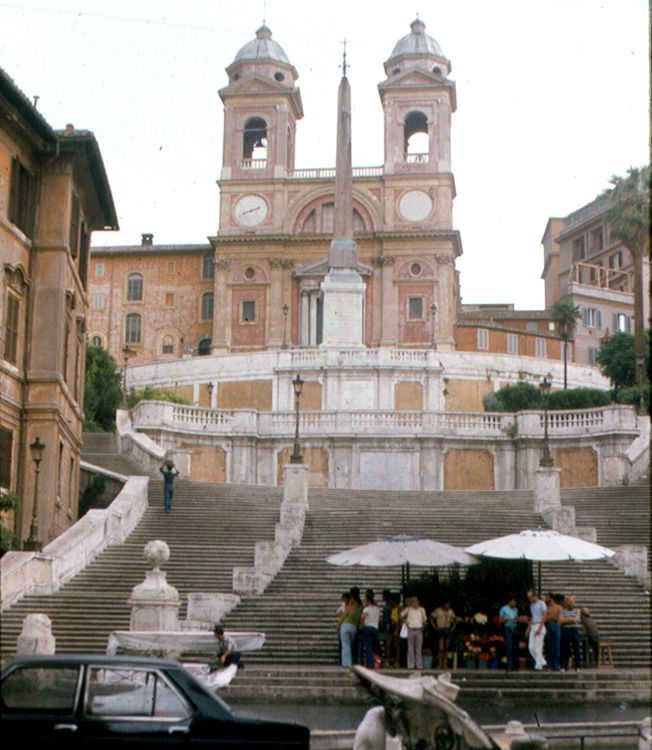
The Roadblock in Rome had racers climbing the famous Spanish Steps.

- Episode 7: "The Gladiators Are Here!" (April 13, 2014)
- Prize: A trip for two to the Great Barrier Reef in Australia (awarded to Brendon & Rachel)
- Eliminated: Jessica & John

Locations

- Mount Lavinia (Mount Lavinia Hotel Beach)
- Colombo → Rome, Italy
- Rome (Hadrian's Bridge)
- Rome (Pantheon & Monumento Nazionale a Vittorio Emanuele II)
- Rome (Parco del Celio or Parco del Colle Oppio)
- Rome (Piazza di Spagna)
- Rome (Spanish Steps & Trinità dei Monti)
- Rome (Piazza del Popolo)

Episode summary

- At the start of this leg, teams were instructed to travel to "The Eternal City" and find Hadrian's Bridge. Teams had to figure out that they needed to travel to Rome, Italy, and find the Ponte Sant'Angelo, where they found their next clue.
- For their Speed Bump, Caroline & Jennifer had to go to the Pantheon, pick up an antique typewriter, and drop it off at the Monumento Nazionale a Vittorio Emanuele II before they could continue racing.
- This leg's Detour was a choice between Gladiator or Charioteer. For both Detour options, teams had to don ancient Roman costumes. In Gladiator, teams learned a series of sword maneuvers to "battle" a seasoned gladiator in order to receive their next clue. If teams strayed from the battle sequence they were taught, they had to start over. In Charioteer, teams raced a radio-controlled chariot around a track with one team member controlling the speed and the other controlling the direction. Once teams completed five laps within one minute and thirty seconds, they received their next clue.
- After the Detour, teams were told to visit the "piazza of John Keats' unhappy Roman Holiday", which they had to figure out referred to the Piazza di Spagna at the base of the Spanish Steps.
- In this leg's Roadblock, one team member had to get a postcard from a vendor and count the total number of the Spanish Steps. They then had to add that total to the Roman numerals on the Obelisco Sallustiano in front of the Trinità dei Monti, which indicated its year of construction. They had to write down their sum in Roman numerals on the postcard and show it to a pair of Gregory Peck and Audrey Hepburn impersonators at the top of the steps. If they had the correct answer, they received their next clue. Otherwise, they had to go back down to the vendor to get a new postcard and try again.
- After the Roadblock, teams were told to head to "where the leg of the race ends and the Via Flaminia begins": the Piazza del Popolo.

=== Leg 8 (Italy) ===
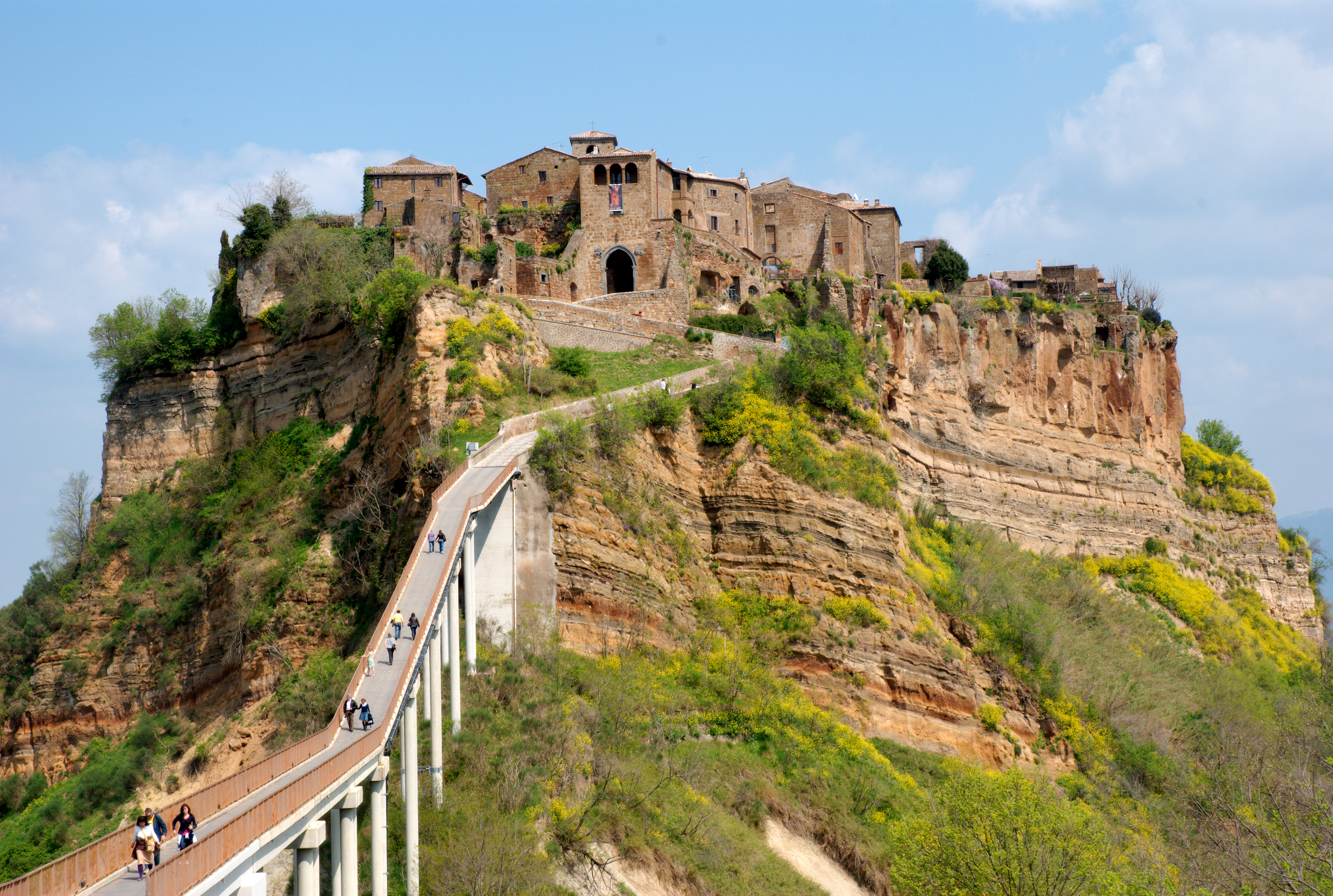
Teams visited the historic town of Civita di Bagnoregio for the Detour on this leg.

- Episode 8: "Donkeylicious" (April 20, 2014)
- Prize: US$7,500 each (awarded to Brendon & Rachel)
- Eliminated: Flight Time & Big Easy

Locations

- Rome (Villa Cagiati)
- Bagnoregio (Civita di Bagnoregio)
- Bagnoregio (Hostaria del Ponte)
- Orvieto (La Badia di Orvieto)
- Orvieto (Orvieto Funicular)
- Orvieto (Piazza del Duomo)

Episode summary

- At the start of this leg, teams had to drive themselves to Civita di Bagnoregio in the Italian countryside, where they found their next clue.
- This leg's Detour was a choice between Donkey Run or Donkey Build. In Donkey Run, teams had to choose a pair of donkeys and then participate in the Palio della Tonna, a traditional donkey race. If they could make three laps before the band stopped playing, they received their next clue. In Donkey Build, teams had to build a wooden donkey-shaped trolley using all of the pieces provided, load it with wood, and then deliver the wood to "Geppetto" in order to receive their next clue. Jet & Cord used their Express Pass to bypass this Detour.
- After the Detour, teams had to travel on foot to the Hostaria del Ponte in order to find their next clue, which directed them to La Badia di Orvieto.
- In this leg's Roadblock, one team member had to copy a page out of an illuminated manuscript, just as monks did before the invention of the printing press. Once they properly copied the page's calligraphy and gold leaf, they received their next clue.
- After the Roadblock, teams had to ride the funicular to the Pit Stop at the Piazza del Duomo in Orvieto.

Additional note

- This leg featured a Double U-Turn. Brendon & Rachel chose to use the U-Turn on Dave & Connor, while Dave & Connor chose to use the U-Turn on Leo & Jamal.

=== Leg 9 (Italy → Switzerland) ===
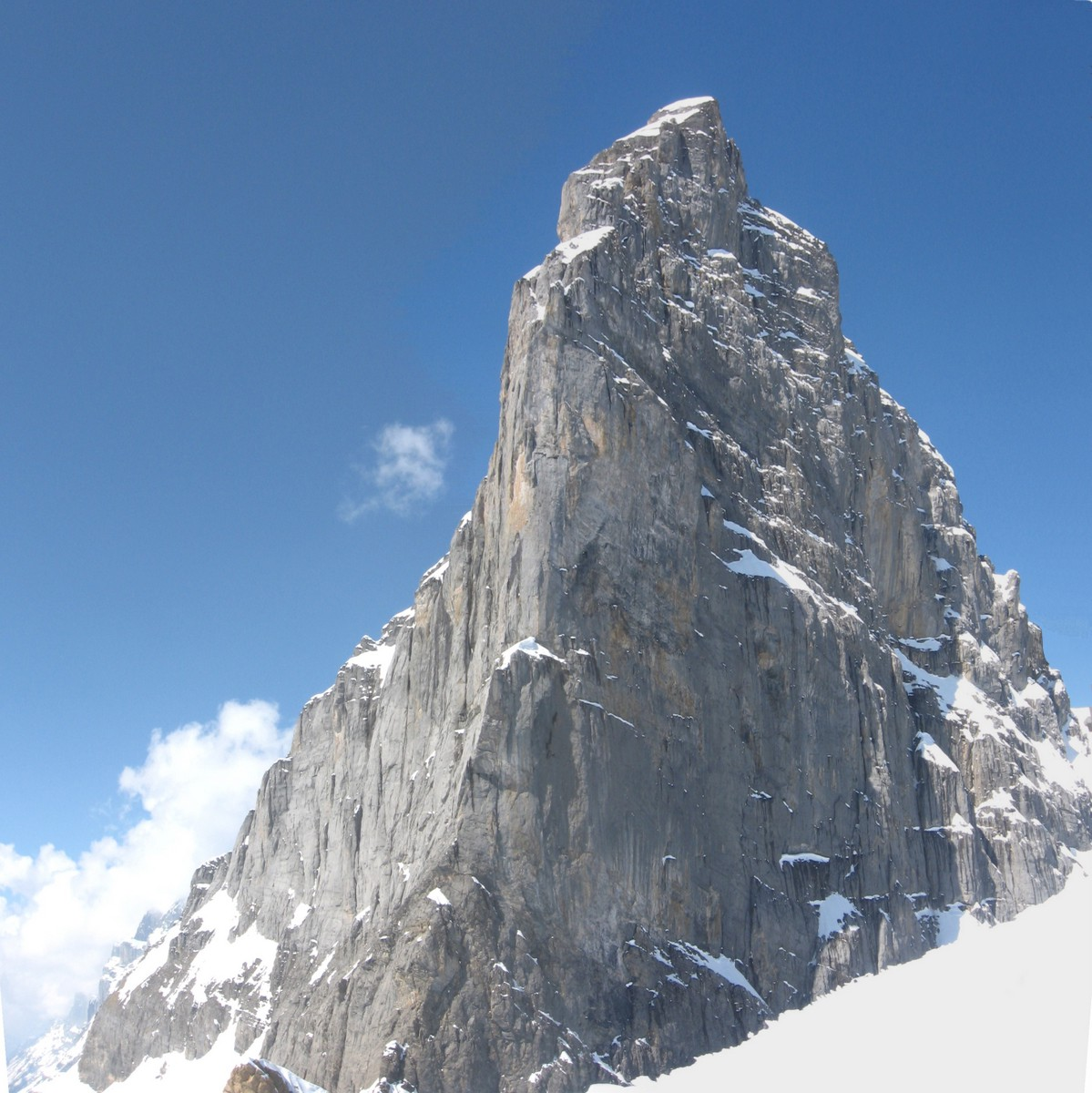
The Pit Stop for this leg was at the top of Switzerland's Mount Titlis.

- Episode 9: "Accidental Alliance" (April 27, 2014)
- Prize: Pair of 2015 Ford Mustangs (awarded to Dave & Connor)

Locations

- Orvieto (Piazza del Duomo)
- Rome → Chiasso, Switzerland
- Altdorf (Tell Monument)
- Lucerne (Chapel Bridge)
- Lucerne (Hotel Schweizerhof)
- Lucerne (Swiss Museum of Transport)
- Wolfenschiessen (Oberrickenbach)
- Wolfenschiessen (Bannalpsee)
- Engelberg → Trübsee → Mount Titlis

Episode summary

- At the start of this leg, teams were instructed to travel by train to Chiasso, Switzerland. Once there, teams had to drive to Altdorf and wait at the Tell Monument for a William Tell impersonator, who had their next clue. Teams were instructed to drive to Lucerne and find their next clue on the oldest wooden bridge in Europe: the Chapel Bridge. Teams then had to travel to the Hotel Schweizerhof, don cleaning staff uniforms, and clean a room so that it matched an example room in order to receive their next clue.
- Teams then had to drive to the Swiss Museum of Transport, search the grounds for a marked artifact, and figure out that it was a massive drill bit for a tunnel boring machine. Teams were directed to search the museum for the Ford Mustang exhibit and pick a classic Mustang with their next clue, which instructed them to use the road signs on the museum's exhibit that listed distances to other Swiss cities and a formula included in their clue to calculate the model year of the Mustang they had chosen. Once teams had the correct answer, they received their next clue, which directed them to drive to Oberrickenbach.
- In this leg's Roadblock, one team member had to pick a Bernese Mountain Dog with a cart containing two empty milk jugs and guide their dog to one of two gondola stations. After unloading the milk jugs and riding the gondola to the top station, they had to carry the jugs to a dairy farm and trade them for full ones. They then had to carry the full jugs back to the gondola and down to their dog, before bringing the dog and full milk jugs to the milk truck, where they received their next clue.
- After the Roadblock, teams had to travel by gondola to the top of Mount Titlis and check in at the Pit Stop.

Additional note

- This was a non-elimination leg.

=== Leg 10 (Switzerland → Spain) ===
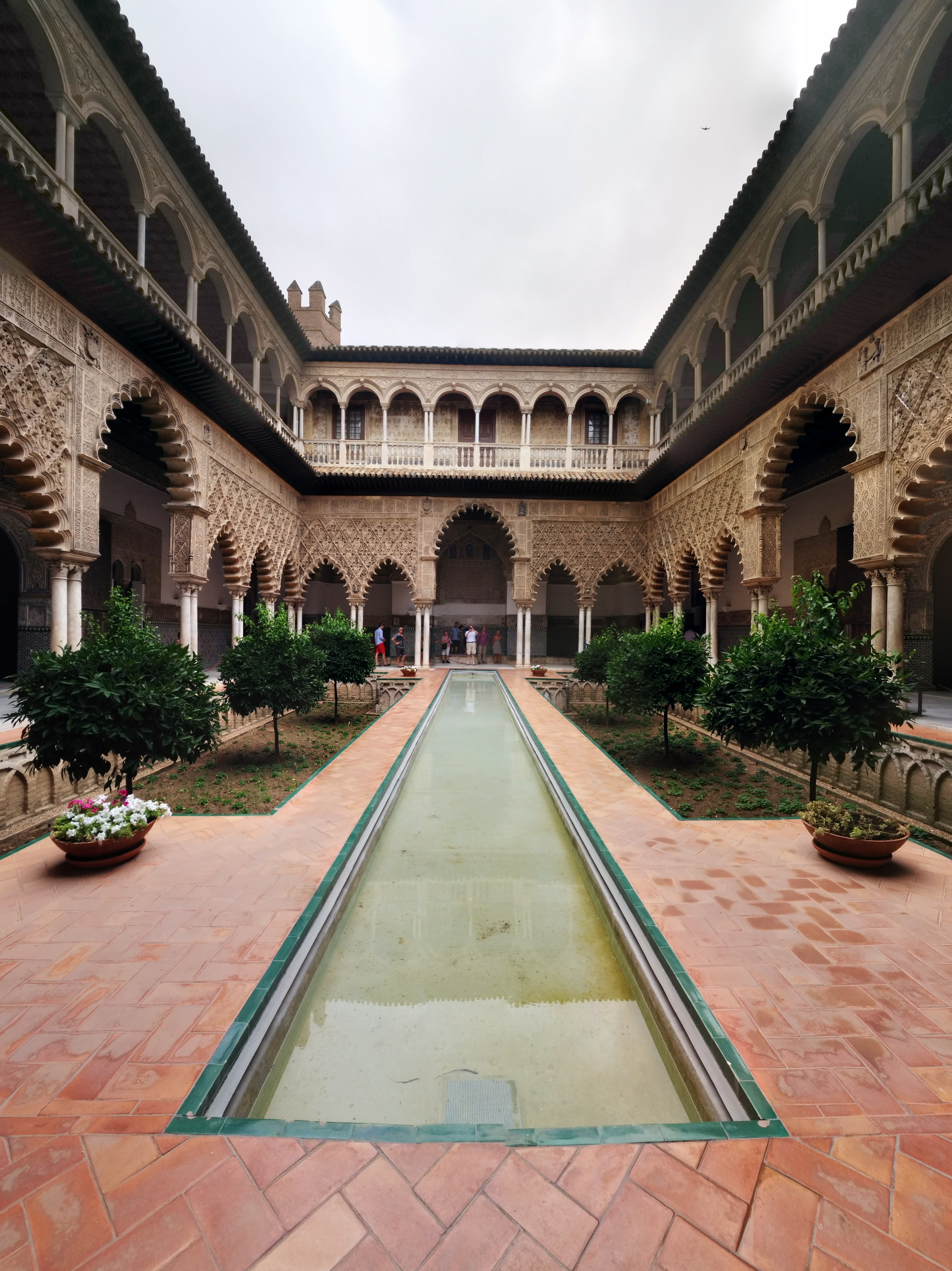
In Seville, teams visited the Patio de las Doncellas inside Real Alcázar in the Muslim section of the old city.

- Episode 10: "Bull Down" (May 4, 2014)
- Prize: A trip for two to Saint Croix (awarded to Dave & Connor)
- Eliminated: Jet & Cord

Locations

- Engelberg (Engelberg Cable Car Station)
- Zürich → Seville, Spain
- Seville (La Alameda – Statues of Hercules & Julius Caesar)
- Seville (Melado Peluqueros)
- Seville (Real Alcázar – Patio de las Doncellas)
- Seville (Las Teresas Café Bar)
- Seville (Museo del Baile Flamenco or Calle Lope de Rueda)
- Seville (General Archive of the Indies)
- Seville (Plaza de América) (Unaired)
- Seville (Plaza de España)

Episode summary

- At the start of this leg, teams were instructed to fly to Seville, Spain. Once there, teams had to find a bugler playing "Reveille" beneath the statues of Hercules and Julius Caesar at La Alameda, where they received their next clue directing them to Melado Peluqueros.
- In this leg's Roadblock, one team member had to apply shaving cream to a balloon and then use a straight razor to remove all of the shaving cream within 60 seconds in order to receive their next clue. If they popped the balloon or ran out of time, they had to start over.
- After the Roadblock, teams had to travel to the Patio de las Doncellas in Real Alcázar, where they found their next clue.
- For their Speed Bump, Caroline & Jennifer had to deliver six jamónes ibéricos through the streets and alleys of Seville to Las Teresas Café Bar before they could continue racing.
- This leg's Detour was a choice between Spanish Steps or Running with the Ballz. In Spanish Steps, teams had to learn a traditional flamenco routine and correctly perform it on stage in order to receive their next clue. In Running with the Ballz, teams wore Bumperz designed to look like bulls and ran through the streets of Seville, trying to avoid other "bulls" while looking for fragments of a motto printed on several posters along the route. Once teams reached the end of the course and could recite the full motto – "A matador never thinks about his own death" – they could receive their next clue.
- After the Detour, teams had to travel to the General Archive of the Indies in order to find their next clue, which directed them to check in at the Pit Stop: the Plaza de España.

Additional notes

- This leg featured a Double U-Turn. Leo & Jamal chose to use the U-Turn on Jet & Cord, while Caroline & Jennifer chose to use the U-Turn on Brendon & Rachel. However, Brendon & Rachel had already passed the U-Turn point and were therefore unaffected.
- In an unaired segment, teams had to travel by horse-drawn carriage from the Plaza de América to the Pit Stop at the Plaza de España.

=== Leg 11 (Spain → England & Wales) ===
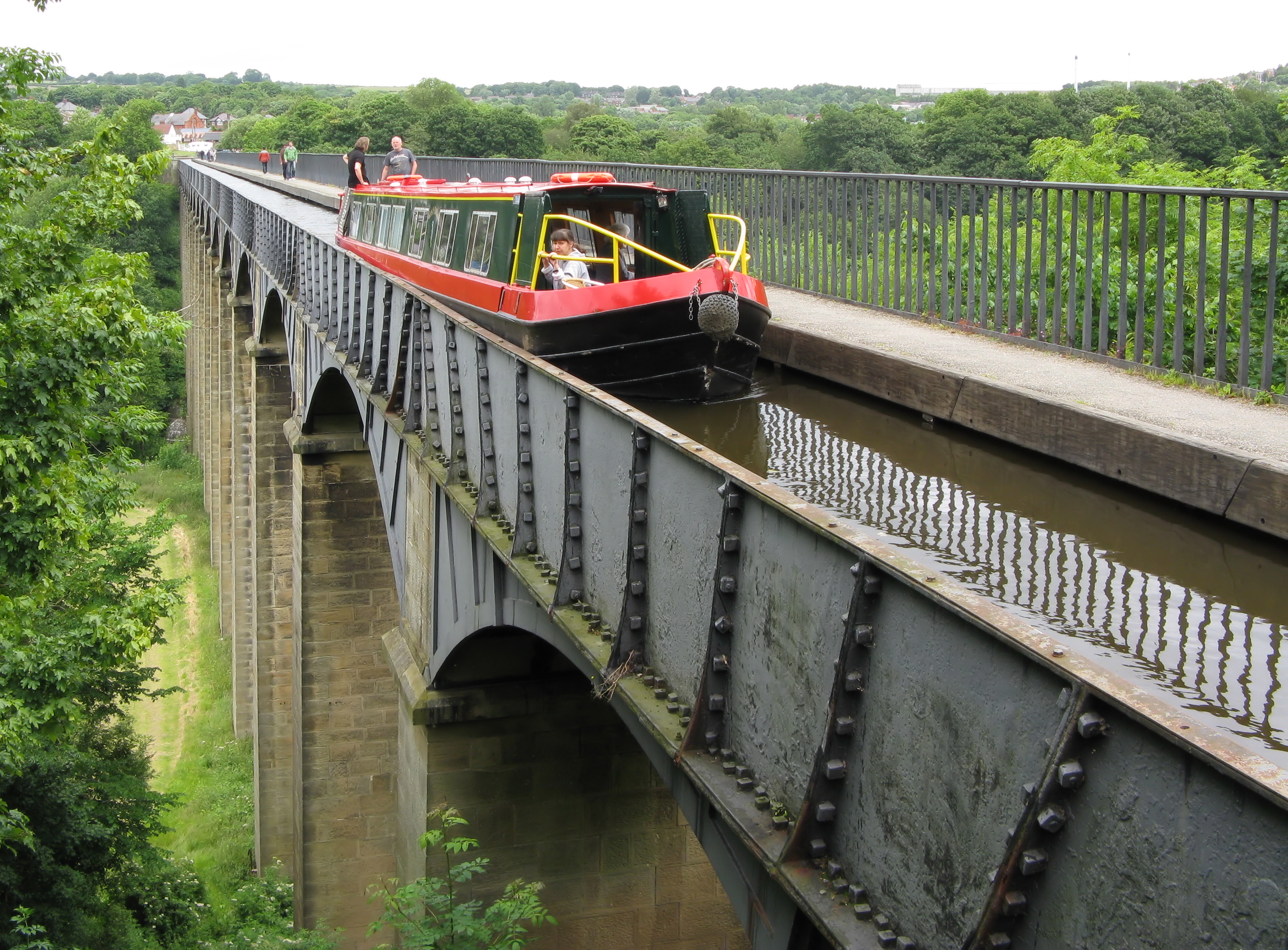
In Wales, racers performed the Welsh poem Roadblock high above the countryside on a 15-minute boat ride across the Pontcysyllte Aqueduct.

- Episode 11: "Hei Ho Heidi Ho" (May 11, 2014)
- Prize: A trip for two to Fiji (awarded to Dave & Connor)
- Eliminated: Leo & Jamal

Locations

- Seville (Plaza de España)
- Seville → Madrid
- Madrid → London, England
- Liverpool (Anfield)
- Froncysyllte, Wales (Pontcysyllte Aqueduct)
- Tattenhall, England (Bolesworth Estate)
- Peckforton (Peckforton Castle)

Episode summary

- At the start of this leg, teams were instructed to travel by train to Madrid and then fly to London, England. Once there, teams had to drive themselves to the Anfield Stadium in Liverpool. There, each team member had to score two penalty kicks against a professional goalkeeper in order to receive their next clue, which directed them to the Pontcysyllte Aqueduct.
- In this leg's Roadblock, one team member had to ride on one of the aqueduct's canal boats and work with a Welsh language instructor to learn one verse of the Welsh poem "Y Sipsi!". After the 15-minute boat ride to the other side of the aqueduct, they had to recite the poem from memory in order to receive their next clue.
- After the Roadblock, teams had to drive to Bolesworth Estate and find their next clue.
- This season's final Detour was a choice between Shoot It or Boot It. In Shoot It, teams participated in clay pigeon shooting and had to hit a total of 16 clay pigeons in order to receive their next clue. In Boot It, teams participated in boot throwing. After searching through a pile of Wellington boots to find a pair of either size 9s or size 11s, teams had to fill them with water and throw them along a course until they reached the finish line. At the end of the course, they received their next clue.
- After the Detour, teams had to check in at the Pit Stop: Peckforton Castle.

=== Leg 12 (England → United States) ===
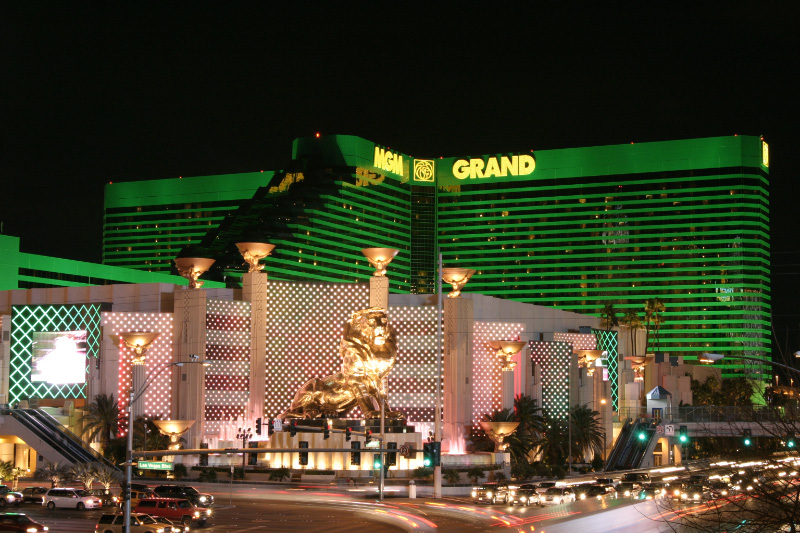
After arriving in Las Vegas, teams performed a stunt with illusionist David Copperfield at the MGM Grand in this last leg of the race.

- Episode 12: "Do You Believe in Magic?" (May 18, 2014)
- Prize: US$1,000,000
- Winners: Dave & Connor
- Second Place: Caroline & Jennifer
- Third Place: Brendon & Rachel

Locations

- Carden (Carden Park Luxury Hotel)
- London → Las Vegas, Nevada
- North Las Vegas (Desert)
- Las Vegas (MGM Grand)
- Las Vegas (Neon Boneyard)
- Las Vegas (The Mirage)
- Henderson (Maverick Helicopters)
- Las Vegas (Las Vegas Motor Speedway)

Episode summary

- At the start of this leg, teams were instructed to fly to Las Vegas, Nevada. Once there, teams had to search outside of the airport for a marked car and were driven to an isolated location in the desert, where their driver simply told them to dig. Teams eventually unearthed a box containing keys that directed them to find David Copperfield at the MGM Grand.
- In this leg's first Roadblock, one team member was shackled to the inside of a crate and handed keys after the crate was closed. After unlocking the shackles, racer had to retrieve lock picks while the crate was lifted off of the ground and lit on fire. Once the racer said that they were done, their partner set off a series of switches that dropped the box into a burning pile of wood and set off a fiery explosion. Copperfield then informed the partner that they had to get the fire department's assistance, and the racer in the crate appeared unharmed wearing a firefighter uniform. Copperfield then gave them their next clue.
- After the Roadblock, teams were directed to the Neon Boneyard. Their next clue instructed teams to remove a light bulb from a sign and take it with them to The Mirage, where they were hoisted on a window-washing scaffold to one of the hotel's signs atop the tower. They had to replace all of the light bulbs in the sign's letter I. Once finished, they had to tell the employees how many bulbs they used in order to receive their next clue, which directed them to Maverick Helicopters.
- In this season's final Roadblock, the team member who did not perform the previous Roadblock had to board a helicopter and search the Las Vegas Strip for a sign at the Aria Resort and Casino that told them the name of their drop zone and location of the finish line: the Las Vegas Motor Speedway. After informing their pilot, they performed a tandem skydive 10,000 feet (3,000 m) onto the racetrack's infield, where they joined their partner and crossed the finish line.

== Reception ==
=== Critical response ===
The Amazing Race 24 received mostly negative reviews. The casting choices for this season were largely maligned with Andy Dehnart of reality blurred saying that "I couldn’t believe that these people were favorites, and collective reaction seemed to validate that." Daniel Fienberg of HitFix called this season horrible and a joke but acknowledged that he "didn't think that was an all-time bad 'Amazing Race' season. It had some good Legs and some good moments and it had a deserving winner." Reece Forward of Screen Rant wrote that this season had "a sloppy all stars cast with lackluster tasks." In 2016, this season was ranked 26th out of the first 27 seasons by the Rob Has a Podcast Amazing Race correspondents. Conversely, Richard Gorelick, Chris Waldmann, and Melissa Wilson of The Baltimore Sun wrote "All in all, it was a pretty good season, with some impressively staged tasks." Daron Aldridge of Box Office Prophets called "a very solid season and one that I enjoyable thoroughly as a viewer and recapper." In 2022, Rhenn Taguiam of Game Rant ranked this season as the third-best season. In 2024, Taguiam's ranking was updated with this season remaining as the third-best season.

=== Ratings ===
No episode aired on April 6, 2014, due to the CBS broadcast of the Academy of Country Music Awards.

U.S. Nielsen ratings

No.	Airdate	Episode	Rating/Share	Viewers	Rank	Rank	Rank	Rank
No.	Airdate	Episode	18–49	(millions)	Timeslot (Viewers)	Timeslot (18–49)	Week (Viewers)	Week (18–49)
1	February 23, 2014	"Back in the Saddle"	1.5/4	6.71	3	3	23	22
2	March 2, 2014	"Baby Bear's Soup"	1.5/4	6.10	2	2	<25	<25
3	March 9, 2014	"Welcome to the Jungle"	1.9/5	8.46	1	2	<25	<25
4	March 16, 2014	"Smarter, Not Harder"	1.8/5	8.30	1	3	24	<25
5	March 23, 2014	"Can't Make Fish Bite"	1.8/5	8.70	1	2	17	<25
6	March 30, 2014	"Down and Dirty"	2.0/5	9.51	1	2	14	24
7	April 13, 2014	"The Gladiators Are Here!"	1.8/5	8.83	1	3	22	22
8	April 20, 2014	"Donkeylicious"	1.7/5	7.65	1	1 (tie)	20	21
9	April 27, 2014	"Accidental Alliance"	1.9/6	8.45	1	2	19	16
10	May 4, 2014	"Bull Down"	1.7/5	8.09	1	3	25	<25
11	May 11, 2014	"Hei Ho Heidi Ho"	1.7/5	7.37	1	2	<25	25
12	May 18, 2014	"Do You Believe in Magic?"	1.8/5	8.22	2	2	22	24

- Episode 1, "Back in the Saddle", aired on the same night as the rebroadcast of the 2014 Winter Olympics closing ceremony.
- Episode 2, "Baby Bear's Soup", aired on the same night as the 86th Academy Awards.
- Episode 5, "Can't Make Fish Bite", was delayed by 41 minutes in the Eastern/Central market due to the 2014 NCAA Men's Division I Basketball Tournament's East Regional and Midwest Regional third round matches.
- Episode 6, "Down and Dirty", was delayed by 20 minutes in the Eastern/Central market due to the 2014 NCAA Men's Division I Basketball Tournament's East Regional Final and Midwest Regional Final matches.
- Episode 7, "The Gladiators Are Here!", was delayed by 11 minutes in the Eastern/Central market due to the final day of the 2014 Masters golf tournament.

Canadian ratings

Canadian broadcaster CTV also airs The Amazing Race on Sundays. Episodes air at 8:00 p.m. Eastern and Central (9:00 p.m. Pacific, Mountain and Atlantic), with four exceptions. The broadcast of the second episode conflicted with CTV's broadcast of the 86th Academy Awards; The Amazing Race was instead shown at 7:00 p.m. in the Atlantic time zone, at 6:00 p.m. in the Eastern time zone, and at 5:00 p.m. in the Central time zone, and immediately after the broadcast of the Oscars in the Pacific and Mountain time zones. The broadcast of the sixth episode conflicted with CTV's broadcast of the 2014 Juno Awards; The Amazing Race was instead shown at 7:00 p.m. in the Atlantic and Central time zones, at 8:00 p.m. in the Eastern and Mountain time zones, and at 9:00 p.m. in the Pacific time zone. The broadcast of the eleventh episode was rescheduled due to CTV's broadcast of the season finale of Once Upon a Time; The Amazing Race was instead shown at 8:00 p.m. in the Atlantic time zone, and at 7:00 p.m. in the rest of the country. The broadcast of the season finale conflicted with CTV's broadcast of the 2014 Billboard Music Awards; The Amazing Race was instead shown at 8:00 p.m. in the Atlantic time zone, and at 7:00 p.m. in the rest of the country.

Canadian DVR ratings are included in BBM Canada's count.

#	Airdate	Episode	Viewers (millions)	Rank (Week)
1	February 23, 2014	"Back in the Saddle"	2.34	8
2	March 2, 2014	"Baby Bear's Soup"	1.79	14
3	March 9, 2014	"Welcome to the Jungle"	2.41	3
4	March 16, 2014	"Smarter, Not Harder"	2.49	2
5	March 23, 2014	"Can't Make Fish Bite"	2.48	3
6	March 30, 2014	"Down and Dirty"	2.43	2
7	April 13, 2014	"The Gladiators Are Here!"	2.42	2
8	April 20, 2014	"Donkeylicious"	2.33	2
9	April 27, 2014	"Accidental Alliance"	2.40	2
10	May 4, 2014	"Bull Down"	2.51	2
11	May 11, 2014	"Hei Ho Heidi Ho"	1.71	16
12	May 18, 2014	"Do You Believe in Magic?"	2.12	10

- Episode 1, "Back in the Saddle", aired on the same night as the rebroadcast of the 2014 Winter Olympics closing ceremony.
- Episode 12, "Do You Believe in Magic?", aired on the Sunday before Victoria Day.
