= Millennium Elephant Foundation =

- Interactive map of Millennium Elephant Foundation
- 7°16′30″N 80°23′00″E
- Date opened: August 1999
- Location: Randeniya, Hiriwadunna, Kegalle, Sabaragamuwa, Sri Lanka
- Land area: 15 acres
- No. of animals: 9 (2014)
- No. of species: 1

Millennium Elephant Foundation (MEF) is an organization and charity set up to rescue and care for captive Asian elephants in Sri Lanka. The foundation is situated on a 15-acre estate by the name of Samaragiri, which is located 10 km (6.2 mi) northwest of Kegalle, within the Sabaragamuwa Province of Sri Lanka. As of 2019 there are 10 elephants that either permanently or temporarily reside at the sanctuary. These elephants are taken care of by 13 local mahouts and a number of foreign volunteers.

The foundation is funded predominantly by tourists and volunteer fees. This money is used to develop and improve conditions for the elephants at MEF, as well as run an education program for farmers and their families in Habarana.

== History ==
Millennium Elephant Foundation, which has been home to the Samarasinghe family and their elephants for many generations, was first opened to the public as the Club Concept Elephant Bath in 1979 by Sam Samarasinghe (1931-1991), a dedicated animal lover. After Samarasinghe's death in August 1999, MEF was founded in his memory with the assistance of the World Society for the Protection of Animals (Now known as World Animal Protection), and unveiled as a sanctuary possessing proper caretaking facilities and medical services for captive elephants. MEF strives to improve the care and treatment of Sri Lankan elephants whilst increasing awareness about the crippling conditions many of them face throughout the country. The foundation remains the only certified non-profit organization working with captive elephants in Sri Lanka today.

Tourists can observe and ride the elephants at MEF as well as assist with their daily washing in the Kuda Oya River that runs through the grounds. The funds generated from both visitors and volunteers is used to maintain the elephants well-being, and to enable the care and rescue of more captive elephants. MEF ensures that it strictly abides by the guidelines set by the Sri Lanka Tourism Development Authority.

Since its inception, MEF has cared for more than 80 elephants. As of 2014, there are nine elephants, spanning in age from 8 to 52 years, under the care of the sanctuary. Pooja, one of the resident elephants, was the first elephant in the country to be born in captivity. MEF also runs the Footsteps Elephant Consultancy, the only mahout training program to be recognized and accredited by the Sri Lankan Department of Wildlife.

== Elephant rescue ==
MEF identifies mistreated elephants and subsequently works to relocate them onto the sanctuary grounds, a process that involves paying the elephant owners a monthly wage. The organization then covers all medical, food bills, and a salary for the mahout. The elephant owners are not obligated to cover any of the costs, as many of them turn to MEF when they are no longer capable of coping with the immense expenses required by keeping an elephant. The average daily expenditure on an elephant amounts to around 7000 rupees, over $50. Many of the elephants are recovered from the logging industry, within which poor living and working conditions can cause tusk injuries, potentially resulting in breakages, nerve damage, and gum disease. The other elephants MEF rescues come from the different ways in which elephants are kept in captivity in Sri Lanka: elephants that individual people keep in their home gardens, temple-owned elephants which are often neglected when not used for religious purposes, and elephants hotels keep captive for tourism.

== Elephant care ==
As of 2014, MEF has 9 elephants and 13 mahouts. A positive and productive working relationship is sought between each elephant and it's mahout from the moment the elephant arrives at the sanctuary. Every elephant has a night bed at which it is fed in the evening and tied throughout the night. In the morning, each elephant is bathed in the river and fed its breakfast in a day bed. The food, which is delivered daily from off the premises, consists of coconut, kitul, and jackfruit bundles. Each elephant's daily consumption is counted and recorded to ensure that proper care and protocols are met.

Continuous efforts are made to ensure that each elephant's day and night beds are kept clean and proper health standards upheld. A daily veterinary check is carried out on each elephant which involves a foot sweep to check for foot rot, and the feeding of a vitamin dough ball containing all the vitamins and supplements each elephant requires. This process helps detect any medical concerns early, and if further medical attention is required, the foundation maintains a close working relationship with Dr. Ashoka Dangolla, a senior veterinarian from the University of Peradeniya. This relationship has led to the establishment of a Mobile Veterinary Unit (MVU) that provides medical services for sick and injured elephants throughout the country.

In the afternoons, the elephants take part in enrichment activities. At this time, the elephants are taken to an open area where they have the chance to search for hidden baskets of fruit and roam around on their own. This provides a period of relaxation and play for the elephants, and allows them to socialize and develop relationships with each other.

The mahouts at MEF are comfortable with and knowledgeable in traditional methods of elephant training which involve the use of pressure points known as nila points and the ankus. The ankus is used to apply strong, clear pressure in very particular points that the elephant is trained to react to. When used correctly, the ankus does not cause the elephant any pain. However, MEF is developing a mahout training program meant to shift elephant training in Sri Lanka towards methodology based on positive reinforcement. The reinforcing stimulus used with elephants is a treat awarded after the elephant has successfully completed a verbal command given by the mahout.

== Volunteer program ==
The volunteer program at MEF plays a big role in running the sanctuary. International volunteers contribute to the daily tasks involved in caring for the elephants and help to continue developing MEF as charity organization.

Volunteers each work with one elephant and its mahout(s) for the duration of their stays. Volunteers help care for their elephants by keeping track of their feeding patterns, preparing the elephant vitamin balls, completing a daily veterinary check, washing their elephant, cleaning the elephant beds, and various other tasks. The gardens at MEF, which grow food and medicinal herbs for the elephants and people living on the estate, are also maintained by the volunteers. Volunteers are also involved with various projects that help manage the sanctuary grounds, raise funds, and create awareness about the state of both captive and wild elephants in Sri Lanka.

Outside the sanctuary, volunteers get involved in the local community by teaching English to both children and adults year round.

== Conflict to Coexistence ==
In an attempt to ease the conflict between wild elephants and farmers in Sri Lanka, MEF has established a program known as Conflict to Coexistence (C2C). The project, based in the rural community near Habarana, aims to promote new farming techniques that increase crop security and educate local people on the importance of protecting wild elephants. Volunteers, along with local farmers, spend their nights in tree houses that overlook the farmlands, searching for and monitoring the wild elephant populations. As data is collected and analyzed, farmers will be able to better guard their lands from elephant damage. If elephant-related damages do occur, MEF offers compensation by helping to rebuild the damaged property and cover the cost of the lost crops. The conservation effort hopes that by educating farmers and their families, it will be able to provide them with the resources they need to defend their crops, and thus no longer view the wild elephant as a pest.

== Long term goals ==
MEF has many longer term objectives it is progressing towards, the most noticeable being a project known as the Freedom Fence Enclosure. MEF is currently working on an enclosure around the estate that will give the elephants 325,100 feet of free roaming area. This will provide them with a natural habitat in which they will be able to socialize amongst themselves. The fence is to be constructed of steel and concrete and one hot wire.

MEF is also attempting to train elephants using positive reinforcement methods that differ from the traditional Sri Lankan training system. If successful, MEF hopes to spread this type of training throughout the country and encourage its use.

== See also ==
- Sri Lankan Elephant
- Pinnawala Elephant Orphanage
- Udawalawe Elephant Transit Home
