= Plaza de América =

Square in Seville, Spain

Coordinates: 37.3716°N 5.9874°W

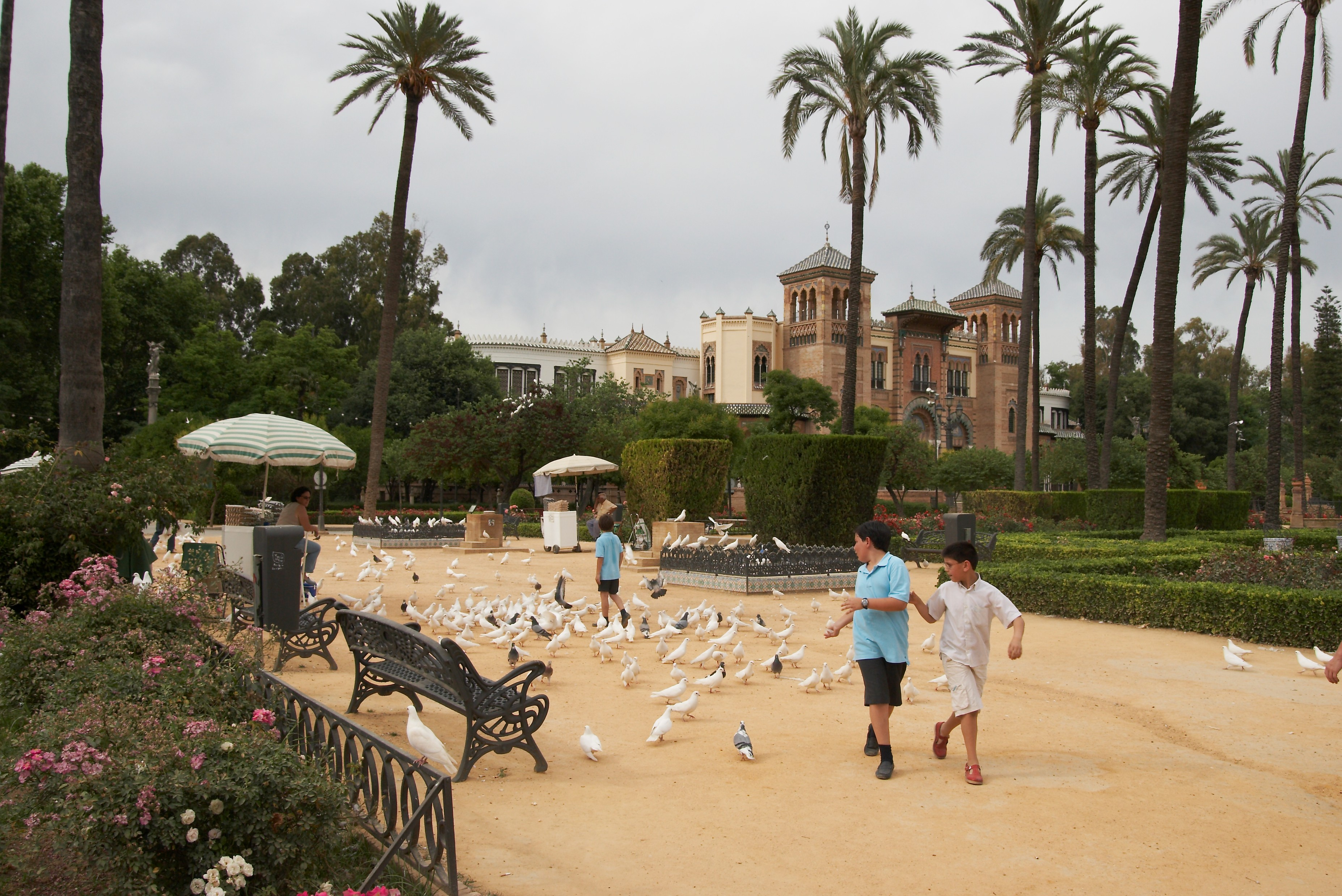
Plaza de América at daytime

The Plaza de América (Seville, Spain), located in the Parque de María Luisa, was built by architect Aníbal González for the Ibero-American exhibition of 1929. The Plaza is flanked by three buildings, also built by González for the exhibition, in three distinct architectural styles: the Museum of Popular Arts (Neomudéjar), the Archaeological Museum (Neo-Renaissance), and the Royal Pavilion (Gothic).

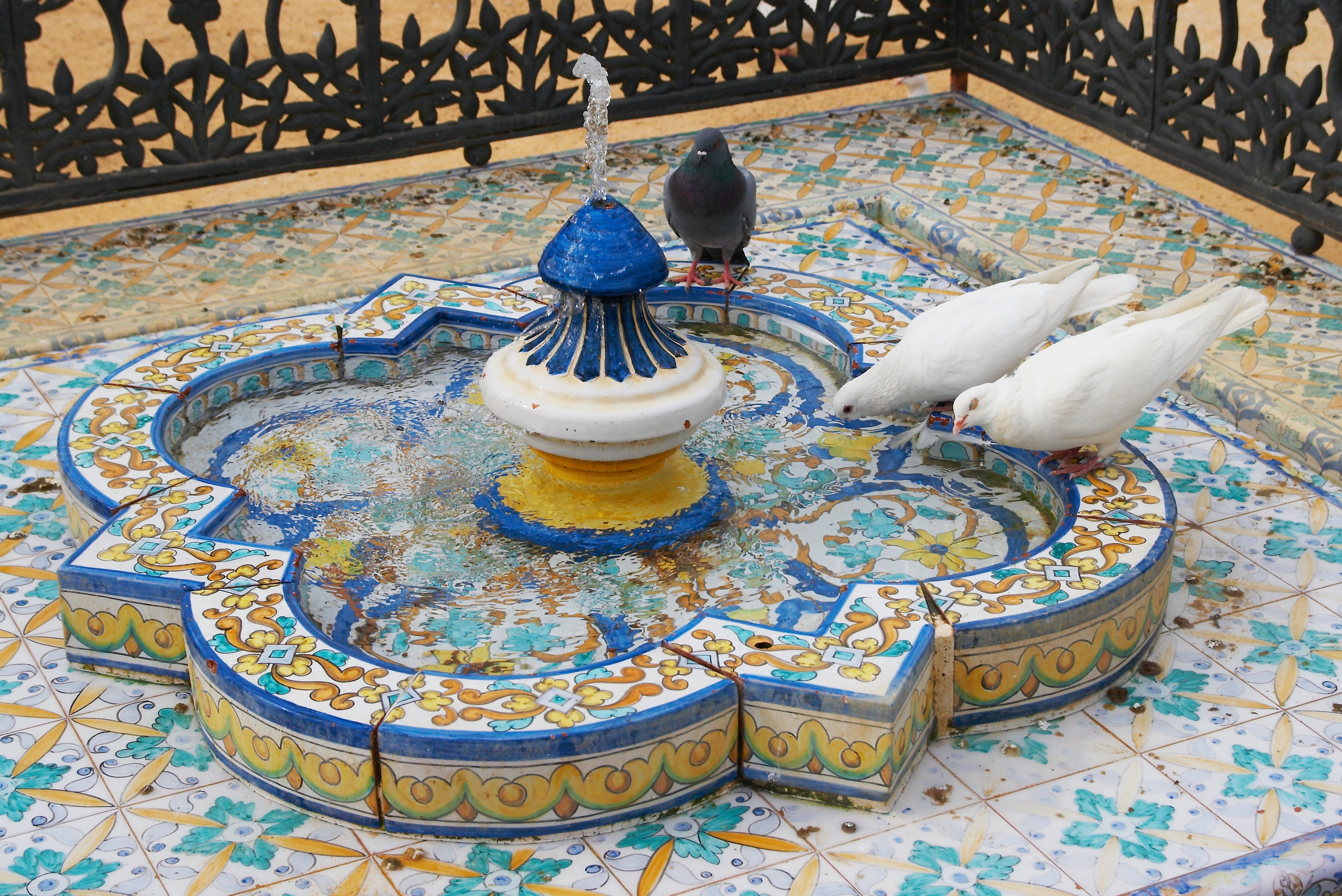
Pigeons drinking at a source

== Filming locations ==
The site has served as a filming location for several notable productions. Scenes from the 1975 film The Wind and the Lion were shot here. Additionally, the episode "Mou Mou" (2022) from the fifth season of the Netflix series The Crown also featured scenes filmed at this location.

== Buildings and roundabouts in the Plaza de América ==
- Royal pavilion
- Roundabout of Cervantes
- Roundabout of Rodriguez Marín
- Museum of Popular Arts ( Mudéjar Pavilion )
- Archaeological Museum
- Source of the Doves
- Mural Glorieta de la Mesa
- Roundabout Clock
- Roundabout of Virgen de los Reyes
