= List of The Amazing Race (American TV series) contestants =

This is a list of contestants who have appeared on the American television series, The Amazing Race. Contestants, who typically have a pre-existing relationship, form a team and race around the world against other teams to claim a grand prize of 1 million USD. The original American series premiered in 2001. In total, 779 contestants have appeared in the series, with veteran contestants having competed on The Amazing Race 11: All-Stars in 2007, on The Amazing Race 18: Unfinished Business, on The Amazing Race 24: All-Stars and on The Amazing Race 31 (which featured teams of contestants who had previously competed on Big Brother, The Amazing Race, and Survivor). The eighth season, The Amazing Race 8: Family Edition, featured 10 teams of four family members, while The Amazing Race 29 featured 22 contestants who were all complete strangers.

== Seasons 1–4 (2001–2003) ==
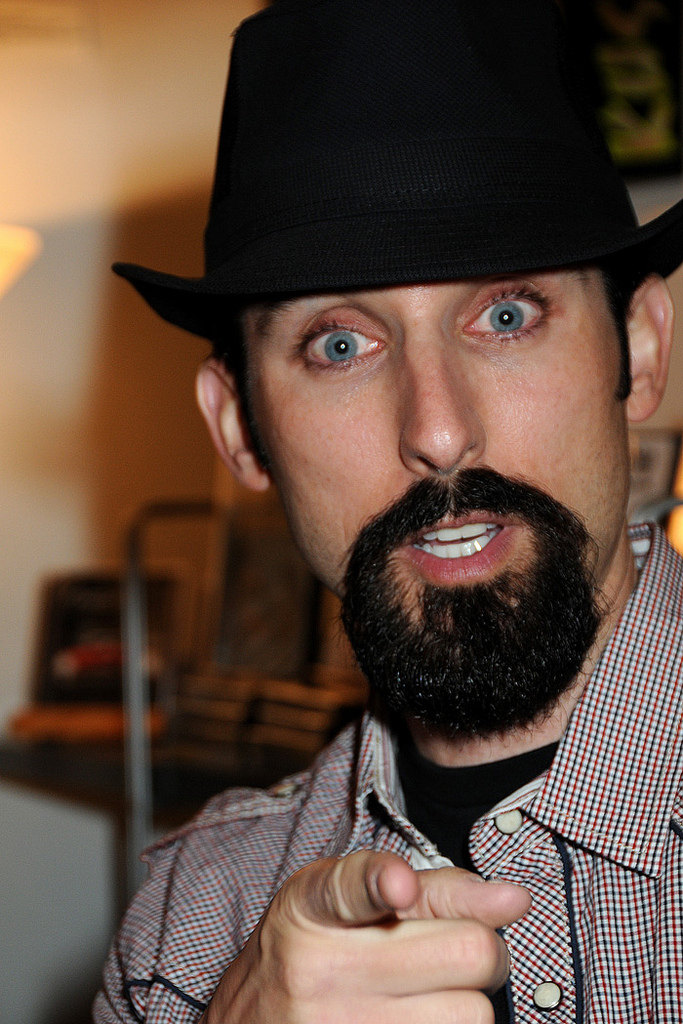
Paul Alessi, The Amazing Race 1

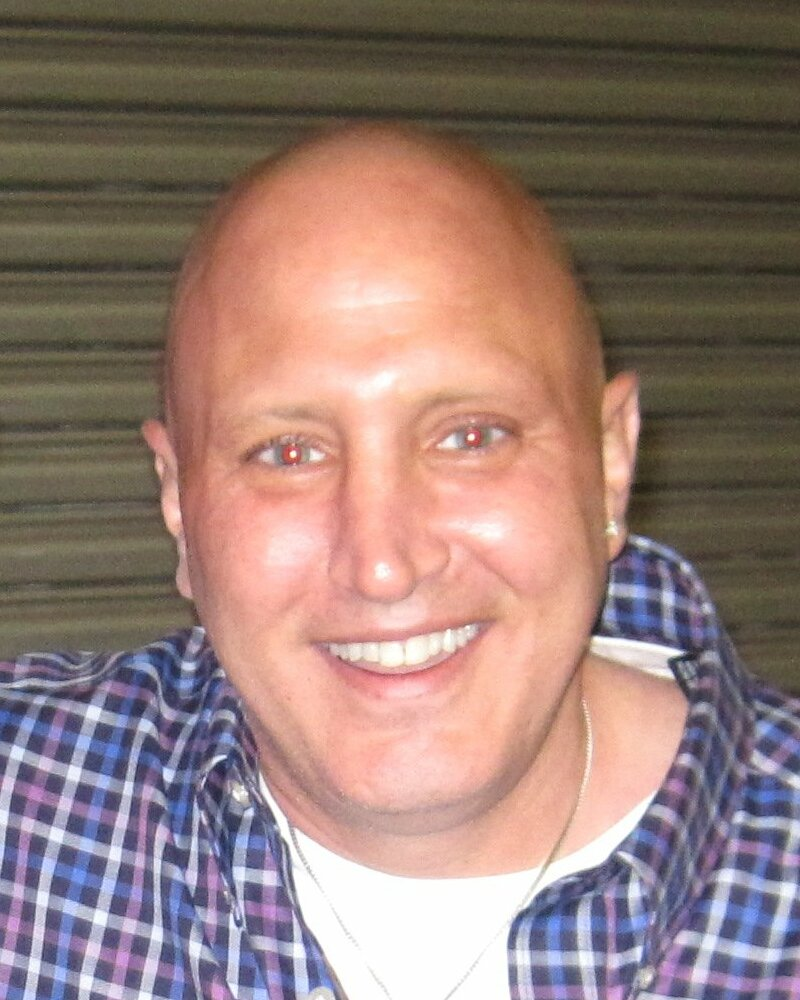
Drew Feinberg, The Amazing Race 1 and The Amazing Race 11: All-Stars

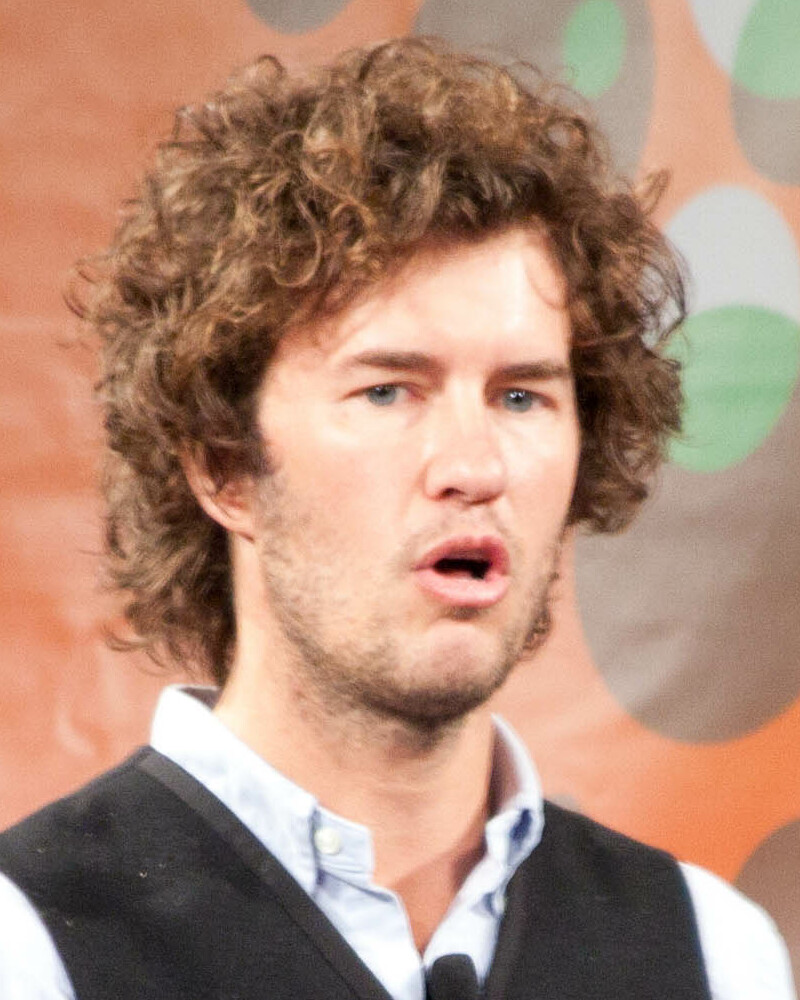
Blake Mycoskie, The Amazing Race 2

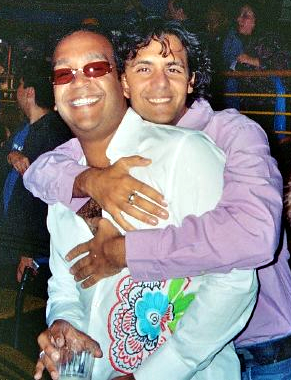
Oswald Mendez (right) and Danny Jimenez (left), The Amazing Race 2 and The Amazing Race 11: All-Stars

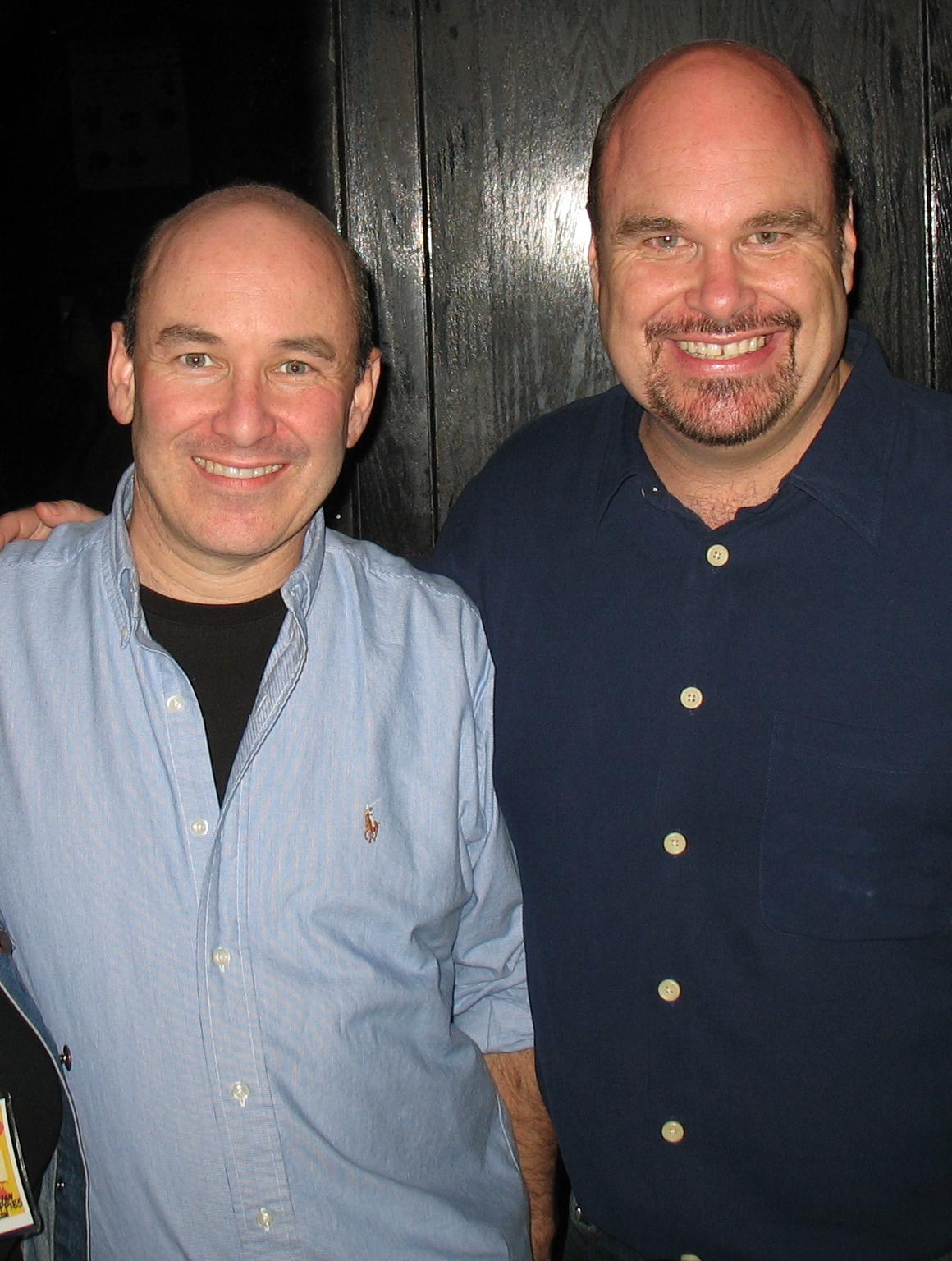
Ken Duphiney (right) and Gerard Duphiney (left), The Amazing Race 3

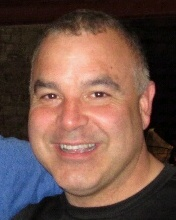
Al Rios, The Amazing Race 4

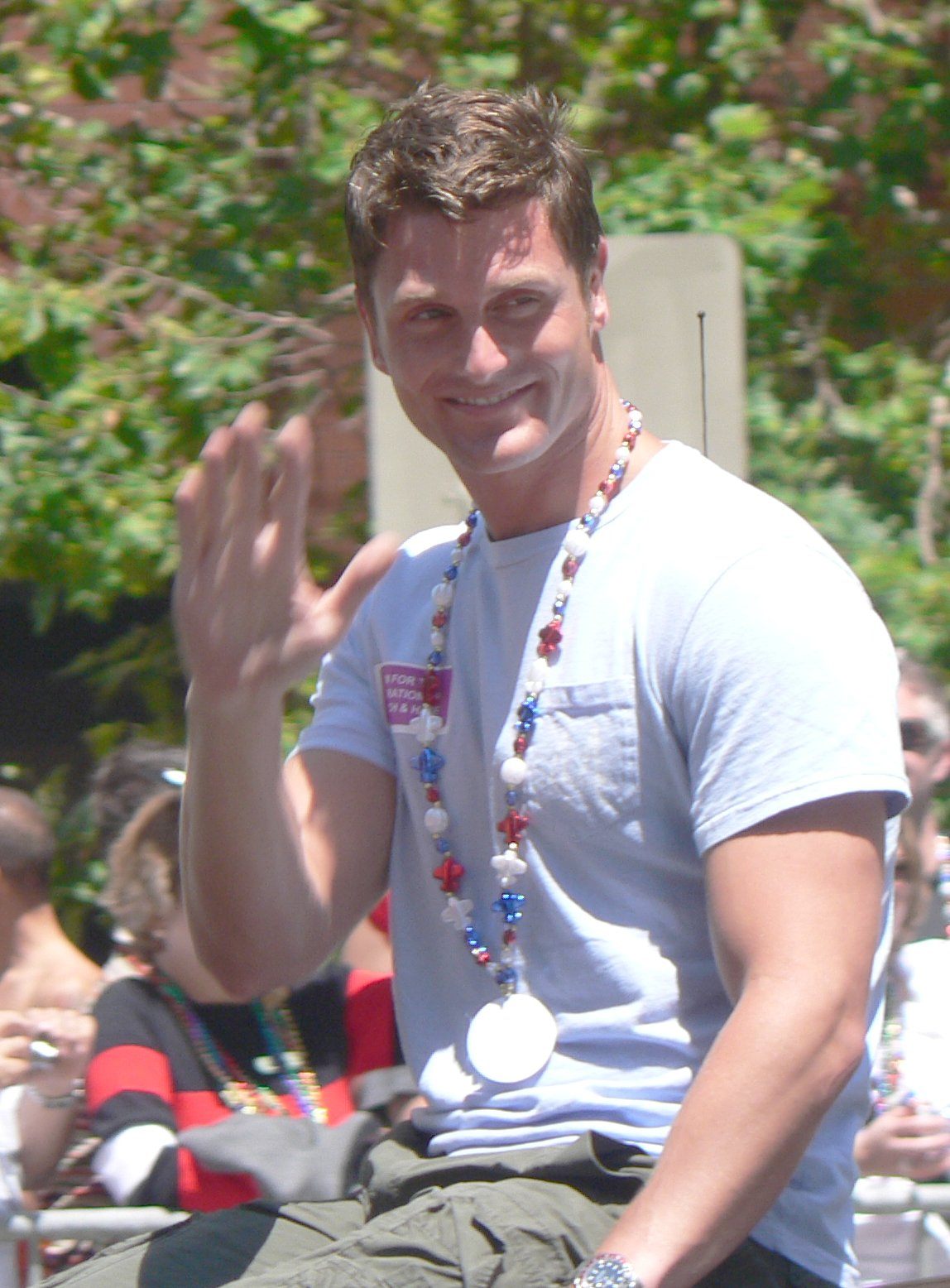
Reichen Lehmkuhl, The Amazing Race 4

This information was accurate at the time of filming.

Name	Age	Hometown	Season	Finish
Matt Robar	28	Simsbury, Connecticut	Season 1	11th
Ana Robar	28	Simsbury, Connecticut	Season 1	11th
Kim Smith	28	Baytown, Texas	Season 1	10th
Leslie Kellner	27	Baytown, Texas	Season 1	10th
Pat Pierce	43	Landenberg, Pennsylvania	Season 1	9th
Brenda Mehta	42	Elkton, Maryland	Season 1	9th
Dave Groark	65	Rockwall, Texas	Season 1	8th
Margaretta Groark	60	Rockwall, Texas	Season 1	8th
Paul Alessi	32	Los Angeles, California	Season 1	7th
Amie Barsky	27	Los Angeles, California	Season 1	7th
Lenny Hudson	33	New York, New York	Season 1	6th
Karyn Jefferson	30	New York, New York	Season 1	6th
Nancy Hoyt	46	Waco, Texas	Season 1	5th
Emily Hoyt	21	Waco, Texas	Season 1	5th
Kevin O'Connor	34	Bayonne, New Jersey	Season 1	4th
Drew Feinberg	35	Staten Island, New York	Season 1	4th
Joe Baldassare	50	Laguna Niguel, California	Season 1	3rd
Bill Bartek	47	Laguna Niguel, California	Season 1	3rd
Frank Mesa	30	Queens, New York	Season 1	2nd
Margarita Mesa	28	Queens, New York	Season 1	2nd
Rob Frisbee	27	Minneapolis, Minnesota	Season 1	1st
Brennan Swain	29	Rochester, New York	Season 1	1st
Deidre Washington	51	Miami, Florida	Season 2	11th
Hillary Washington	23	Brooklyn, New York	Season 2	11th
Hope Davis	38	Clinton, Tennessee	Season 2	10th
Norm Davis	39	Clinton, Tennessee	Season 2	10th
Peggy Kuhn	63	Truckee, California	Season 2	9th
Claire Jinks	65	Los Gatos, California	Season 2	9th
Shola Richards	27	Albany, New York	Season 2	8th
Doyin Richards	27	Albany, New York	Season 2	8th
Cyndi Kalenberg	45	Brainerd, Minnesota	Season 2	7th
Russell Kalenberg	46	Brainerd, Minnesota	Season 2	7th
Mary Lenig	38	Sunbury, Pennsylvania	Season 2	6th
Peach Krebs	33	Paxinos, Pennsylvania	Season 2	6th
Gary Rosen	33	New York, New York	Season 2	5th
Dave Lepeska	28	Brooklyn, New York	Season 2	5th
Oswald Mendez	31	Miami, Florida	Season 2	4th
Danny Jimenez	36	Miami, Florida	Season 2	4th
Blake Mycoskie	25	Nashville, Tennessee	Season 2	3rd
Paige Mycoskie	21	Arlington, Texas	Season 2	3rd
Tara Lynch	31	Los Angeles, California	Season 2	2nd
Wil Steger	37	Los Angeles, California	Season 2	2nd
Chris Luca	25	Boston, Massachusetts	Season 2	1st
Alex Boylan	24	Boston, Massachusetts	Season 2	1st
Gina Diggins	35	Hilton Head Island, South Carolina	Season 3	12th
Sylvia Pitts	34	Hilton Head Island, South Carolina	Season 3	12th
Tramel Raggs	22	Gary, Indiana	Season 3	11th
Talicia Raggs	29	Los Angeles, California	Season 3	11th
Dennis Hyde	48	Lexington, Kentucky	Season 3	10th
Andrew Hyde	21	Lexington, Kentucky	Season 3	10th
Heather Mahar	25	Boston, Massachusetts	Season 3	9th
Eve Madison	25	New York, New York	Season 3	9th
Michael Ilacqua	28	San Diego, California	Season 3	8th
Kathy Perez	31	Birmingham, Michigan	Season 3	8th
Aaron Goldschmidt	27	New York, New York	Season 3	7th
Arianne Udell	27	New York, New York	Season 3	7th
Andre Plummer	32	Los Angeles, California	Season 3	6th
Damon Wafer	33	Long Beach, California	Season 3	6th
John Vito Pietanza	28	Staten Island, New York	Season 3	5th
Jill Aquilino	24	Manhattan, New York	Season 3	5th
Derek Riker	32	Los Angeles, California	Season 3	4th
Drew Riker	32	Los Angeles, California	Season 3	4th
Ken Duphiney	40	New York, New York	Season 3	3rd
Gerard Duphiney	35	Denville, New Jersey	Season 3	3rd
Teri Pollack	49	Palm City, Florida	Season 3	2nd
Ian Pollack	50	Palm City, Florida	Season 3	2nd
Flo Pesenti	23	New York, New York	Season 3	1st
Zach Behr	23	New York, New York	Season 3	1st
Debra Carmody	49	Louisville, Kentucky	Season 4	12th
Steve Carmody	40	Louisville, Kentucky	Season 4	12th
Amanda Adams	25	Sioux Falls, South Dakota	Season 4	11th
Chris Garry	28	Sioux Falls, South Dakota	Season 4	11th
Russell Brown	32	Hermosa Beach, California	Season 4	10th
Cindy Duck	39	Los Angeles, California	Season 4	10th
Steve Cottingham	47	Santa Barbara, California	Season 4	9th
Josh Cottingham	21	Los Angeles, California	Season 4	9th
Steve Meitz	46	Chicago, Illinois	Season 4	8th
Dave Cottingham	43	Chicago, Illinois	Season 4	8th
Monica Ambrose	29	Duluth, Georgia	Season 4	7th
Sheree Buchanan	31	Duluth, Georgia	Season 4	7th
Tian Kitchen	30	Miami, Florida	Season 4	6th
Jaree Poteet	33	Miami, Florida	Season 4	6th
Millie Smith	29	Chattanooga, Tennessee	Season 4	5th
Chuck Shankles	28	Chattanooga, Tennessee	Season 4	5th
Jon Weiss	40	Long Island, New York	Season 4	4th
Al Rios	34	Long Island, New York	Season 4	4th
David Dean	32	Los Angeles, California	Season 4	3rd
Jeff Strnad	37	Los Angeles, California	Season 4	3rd
Kelly Parks	30	Miami, Florida	Season 4	2nd
Jon Corso	28	Miami, Florida	Season 4	2nd
Reichen Lehmkuhl	28	Los Angeles, California	Season 4	1st
Chip Arndt	36	Los Angeles, California	Season 4	1st

== Seasons 5–8 (2004–2005) ==
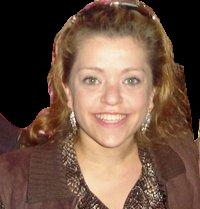
Charla Baklayan Faddoul, The Amazing Race 5 and The Amazing Race 11: All-Stars

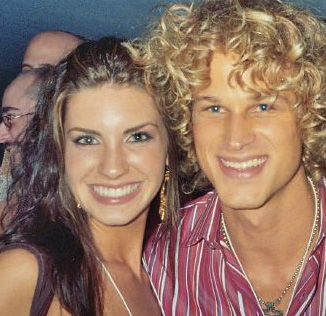
Brandon Davidson (right) and Nicole O'Brian (left), The Amazing Race 5

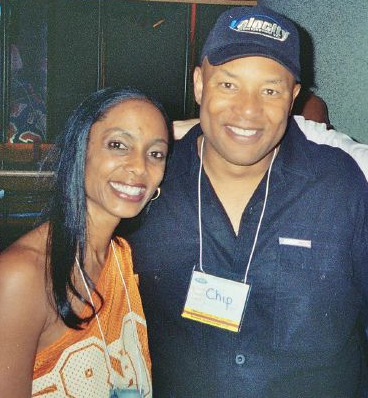
Chip McAllister (right) and Kim McAllister (left), The Amazing Race 5

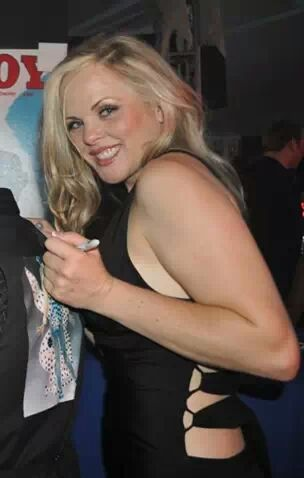
Victoria Fuller, The Amazing Race 6

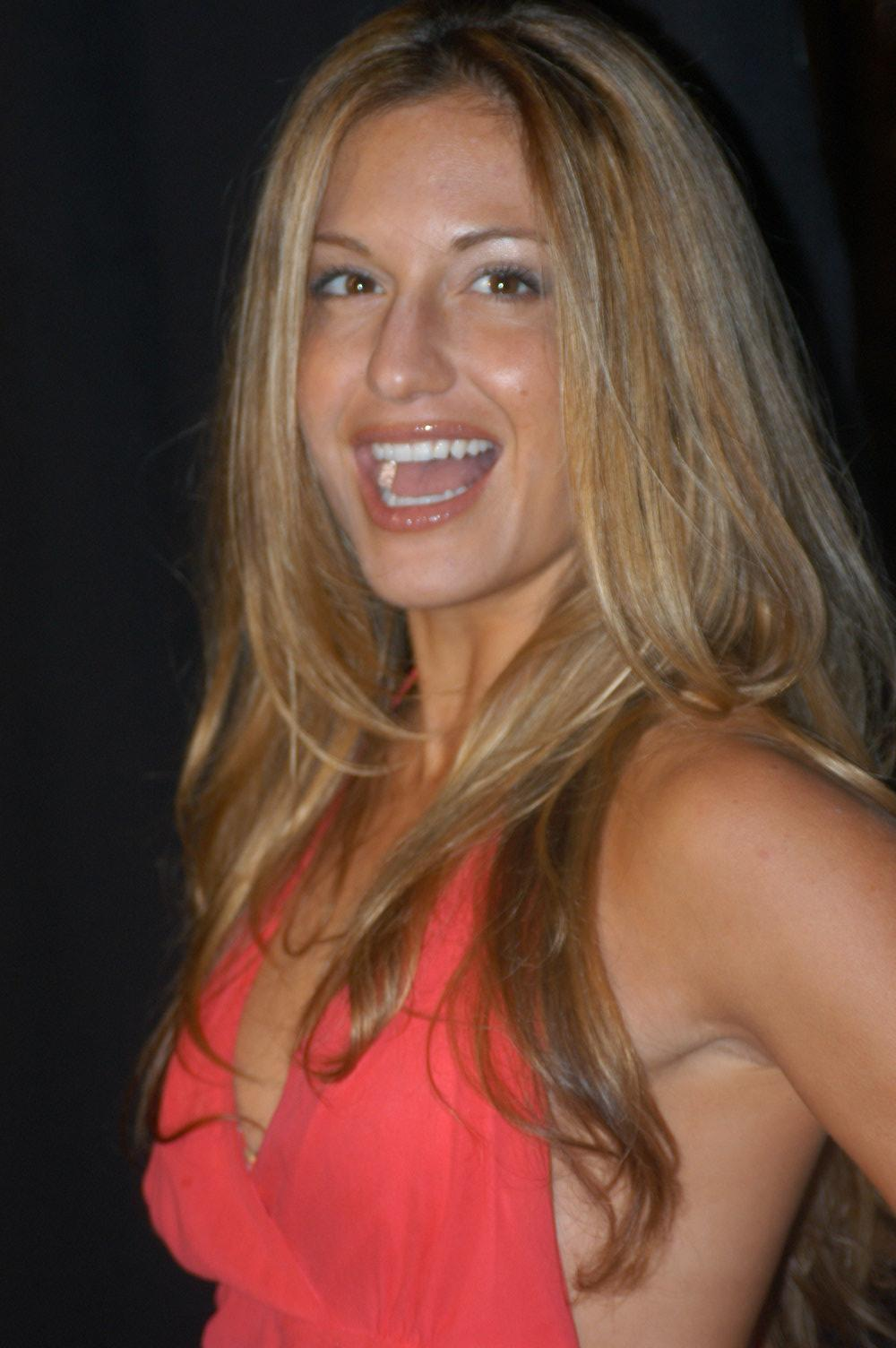
Rebecca Cardon, The Amazing Race 6

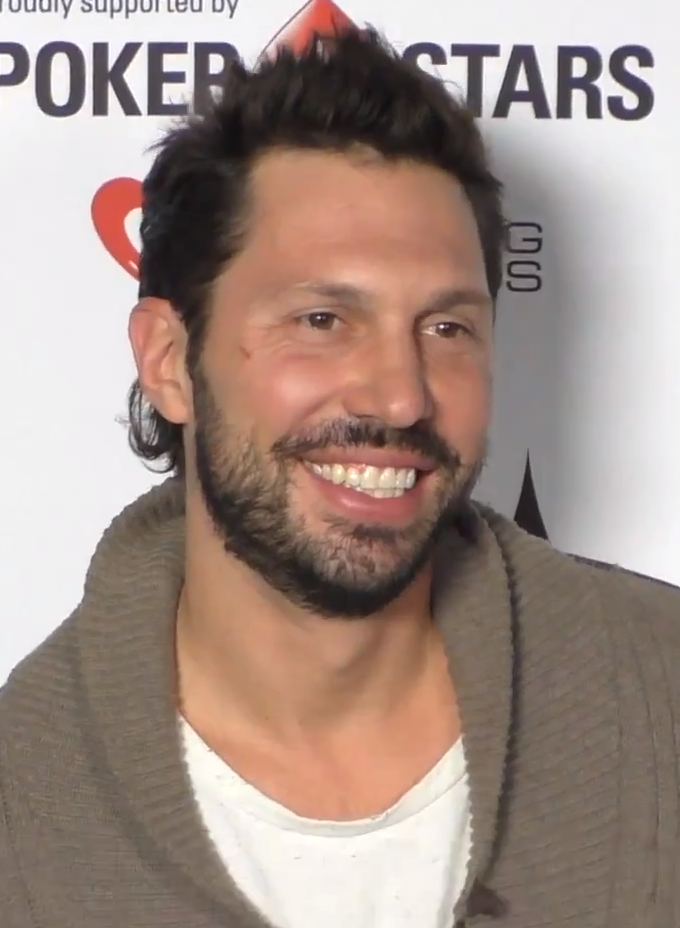
Brian Thomas Smith, The Amazing Race 7

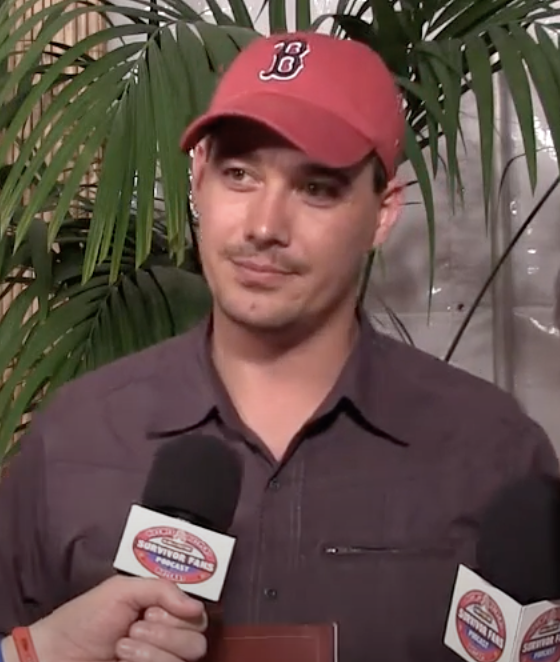
Rob Mariano, The Amazing Race 7 and The Amazing Race 11: All-Stars

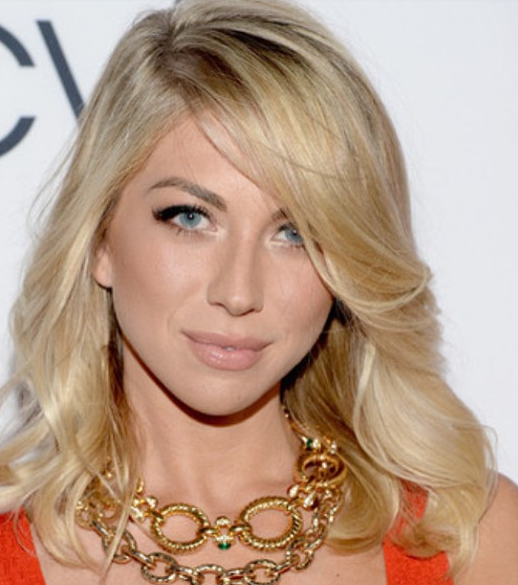
Stassi Schroeder, The Amazing Race 8: Family Edition

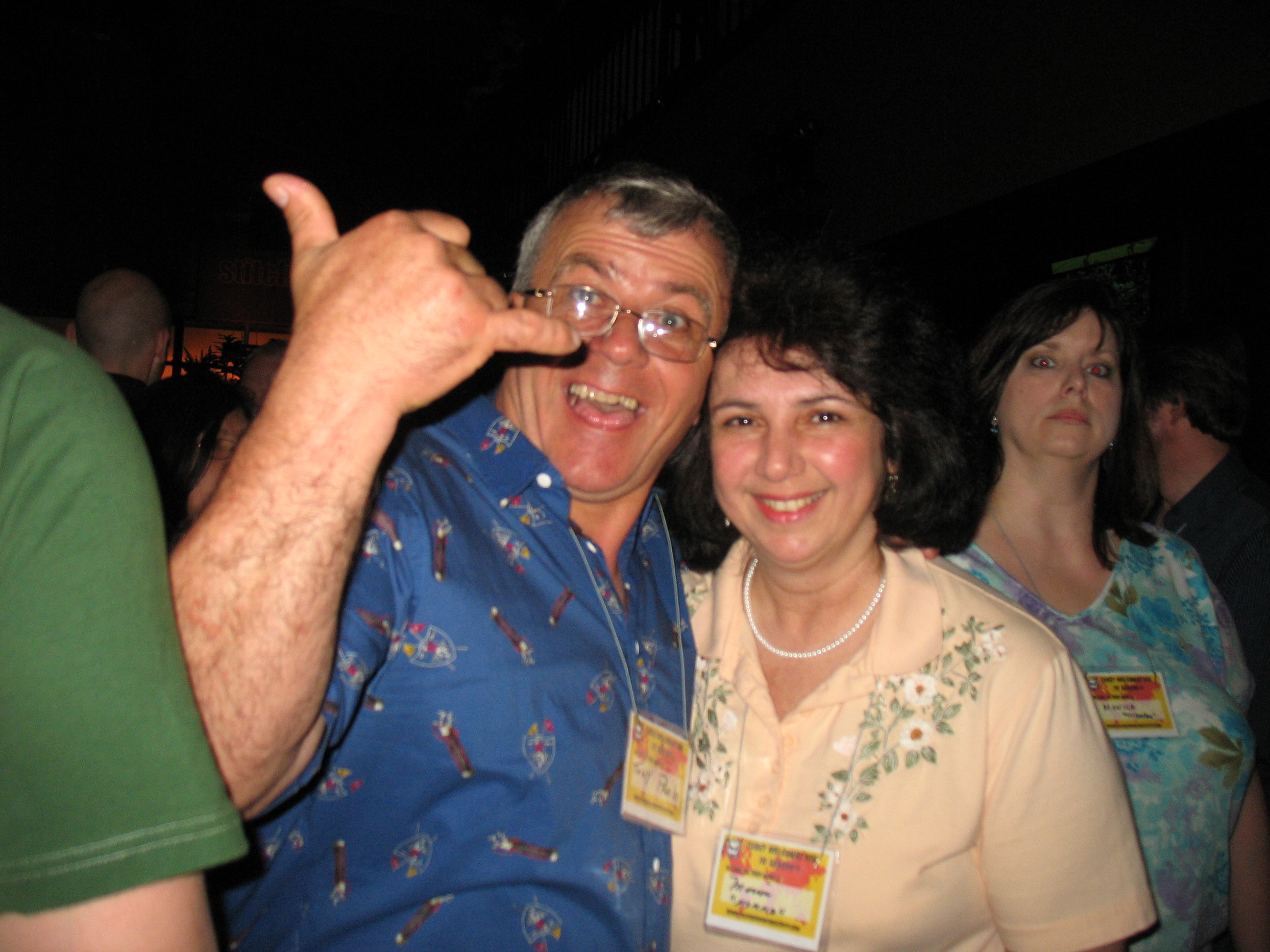
Tony and Marion Paolo, The Amazing Race 8: Family Edition

This information was accurate at the time of filming.

Name	Age	Hometown	Season	Finish
Dennis Frentsos	27	West Nyack, New York	Season 5	11th
Erika Shay	25	Piermont, New York	Season 5	11th
Alison Irwin	23	Meadville, Pennsylvania	Season 5	10th
Donny Patrick	21	Shenandoah, Pennsylvania	Season 5	10th
Jim McCoy	53	Jacksonville, Florida	Season 5	9th
Marsha McCoy	26	Gainesville, Florida	Season 5	9th
Bob Barron	61	Mount Laurel, New Jersey	Season 5	8th
Joyce Nicolo	54	Mount Laurel, New Jersey	Season 5	8th
Marshall Hudes	31	Dallas, Texas	Season 5	7th
Lance Hudes	26	Dallas, Texas	Season 5	7th
Charla Baklayan Faddoul	27	Phoenix, Maryland	Season 5	6th
Mirna Hindoyan	27	Towson, Maryland	Season 5	6th
Kami French	26	Eugene, Oregon	Season 5	5th
Karli French	26	Eugene, Oregon	Season 5	5th
Linda Ruiz	45	Palmdale, California	Season 5	4th
Karen Heins	41	Palmdale, California	Season 5	4th
Brandon Davidson	25	Los Angeles, California	Season 5	3rd
Nicole O'Brian	21	Los Angeles, California	Season 5	3rd
Colin Guinn	24	Corpus Christi, Texas	Season 5	2nd
Christie Lee Woods	26	Corpus Christi, Texas	Season 5	2nd
Chip McAllister	46	Coto de Caza, California	Season 5	1st
Kim McAllister	44	Coto de Caza, California	Season 5	1st
Avi Schneier	32	Brooklyn, New York	Season 6	11th
Joe Rashbaum	32	Ventura, California	Season 6	11th
Meredith Tufaro	26	Queens, New York	Season 6	10th
Maria Sampogna	26	Queens, New York	Season 6	10th
Lena Jensen	23	Pleasant Grove, Utah	Season 6	9th
Kristy Jensen	26	Pleasant Grove, Utah	Season 6	9th
Don St. Claire	69	Portola Valley, California	Season 6	8th
Mary Jean St. Claire	66	Portola Valley, California	Season 6	8th
Gus McLeod	50	Gaithersburg, Maryland	Season 6	7th
Hera McLeod	24	Los Angeles, California	Season 6	7th
Jonathan Baker	42	Los Angeles, California	Season 6	6th
Victoria Fuller	32	Los Angeles, California	Season 6	6th
Lori Harvey	33	Molino, Florida	Season 6	5th
Bolo Dar'tainian	38	Molino, Florida	Season 6	5th
Hayden Kristianson	25	Chicago, Illinois	Season 6	4th
Aaron Crumbaugh	25	Chicago, Illinois	Season 6	4th
Adam Malis	27	Los Angeles, California	Season 6	3rd
Rebecca Cardon	29	Los Angeles, California	Season 6	3rd
Kris Perkins	30	Long Beach, California	Season 6	2nd
Jon Buehler	29	Scottsdale, Arizona	Season 6	2nd
Freddy Holliday	34	Miami, Florida	Season 6	1st
Kendra Bentley	25	Miami, Florida	Season 6	1st
Ryan Phillips	31	Landrum, South Carolina	Season 7	11th
Chuck Horton	32	Inman, South Carolina	Season 7	11th
Megan Baker	26	Oak Park, California	Season 7	10th
Heidi Heidel	31	Oak Park, California	Season 7	10th
Debbie Cloyed	25	Woodbridge, Virginia	Season 7	9th
Bianca Smith	26	Woodbridge, Virginia	Season 7	9th
Susan Vaughn	54	Hamilton, Ohio	Season 7	8th
Patrick Vaughn	26	Hamilton, Ohio	Season 7	8th
Ray Hosteau	44	Canfield, Ohio	Season 7	7th
Deana Shane	27	Youngstown, Ohio	Season 7	7th
Brian Smith	27	Santa Monica, California	Season 7	6th
Greg Smith	24	Santa Monica, California	Season 7	6th
Lynn Warren	30	West Hollywood, California	Season 7	5th
Alex Ali	22	West Hollywood, California	Season 7	5th
Meredith Smith	69	Easton, Maryland	Season 7	4th
Gretchen Smith	66	Easton, Maryland	Season 7	4th
Ron Young Jr.	28	Villa Rica, Georgia	Season 7	3rd
Kelly McCorkle	26	Greenville, South Carolina	Season 7	3rd
Rob Mariano	29	Canton, Massachusetts	Season 7	2nd
Amber Brkich	26	Beaver, Pennsylvania	Season 7	2nd
Uchenna Agu	40	Houston, Texas	Season 7	1st
Joyce Agu	44	Houston, Texas	Season 7	1st
Reggie Black	42	Woodbridge, Virginia	Season 8	10th
Kimberly Black	40	Woodbridge, Virginia	Season 8	10th
Kenneth Black	11	Woodbridge, Virginia	Season 8	10th
Austin Black	8	Woodbridge, Virginia	Season 8	10th
Denny Rogers	46	Shreveport, Louisiana	Season 8	9th
Renee Rogers	42	Shreveport, Louisiana	Season 8	9th
Brittney Rogers	22	Shreveport, Louisiana	Season 8	9th
Brock Rogers	19	Shreveport, Louisiana	Season 8	9th
Tony Aiello	57	Mansfield, Massachusetts	Season 8	8th
Kevin Kempskie	31	Mansfield, Massachusetts	Season 8	8th
Matt Hanson	31	Mansfield, Massachusetts	Season 8	8th
David Alverson	26	Mansfield, Massachusetts	Season 8	8th
Mark Schroeder	40	New Orleans, Louisiana	Season 8	7th
Char Schroeder	39	New Orleans, Louisiana	Season 8	7th
Stassi Schroeder	17	New Orleans, Louisiana	Season 8	7th
Hunter Schroeder	15	New Orleans, Louisiana	Season 8	7th
Bill Gaghan	40	Glastonbury, Connecticut	Season 8	6th
Tammy Gaghan	42	Glastonbury, Connecticut	Season 8	6th
Billy Gaghan	12	Glastonbury, Connecticut	Season 8	6th
Carissa Gaghan	9	Glastonbury, Connecticut	Season 8	6th
Tony Paolo	52	Carmel, New York	Season 8	5th
Marion Paolo	52	Carmel, New York	Season 8	5th
D.J. Paolo	24	Carmel, New York	Season 8	5th
Brian Paolo	16	Carmel, New York	Season 8	5th
Michelle Godlewski	42	Des Plaines, Illinois	Season 8	4th
Sharon Godlewski	39	Des Plaines, Illinois	Season 8	4th
Christine Godlewski	37	Des Plaines, Illinois	Season 8	4th
Tricia Godlewski	26	Des Plaines, Illinois	Season 8	4th
Linda Weaver	46	Ormond Beach, Florida	Season 8	3rd
Rebecca Weaver	19	Ormond Beach, Florida	Season 8	3rd
Rachel Weaver	16	Ormond Beach, Florida	Season 8	3rd
Rolly Weaver IV	14	Ormond Beach, Florida	Season 8	3rd
Wally Bransen	51	Park Ridge, Illinois	Season 8	2nd
Beth Bransen	25	Park Ridge, Illinois	Season 8	2nd
Lauren Bransen	22	Park Ridge, Illinois	Season 8	2nd
Lindsay Bransen	20	Park Ridge, Illinois	Season 8	2nd
Nick Linz	24	Cincinnati, Ohio	Season 8	1st
Alex Linz	22	Cincinnati, Ohio	Season 8	1st
Megan Linz	21	Cincinnati, Ohio	Season 8	1st
Tommy Linz	19	Cincinnati, Ohio	Season 8	1st

== Seasons 9–12 (2006–2007) ==
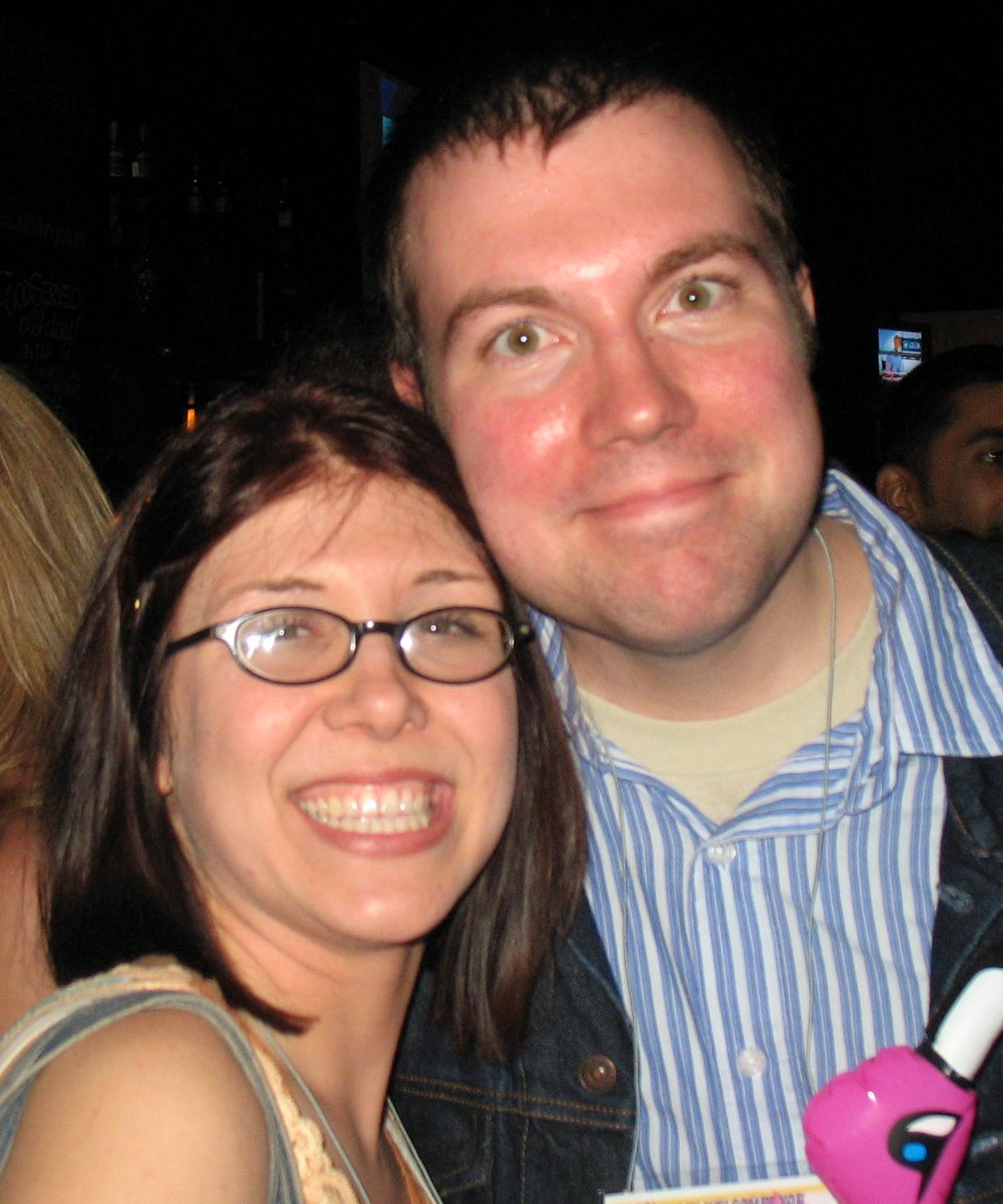
David "Dave" Spiker (right) and Lori Willems (left), The Amazing Race 9

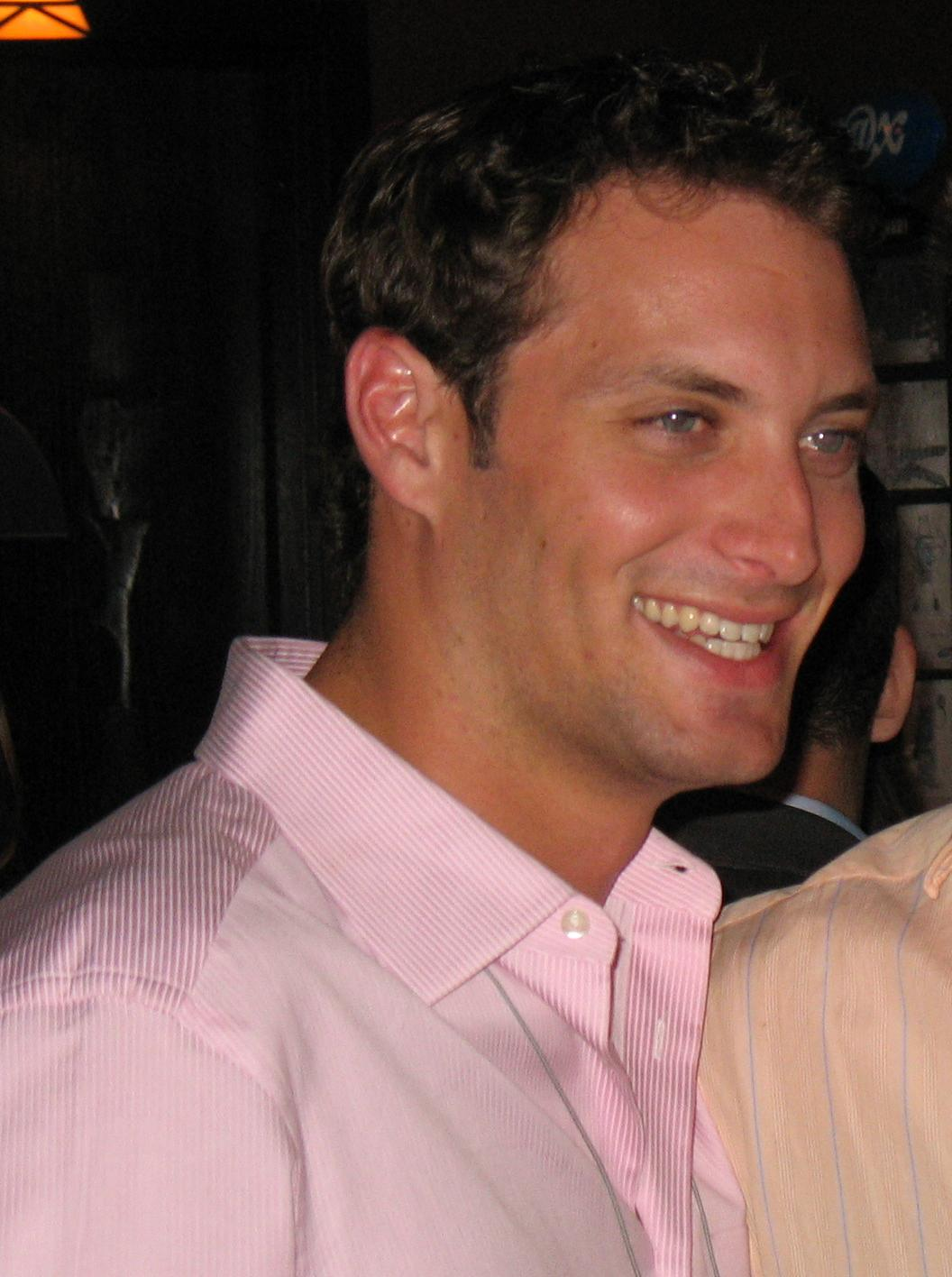
Joseph Meadows, The Amazing Race 9

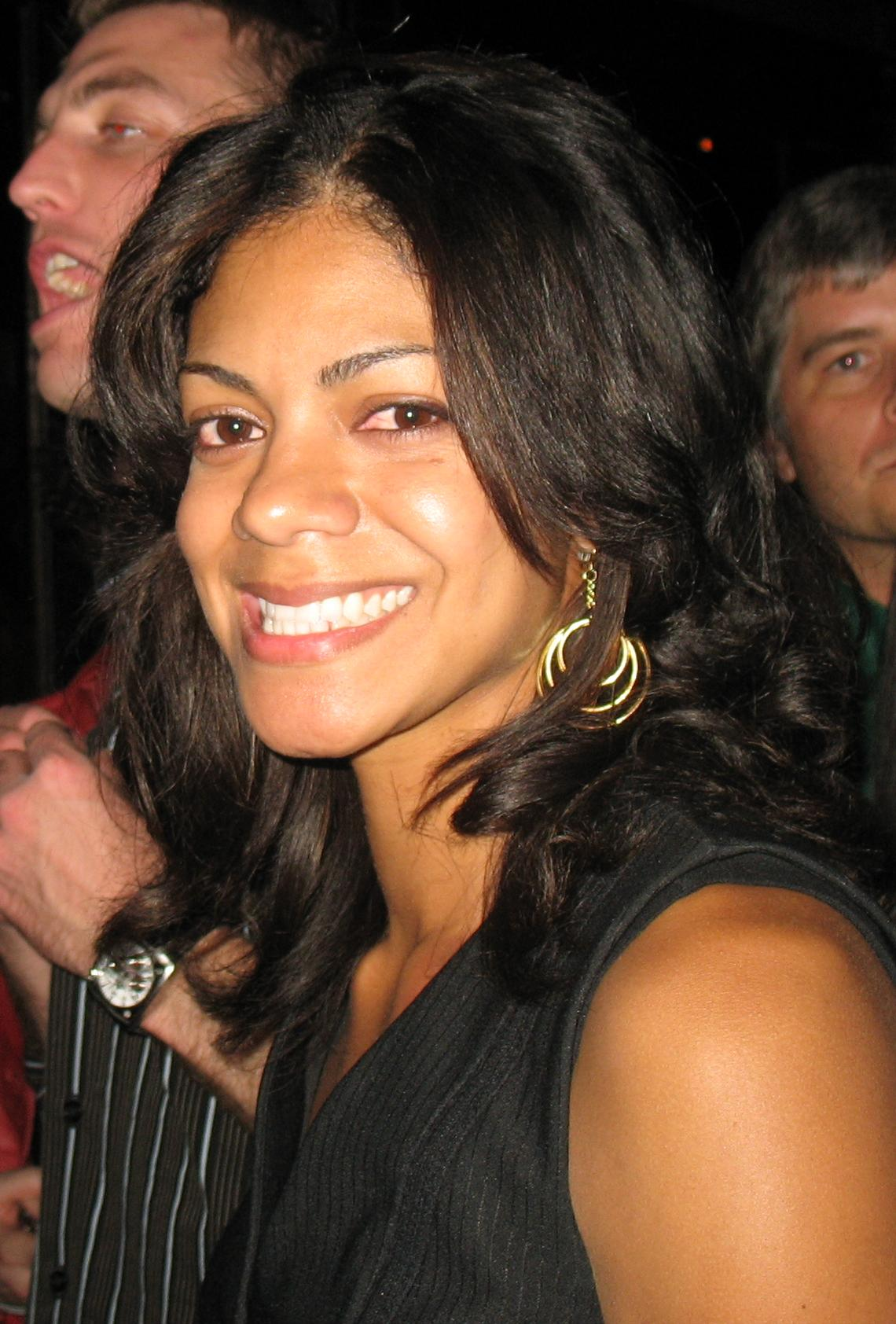
Yolanda Brown-Moore, The Amazing Race 9

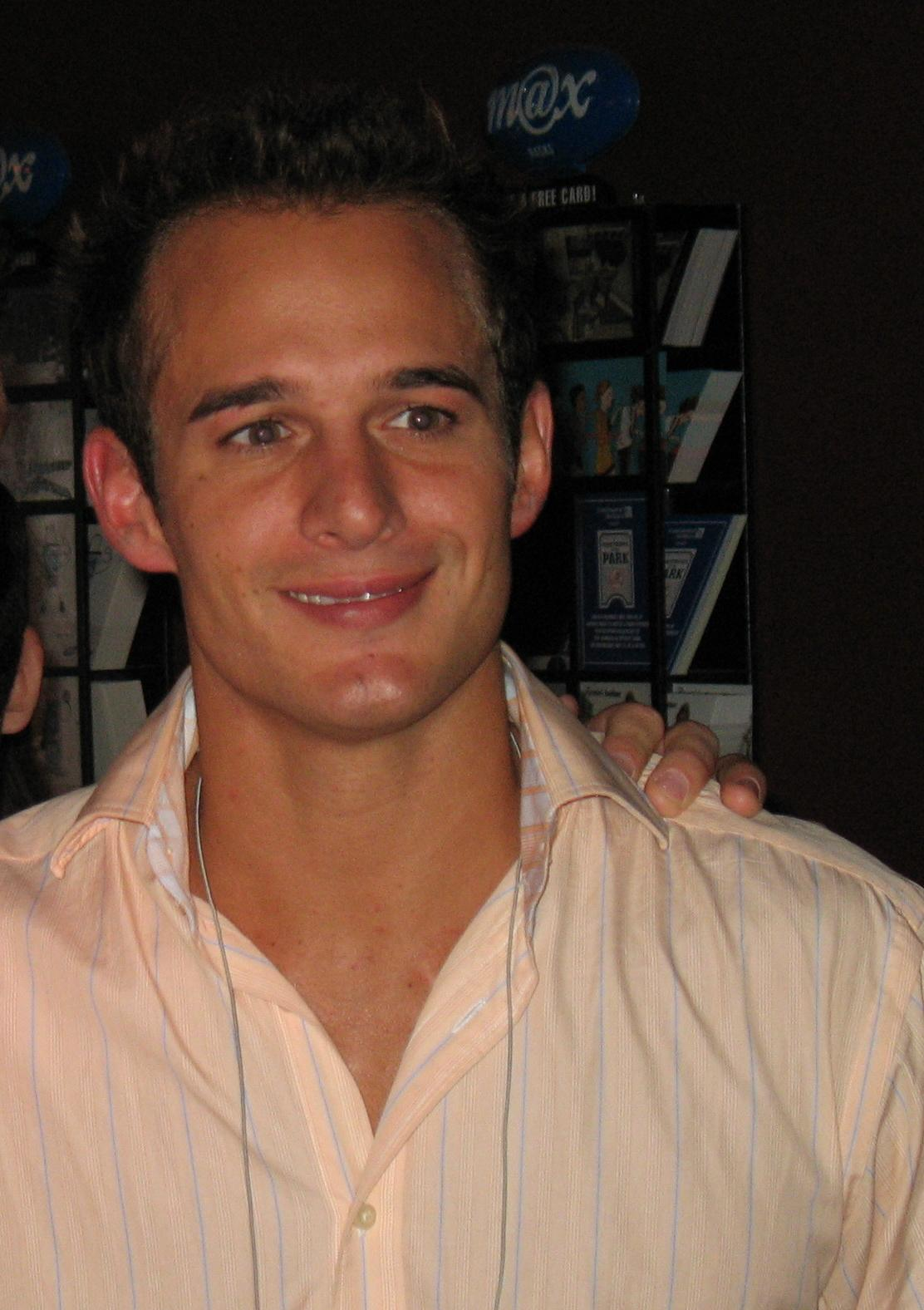
Eric Sanchez, The Amazing Race 9 and The Amazing Race 11: All-Stars

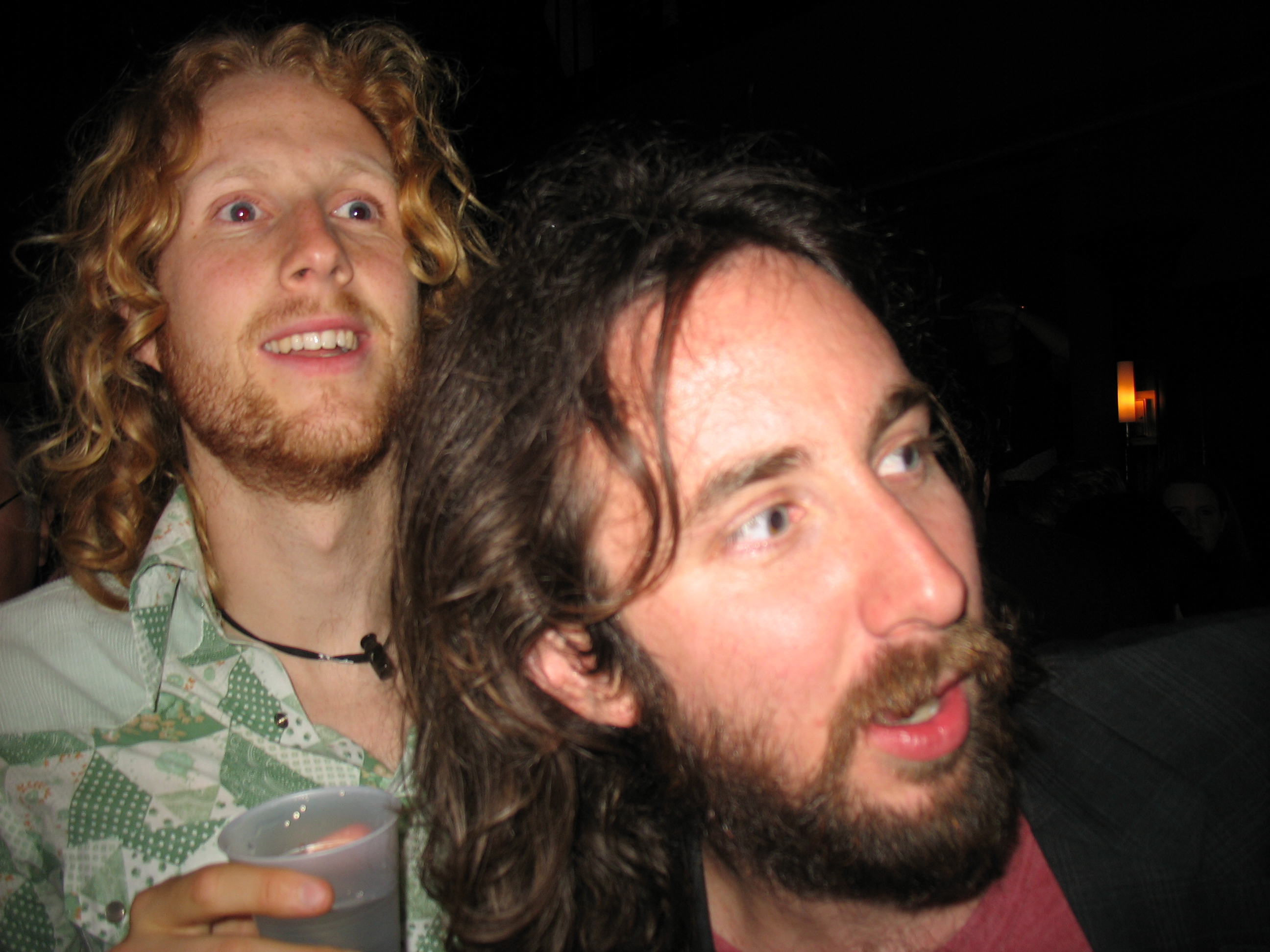
B.J. Averell (right) and Tyler MacNiven (left), The Amazing Race 9

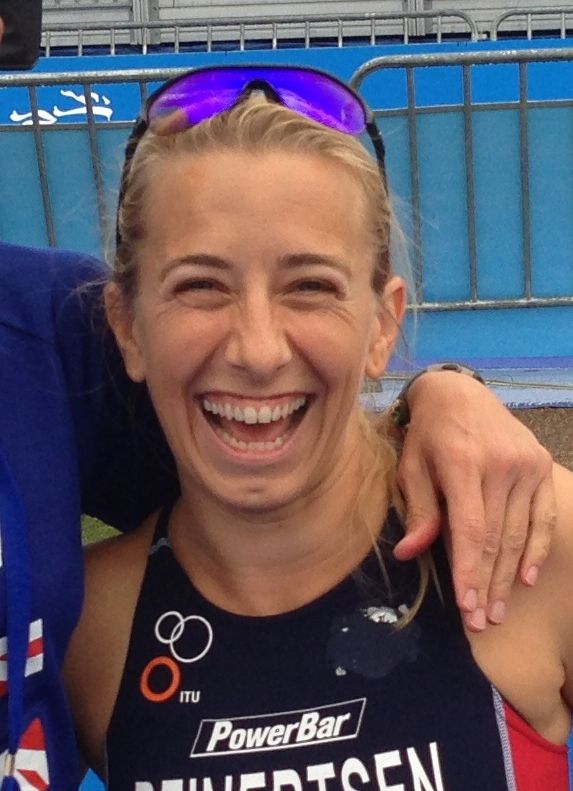
Sarah Reinertsen, The Amazing Race 10

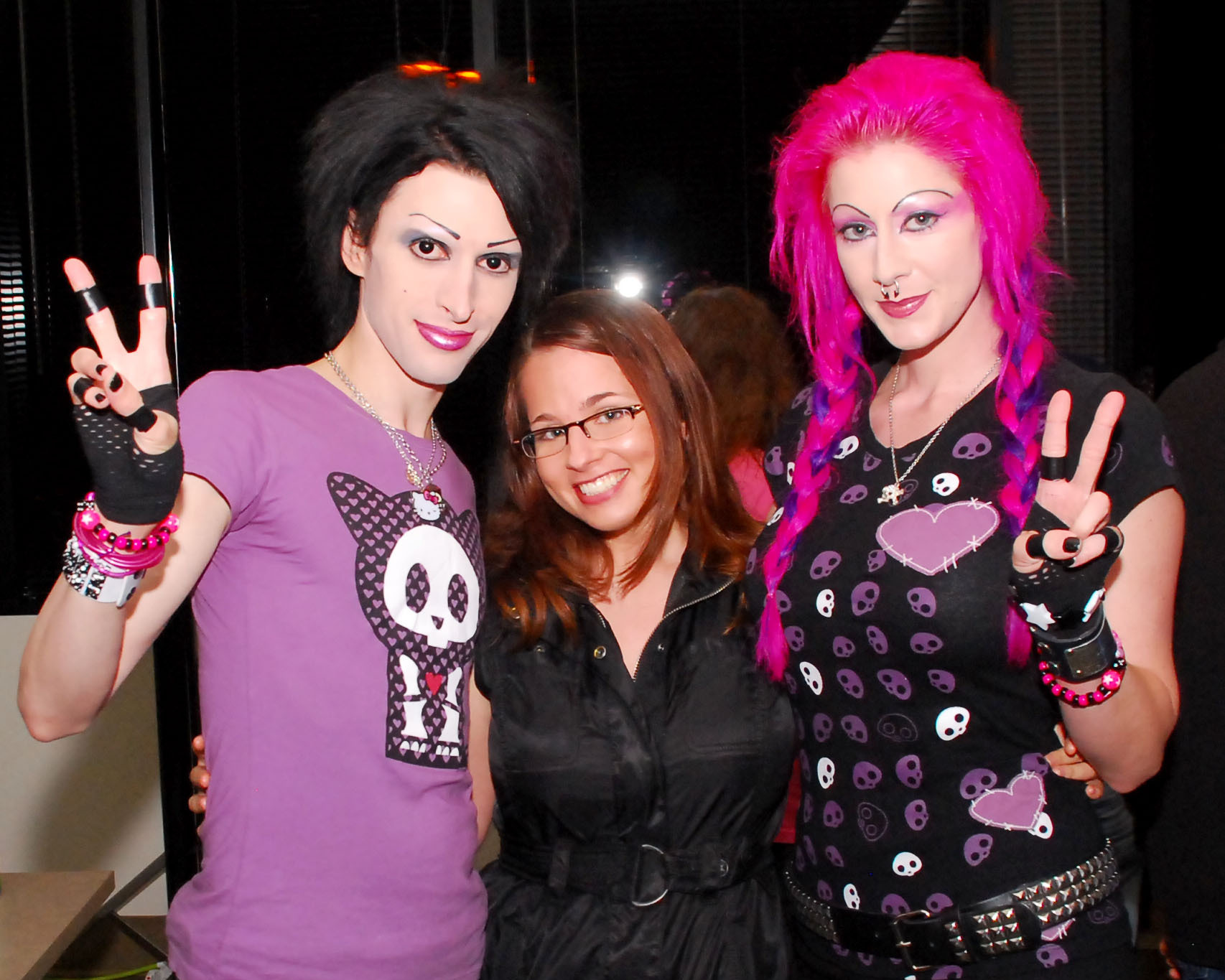
Kynt Kaliber (left) and Vyxsin Fiala (right), The Amazing Race 12 and The Amazing Race 18: Unfinished Business

This information was accurate at the time of filming.

Name	Age	Hometown	Season	Finish
John Lowe	38	Dorchester, Massachusetts	Season 9	11th
Scott Braginton-Smith	41	West Harwich, Massachusetts	Season 9	11th
Lisa Hinds	48	Santa Rosa Beach, Florida	Season 9	10th
Joni Glaze	44	Katy, Texas	Season 9	10th
Wanda Lopez-Rochford	44	Smyrna, Georgia	Season 9	9th
Desiree Cifre	24	New York, New York	Season 9	9th
Danielle Turner	22	Staten Island, New York	Season 9	8th
Dani Torchio	22	Staten Island, New York	Season 9	8th
Dave Spiker	30	Manhattan, Kansas	Season 9	7th
Lori Willems	25	Manhattan, Kansas	Season 9	7th
Lake Garner	37	Hattiesburg, Mississippi	Season 9	6th
Michelle Garner	36	Hattiesburg, Mississippi	Season 9	6th
Fran Lazarus	61	Silverthorne, Colorado	Season 9	5th
Barry Lazarus	63	Silverthorne, Colorado	Season 9	5th
Joseph Meadows	23	Fort Smith, Arkansas	Season 9	4th
Monica Cayce	23	Fort Smith, Arkansas	Season 9	4th
Ray Whitty	27	Chicago, Illinois	Season 9	3rd
Yolanda Brown-Moore	27	Chicago, Illinois	Season 9	3rd
Eric Sanchez	27	Deerfield Beach, Florida	Season 9	2nd
Jeremy Ryan	26	Pompano Beach, Florida	Season 9	2nd
B.J. Averell	26	Los Angeles, California	Season 9	1st
Tyler MacNiven	25	San Francisco, California	Season 9	1st
Bilal Abdul-Mani	37	Cleveland, Ohio	Season 10	12th
Sa'eed Rudolph	39	Cleveland, Ohio	Season 10	12th
Vipul Patel	29	Windermere, Florida	Season 10	11th
Arti Patel	26	Windermere, Florida	Season 10	11th
Kellie Patterson	22	Columbia, South Carolina	Season 10	10th
Jamie Hill	22	Columbia, South Carolina	Season 10	10th
Duke Marcoccio	52	Warwick, Rhode Island	Season 10	9th
Lauren Marcoccio	26	Warwick, Rhode Island	Season 10	9th
Tom Rock	39	New York, New York	Season 10	8th
Terry Cosentino	45	New York, New York	Season 10	8th
Peter Harsch	35	Laguna Beach, California	Season 10	7th
Sarah Reinertsen	31	Trabuco Canyon, California	Season 10	7th
David Conley Jr.	32	Stone, Kentucky	Season 10	6th
Mary Conley	31	Stone, Kentucky	Season 10	6th
Erwin Cho	32	San Francisco, California	Season 10	5th
Godwin Cho	29	San Francisco, California	Season 10	5th
Dustin-Leigh Konzelman	24	Riverside, California	Season 10	4th
Kandice Pelletier	24	New York, New York	Season 10	4th
Lyn Turk	32	Birmingham, Alabama	Season 10	3rd
Karlyn Harris	32	Helena, Alabama	Season 10	3rd
Rob Diaz	31	Los Angeles, California	Season 10	2nd
Kimberly Chabolla	28	Los Angeles, California	Season 10	2nd
Tyler Denk	29	Los Angeles, California	Season 10	1st
James Branaman	27	Los Angeles, California	Season 10	1st
John Vito Pietanza	32	New York, New York	Season 11 (All-Stars)	11th
Jill Aquilino	29	New York, New York	Season 11 (All-Stars)	11th
Kevin O'Connor	40	Bayonne, New Jersey	Season 11 (All-Stars)	10th
Drew Feinberg	41	Staten Island, New York	Season 11 (All-Stars)	10th
David Conley Jr.	33	Stone, Kentucky	Season 11 (All-Stars)	9th
Mary Conley	32	Stone, Kentucky	Season 11 (All-Stars)	9th
Rob Mariano	30	Pensacola, Florida	Season 11 (All-Stars)	8th
Amber Mariano	28	Pensacola, Florida	Season 11 (All-Stars)	8th
Teri Pollack	53	Palm City, Florida	Season 11 (All-Stars)	7th
Ian Pollack	54	Palm City, Florida	Season 11 (All-Stars)	7th
Joe Baldassare	56	Laguna Niguel, California	Season 11 (All-Stars)	6th
Bill Bartek	53	Laguna Niguel, California	Season 11 (All-Stars)	6th
Uchenna Agu	42	Houston, Texas	Season 11 (All-Stars)	5th
Joyce Agu	46	Houston, Texas	Season 11 (All-Stars)	5th
Oswald Mendez	36	New York, New York	Season 11 (All-Stars)	4th
Danny Jimenez	41	Miami, Florida	Season 11 (All-Stars)	4th
Charla Baklayan Faddoul	30	Towson, Maryland	Season 11 (All-Stars)	3rd
Mirna Hindoyan	30	Towson, Maryland	Season 11 (All-Stars)	3rd
Dustin Seltzer	24	Seattle, Washington	Season 11 (All-Stars)	2nd
Kandice Pelletier	25	New York, New York	Season 11 (All-Stars)	2nd
Eric Sanchez	28	Deerfield Beach, Florida	Season 11 (All-Stars)	1st
Danielle Turner	23	Staten Island, New York	Season 11 (All-Stars)	1st
Ari Bonias	21	Fountain Valley, California	Season 12	11th
Staella Gianakakos	23	Fountain Valley, California	Season 12	11th
Kate Lewis	49	Thousand Oaks, California	Season 12	10th
Pat Hendrickson	65	Thousand Oaks, California	Season 12	10th
Marianna Ruiz	25	Miami, Florida	Season 12	9th
Julia Ruiz	26	Miami, Florida	Season 12	9th
Lorena Segura	27	Sherman Oaks, California	Season 12	8th
Jason Widener	33	Sherman Oaks, California	Season 12	8th
Shana Wall	32	Los Angeles, California	Season 12	7th
Jennifer McCall	32	Los Angeles, California	Season 12	7th
Azaria Azene	27	New Orleans, Louisiana	Season 12	6th
Hendekea Azene	23	Torrance, California	Season 12	6th
Kent "Kynt" Cothron	31	Louisville, Kentucky	Season 12	5th
Jennifer "Vyxsin" Fiala	29	Louisville, Kentucky	Season 12	5th
Nathan Hagstrom	24	Fountain Valley, California	Season 12	4th
Jennifer Parker	23	Huntington Beach, California	Season 12	4th
Nicolas Fulks	23	Chicago, Illinois	Season 12	3rd
Don Jerousek	68	Elkhorn, Wisconsin	Season 12	3rd
Ronald Hsu	58	Tacoma, Washington	Season 12	2nd
Christina Hsu	26	Washington, D.C.	Season 12	2nd
T.K. Erwin	22	Huntington Beach, California	Season 12	1st
Rachel Rosales	23	Huntington Beach, California	Season 12	1st

== Seasons 13–16 (2008–2010) ==
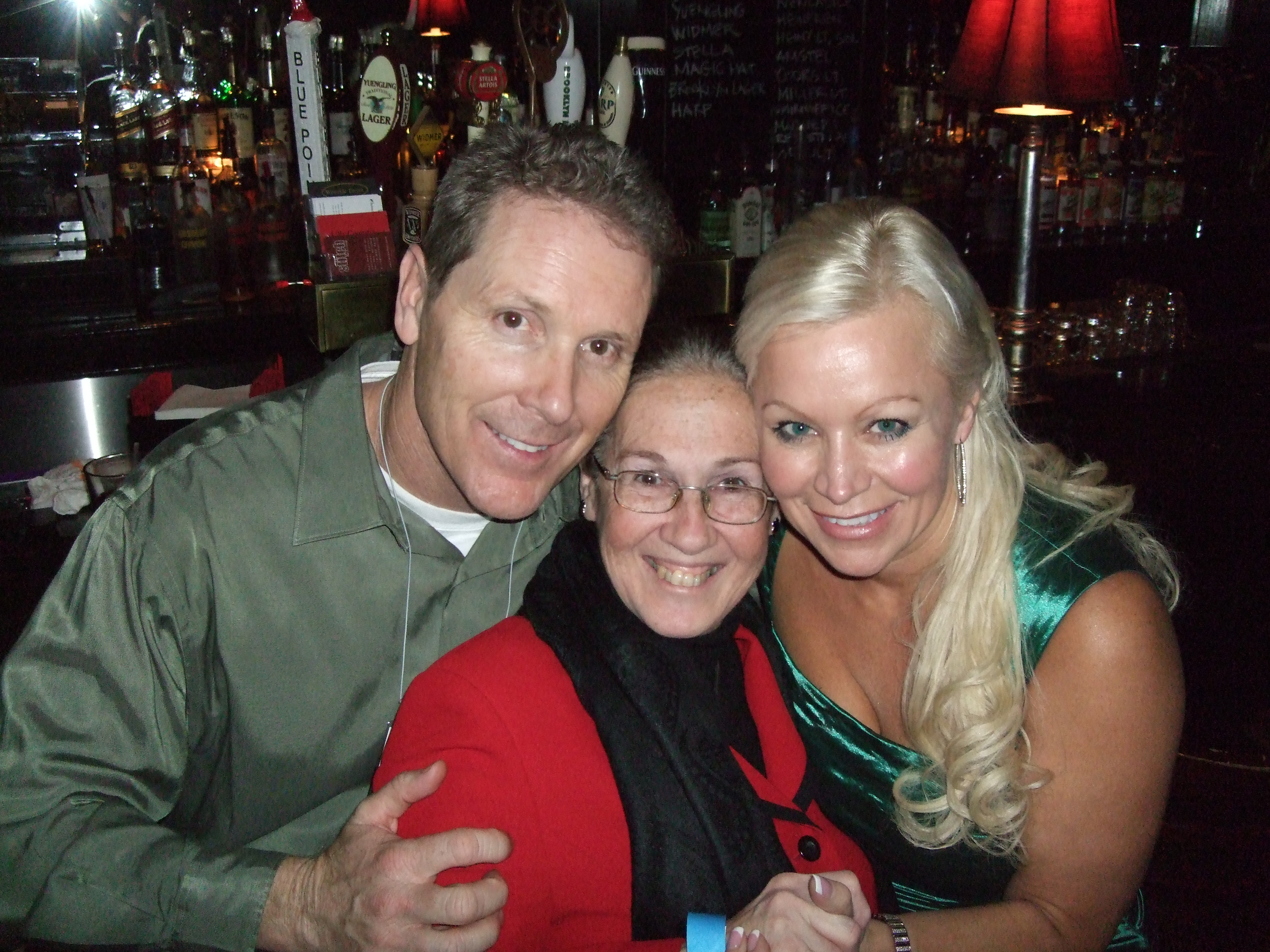
Ken Greene (left) and Tina Greene (right), The Amazing Race 13

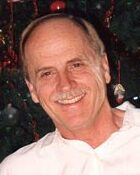
Mel White, The Amazing Race 14 and The Amazing Race 18: Unfinished Business

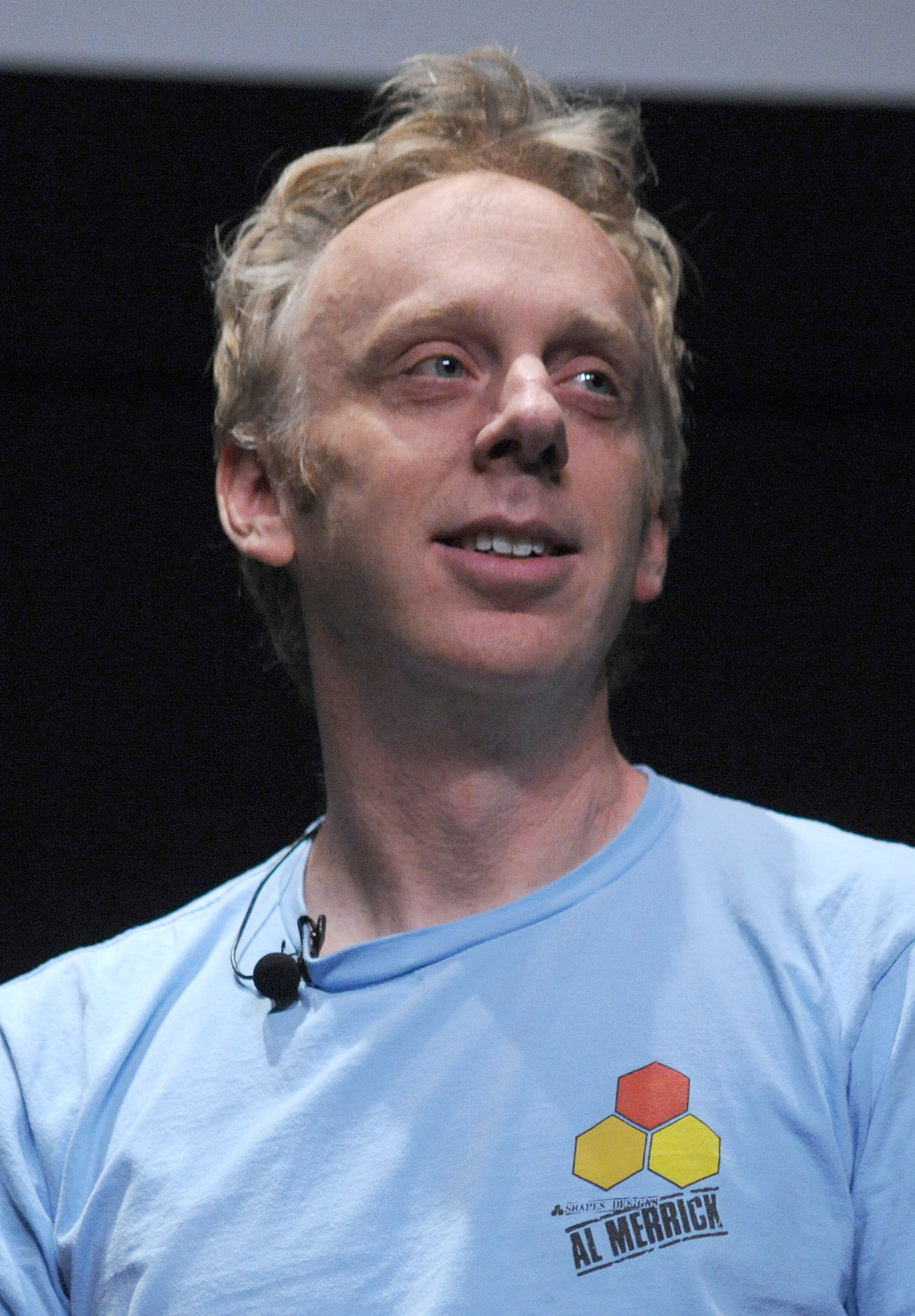
Mike White, The Amazing Race 14 and The Amazing Race 18: Unfinished Business

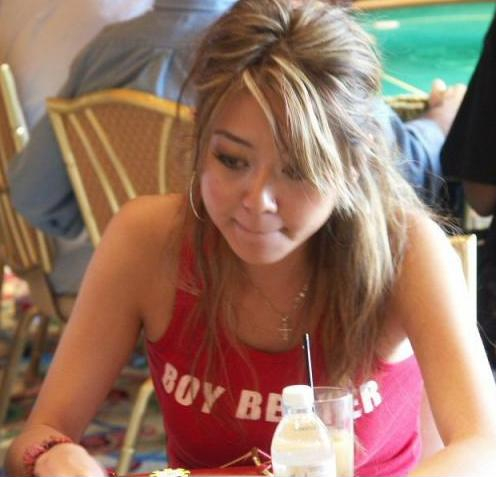
Maria Ho, The Amazing Race 15

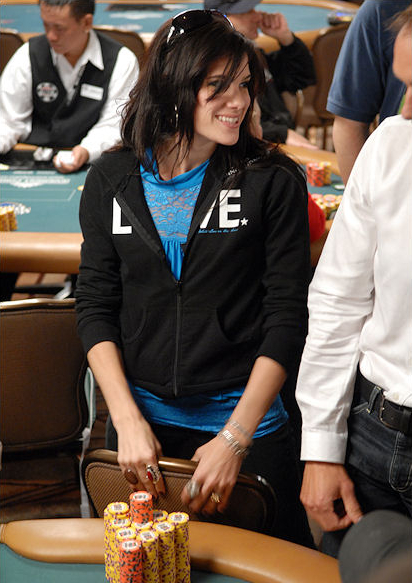
Tiffany Michelle, The Amazing Race 15

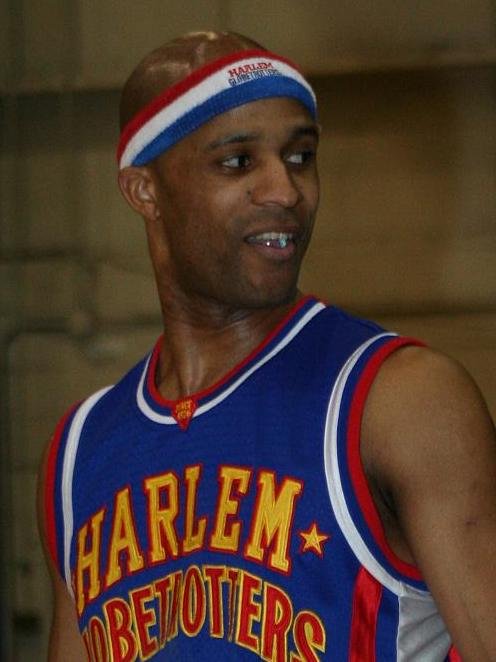
Herbert "Flight Time" Lang, The Amazing Race 15, The Amazing Race 18: Unfinished Business and The Amazing Race 24: All-Stars

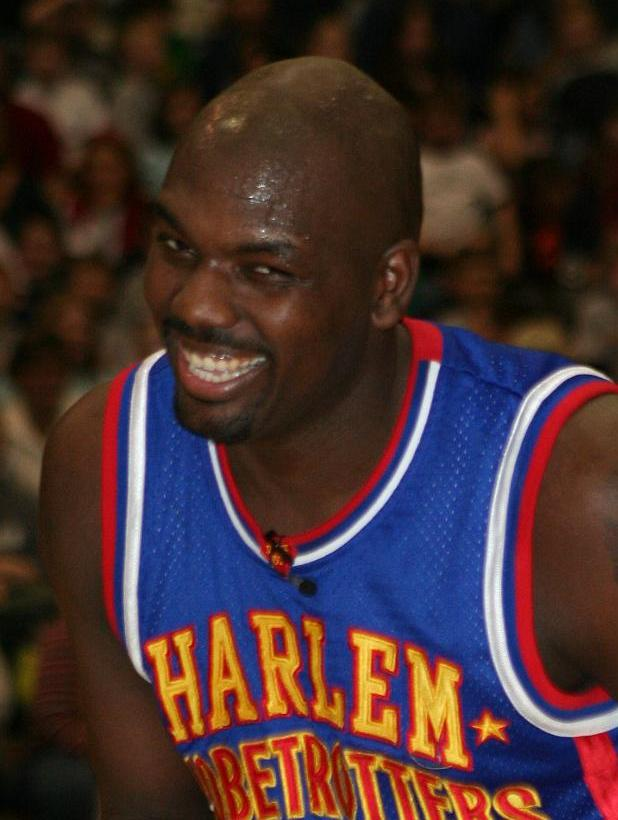
Nathaniel "Big Easy" Lofton, The Amazing Race 15, The Amazing Race 18: Unfinished Business and The Amazing Race 24: All-Stars

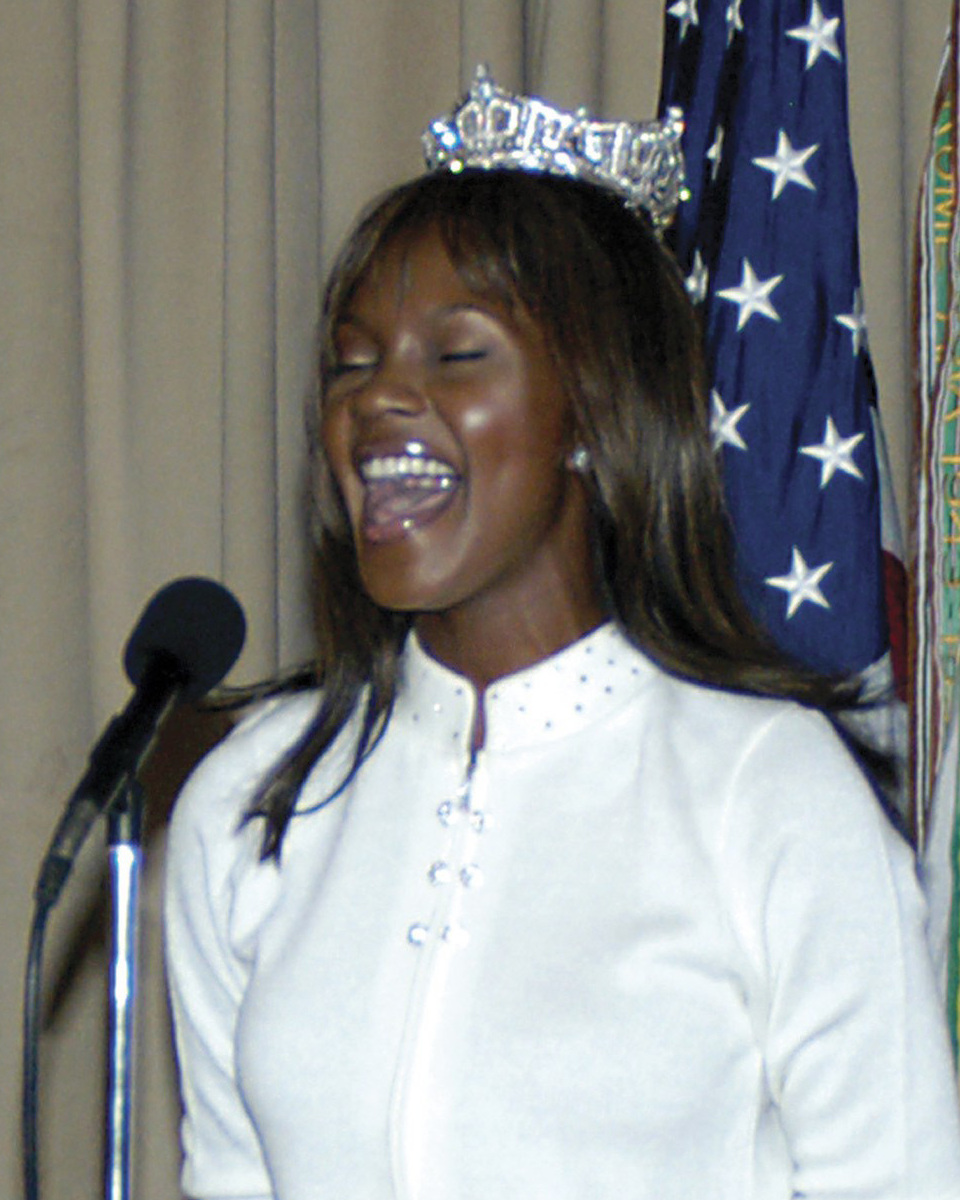
Ericka Dunlap, The Amazing Race 15

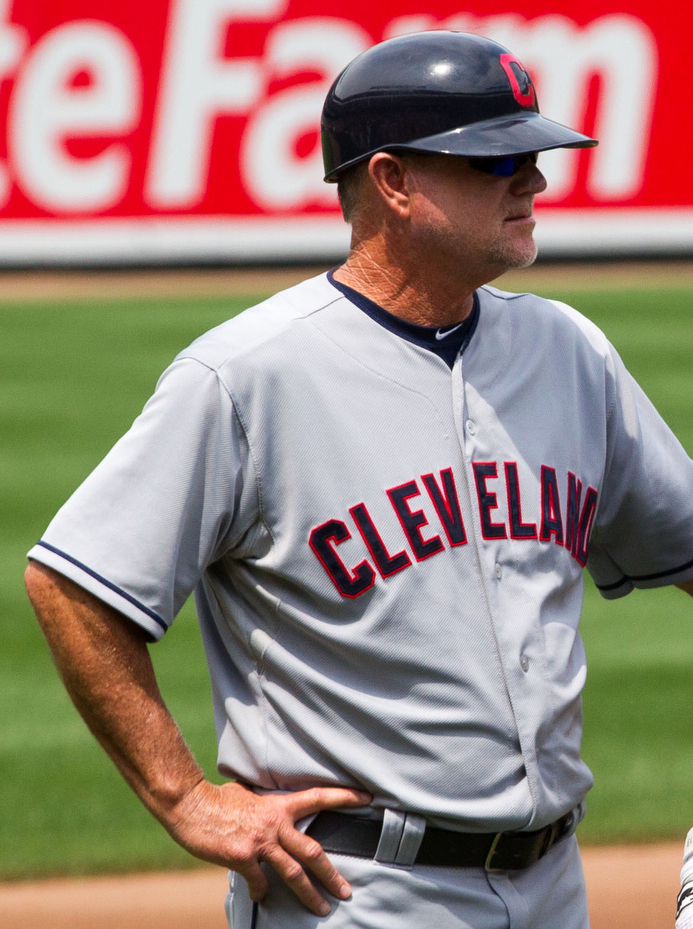
Steve Smith, The Amazing Race 16

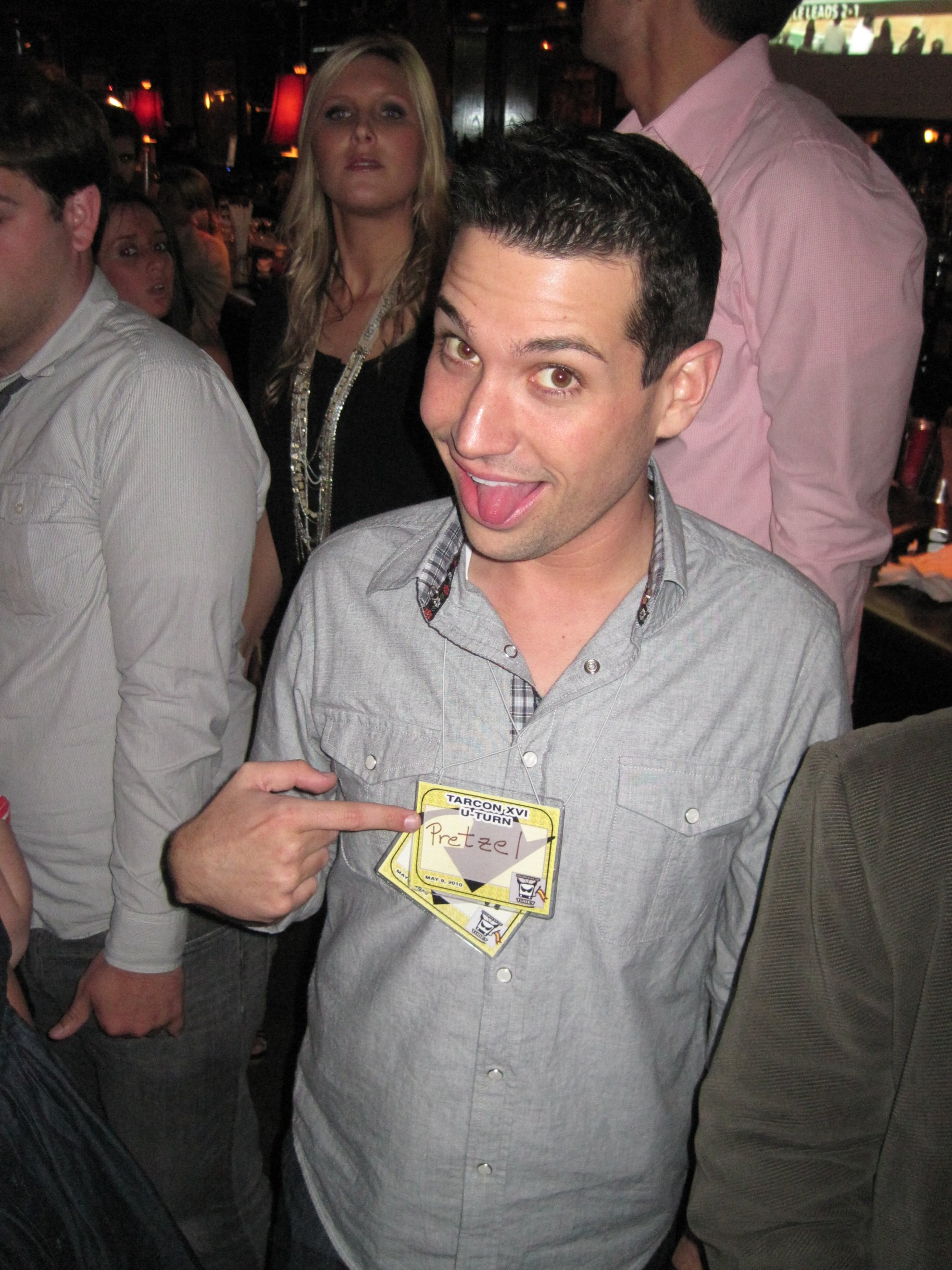
Jordan Pious, The Amazing Race 16

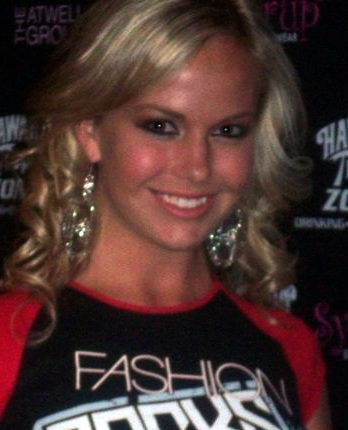
Caite Upton, The Amazing Race 16

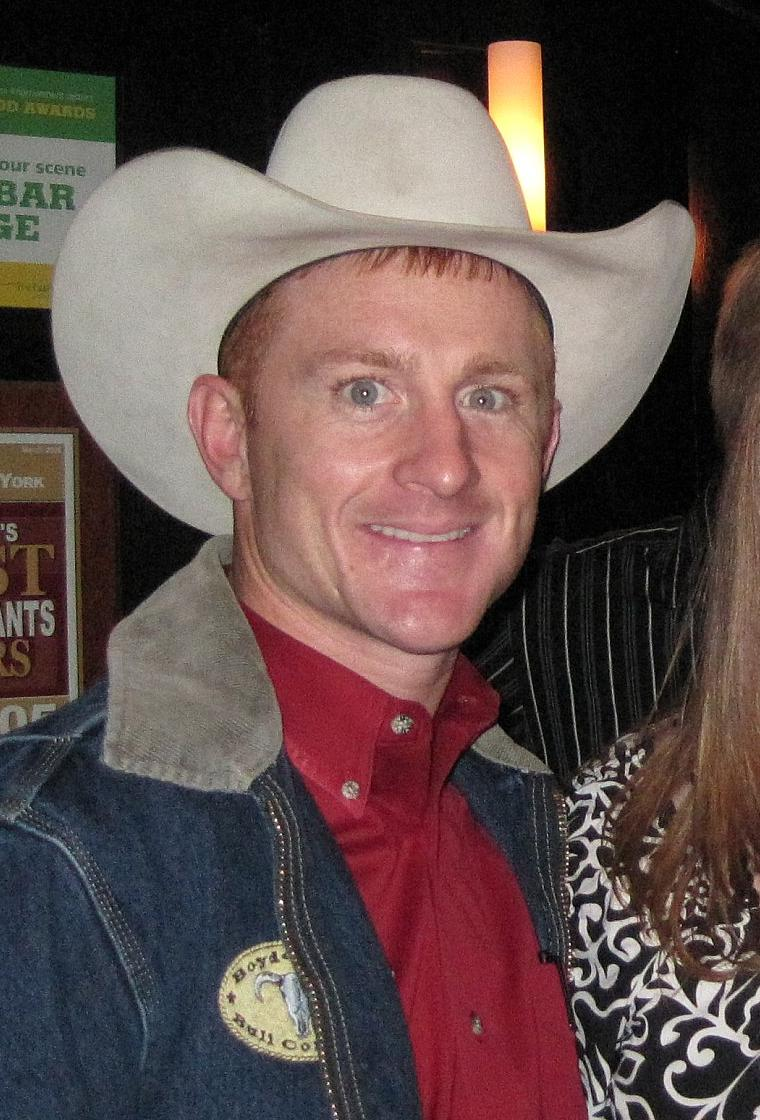
Cord McCoy, The Amazing Race 16

This information was accurate at the time of filming.

Name	Age	Hometown	Season	Finish
Anita Jones	63	Eugene, Oregon	Season 13	11th
Arthur Jones	61	Eugene, Oregon	Season 13	11th
Anthony Marotta	32	Los Angeles, California	Season 13	10th
Stephanie Kacandes	32	Los Angeles, California	Season 13	10th
Mark Yturralde	41	San Diego, California	Season 13	9th
Bill Kahler	42	San Diego, California	Season 13	9th
Marisa Axelrod	22	Spartanburg, South Carolina	Season 13	8th
Brooke Jackson	24	Columbia, South Carolina	Season 13	8th
Aja Benton	25	Los Angeles, California	Season 13	7th
Ty White	25	West Bloomfield, Michigan	Season 13	7th
Kelly Crabb	26	Houston, Texas	Season 13	6th
Christy Cook	26	Austin, Texas	Season 13	6th
Terence Gerchberg	35	New York, New York	Season 13	5th
Sarah Leshner	31	New York, New York	Season 13	5th
Toni Imbimbo	51	Woodside, California	Season 13	4th
Dallas Imbimbo	22	Woodside, California	Season 13	4th
Andrew Lappitt	22	Tucson, Arizona	Season 13	3rd
Dan Honig	23	Wilmington, Delaware	Season 13	3rd
Ken Greene	51	Tampa, Florida	Season 13	2nd
Tina Greene	48	San Diego, California	Season 13	2nd
Nick Spangler	22	New York, New York	Season 13	1st
Emily "Starr" Spangler	21	Fort Worth, Texas	Season 13	1st
Preston McCamy	28	Columbia, South Carolina	Season 14	11th
Jennifer Hopka	26	Columbia, South Carolina	Season 14	11th
Steve Cole	43	Martinsville, Virginia	Season 14	10th
Linda Cole	52	Martinsville, Virginia	Season 14	10th
Brad Hunt	52	Columbus, Ohio	Season 14	9th
Victoria Hunt	47	Columbus, Ohio	Season 14	9th
Amanda Blackledge	23	San Diego, California	Season 14	8th
Kris Klicka	24	San Diego, California	Season 14	8th
Christie Volkmer	37	Choctaw, Oklahoma	Season 14	7th
Jodi Wincheski	40	Houston, Texas	Season 14	7th
Mel White	68	Lynchburg, Virginia	Season 14	6th
Mike White	38	Santa Monica, California	Season 14	6th
Mark Munoz	48	Los Angeles, California	Season 14	5th
Michael Munoz	51	Maui, Hawaii	Season 14	5th
Kisha Hoffman	28	The Bronx, New York	Season 14	4th
Jen Hoffman	24	Louisville, Kentucky	Season 14	4th
Margie Adams	50	Denver, Colorado	Season 14	3rd
Luke Adams	22	Denver, Colorado	Season 14	3rd
Jaime Edmondson	29	Fort Lauderdale, Florida	Season 14	2nd
Cara Rosenthal	26	Boca Raton, Florida	Season 14	2nd
Tammy Jih	26	San Francisco, California	Season 14	1st
Victor Jih	35	Los Angeles, California	Season 14	1st
Eric Paskel	41	Encino, California	Season 15	12th
Lisa Paskel	43	Encino, California	Season 15	12th
Garrett Paul	28	Santa Cruz, California	Season 15	11th
Jessica Stout	27	San Francisco, California	Season 15	11th
Marcy Malloy	60	San Francisco, California	Season 15	10th
Ron Shalita	59	San Francisco, California	Season 15	10th
Zev Glassenberg	26	Sherman Oaks, California	Season 15	9th
Justin Kanew	30	Los Angeles, California	Season 15	9th
Lance Layne	41	Salem, Massachusetts	Season 15	8th
Keri Morrione	33	Peabody, Massachusetts	Season 15	8th
Mika Combs	22	Nashville, Tennessee	Season 15	7th
Canaan Smith	26	Nashville, Tennessee	Season 15	7th
Maria Ho	26	Arcadia, California	Season 15	6th
Tiffany Michelle	25	Los Angeles, California	Season 15	6th
Gary Tomljenovich	47	Laurel, Montana	Season 15	5th
Matt Tomljenovich	22	Bozeman, Montana	Season 15	5th
Herbert "Flight Time" Lang	32	Brinkley, Arkansas	Season 15	4th
Nathaniel "Big Easy" Lofton	28	New Orleans, Louisiana	Season 15	4th
Brian Kleinschmidt	27	Nashville, Tennessee	Season 15	3rd
Ericka Dunlap	27	Nashville, Tennessee	Season 15	3rd
Sam McMillen	23	Liberty, Missouri	Season 15	2nd
Dan McMillen	21	Liberty, Missouri	Season 15	2nd
Meghan Rickey	23	San Diego, California	Season 15	1st
Cheyne Whitney	23	San Diego, California	Season 15	1st
Dana Davis	39	Arlington, Texas	Season 16	11th
Adrian Davis	40	Arlington, Texas	Season 16	11th
Jody Kelly	71	Round Rock, Texas	Season 16	10th
Shannon Foster	22	Georgetown, Texas	Season 16	10th
Monique Pryor	39	West Orange, New Jersey	Season 16	9th
Shawne Morgan	39	Bowie, Maryland	Season 16	9th
Joe Wang	42	El Segundo, California	Season 16	8th
Heidi Wang	37	El Segundo, California	Season 16	8th
Jordan Lloyd	22	Charlotte, North Carolina	Season 16	7th
Jeff Schroeder	31	Norridge, Illinois	Season 16	7th
Steve Smith	57	Encinitas, California	Season 16	6th
Allie Smith	23	Encinitas, California	Season 16	6th
Carol Rosenfeld	47	Los Angeles, California	Season 16	5th
Brandy Snow	40	Los Angeles, California	Season 16	5th
Louie Stravato	47	Providence, Rhode Island	Season 16	4th
Michael Naylor	45	Providence, Rhode Island	Season 16	4th
Brent Horne	28	Columbia, South Carolina	Season 16	3rd
Caite Upton	20	Lexington, South Carolina	Season 16	3rd
Jet McCoy	30	Ada, Oklahoma	Season 16	2nd
Cord McCoy	29	Tupelo, Oklahoma	Season 16	2nd
Dan Pious	24	Barrington, Rhode Island	Season 16	1st
Jordan Pious	22	Barrington, Rhode Island	Season 16	1st

== Seasons 17–20 (2010–2012) ==
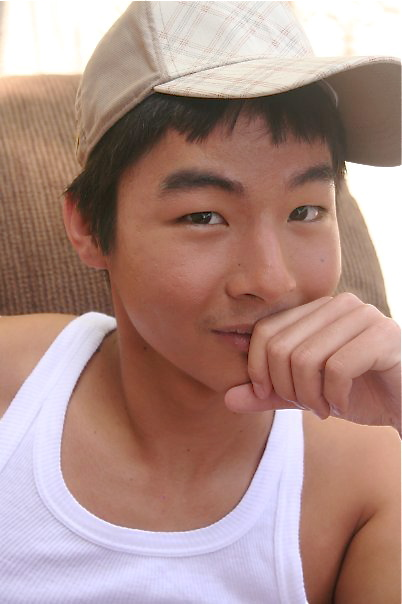
Kevin Wu, The Amazing Race 17

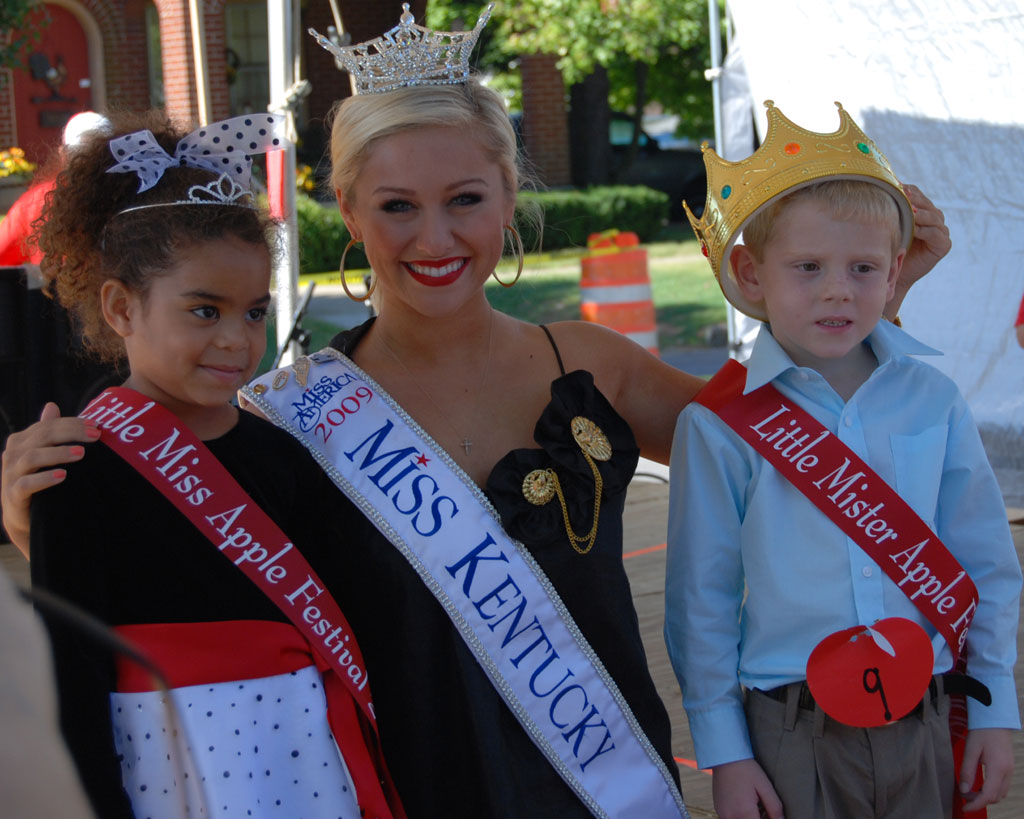
Mallory Ervin (center), The Amazing Race 17, The Amazing Race 18: Unfinished Business and The Amazing Race 24: All-Stars

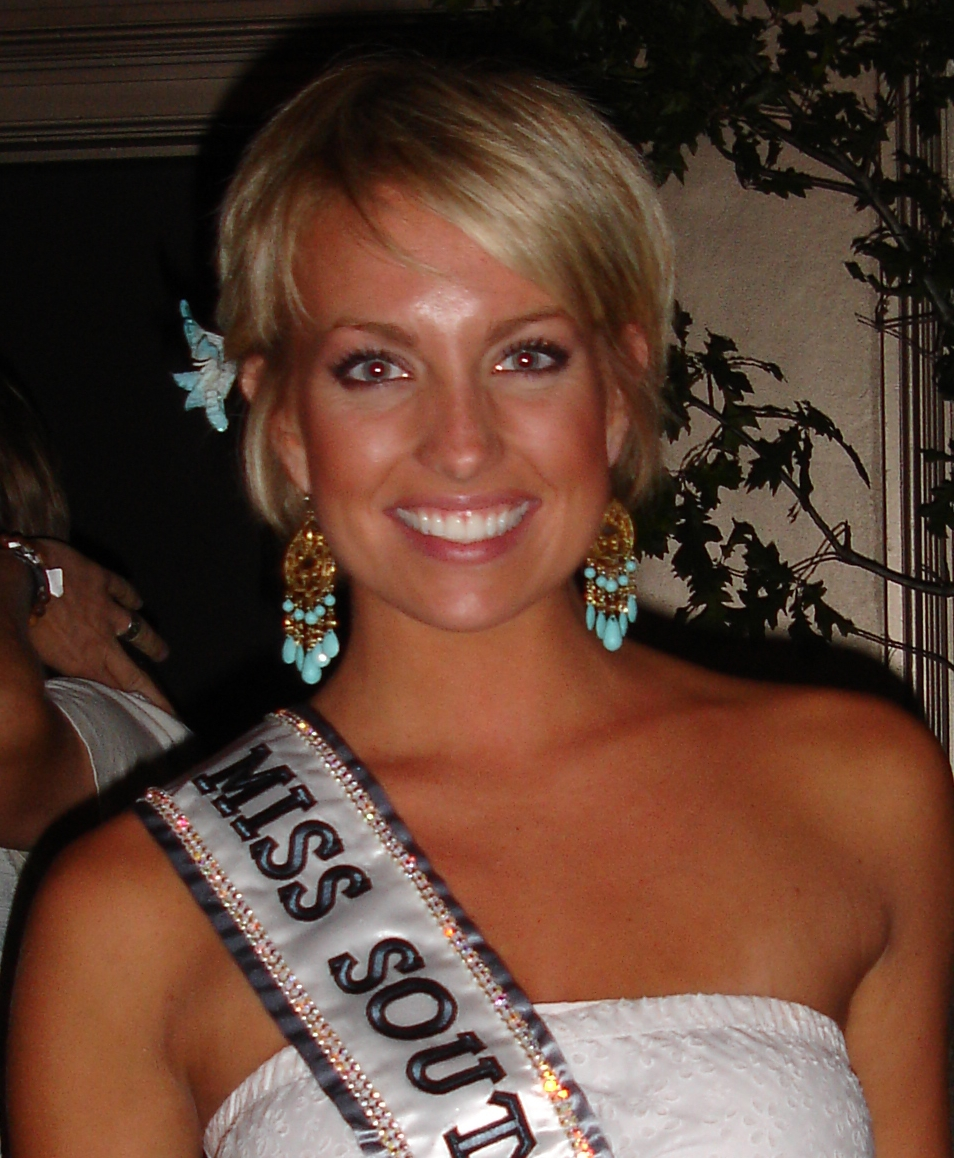
Stephanie Smith, The Amazing Race 17

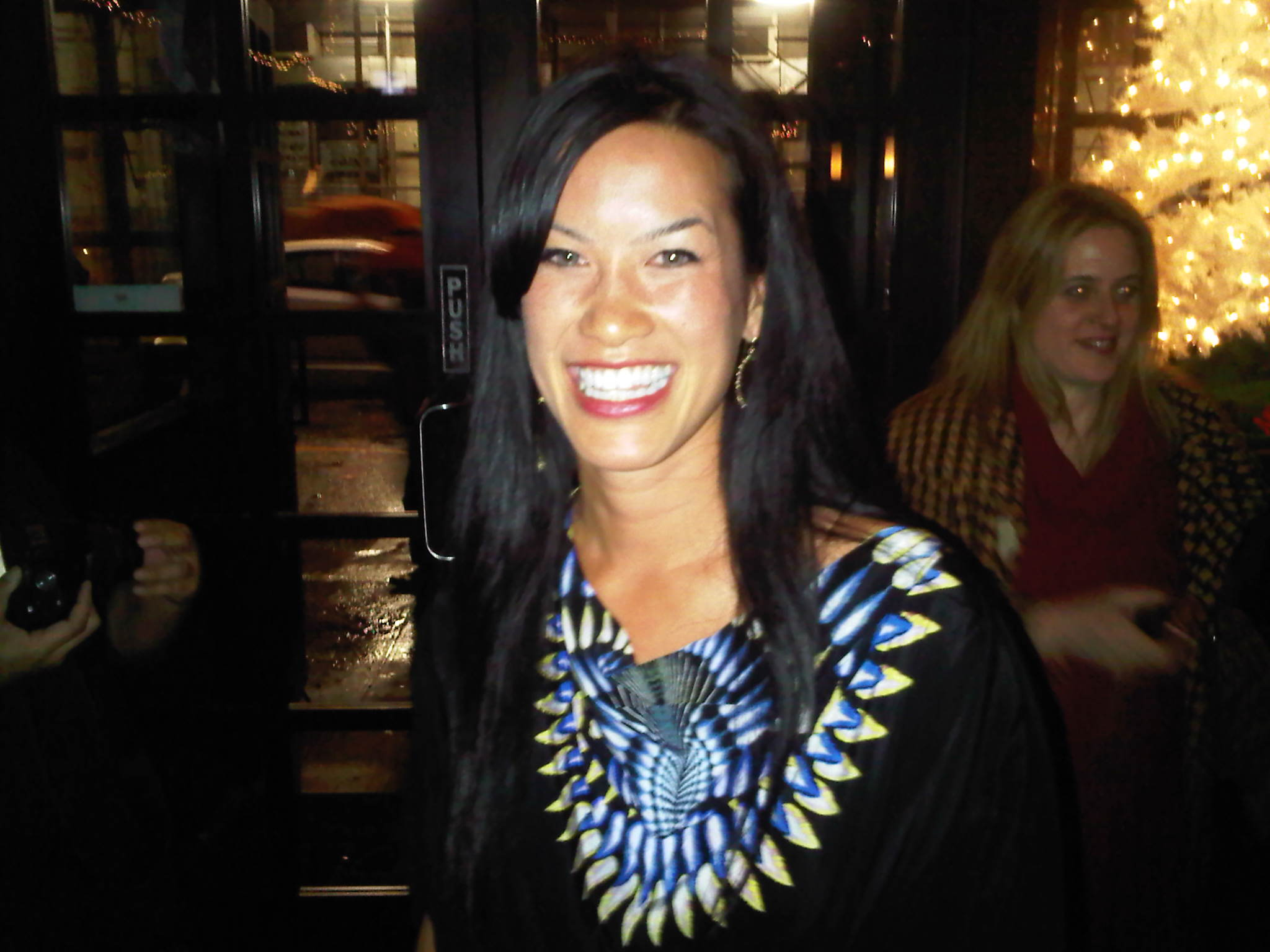
Kat Chang, The Amazing Race 17

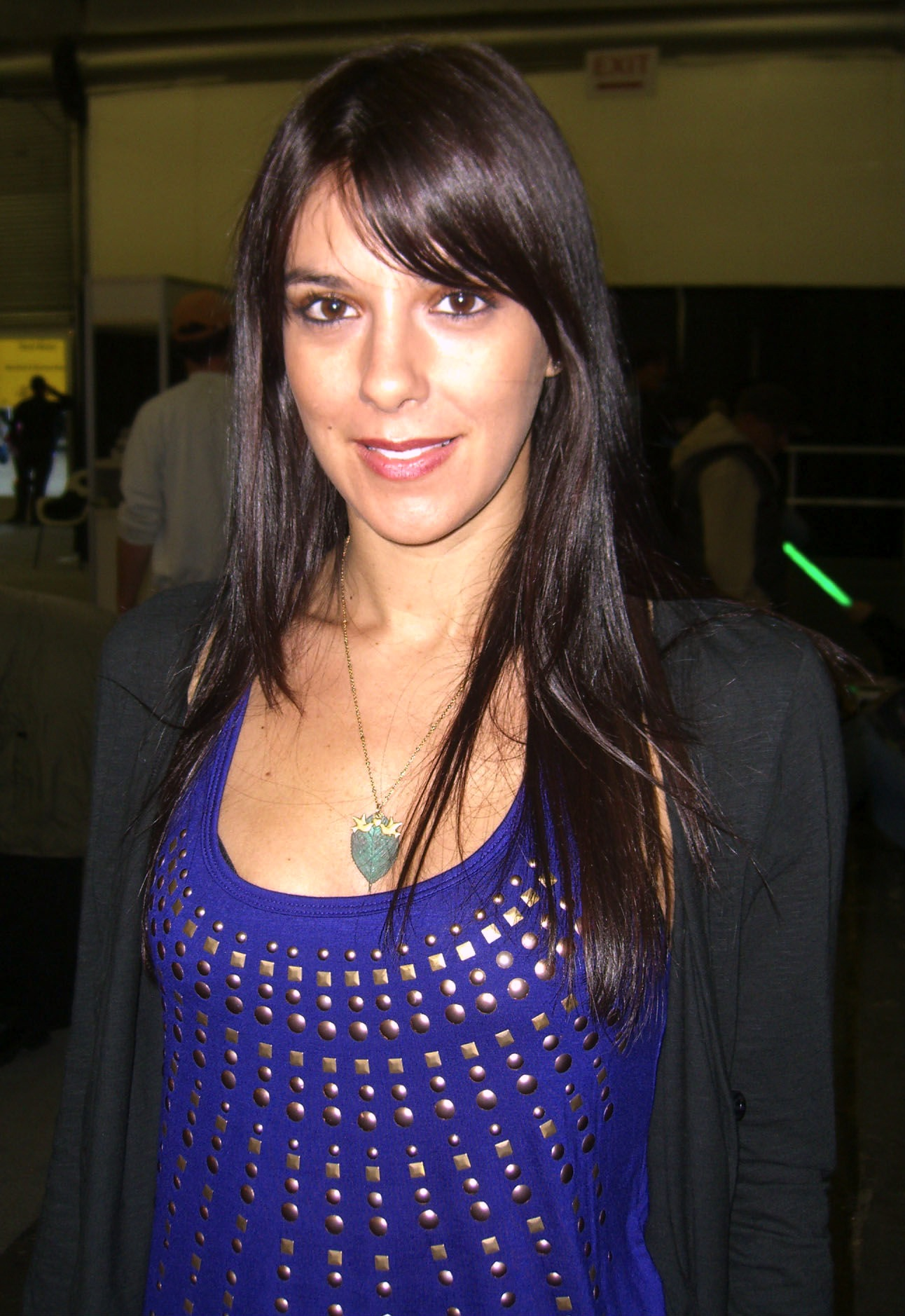
Jenna Morasca, The Amazing Race 19

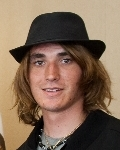
Zac Sunderland, The Amazing Race 19

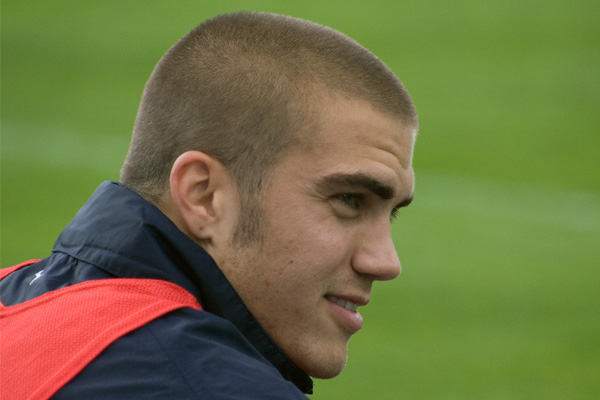
Andrew Weber, The Amazing Race 20

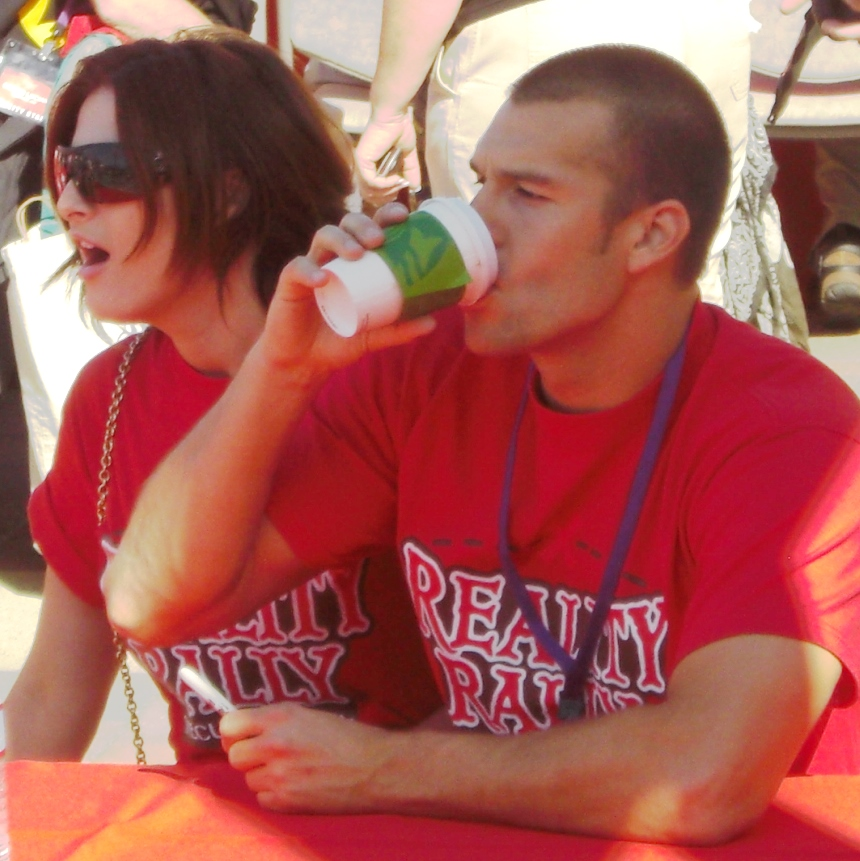
Rachel Reilly and Brendon Villegas, The Amazing Race 20 and The Amazing Race 24: All-Stars

This information was accurate at the time of filming.

Name	Age	Hometown	Season	Finish
Ron Kellum	45	Los Angeles, California	Season 17	11th
Tony Stovall	42	Tucson, Arizona	Season 17	11th
Andie DeKroon	43	Atlanta, Georgia	Season 17	10th
Jenna Sykes	21	Athens, Georgia	Season 17	10th
Connor Diemand-Yauman	22	Chesterland, Ohio	Season 17	9th
Jonathan Schwartz	22	Cranford, New Jersey	Season 17	9th
Katie Seamon	23	Rahway, New Jersey	Season 17	8th
Rachel Johnston	24	Moorestown, New Jersey	Season 17	8th
Michael Wu	58	Sugar Land, Texas	Season 17	7th
Kevin Wu	20	Sugar Land, Texas	Season 17	7th
Gary Ervin	53	Morganfield, Kentucky	Season 17	6th
Mallory Ervin	24	Lexington, Kentucky	Season 17	6th
Chad Waltrip	26	Fort Lauderdale, Florida	Season 17	5th
Stephanie Smith	23	Fort Lauderdale, Florida	Season 17	5th
Nick DeCarlo	26	Henderson, Nevada	Season 17	4th
Vicki Casciola	26	Henderson, Nevada	Season 17	4th
Jill Haney	27	Marina Del Rey, California	Season 17	3rd
Thomas Wolfard	30	Marina Del Rey, California	Season 17	3rd
Brook Roberts	27	San Diego, California	Season 17	2nd
Claire Champlin	30	Reno, Nevada	Season 17	2nd
Nat Strand	31	Newport Beach, California	Season 17	1st
Kat Chang	35	Santa Monica, California	Season 17	1st
Amanda Blackledge	25	Pismo Beach, California	Season 18 (Unfinished Business)	11th
Kris Klicka	27	Pismo Beach, California	Season 18 (Unfinished Business)	11th
Mel White	70	Lynchburg, Virginia	Season 18 (Unfinished Business)	10th
Mike White	40	Los Angeles, California	Season 18 (Unfinished Business)	10th
Jaime Edmondson	32	Fort Lauderdale, Florida	Season 18 (Unfinished Business)	9th
Cara Rosenthal	28	Boca Raton, Florida	Season 18 (Unfinished Business)	9th
Margie Adams	53	Colorado Springs, Colorado	Season 18 (Unfinished Business)	8th
Luke Adams	25	Colorado Springs, Colorado	Season 18 (Unfinished Business)	8th
Ron Hsu	61	Tacoma, Washington	Season 18 (Unfinished Business)	7th
Christina Hsu	29	Washington, D.C.	Season 18 (Unfinished Business)	7th
Jet McCoy	31	Ada, Oklahoma	Season 18 (Unfinished Business)	6th
Cord McCoy	30	Tupelo, Oklahoma	Season 18 (Unfinished Business)	6th
Kent Kaliber	35	Los Angeles, California	Season 18 (Unfinished Business)	5th
Jennifer "Vyxsin" Fiala	32	Los Angeles, California	Season 18 (Unfinished Business)	5th
Zev Glassenberg	28	Sherman Oaks, California	Season 18 (Unfinished Business)	4th
Justin Kanew	31	Los Angeles, California	Season 18 (Unfinished Business)	4th
Gary Ervin	53	Morganfield, Kentucky	Season 18 (Unfinished Business)	3rd
Mallory Ervin	25	Morganfield, Kentucky	Season 18 (Unfinished Business)	3rd
Herbert "Flight Time" Lang	34	Brinkley, Arkansas	Season 18 (Unfinished Business)	2nd
Nathaniel "Big Easy" Lofton	29	New Orleans, Louisiana	Season 18 (Unfinished Business)	2nd
Kisha Hoffman	30	The Bronx, New York	Season 18 (Unfinished Business)	1st
Jen Hoffman	26	Louisville, Kentucky	Season 18 (Unfinished Business)	1st
Ron Zeitz	44	Laguna Niguel, California	Season 19	11th
Bill Smith	49	Laguna Niguel, California	Season 19	11th
Ethan Zohn	37	New York, New York	Season 19	10th
Jenna Morasca	30	New York, New York	Season 19	10th
Kaylani Paliotta	33	Las Vegas, Nevada	Season 19	9th
Lisa Tilley	32	Las Vegas, Nevada	Season 19	9th
Liz Canavan	24	Deerfield, Illinois	Season 19	8th
Marie Canavan	24	Deerfield, Illinois	Season 19	8th
Justin Young	31	Stone Mountain, Georgia	Season 19	7th
Jennifer Young	26	Stone Mountain, Georgia	Season 19	7th
Laurence Sunderland	48	Thousand Oaks, California	Season 19	6th
Zac Sunderland	19	Thousand Oaks, California	Season 19	6th
Bill Alden	63	Albany, Oregon	Season 19	5th
Cathi Alden	62	Albany, Oregon	Season 19	5th
Andy Finch	30	Truckee, California	Season 19	4th
Tommy Czeschin	32	Crowley Lake, California	Season 19	4th
Amani Pollard	36	Pine Mountain, Georgia	Season 19	3rd
Marcus Pollard	39	Pine Mountain, Georgia	Season 19	3rd
Jeremy Cline	35	Alamo, California	Season 19	2nd
Sandy Draghi	33	Dublin, California	Season 19	2nd
Ernie Halvorsen	29	Chicago, Illinois	Season 19	1st
Cindy Chiang	30	Chicago, Illinois	Season 19	1st
Misa Tanaka	27	San Diego, California	Season 20	11th
Maiya Tanaka	25	San Diego, California	Season 20	11th
Dave Gregg	44	New Port Richey, Florida	Season 20	10th
Cherie Gregg	44	New Port Richey, Florida	Season 20	10th
Elliot Weber	28	Scottsdale, Arizona	Season 20	9th
Andrew Weber	28	Menlo Park, California	Season 20	9th
Kerri Paul	30	Gulfport, Mississippi	Season 20	8th
Stacy Bowers	30	Gulfport, Mississippi	Season 20	8th
Joey "Fitness" Lasalla	29	Whitestone, New York	Season 20	7th
Danny Horal	27	Holbrook, New York	Season 20	7th
Nary Ebeid	32	Los Angeles, California	Season 20	6th
Jamie Graetz	33	Los Angeles, California	Season 20	6th
William "Bopper" Minton	41	Manchester, Kentucky	Season 20	5th
Mark Jackson	45	Manchester, Kentucky	Season 20	5th
Vanessa Macias	31	San Antonio, Texas	Season 20	4th
Ralph Kelley	36	San Antonio, Texas	Season 20	4th
Brendon Villegas	31	Westwood, California	Season 20	3rd
Rachel Reilly	27	Westwood, California	Season 20	3rd
Art Velez	43	Temecula, California	Season 20	2nd
J.J. Carrell	42	Carlsbad, California	Season 20	2nd
Rachel Brown	30	Madison, Wisconsin	Season 20	1st
Dave Brown Jr.	33	Madison, Wisconsin	Season 20	1st

== Seasons 21–24 (2012–2014) ==
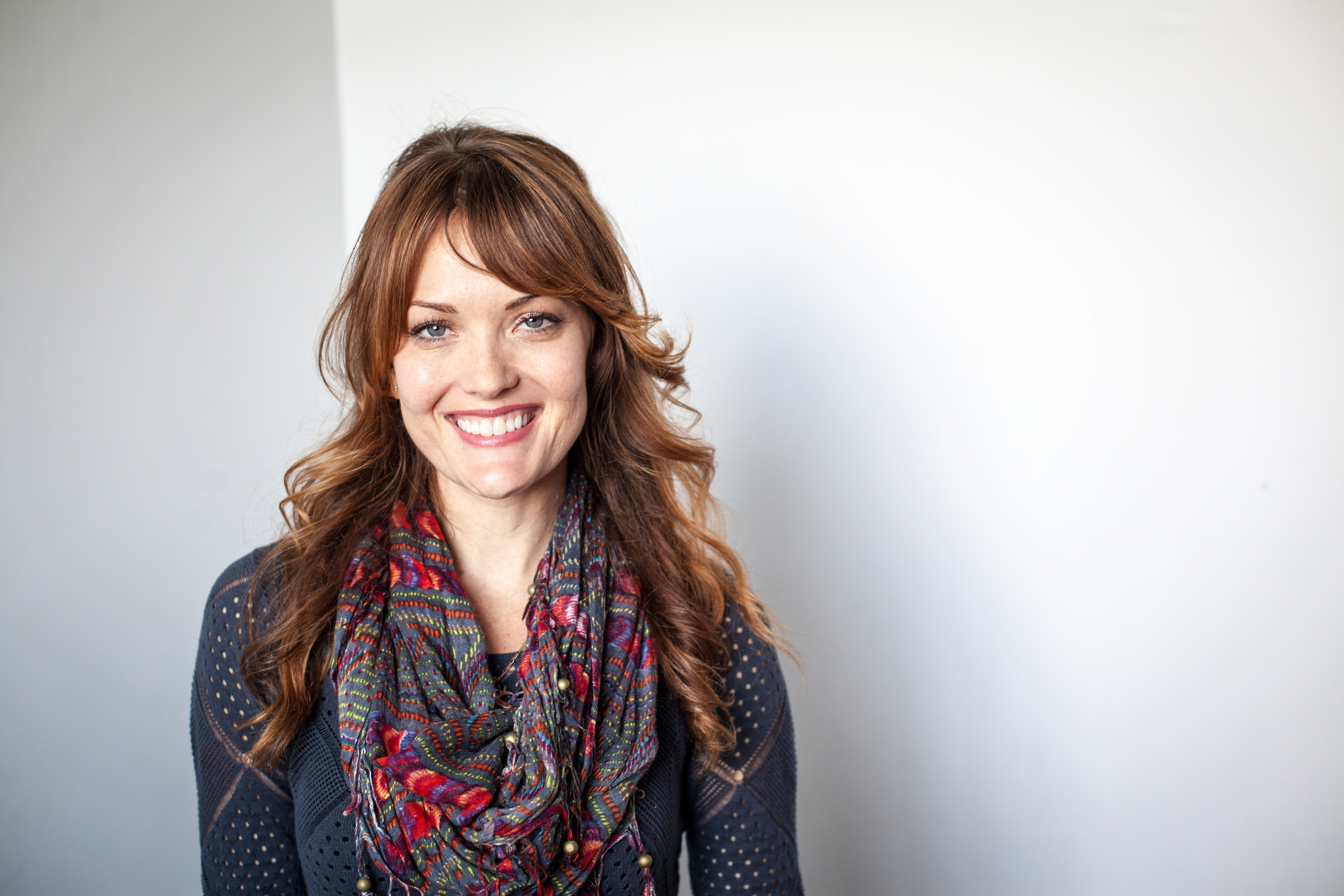
Amy Purdy, The Amazing Race 21

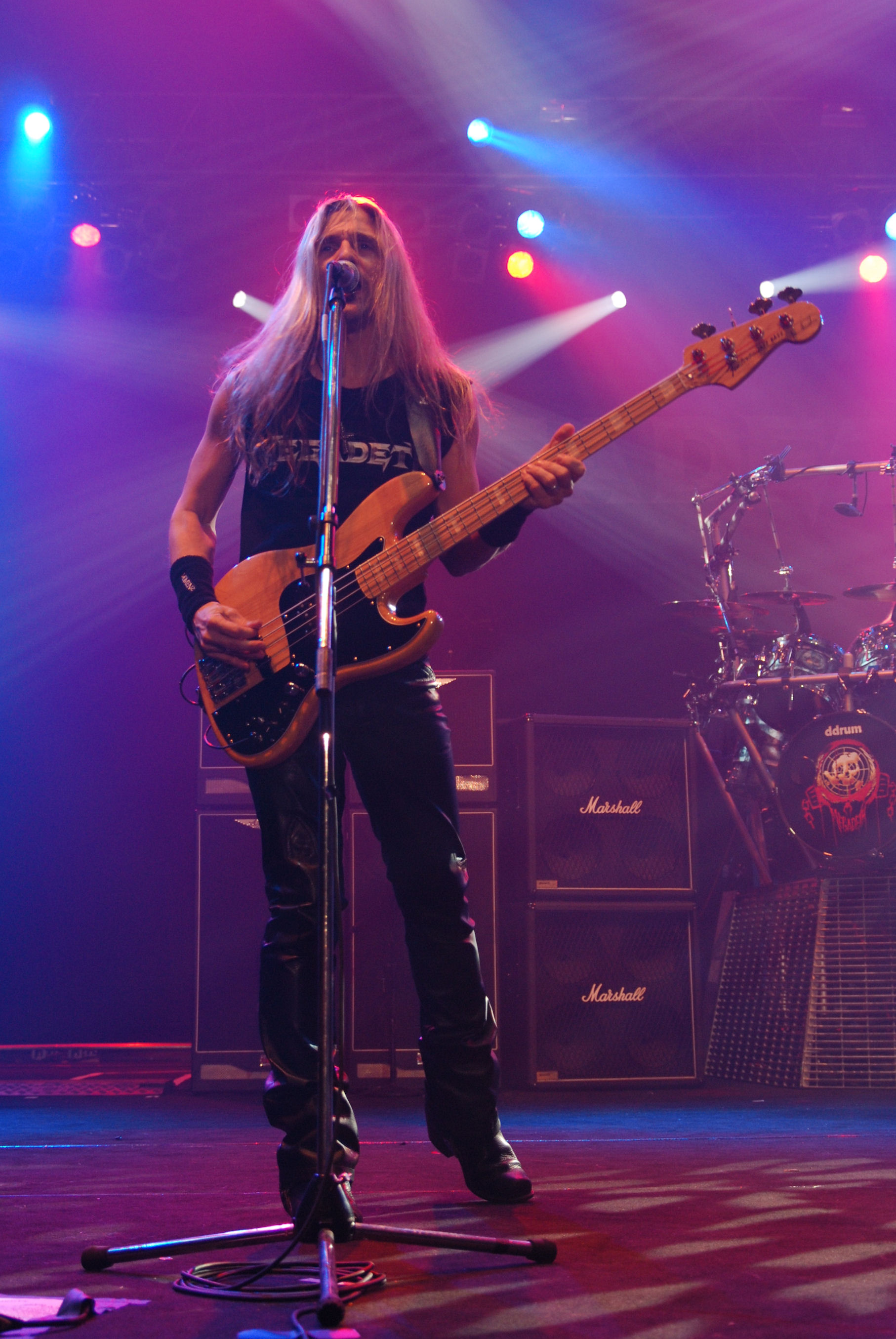
James LoMenzo, The Amazing Race 21

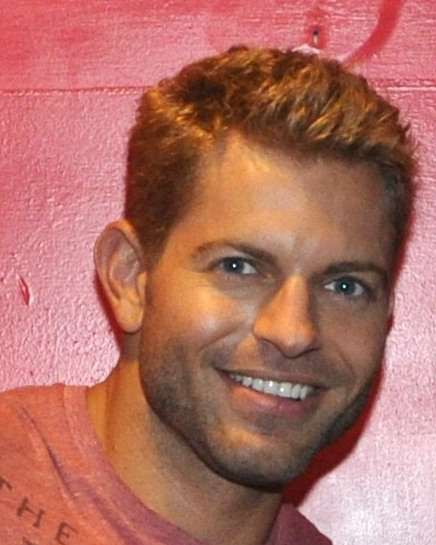
Jaymes Vaughan, The Amazing Race 21

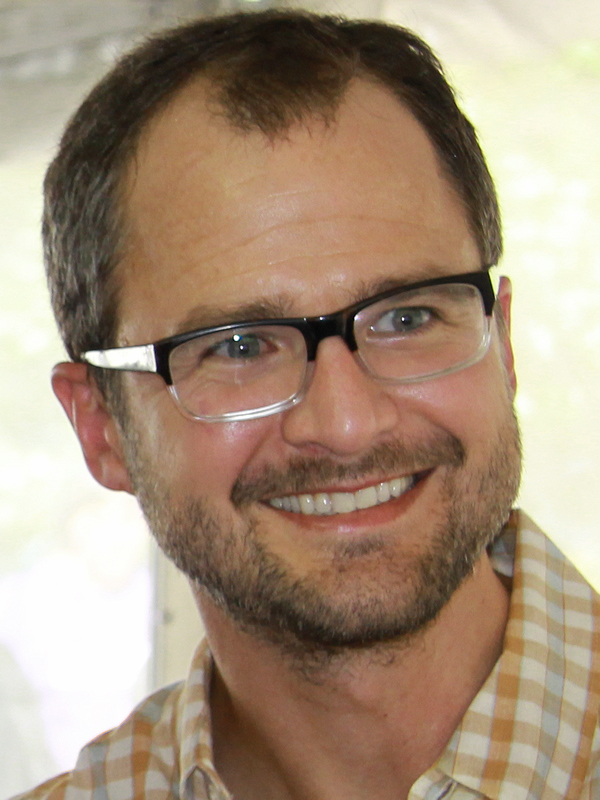
Josh Kilmer-Purcell, The Amazing Race 21

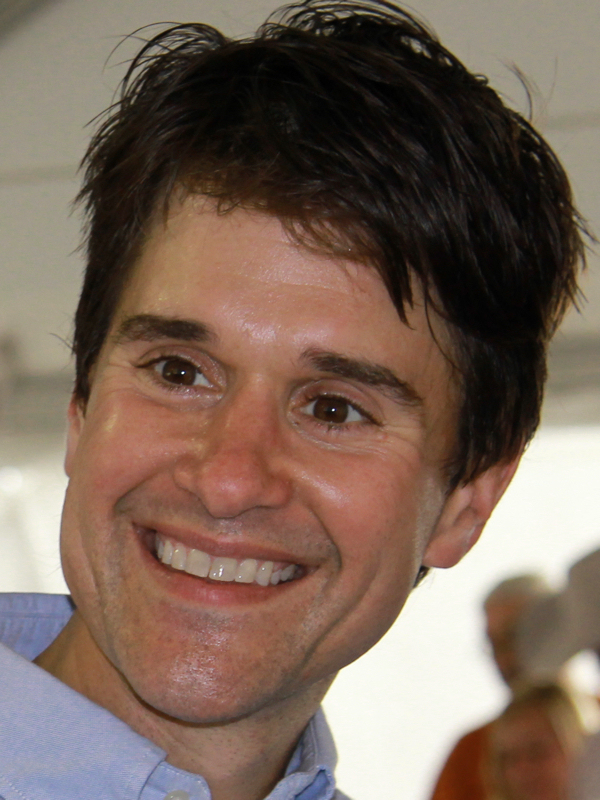
Brent Ridge, The Amazing Race 21

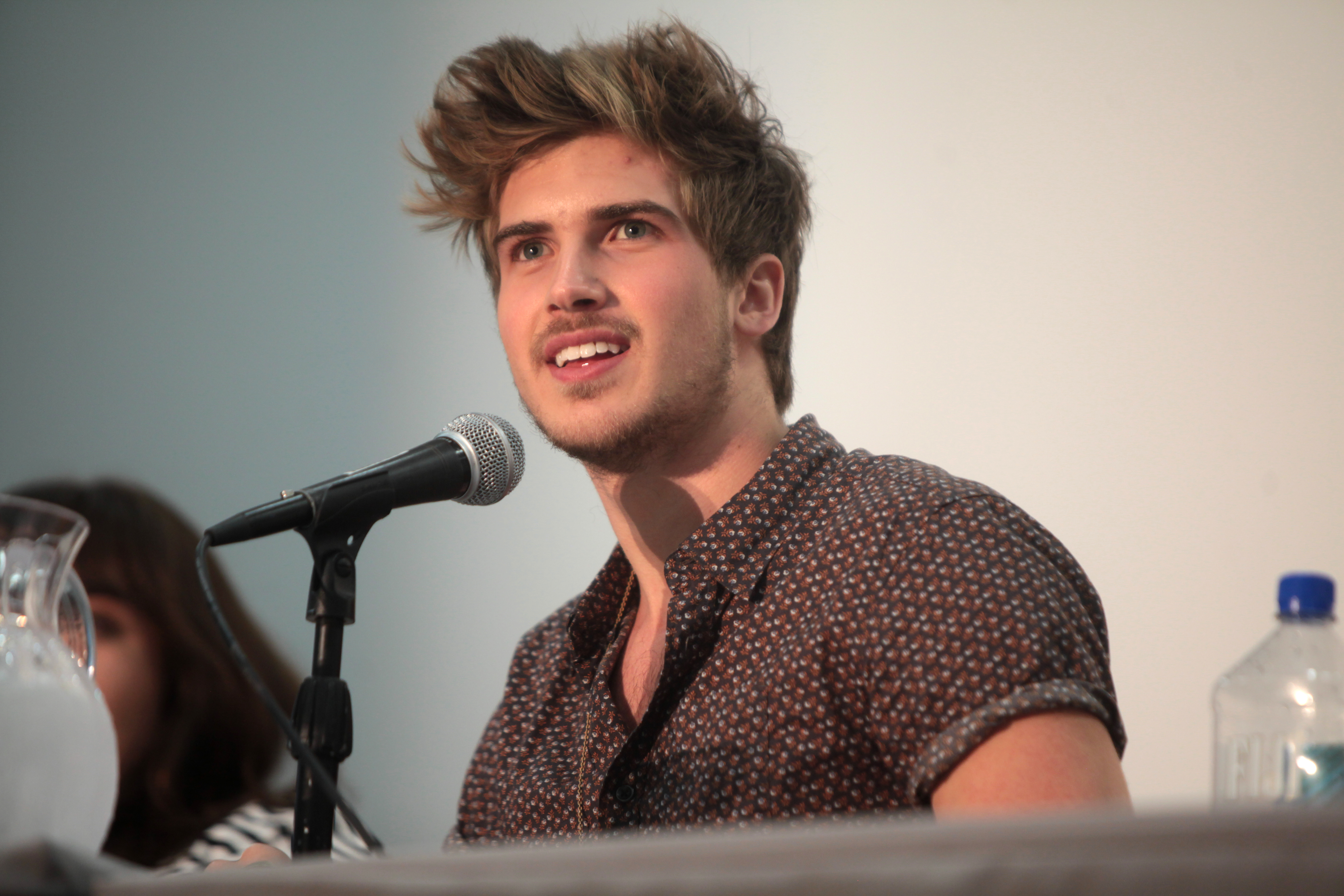
Joey Graceffa, The Amazing Race 22 and The Amazing Race 24: All-Stars

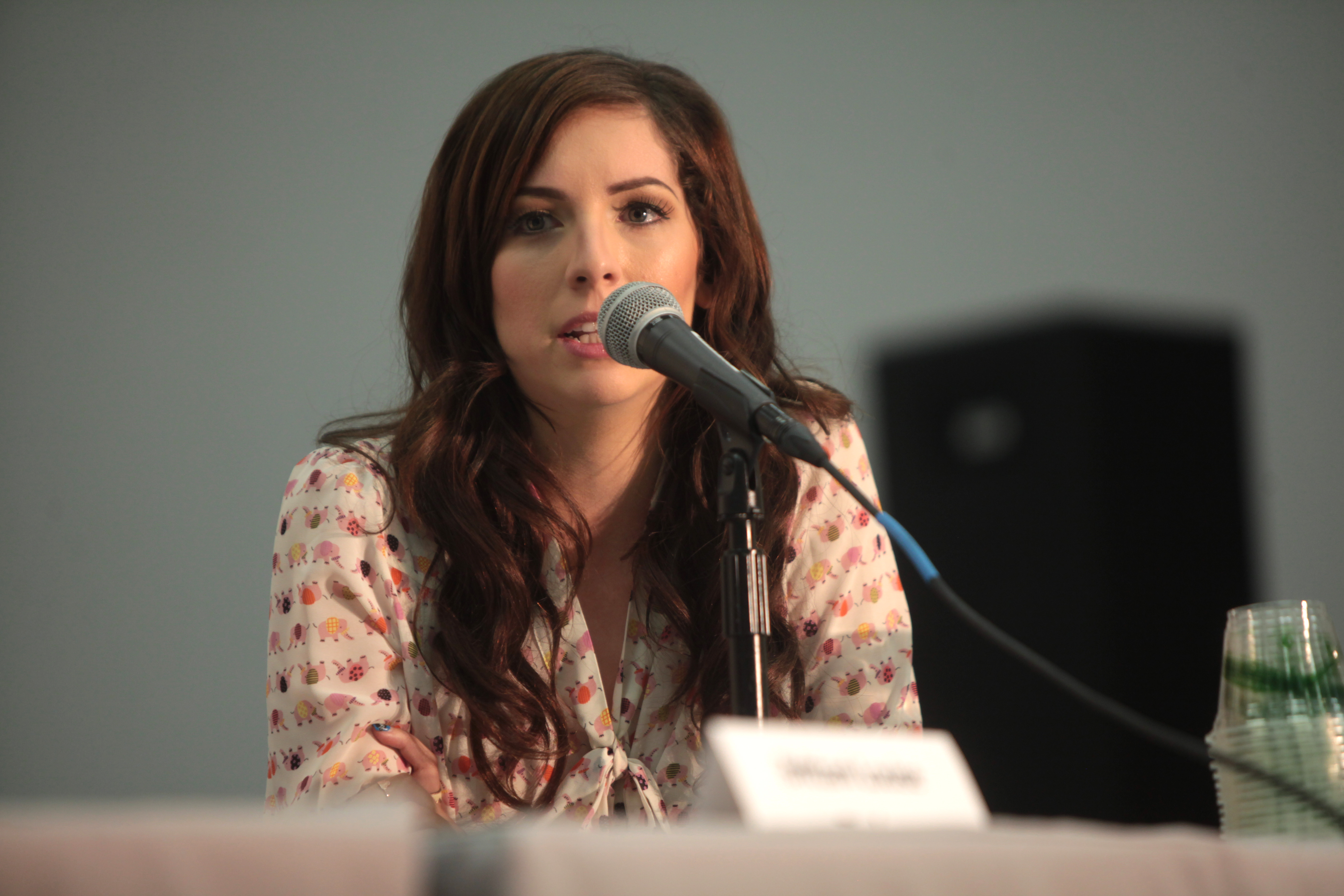
Meghan Camarena, The Amazing Race 22 and The Amazing Race 24: All-Stars

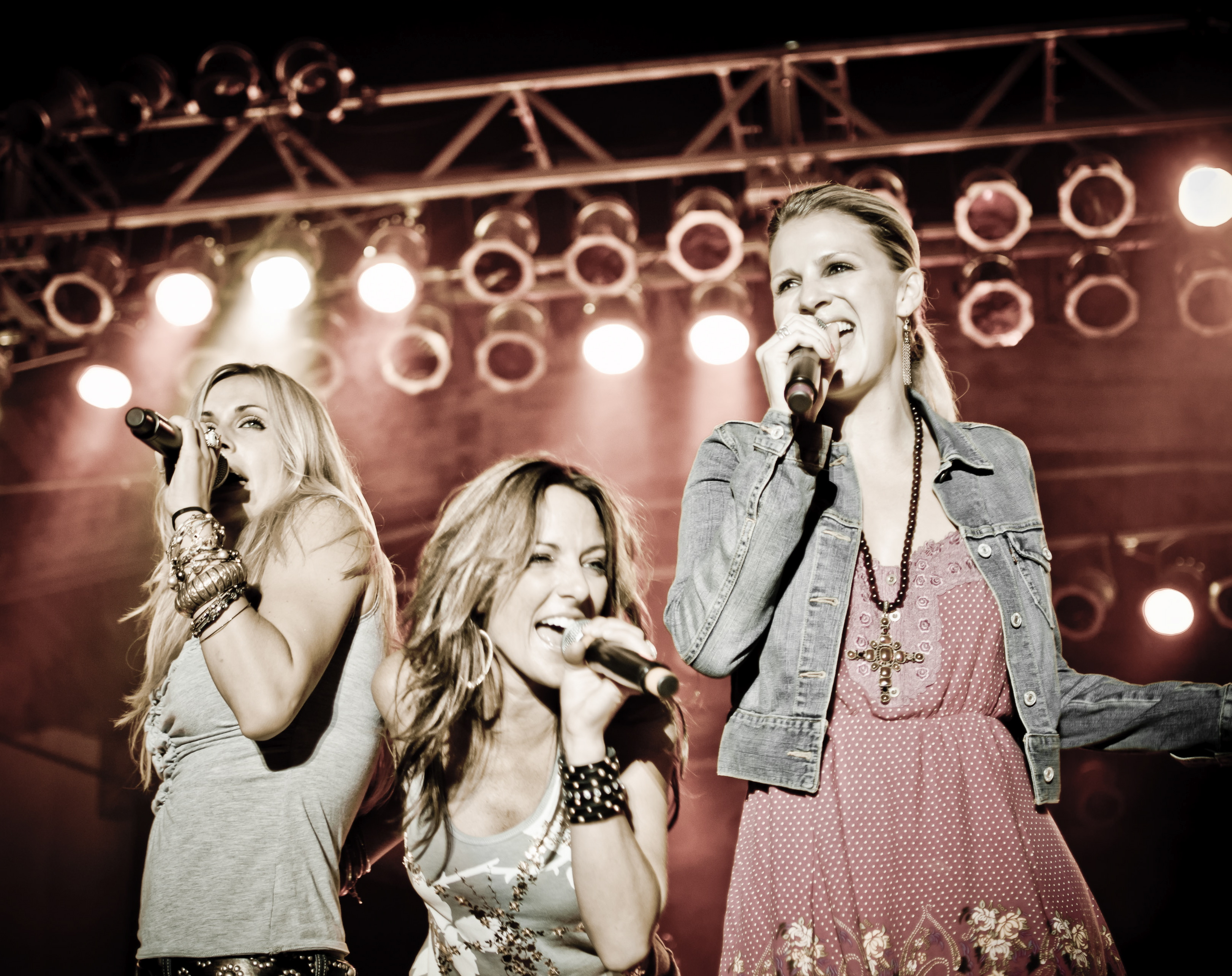
Stealing Angels singers Caroline Cutbirth (left) and Jennifer Kuhle (right), The Amazing Race 22 and The Amazing Race 24: All-Stars

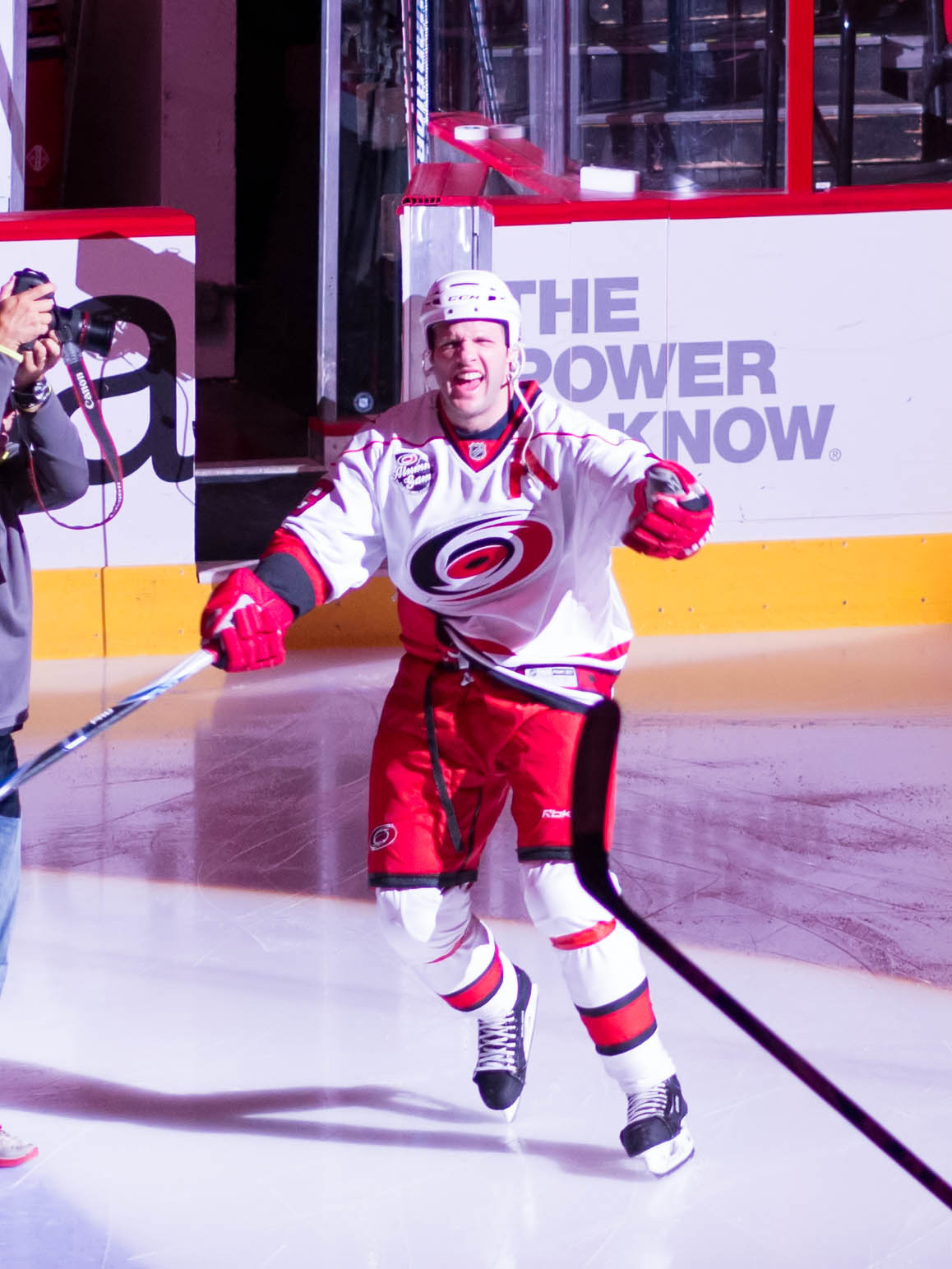
Bates Battaglia, The Amazing Race 22

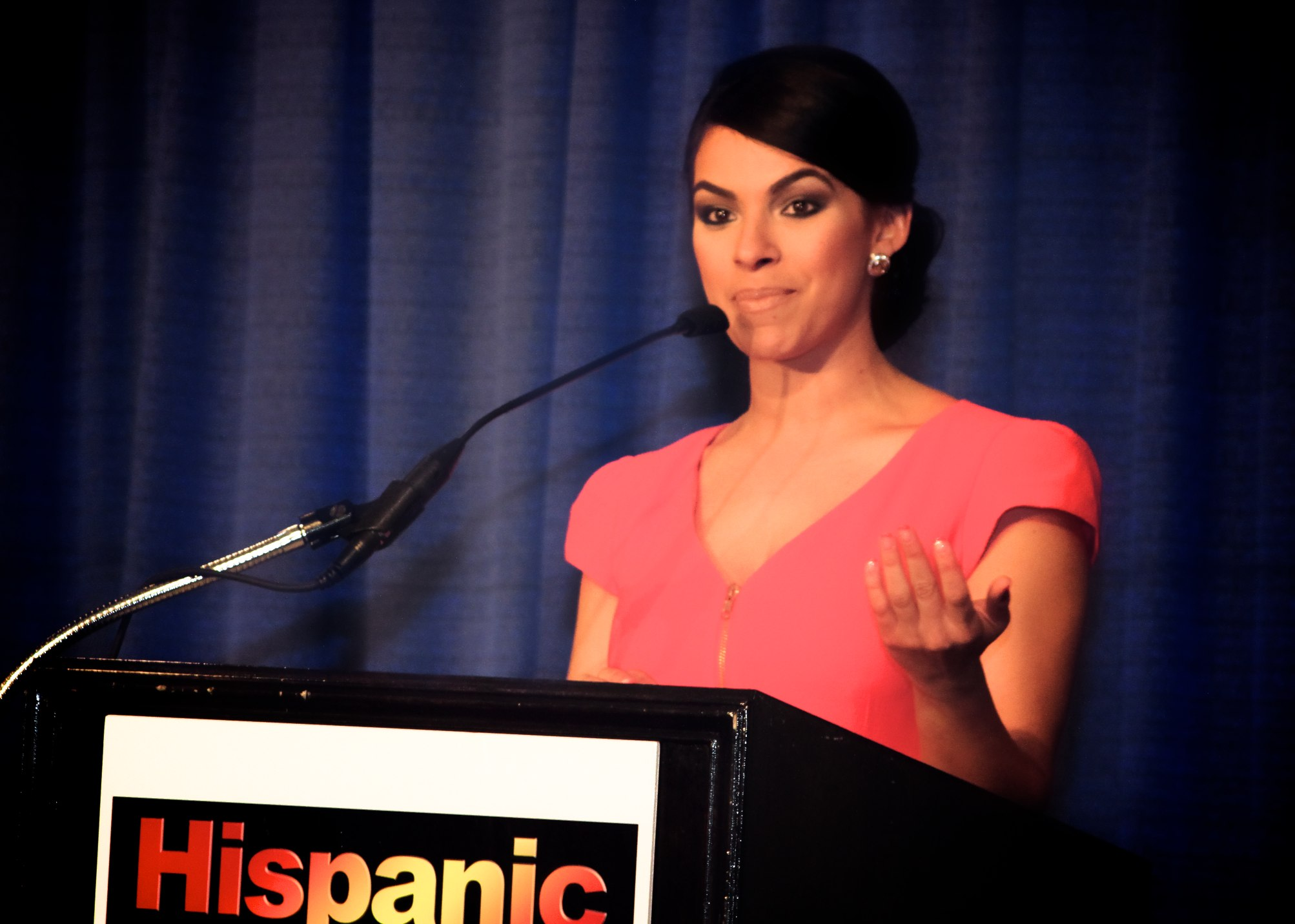
Amy Diaz, The Amazing Race 23

This information was accurate at the time of filming.

Name	Age	Hometown	Season	Finish
Rob Scheer	52	Ketchikan, Alaska	Season 21	11th
Sheila Castle	44	Pigeon Forge, Tennessee	Season 21	11th
Amy Purdy	32	Las Vegas, Nevada	Season 21	10th
Daniel Gale	36	Crested Butte, Colorado	Season 21	10th
Caitlin King	24	St. Louis, Missouri	Season 21	9th
Brittany Fletcher	25	Chicago, Illinois	Season 21	9th
Gary Wojnar	52	Livonia, Michigan	Season 21	8th
Will Chiola	53	Dearborn Heights, Michigan	Season 21	8th
Rob French	46	Boston, Georgia	Season 21	7th
Kelley Carrington-French	50	Boston, Georgia	Season 21	7th
James LoMenzo	53	Burbank, California	Season 21	6th
Mark "Abba" Abbattista	45	Denver, Colorado	Season 21	6th
Abbie Ginsberg	31	Encinitas, California	Season 21	5th
Ryan Danz	35	San Diego, California	Season 21	5th
Natalie Anderson	26	Edgewater, New Jersey	Season 21	4th
Nadiya Anderson	26	Edgewater, New Jersey	Season 21	4th
Trey Wier	23	Austin, Texas	Season 21	3rd
Lexi Beerman	22	Dripping Springs, Texas	Season 21	3rd
Jaymes Vaughan	30	Las Vegas, Nevada	Season 21	2nd
James Davis	27	Las Vegas, Nevada	Season 21	2nd
Josh Kilmer-Purcell	43	Sharon Springs, New York	Season 21	1st
Brent Ridge	38	Sharon Springs, New York	Season 21	1st
Matt Davis	25	Gaffney, South Carolina	Season 22	11th
Daniel Moss	24	Gaffney, South Carolina	Season 22	11th
Idries Abdur-Rahman	36	Chicago, Illinois	Season 22	10th
Jamil Abdur-Rahman	36	Chicago, Illinois	Season 22	10th
Jessica Hoel	26	Huntington Beach, California	Season 22	9th
John Erck	27	Huntington Beach, California	Season 22	9th
Dave O'Leary	58	Salt Lake City, Utah	Season 22	8th
Connor O'Leary	21	Salt Lake City, Utah	Season 22	8th
Pam Chien	29	Los Angeles, California	Season 22	7th
Winnie Sung	29	Los Angeles, California	Season 22	7th
Chuck McCall	46	Daphne, Alabama	Season 22	6th
Wynona McCall	49	Daphne, Alabama	Season 22	6th
Joey Graceffa	21	Los Angeles, California	Season 22	5th
Meghan Camarena	25	Los Angeles, California	Season 22	5th
Caroline Cutbirth	29	Austin, Texas	Season 22	4th
Jennifer Kuhle	30	Nashville, Tennessee	Season 22	4th
Mona Hinman-Egender	33	Castle Pines, Colorado	Season 22	3rd
Beth Bandimere	36	Arvada, Colorado	Season 22	3rd
Max Bichler	30	Buffalo, New York	Season 22	2nd
Katie Kaczor-Bichler	24	Buffalo, New York	Season 22	2nd
Bates Battaglia	36	Raleigh, North Carolina	Season 22	1st
Anthony Battaglia	33	Raleigh, North Carolina	Season 22	1st
Hoskote Venkatesh	60	Laguna Niguel, California	Season 23	11th
Naina Venkatesh	27	Laguna Niguel, California	Season 23	11th
Rowan Joseph	56	Charlotte, North Carolina	Season 23	10th
Shane Partlow	47	Charlotte, North Carolina	Season 23	10th
Chester Pitts II	33	Missouri City, Texas	Season 23	9th
Ephraim Salaam	36	Studio City, California	Season 23	9th
Brandon Squyres	34	Chico, California	Season 23	8th
Adam Switzer	34	Los Angeles, California	Season 23	8th
Tim Wiyninger	26	Cordell, Oklahoma	Season 23	7th
Danny Merkey	25	Cordell, Oklahoma	Season 23	7th
Nicky Getz	27	Kansas City, Missouri	Season 23	6th
Kim DeJesus	32	Chicago, Illinois	Season 23	6th
Ally Mello	22	Los Angeles, California	Season 23	5th
Ashley Covert	25	Los Angeles, California	Season 23	5th
Leo Temory	26	Los Angeles, California	Season 23	4th
Jamal Zadran	26	Los Angeles, California	Season 23	4th
Nicole Jasper	39	Atlanta, Georgia	Season 23	3rd
Travis Jasper	43	Atlanta, Georgia	Season 23	3rd
Tim Sweeney	32	Morristown, New Jersey	Season 23	2nd
Marie Mazzocchi	29	Morristown, New Jersey	Season 23	2nd
Jason Case	33	Attleboro, Massachusetts	Season 23	1st
Amy Diaz	29	Providence, Rhode Island	Season 23	1st
Natalie Anderson	27	Edgewater, New Jersey	Season 24 (All-Stars)	11th
Nadiya Anderson	27	Edgewater, New Jersey	Season 24 (All-Stars)	11th
Mark Jackson	47	Manchester, Kentucky	Season 24 (All-Stars)	10th
Mallory Ervin	28	Nashville, Tennessee	Season 24 (All-Stars)	10th
Joey Graceffa	22	Los Angeles, California	Season 24 (All-Stars)	9th
Meghan Camarena	26	Los Angeles, California	Season 24 (All-Stars)	9th
Margie O'Donnell	56	Colorado Springs, Colorado	Season 24 (All-Stars)	8th
Luke Adams	28	Philadelphia, Pennsylvania	Season 24 (All-Stars)	8th
Jessica Hoel	27	Eden Prairie, Minnesota	Season 24 (All-Stars)	7th
John Erck	28	Mora, Minnesota	Season 24 (All-Stars)	7th
Herbert "Flight Time" Lang	37	Brinkley, Arkansas	Season 24 (All-Stars)	6th
Nathaniel "Big Easy" Lofton	32	New Orleans, Louisiana	Season 24 (All-Stars)	6th
Jet McCoy	34	Ada, Oklahoma	Season 24 (All-Stars)	5th
Cord McCoy	33	Tupelo, Oklahoma	Season 24 (All-Stars)	5th
Leo Temory	27	Torrance, California	Season 24 (All-Stars)	4th
Jamal Zadran	26	Irvine, California	Season 24 (All-Stars)	4th
Brendon Villegas	33	Los Angeles, California	Season 24 (All-Stars)	3rd
Rachel Reilly	29	Los Angeles, California	Season 24 (All-Stars)	3rd
Caroline Cutbirth	30	Waco, Texas	Season 24 (All-Stars)	2nd
Jennifer Wayne	31	Nashville, Tennessee	Season 24 (All-Stars)	2nd
Dave O'Leary	59	Salt Lake City, Utah	Season 24 (All-Stars)	1st
Connor O'Leary	22	Salt Lake City, Utah	Season 24 (All-Stars)	1st

== Seasons 25–28 (2014–2016) ==
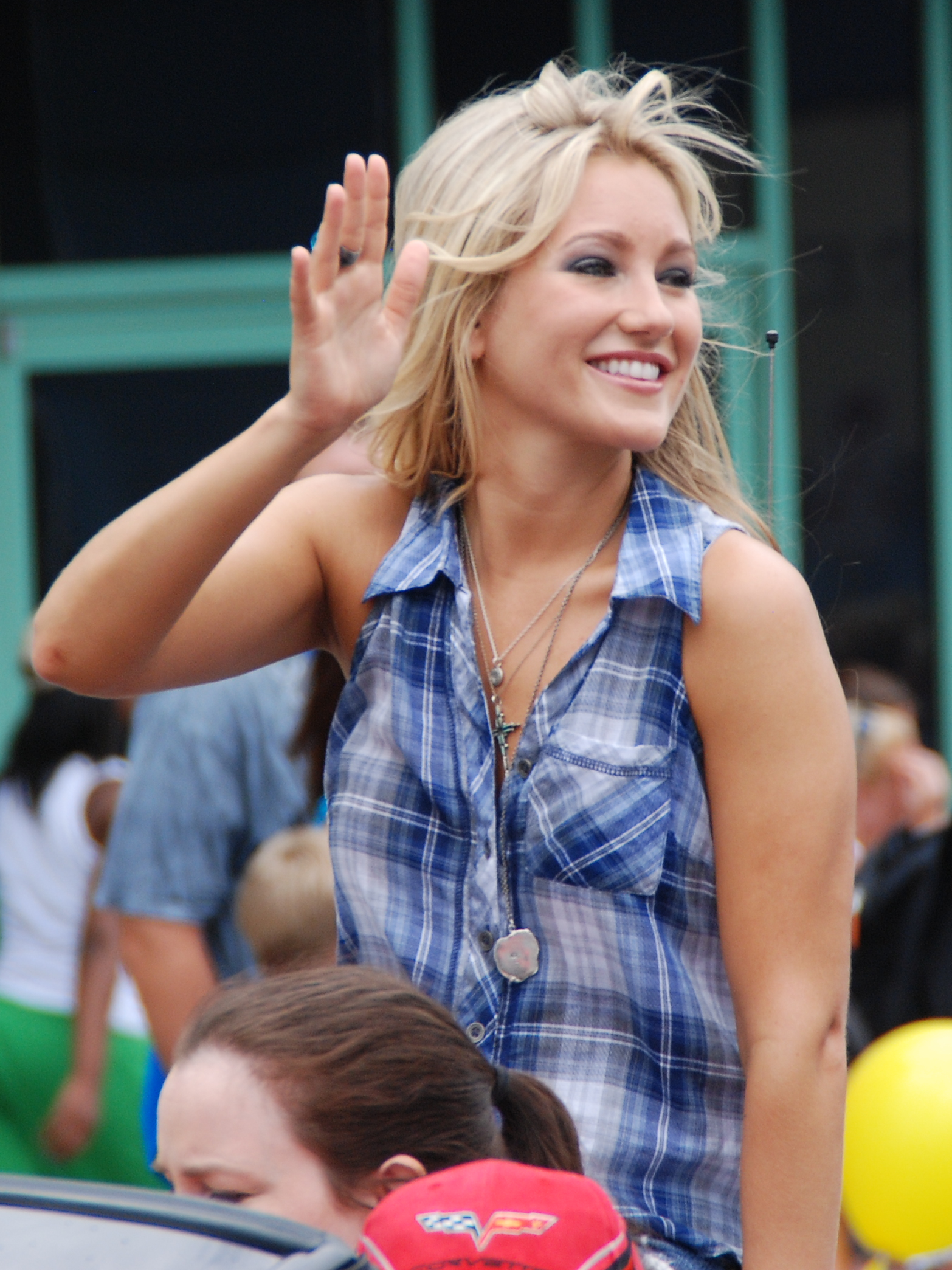
Whitney Duncan, The Amazing Race 25

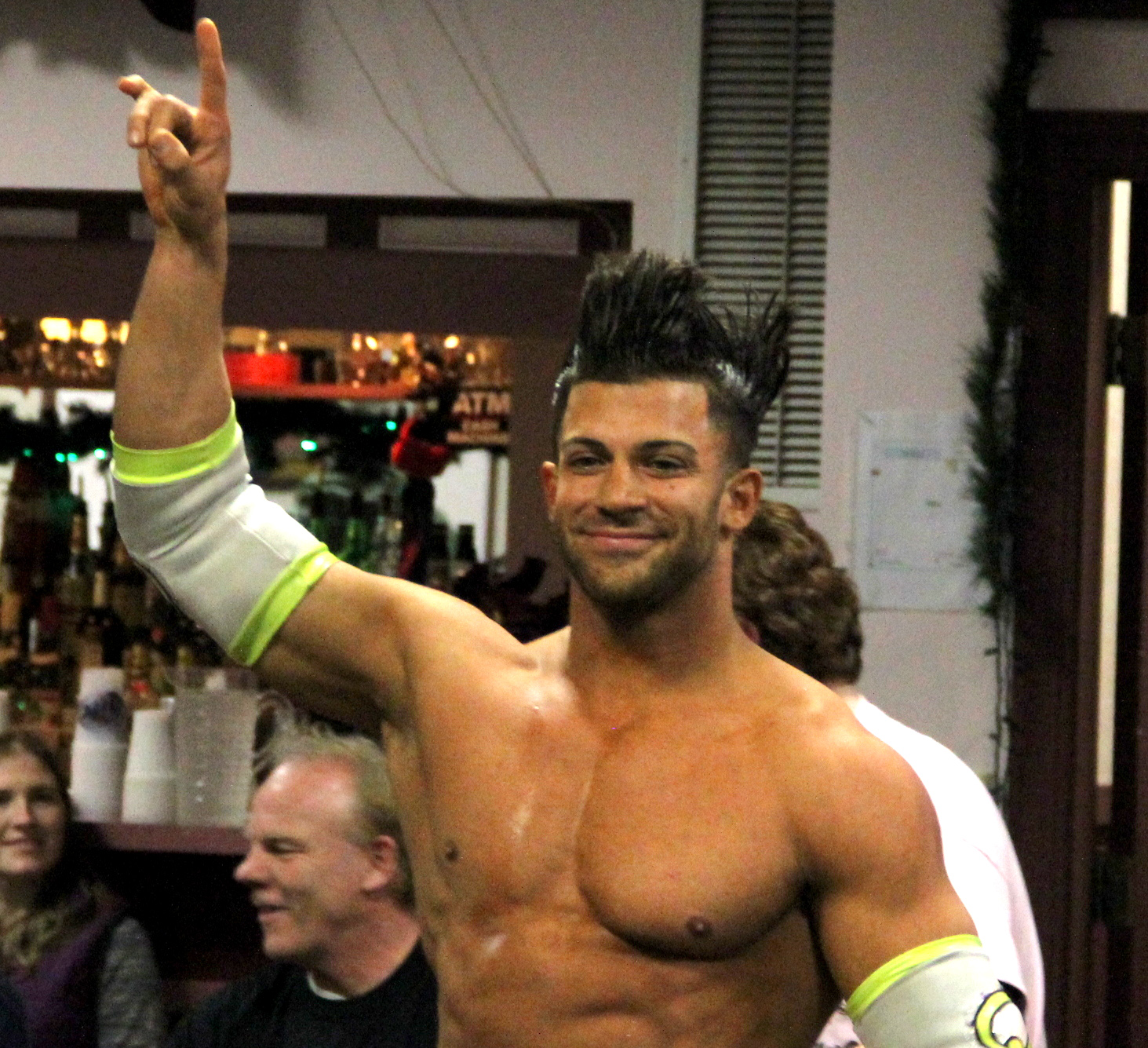
Robbie E, The Amazing Race 25

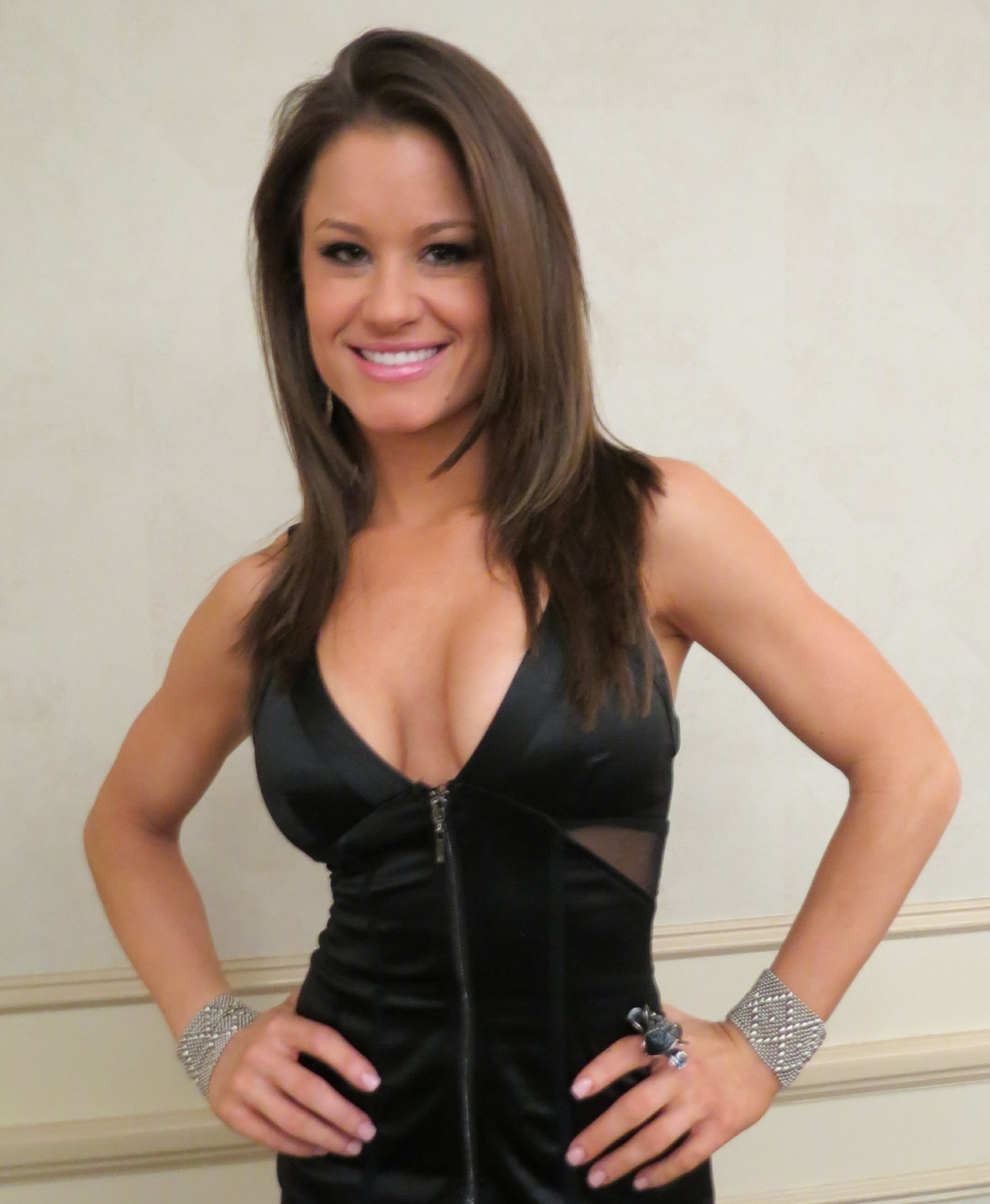
Brooke Adams, The Amazing Race 25

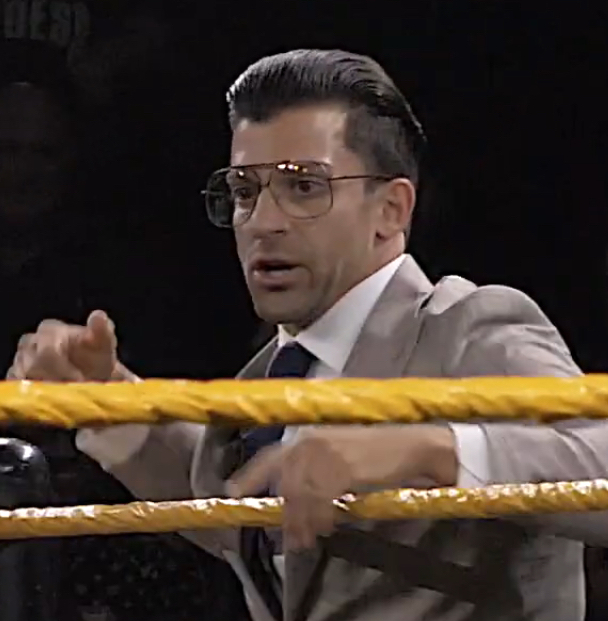
Robert Strauss, The Amazing Race 25

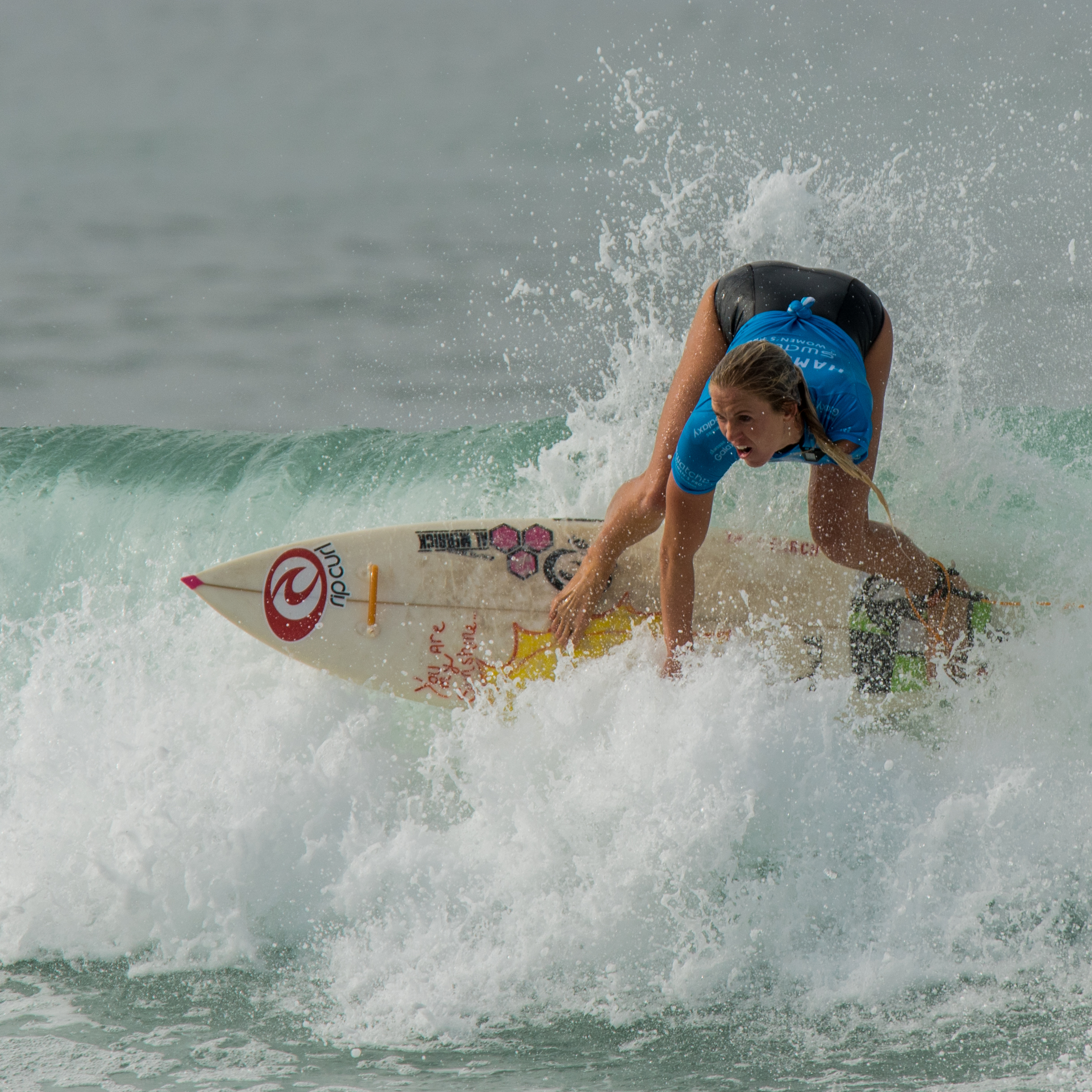
Bethany Hamilton, The Amazing Race 25

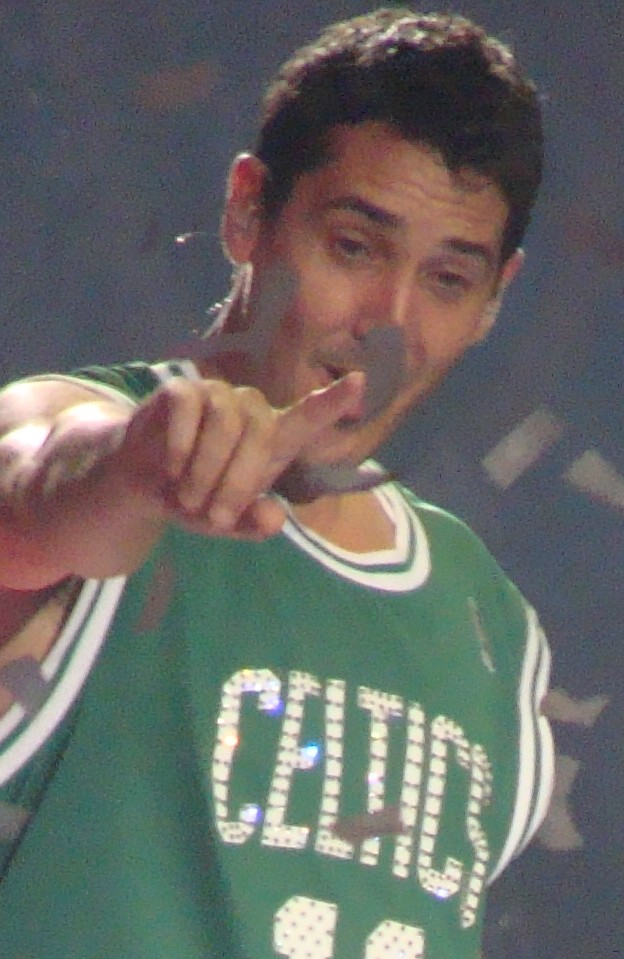
Jonathan Knight, The Amazing Race 26

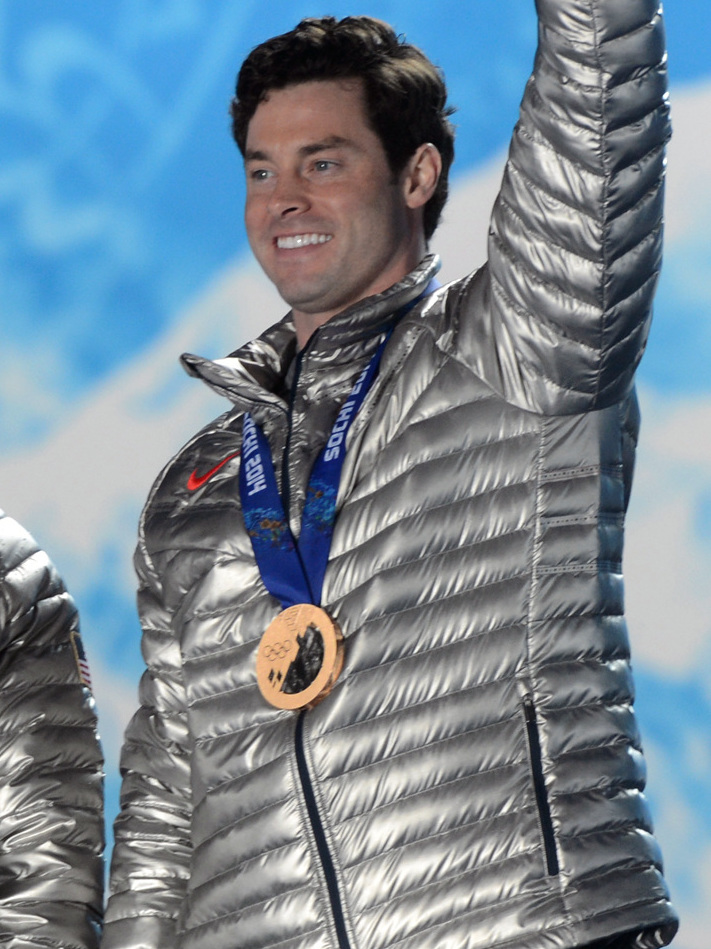
Steven Langton, The Amazing Race 26

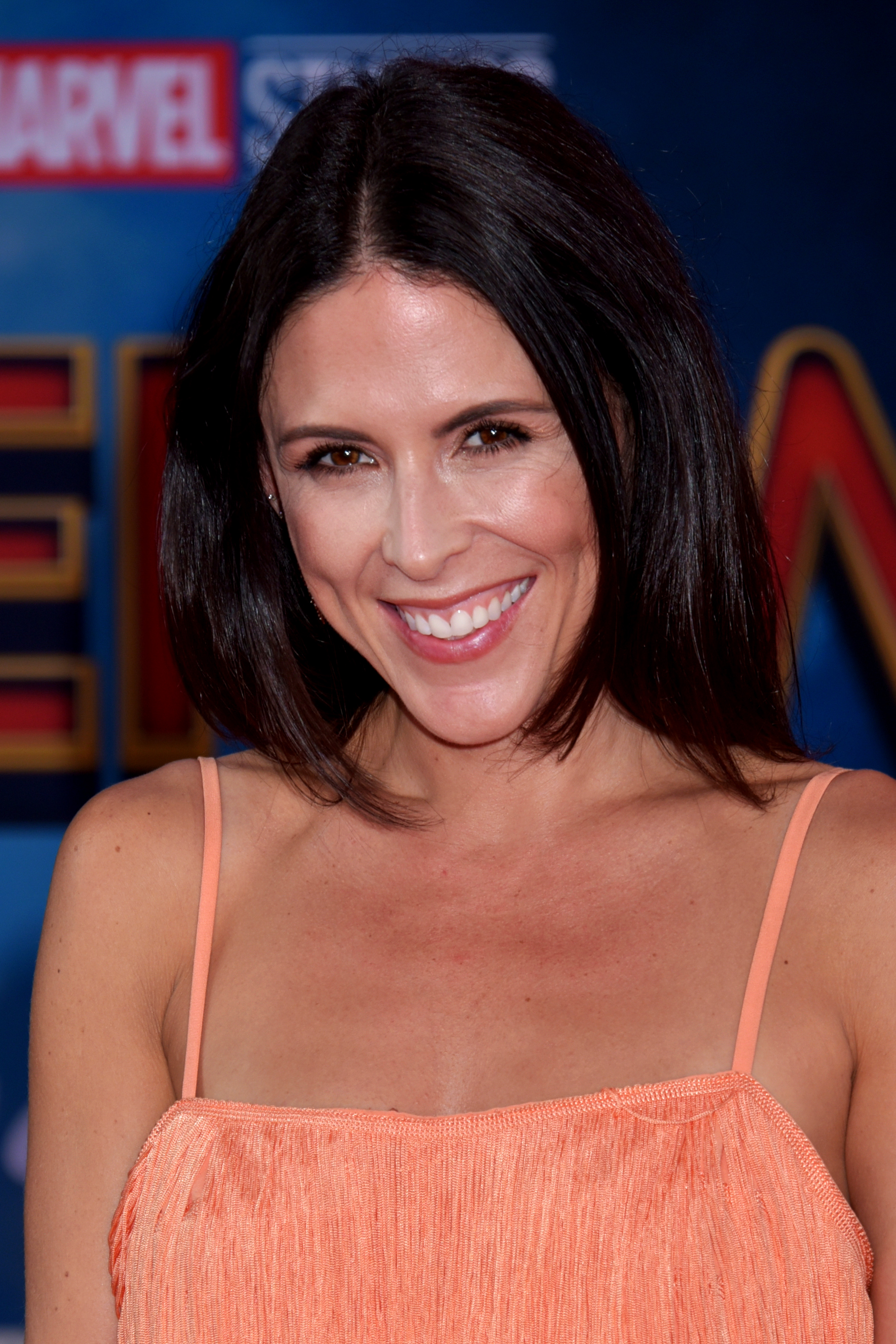
Joslyn Davis, The Amazing Race 28

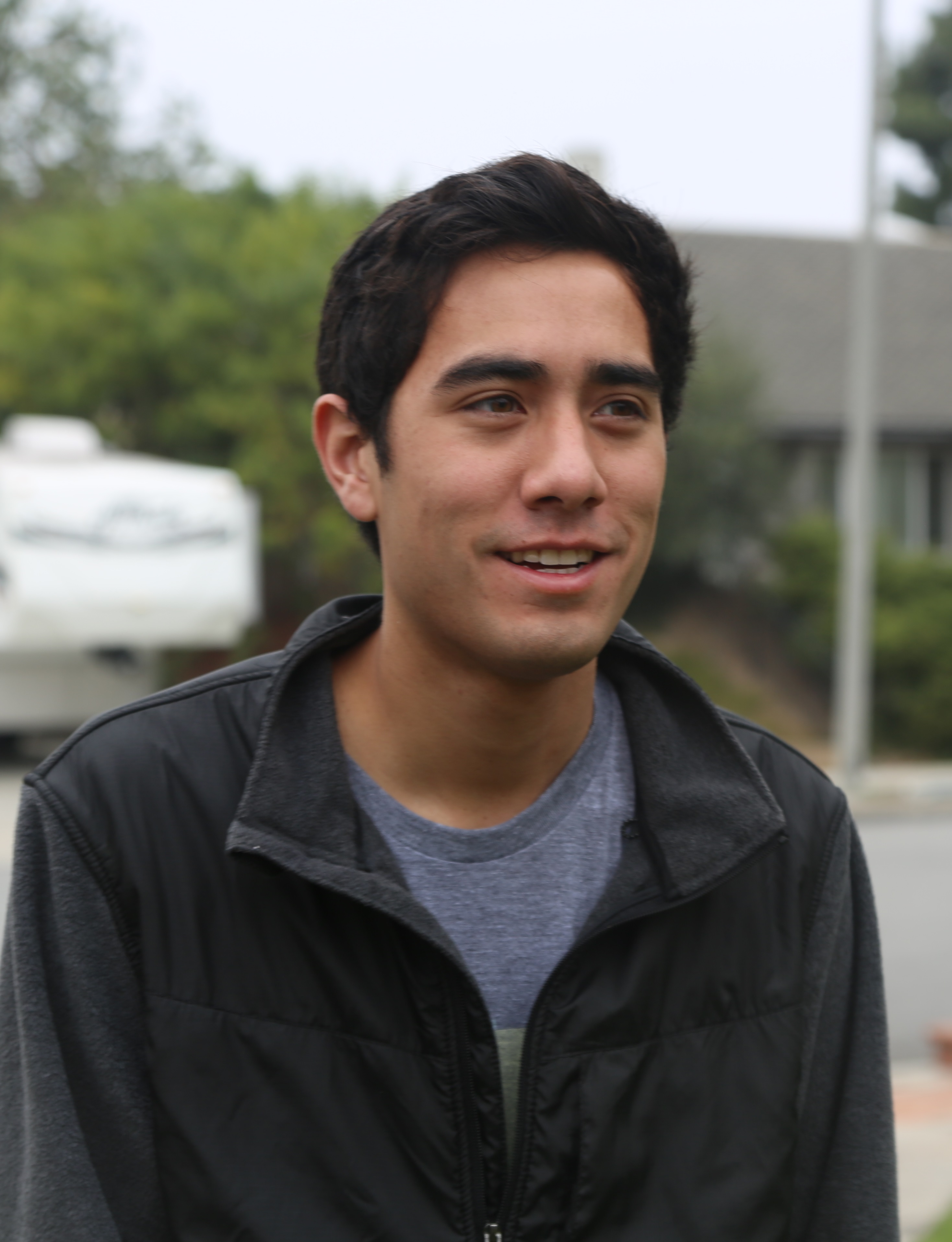
Zach King, The Amazing Race 28

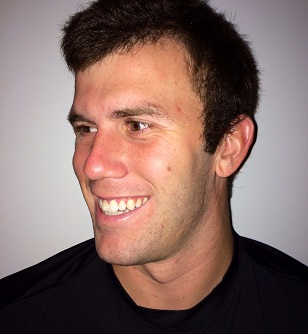
Brodie Smith, The Amazing Race 28

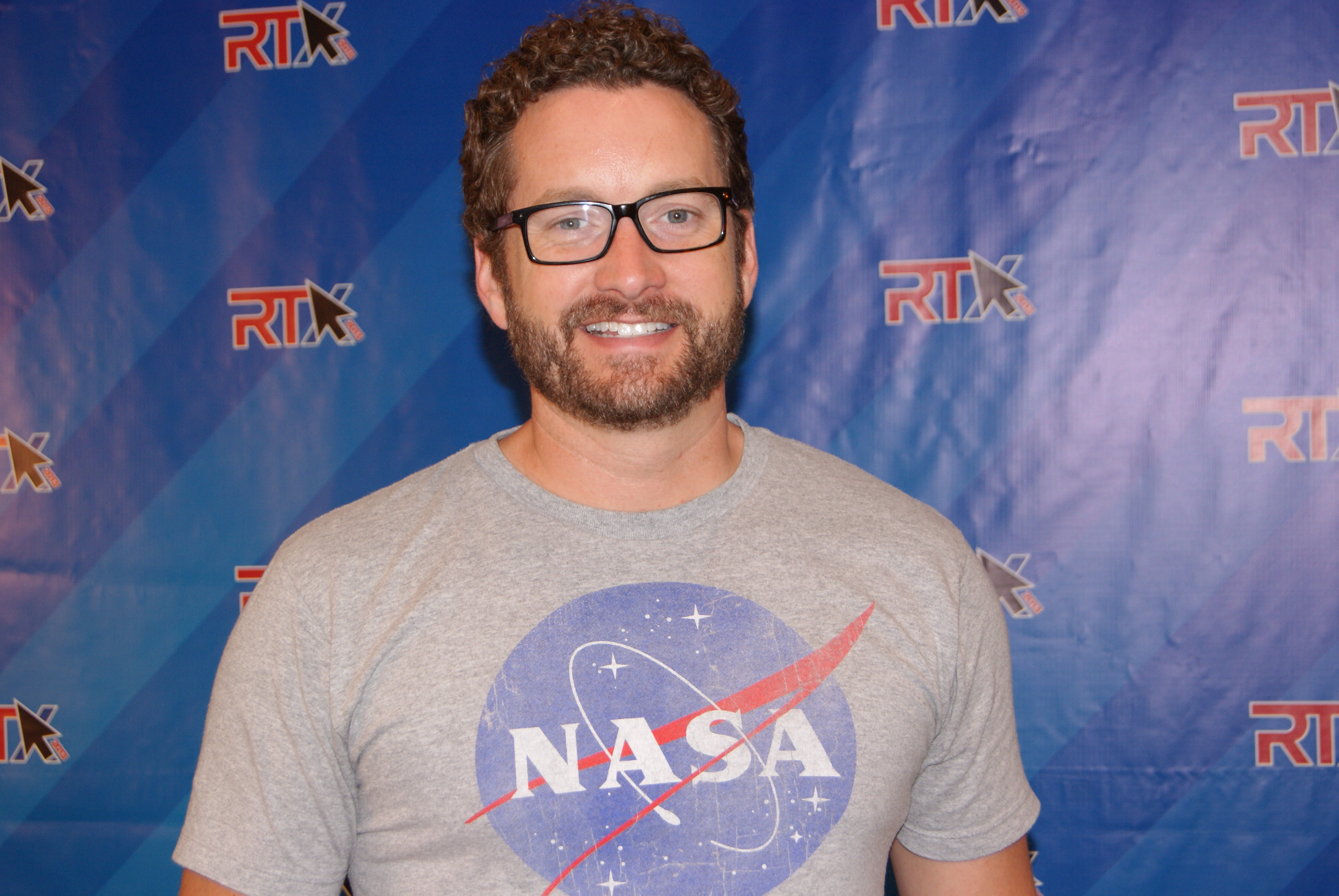
Burnie Burns, The Amazing Race 28

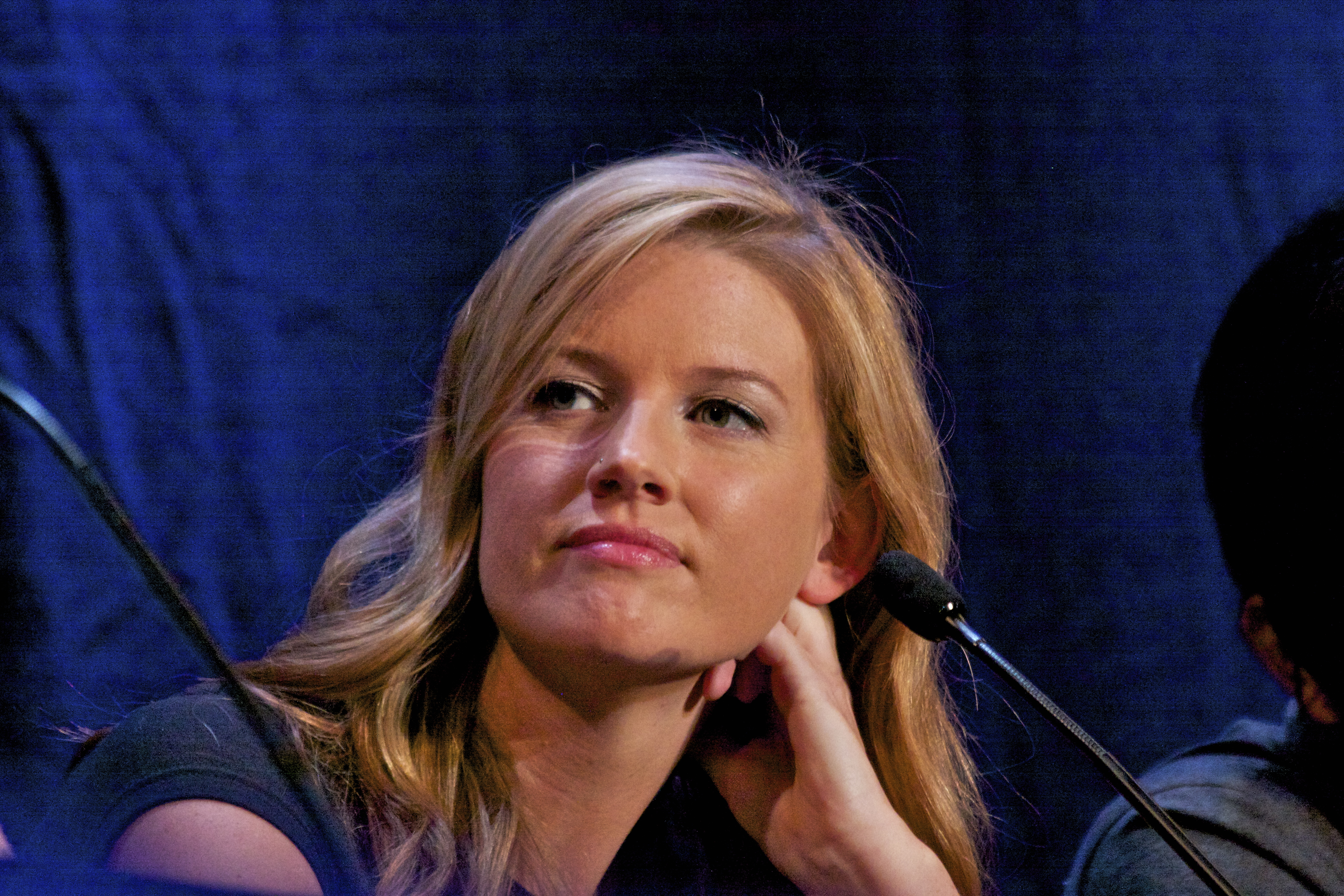
Ashley Jenkins, The Amazing Race 28

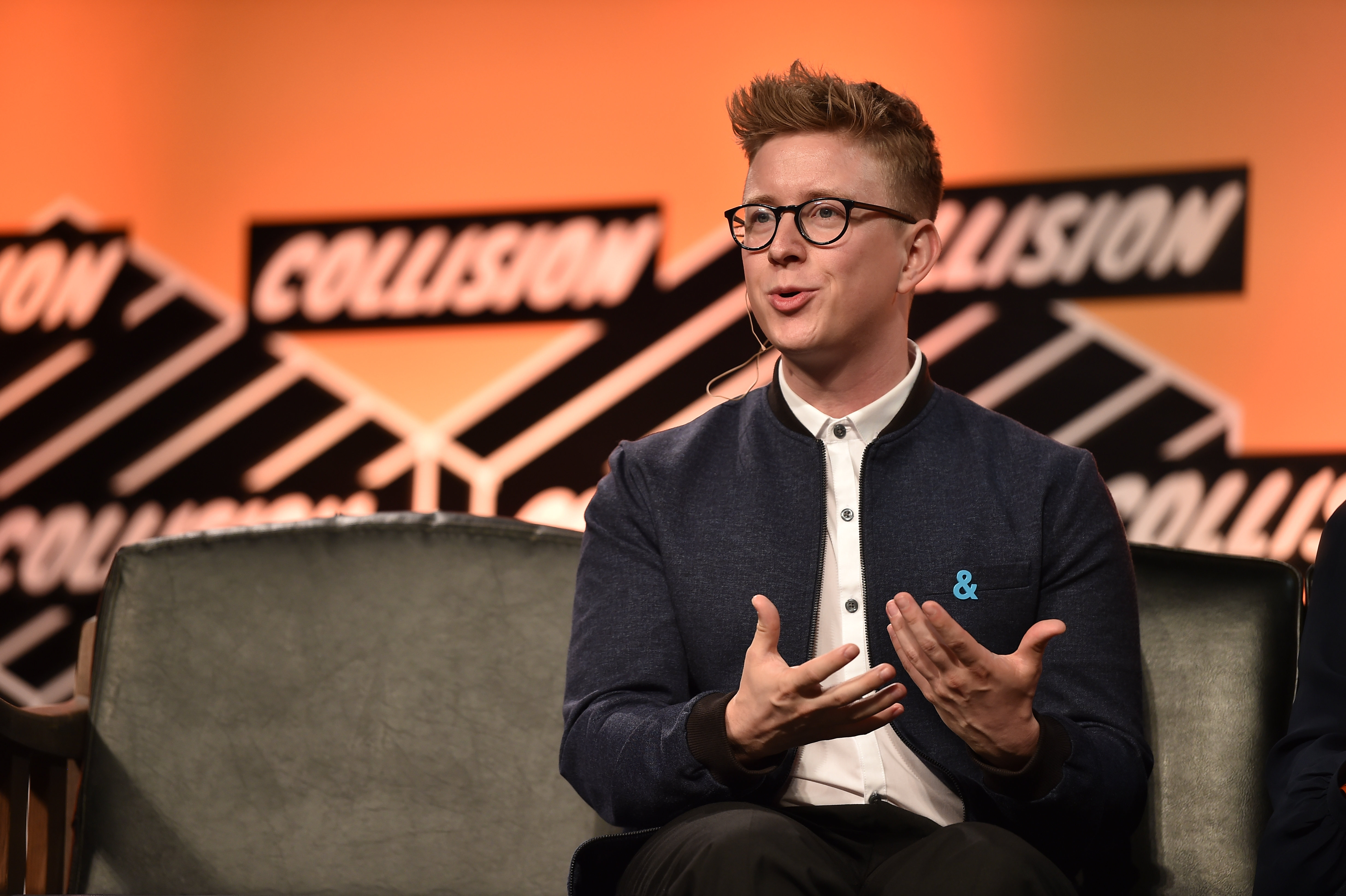
Tyler Oakley, The Amazing Race 28

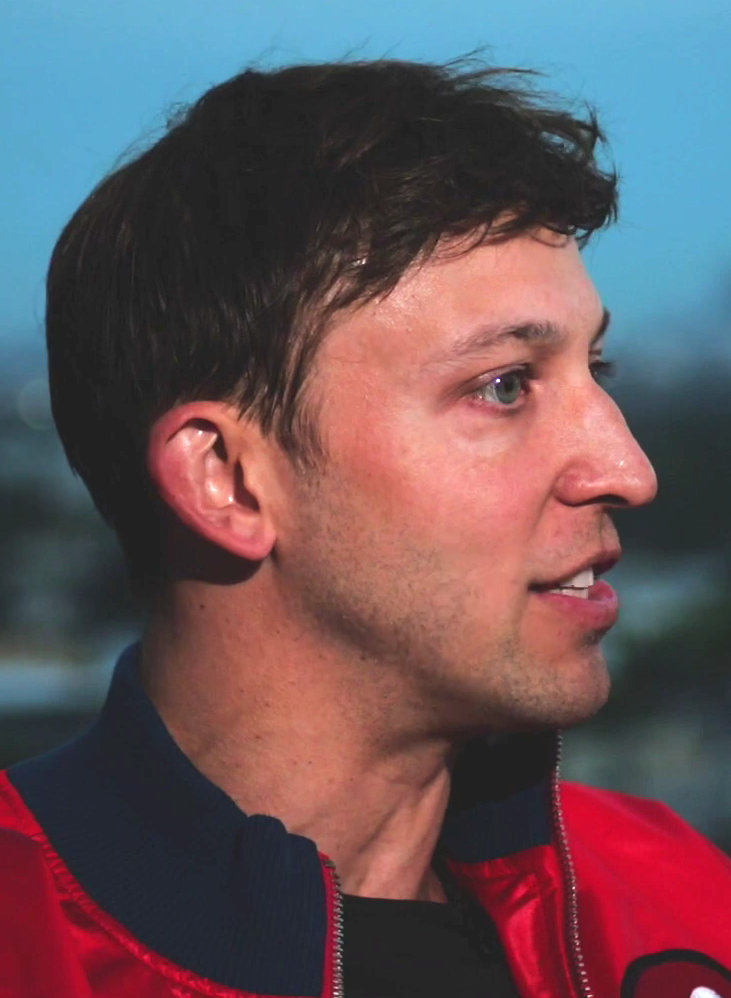
Matt Steffanina, The Amazing Race 28

This information was accurate at the time of filming.

Name	Age	Hometown	Season	Finish
Lisa Thomson	28	Miami, Florida	Season 25	11th
Michelle Thomson	22	Miami, Florida	Season 25	11th
Dennis Hour	30	Tustin, California	Season 25	10th
Isabelle Du	28	Tustin, California	Season 25	10th
Michael Ward	40	Boston, Massachusetts	Season 25	9th
Scott Strazzullo	39	Boston, Massachusetts	Season 25	9th
Keith Tollefson	29	Nashville, Tennessee	Season 25	8th
Whitney Duncan	29	Nashville, Tennessee	Season 25	8th
Shelley Porter	42	Detroit, Michigan	Season 25	7th
Nici Porter	24	Detroit, Michigan	Season 25	7th
Tim Tsao	23	Pasadena, California	Season 25	6th
Te Jay McGrath	24	Pasadena, California	Season 25	6th
Kym Perfetto	30	Brooklyn, New York	Season 25	5th
Alli Forsythe	26	Brooklyn, New York	Season 25	5th
Brooke Adams	29	Houston, Texas	Season 25	4th
Robert Strauss	30	Woodbridge, New Jersey	Season 25	4th
Adam Dirks	26	Princeville, Hawaii	Season 25	3rd
Bethany Hamilton	24	Princeville, Hawaii	Season 25	3rd
Misti Raman	36	Columbia, South Carolina	Season 25	2nd
Jim Raman	37	Columbia, South Carolina	Season 25	2nd
Amy DeJong	24	Madison, Wisconsin	Season 25	1st
Maya Warren	29	Madison, Wisconsin	Season 25	1st
Jeff Magee	57	McCall, Idaho	Season 26	11th
Lyda Grawn	49	Scottsdale, Arizona	Season 26	11th
Libby Simpson	25	Tuskegee, Alabama	Season 26	10th
CJ Harris	26	Tuskegee, Alabama	Season 26	10th
Harley Rodriguez	41	New York, New York	Season 26	9th
Jonathan Knight	46	New York, New York	Season 26	9th
Bergen Olson	23	Sunnyvale, California	Season 26	8th
Kurt Belcher	24	Butler, Kentucky	Season 26	8th
Jeff Weldon	26	Tampa, Florida	Season 26	7th
Jackie Ibarra	27	Las Vegas, Nevada	Season 26	7th
Alyson Dudek	24	Milwaukee, Wisconsin	Season 26	6th
Steven Langton	31	Boston, Massachusetts	Season 26	6th
Matt Cucolo	30	Scarsdale, New York	Season 26	5th
Ashley Gordon	28	Scarsdale, New York	Season 26	5th
Mike Dombrowski	26	Traverse City, Michigan	Season 26	4th
Rochelle Nevedal	29	Kalkaska, Michigan	Season 26	4th
Hayley Keel	28	Saint Petersburg, Florida	Season 26	3rd
Blair Townsend	31	Amelia Island, Florida	Season 26	3rd
Jelani Roy	32	New York, New York	Season 26	2nd
Jenny Wu	32	Los Angeles, California	Season 26	2nd
Laura Pierson	29	Los Angeles, California	Season 26	1st
Tyler Adams	26	Santa Monica, California	Season 26	1st
Kelly Berning	37	Los Angeles, California	Season 27	11th
Shevonne Sullivan	31	Los Angeles, California	Season 27	11th
Alex Manard	22	Champaign, Illinois	Season 27	10th
Adam Dingeman	24	Des Moines, Iowa	Season 27	10th
Ernest "E-Knock" Phillips	29	Boston, Massachusetts	Season 27	9th
Jayjion "Jin Lao" Greer	26	Boston, Massachusetts	Season 27	9th
Jazmine Lewis	23	Los Angeles, California	Season 27	8th
Danielle Littleton	23	Los Angeles, California	Season 27	8th
Cindy Chac	36	San Diego, California	Season 27	7th
Rick Chac	38	San Diego, California	Season 27	7th
Tanner Kloven	26	Dallas, Texas	Season 27	6th
Josh Ahern	28	Dallas, Texas	Season 27	6th
Denise Williams	51	Prattville, Alabama	Season 27	5th
James Earl Corley	26	Prattville, Alabama	Season 27	5th
Tiffany Torres	28	Hoboken, New Jersey	Season 27	4th
Krista DeBono	28	Staten Island, New York	Season 27	4th
Logan Fazio	36	Miami Beach, Florida	Season 27	3rd
Chris Gordon	46	Miami Beach, Florida	Season 27	3rd
Justin Scheman	39	Philadelphia, Pennsylvania	Season 27	2nd
Diana Bishop	30	Philadelphia, Pennsylvania	Season 27	2nd
Kelsey Gerckens	25	Santa Barbara, California	Season 27	1st
Joey Buttitta	26	Santa Barbara, California	Season 27	1st
Marty Cobb	51	McKinney, Texas	Season 28	11th
Hagan Parkman	22	McKinney, Texas	Season 28	11th
Darius Benson	22	Tuscaloosa, Alabama	Season 28	10th
Cameron Benson	19	Memphis, Tennessee	Season 28	10th
Brittany Oldehoff	26	Fort Lauderdale, Florida	Season 28	9th
Jessica VerSteeg	28	San Francisco, California	Season 28	9th
Erin White Robinson	31	Los Angeles, California	Season 28	8th
Joslyn Davis	33	Los Angeles, California	Season 28	8th
Scott Fowler	58	Kingsport, Tennessee	Season 28	7th
Blair Fowler	22	San Diego, California	Season 28	7th
Zach King	25	Los Angeles, California	Season 28	6th
Rachel King	25	Los Angeles, California	Season 28	6th
Brodie Smith	28	Dallas, Texas	Season 28	5th
Kurt Gibson	30	Dallas, Texas	Season 28	5th
Burnie Burns	42	Austin, Texas	Season 28	4th
Ashley Jenkins	33	Austin, Texas	Season 28	4th
Tyler Oakley	26	Jackson, Mississippi	Season 28	3rd
Korey Kuhl	30	Jackson, Mississippi	Season 28	3rd
Sheri LaBrant	45	Enterprise, Alabama	Season 28	2nd
Cole LaBrant	19	Enterprise, Alabama	Season 28	2nd
Dana Alexa Borriello	29	Los Angeles, California	Season 28	1st
Matt Steffanina	30	Los Angeles, California	Season 28	1st

== Seasons 29–32 (2017–2020) ==
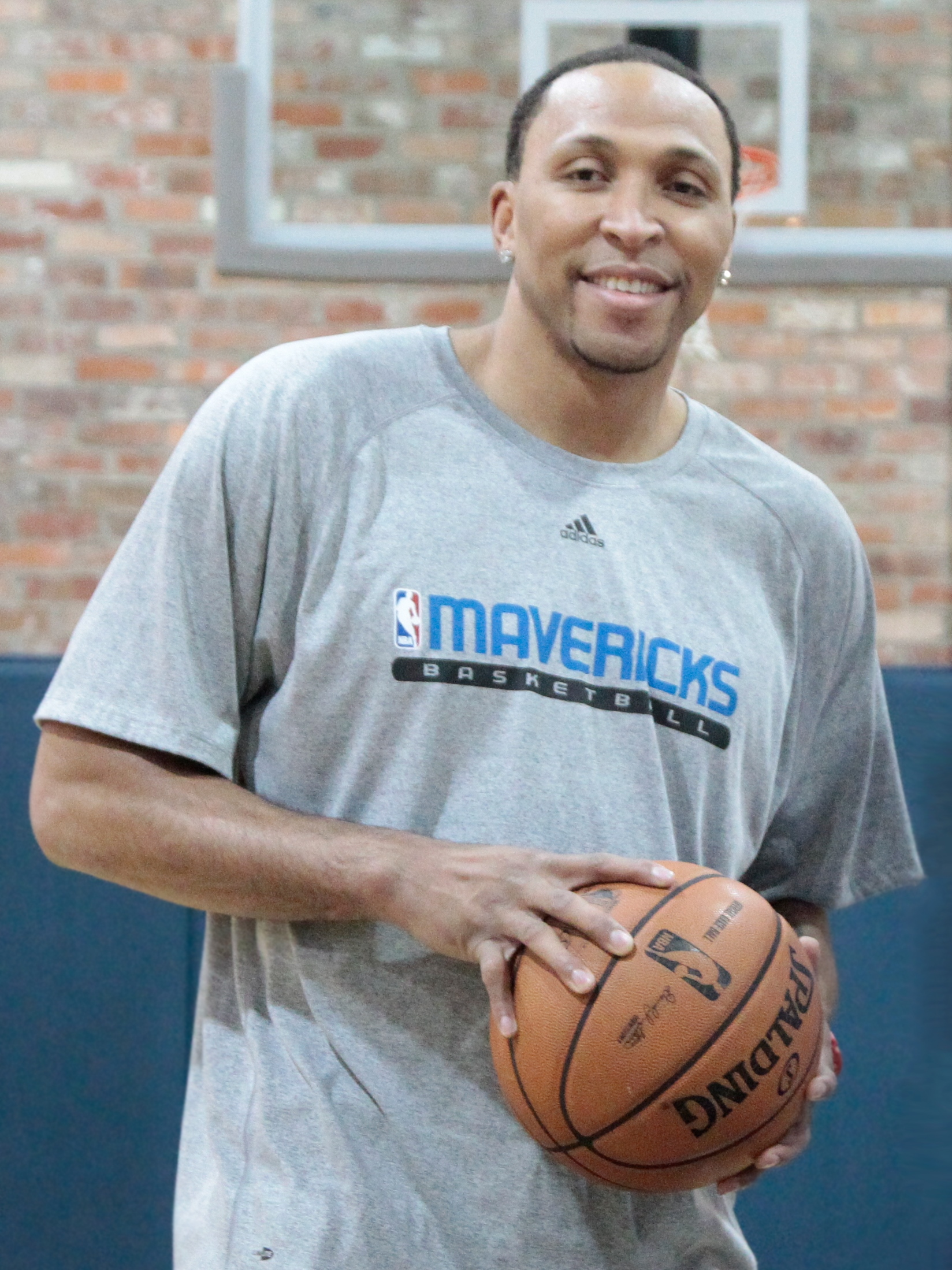
Shawn Marion, The Amazing Race 30

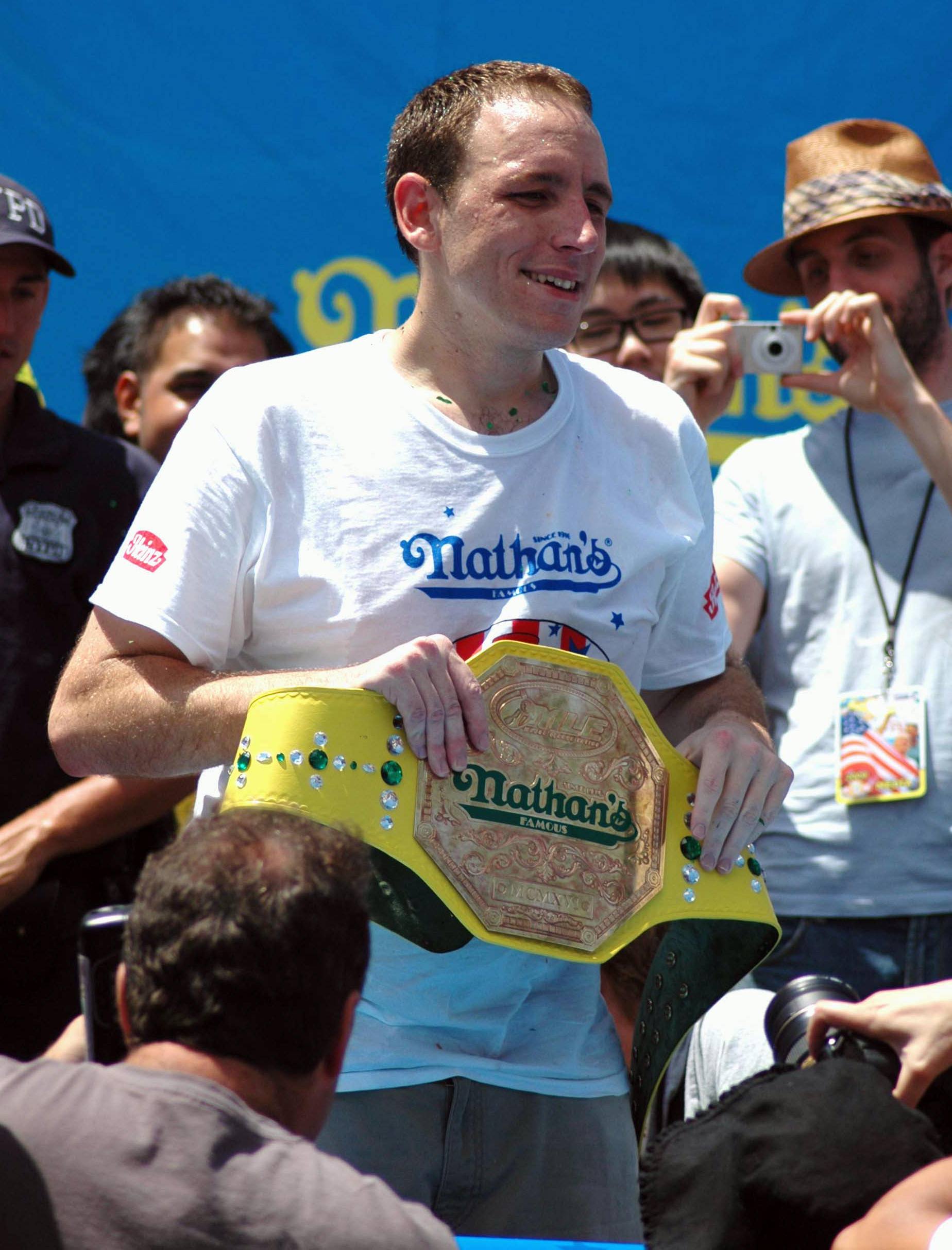
Joey Chestnut, The Amazing Race 30

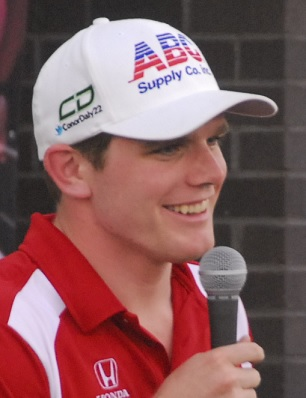
Conor Daly, The Amazing Race 30

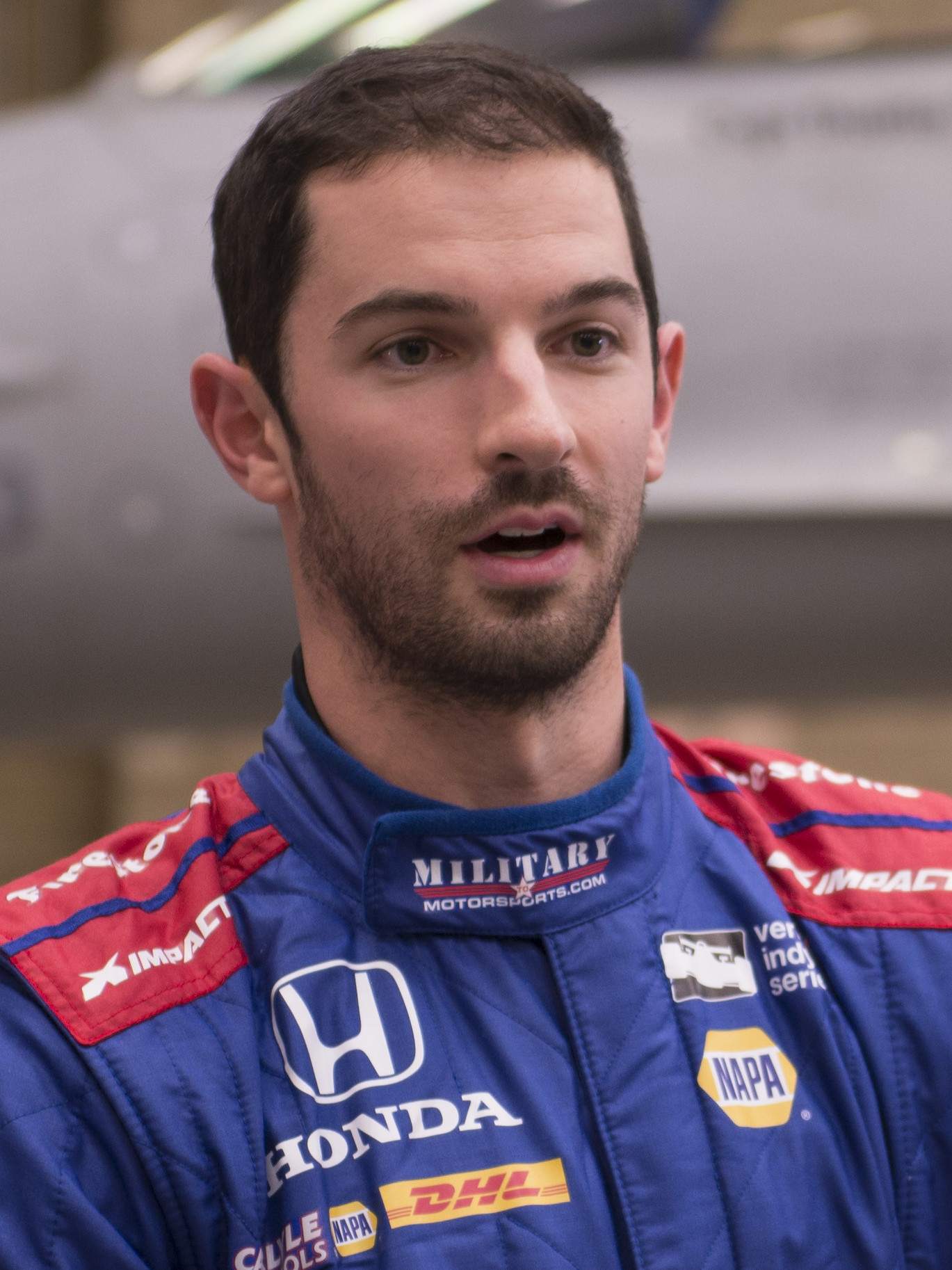
Alexander Rossi, The Amazing Race 30

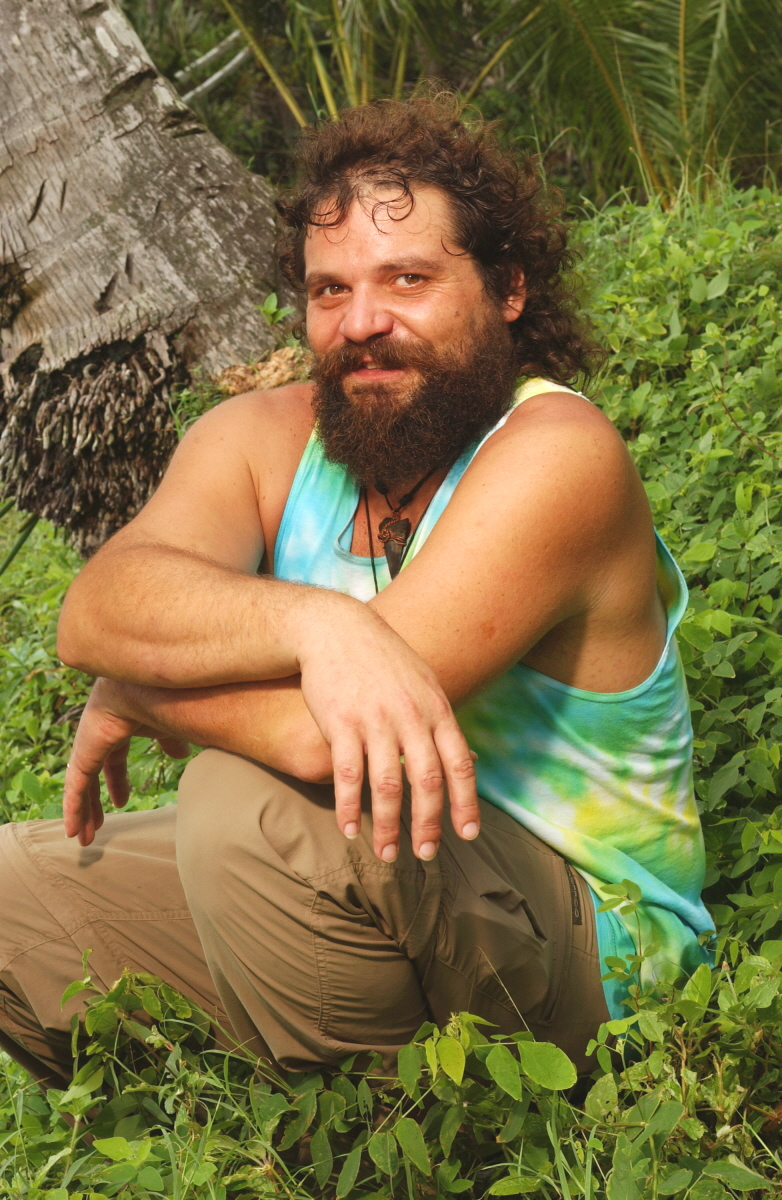
Rupert Boneham, The Amazing Race 31: Reality Showdown

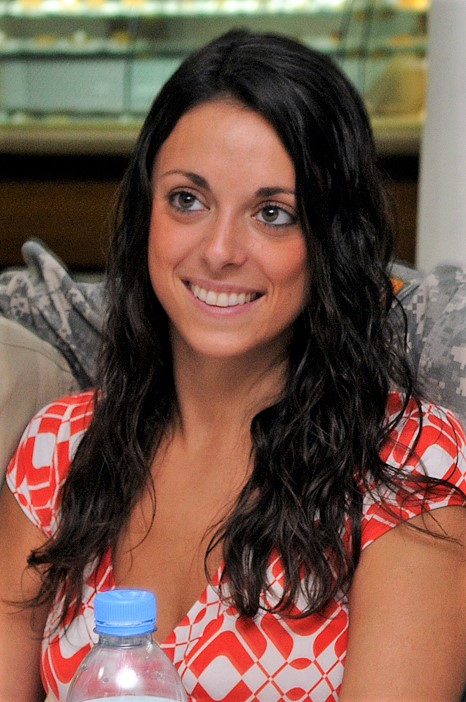
Eliza Orlins, The Amazing Race 31: Reality Showdown

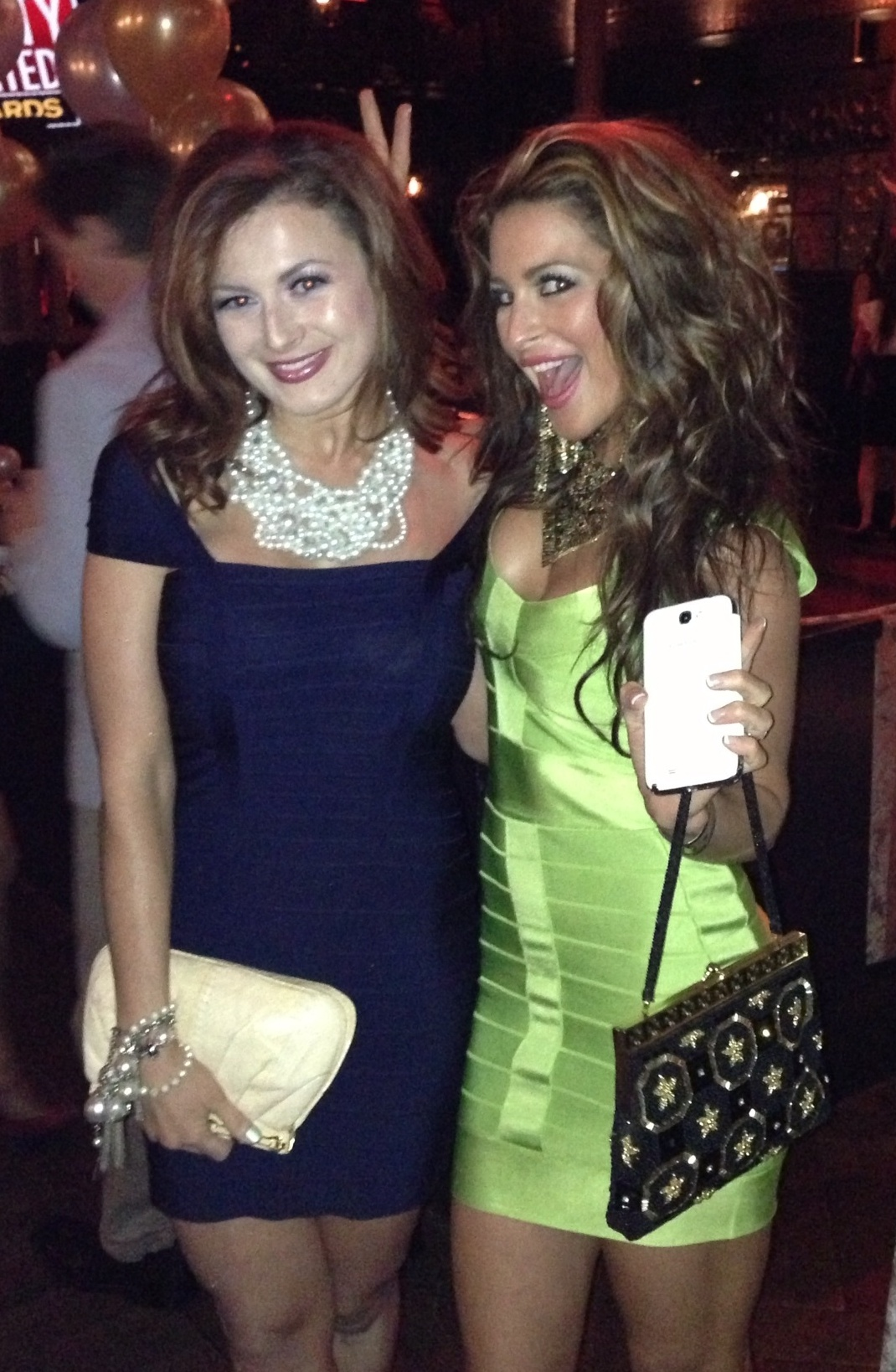
Rachel Reilly and Elissa Slater, The Amazing Race 31: Reality Showdown

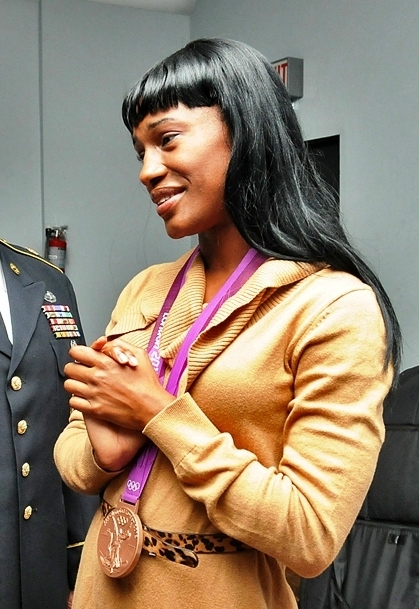
Kellie Wells-Brinkley, The Amazing Race 32

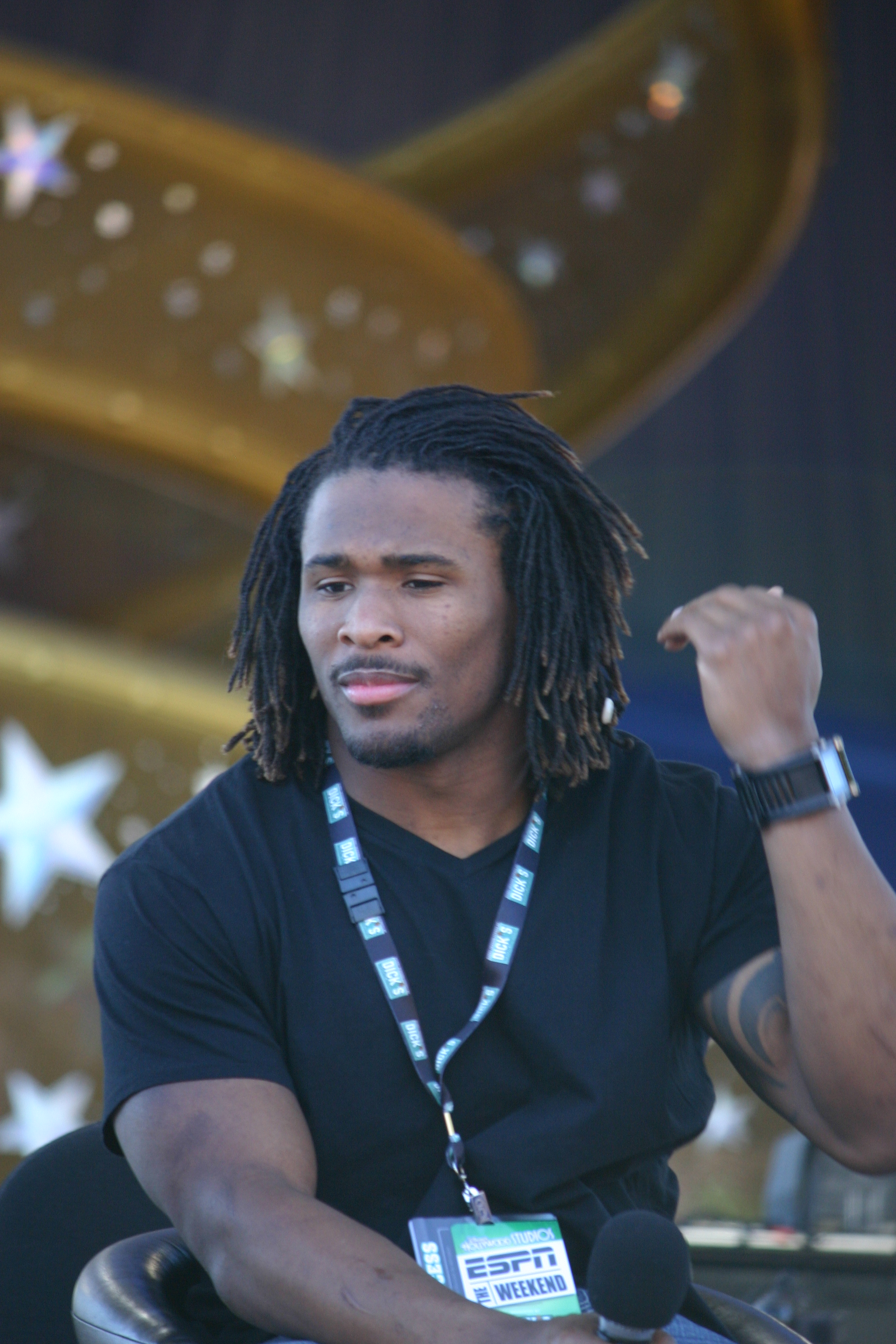
DeAngelo Williams, The Amazing Race 32

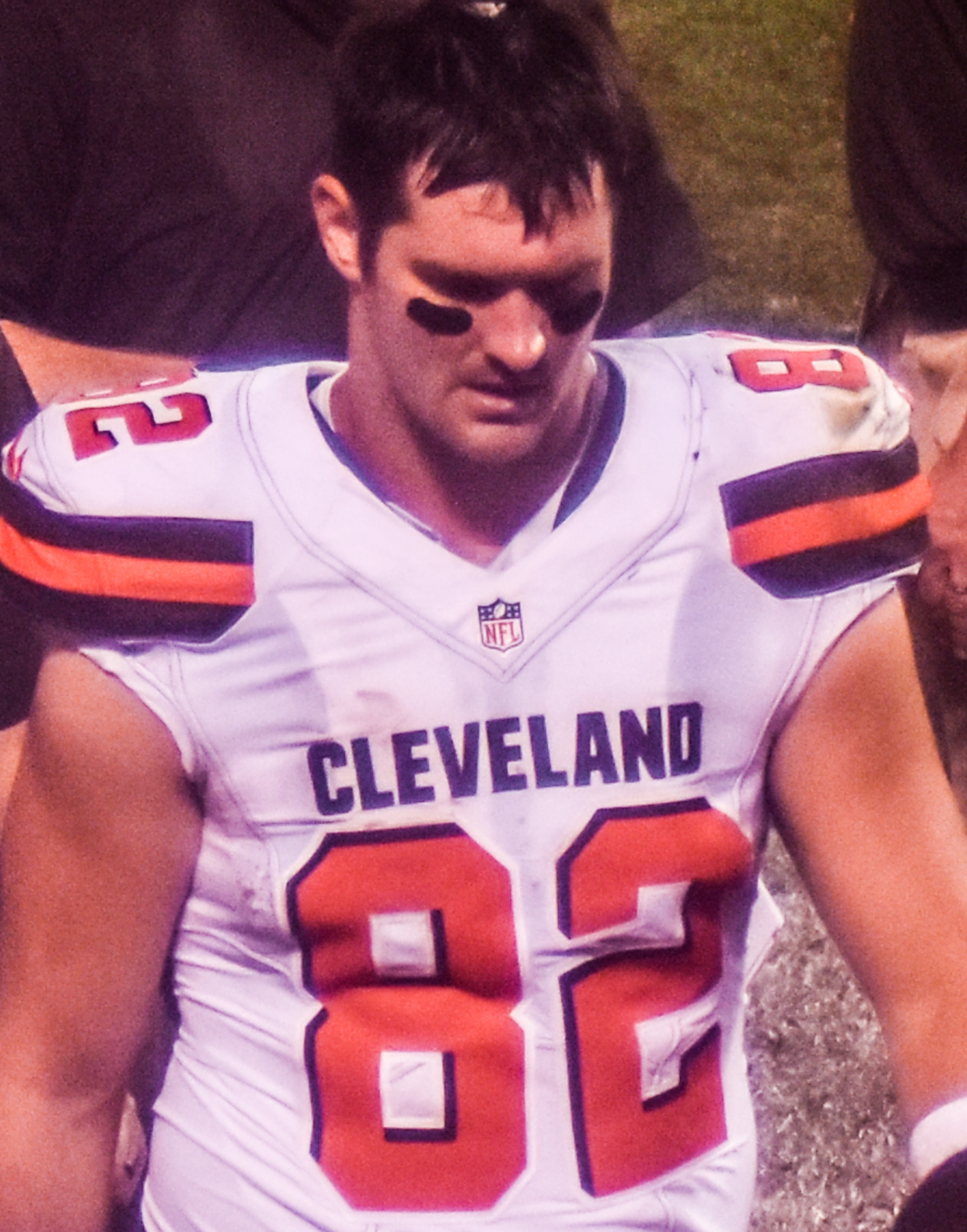
Gary Barnidge, The Amazing Race 32

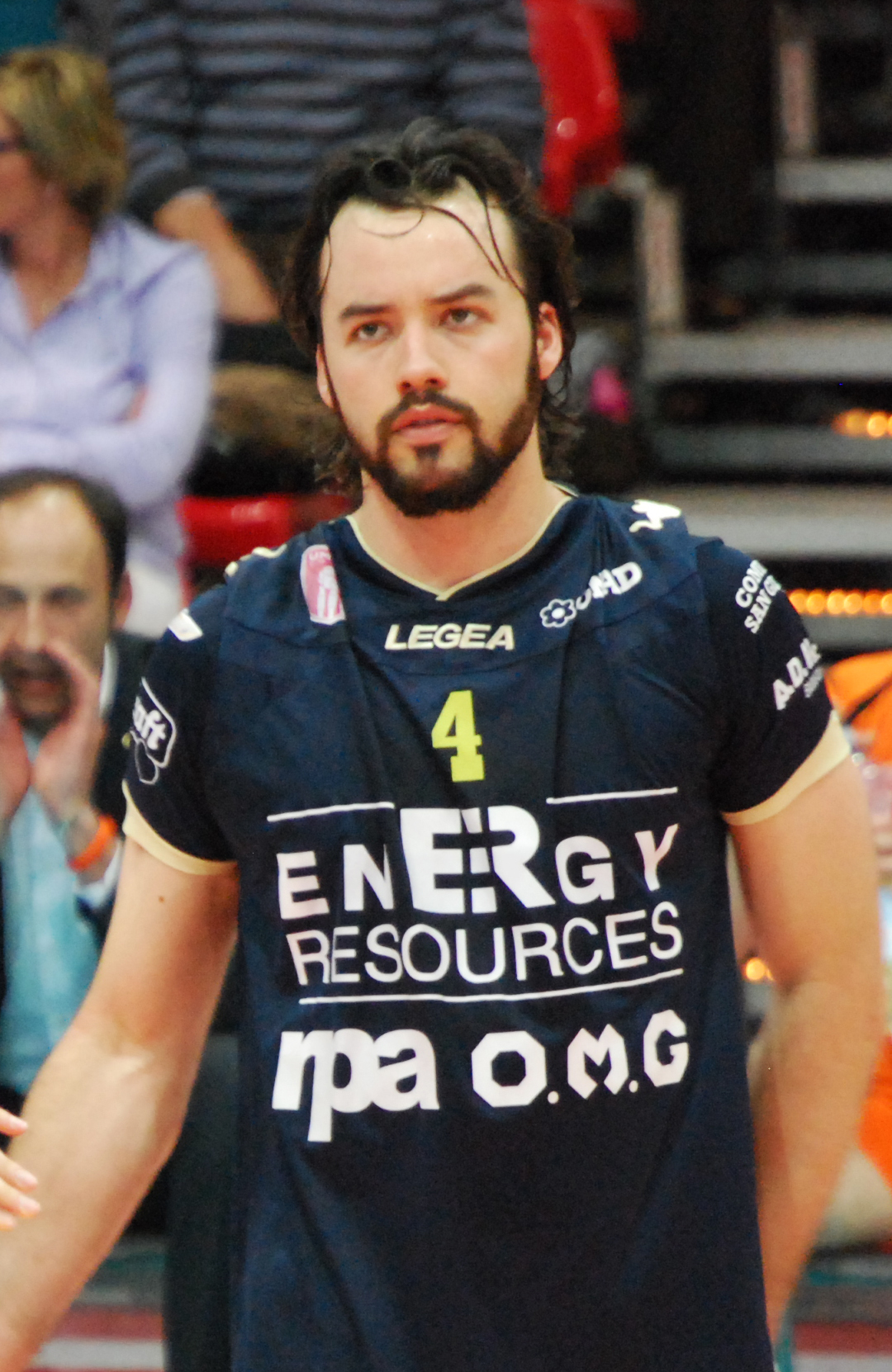
Riley McKibbin, The Amazing Race 32

This information was accurate at the time of filming.

Name	Age	Hometown	Season	Finish
Kevin Ng	31	San Diego, California	Season 29	11th
Jenn Lee	25	Palos Verdes, California	Season 29	11th
Jessie Shields	28	Howland, Ohio	Season 29	10th
Francesca Piccoli	33	Banning, California	Season 29	10th
Seth Tyler	37	Seattle, Washington	Season 29	9th
Olive Beauregard	24	Providence, Rhode Island	Season 29	9th
Shamir Arzeno	28	The Bronx, New York	Season 29	8th
Sara Fowler	27	Baltimore, Maryland	Season 29	8th
Vanck Zhu	28	Saint Paul, Minnesota	Season 29	7th
Ashton Theiss	25	Fort Worth, Texas	Season 29	7th
Liz Espey	24	Maryville, Missouri	Season 29	6th
Michael Rado	37	Pittsburgh, Pennsylvania	Season 29	6th
Becca Droz	26	Pittsburgh, Pennsylvania	Season 29	5th
Floyd Pierce	21	Highlands Ranch, Colorado	Season 29	5th
Matt Ladley	25	Steamboat Springs, Colorado	Season 29	4th
Redmond Ramos	28	Fremont, California	Season 29	4th
London Kaye	27	New York, New York	Season 29	3rd
Logan Bauer	27	Navarre, Florida	Season 29	3rd
Tara Carr	38	Alexandria, Virginia	Season 29	2nd
Joey Covino	46	Boston, Massachusetts	Season 29	2nd
Brooke Camhi	36	Lynbrook, New York	Season 29	1st
Scott Flanary	34	Charlotte, North Carolina	Season 29	1st
Dessie Mitcheson	27	Apollo, Pennsylvania	Season 30	11th
Kayla Fitzgerald	26	Clermont, Florida	Season 30	11th
April Gould	39	Gilbert, Arizona	Season 30	10th
Sarah Williams	39	Mesa, Arizona	Season 30	10th
Cedric Ceballos	48	Maui, Hawaii	Season 30	9th
Shawn Marion	39	Chicago, Illinois	Season 30	9th
Joey Chestnut	33	San Jose, California	Season 30	8th
Tim Janus	41	New York, New York	Season 30	8th
Trevor Wadleigh	31	New York, New York	Season 30	7th
Chris Marchant	33	New York, New York	Season 30	7th
Eric Guiffreda	33	Ponchatoula, Louisiana	Season 30	6th
Daniel Guiffreda	33	Ponchatoula, Louisiana	Season 30	6th
Lucas Bocanegra	35	Miami Springs, Florida	Season 30	5th
Brittany Austin	31	Miami Springs, Florida	Season 30	5th
Alexander Rossi	26	Nevada City, California	Season 30	4th
Conor Daly	25	Noblesville, Indiana	Season 30	4th
Kristi Leskinen	36	Scottsdale, Arizona	Season 30	3rd
Jen Hudak	30	Park City, Utah	Season 30	3rd
Henry Zhang	22	Los Angeles, California	Season 30	2nd
Evan Lynyak	22	Los Angeles, California	Season 30	2nd
Cody Nickson	32	Plano, Texas	Season 30	1st
Jessica Graf	26	Los Angeles, California	Season 30	1st
Art Velez	49	Temecula, California	Season 31 (Reality Showdown)	11th
J.J. Carrell	49	San Marcos, California	Season 31 (Reality Showdown)	11th
Rupert Boneham	54	Indianapolis, Indiana	Season 31 (Reality Showdown)	10th
Laura Boneham	49	Indianapolis, Indiana	Season 31 (Reality Showdown)	10th
Corinne Kaplan	39	Denver, Colorado	Season 31 (Reality Showdown)	9th
Eliza Orlins	35	New York, New York	Season 31 (Reality Showdown)	9th
Janelle Pierzina	38	Lakeville, Minnesota	Season 31 (Reality Showdown)	8th
Britney Haynes	30	Tulsa, Oklahoma	Season 31 (Reality Showdown)	8th
Rachel Reilly	33	Van Nuys, California	Season 31 (Reality Showdown)	7th
Elissa Slater	32	Las Vegas, Nevada	Season 31 (Reality Showdown)	7th
Chris Hammons	40	Moore, Oklahoma	Season 31 (Reality Showdown)	6th
Bret LaBelle	44	Dedham, Massachusetts	Season 31 (Reality Showdown)	6th
Becca Droz	28	Boulder, Colorado	Season 31 (Reality Showdown)	5th
Floyd Pierce	23	Highlands Ranch, Colorado	Season 31 (Reality Showdown)	5th
Nicole Franzel	25	Ubly, Michigan	Season 31 (Reality Showdown)	4th
Victor Arroyo	27	Slidell, Louisiana	Season 31 (Reality Showdown)	4th
Leo Temory	31	Pasadena, California	Season 31 (Reality Showdown)	3rd
Jamal Zadran	31	Houston, Texas	Season 31 (Reality Showdown)	3rd
Tyler Oakley	29	Jackson, Michigan	Season 31 (Reality Showdown)	2nd
Korey Kuhl	33	Jackson, Michigan	Season 31 (Reality Showdown)	2nd
Colin Guinn	38	Austin, Texas	Season 31 (Reality Showdown)	1st
Christie Lee Woods	40	Austin, Texas	Season 31 (Reality Showdown)	1st
Nathan Worthington	39	Dayton, Tennessee	Season 32	11th
Cody Buell	33	Paint Lick, Kentucky	Season 32	11th
Kellie Wells-Brinkley	38	Richmond, Virginia	Season 32	10th
LaVonne Idlette	34	Hampton, Virginia	Season 32	10th
Jerry Eaves	61	Louisville, Kentucky	Season 32	9th
Frank Eaves	25	Louisville, Kentucky	Season 32	9th
Michelle Newland	34	Lafayette, Louisiana	Season 32	8th
Victoria Newland	33	Lafayette, Louisiana	Season 32	8th
Leo Brown	31	Somerville, Massachusetts	Season 32	7th
Alana Folsom	29	Somerville, Massachusetts	Season 32	7th
Kaylynn Williams	30	Bluffton, South Carolina	Season 32	6th
Haley Williams	31	Bluffton, South Carolina	Season 32	6th
Eswar Dhinakaran	24	Fremont, California	Season 32	5th
Aparna Dhinakaran	26	Berkeley, California	Season 32	5th
DeAngelo Williams	37	Charlotte, North Carolina	Season 32	4th
Gary Barnidge	34	Middleburg, Florida	Season 32	4th
Riley McKibbin	31	Honolulu, Hawaii	Season 32	3rd
Maddison McKibbin	29	Honolulu, Hawaii	Season 32	3rd
Hung Nguyen	39	Houston, Texas	Season 32	2nd
Chee Lee	38	Houston, Texas	Season 32	2nd
Will Jardell	30	Nederland, Texas	Season 32	1st
James Wallington	31	Grand Rapids, Michigan	Season 32	1st

== Seasons 33–36 (2022–2024) ==
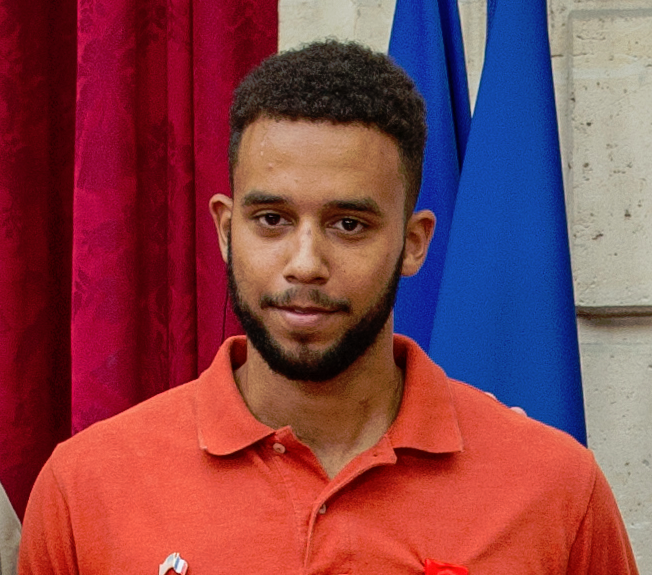
Anthony Sadler, The Amazing Race 33

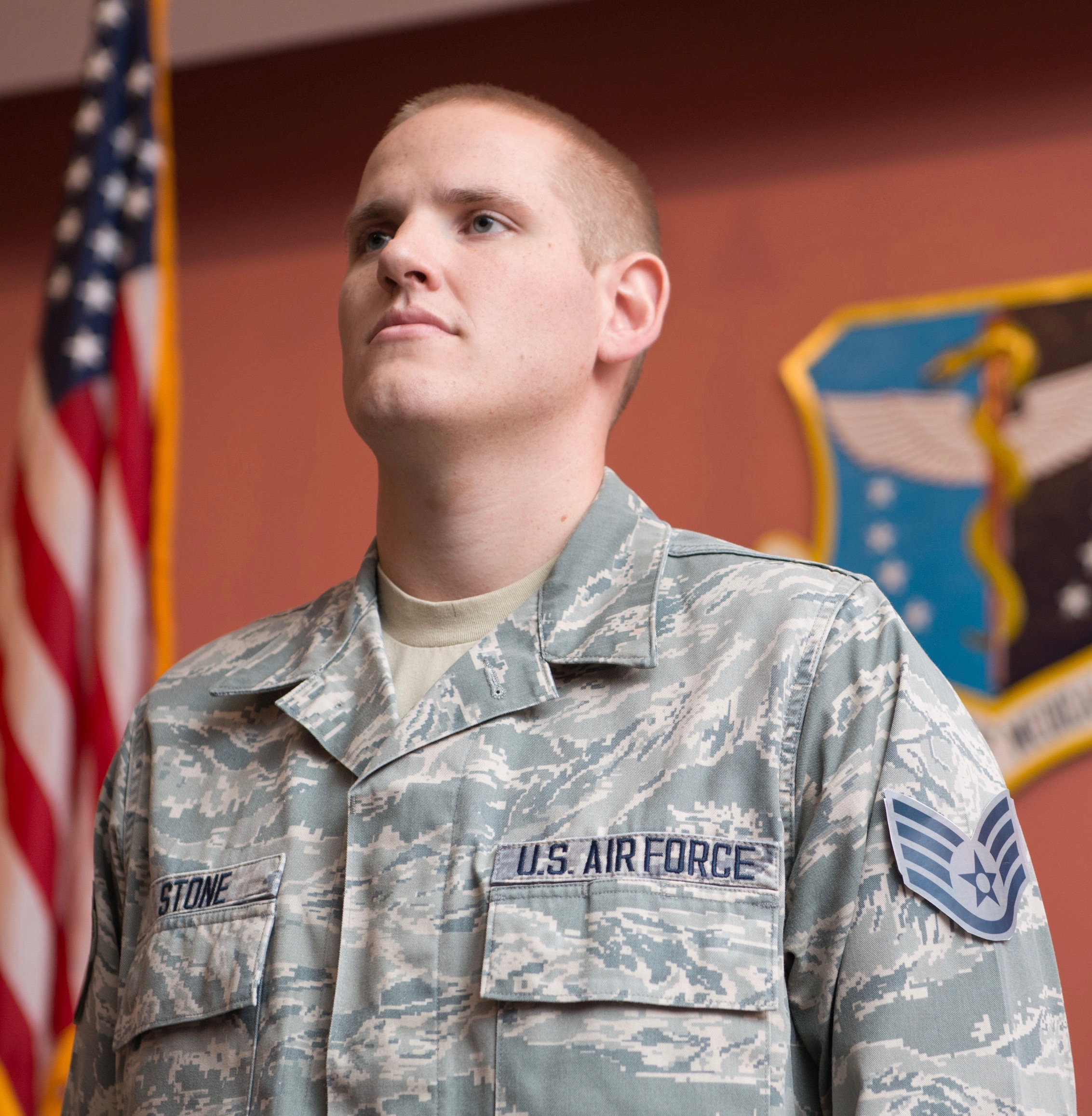
Spencer Stone, The Amazing Race 33

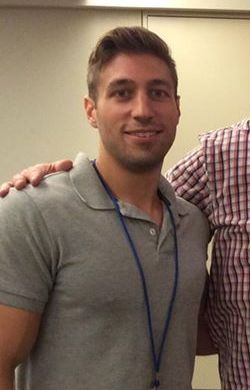
Ryan W. Ferguson, The Amazing Race 33

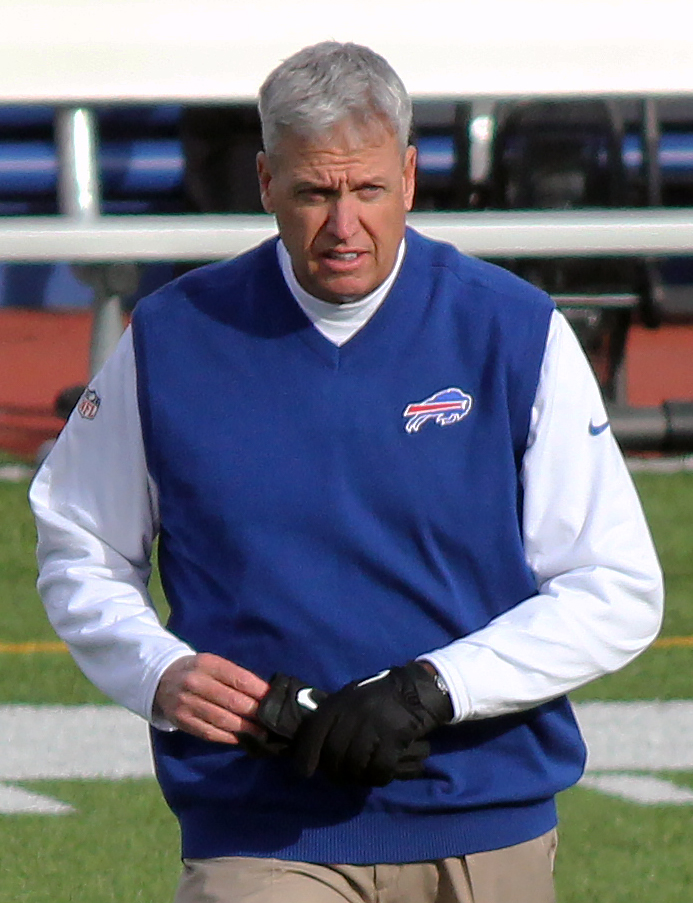
Rex Ryan, The Amazing Race 34

Marcus Craig, The Amazing Race 34

Michael Craig, The Amazing Race 34

This information was accurate at the time of filming.

Name	Age	Hometown	Season	Finish
Taylor Green-Jones	38	Fort Worth, Texas	Season 33	8th
Isaiah Green-Jones	31	Portland, Oregon	Season 33	8th
Caro Viehweg	23	Los Angeles, California	Season 33	8th
Ray Gantt	25	Lakewood, New Jersey	Season 33	8th
Connie Greiner	38	Newport News, Virginia	Season 33	8th
Sam Greiner	39	Charlotte, North Carolina	Season 33	8th
Anthony Sadler	29	Sacramento, California	Season 33	8th
Spencer Stone	29	Sacramento, California	Season 33	8th
Michael Norwood	36	Buffalo, New York	Season 33	7th
Moe Badger	42	Buffalo, New York	Season 33	7th
Akbar Cook Sr.	45	Newark, New Jersey	Season 33	6th
Sheri Cook	44	Havana, Florida	Season 33	6th
Marianela "Lulu" Gonzalez	37	North Bergen, New Jersey	Season 33	5th
Marissa "Lala" Gonzalez	37	North Bergen, New Jersey	Season 33	5th
Arun Kumar	56	Detroit, Michigan	Season 33	4th
Natalia Kumar	28	Detroit, Michigan	Season 33	4th
Ryan Ferguson	37	Manhattan, New York	Season 33	3rd
Dusty Harris	38	Columbia, Missouri	Season 33	3rd
Raquel Moore	31	Chicago, Illinois	Season 33	2nd
Cayla Platt	30	Gulf Breeze, Florida	Season 33	2nd
Kim Holderness	45	Sarasota, Florida	Season 33	1st
Penn Holderness	47	Durham, North Carolina	Season 33	1st
Aastha Lal	33	Marina Del Rey, California	Season 34	12th
Nina Duong	34	Marina Del Rey, California	Season 34	12th
Tim Mann	40	Brentwood, Tennessee	Season 34	11th
Rex Ryan	59	Brentwood, Tennessee	Season 34	11th
Rich Kuo	32	Huntington Beach, California	Season 34	10th
Dom Jones	35	Huntington Beach, California	Season 34	10th
Linton Atkinson	50	Brooklyn, New York	Season 34	9th
Sharik Atkinson	23	Brooklyn, New York	Season 34	9th
Abby Garrett	24	Birmingham, Alabama	Season 34	8th
Will Freeman	25	Birmingham, Alabama	Season 34	8th
Glenda Roberts	41	Norcross, Georgia	Season 34	7th
Lumumba Roberts	41	Norcross, Georgia	Season 34	7th
Quinton Peron	29	Pasadena, California	Season 34	6th
Mattie Lynch	27	Vista, California	Season 34	6th
Marcus Craig	38	Richmond Hill, Georgia	Season 34	5th
Michael Craig	30	Alamogordo, New Mexico	Season 34	5th
Aubrey Ares	29	Los Angeles, California	Season 34	4th
David Hernandez	29	Los Angeles, California	Season 34	4th
Luis Colon	34	Miami, Florida	Season 34	3rd
Michelle Burgos	34	Miami, Florida	Season 34	3rd
Emily Bushnell	36	Ardmore, Pennsylvania	Season 34	2nd
Molly Sinert	36	Palm Beach Gardens, Florida	Season 34	2nd
Derek Xiao	24	Los Angeles, California	Season 34	1st
Claire Rehfuss	25	Los Angeles, California	Season 34	1st
Alexandra Lichtor	34	Chicago, Illinois	Season 35	13th
Sheridan Lichtor	29	Chicago, Illinois	Season 35	13th
Elizabeth Rivera	52	Tampa, Florida	Season 35	12th
Iliana Rivera	27	Tampa, Florida	Season 35	12th
Jocelyn Chao	49	Albuquerque, New Mexico	Season 35	11th
Victor Limary	49	Albuquerque, New Mexico	Season 35	11th
Joe Moskowitz	35	New York, New York	Season 35	10th
Ian Todd	40	New York, New York	Season 35	10th
Liam Hykel	23	Cheyenne, Wyoming	Season 35	9th
Yeremi Hykel	24	San Marcos, Texas	Season 35	9th
Andrea Simpson	44	Philadelphia, Pennsylvania	Season 35	8th
Malaina Hatcher	45	Philadelphia, Pennsylvania	Season 35	8th
Morgan Franklin	31	Brooklyn, New York	Season 35	7th
Lena Franklin	29	Los Angeles, California	Season 35	7th
Robbin Tomich	41	Kirkland, Washington	Season 35	6th
Chelsea Day	41	Shoreline, Washington	Season 35	6th
Ashlie Martin	38	Chino, California	Season 35	5th
Todd Martin	38	Chino, California	Season 35	5th
Steve Cargile	54	Petty, Texas	Season 35	4th
Anna Leigh Wilson	28	Royse City, Texas	Season 35	4th
Rob McArthur	48	Riverside, California	Season 35	3rd
Corey McArthur	25	New York, New York	Season 35	3rd
Joel Strasser	42	Kuna, Idaho	Season 35	2nd
Garrett Smith	43	Meridian, Idaho	Season 35	2nd
Greg Franklin	25	New York, New York	Season 35	1st
John Franklin	27	Mountain View, California	Season 35	1st
Maya Mody	20	Monmouth Junction, New Jersey	Season 36	13th
Rohan Mody	23	Monmouth Junction, New Jersey	Season 36	13th
Chris Foster	60	Waltham, Massachusetts	Season 36	12th
Mary Cardona-Foster	27	Waltham, Massachusetts	Season 36	12th
Anthony Smith	26	Clearwater, Florida	Season 36	11th
Bailey Smith	26	Clearwater, Florida	Season 36	11th
Michelle Clark	39	East Point, Georgia	Season 36	10th
Sean Clark	46	East Point, Georgia	Season 36	10th
Kishori Turner	26	Gaithersburg, Maryland	Season 36	9th
Karishma Cordero	22	Austin, Texas	Season 36	9th
Derek Williams	57	Alta Loma, California	Season 36	8th
Shelisa Williams	55	Alta Loma, California	Season 36	8th
Sunny Pulver	41	Edgerton, Wisconsin	Season 36	7th
Bizzy Smith	37	Edgerton, Wisconsin	Season 36	7th
Angie Butler	55	Walla Walla, Washington	Season 36	6th
Danny Butler	27	San Diego, California	Season 36	6th
Yvonne Chavez	40	San Diego, California	Season 36	5th
Melissa Main	38	San Diego, California	Season 36	5th
Amber Craven	30	Englewood, Colorado	Season 36	4th
Vinny Cagungun	37	Englewood, Colorado	Season 36	4th
Rod Gardner	46	Lawrenceville, Georgia	Season 36	3rd
Leticia Gardner	38	Lawrenceville, Georgia	Season 36	3rd
Juan Villa	29	Spokane, Washington	Season 36	2nd
Shane Bilek	29	Marine City, Michigan	Season 36	2nd
Ricky Rotandi	34	New York, New York	Season 36	1st
Cesar Aldrete	34	New York, New York	Season 36	1st

== Seasons 37–39 (2025–2026) ==
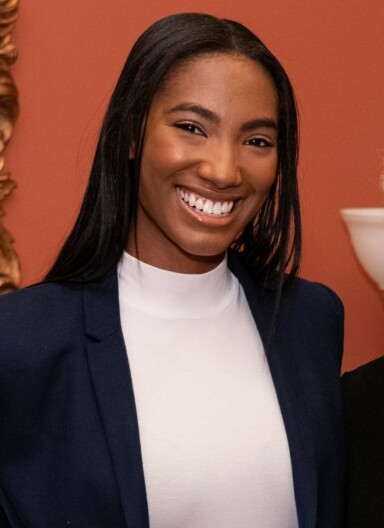
Taylor Hale, The Amazing Race 38: European Adventure

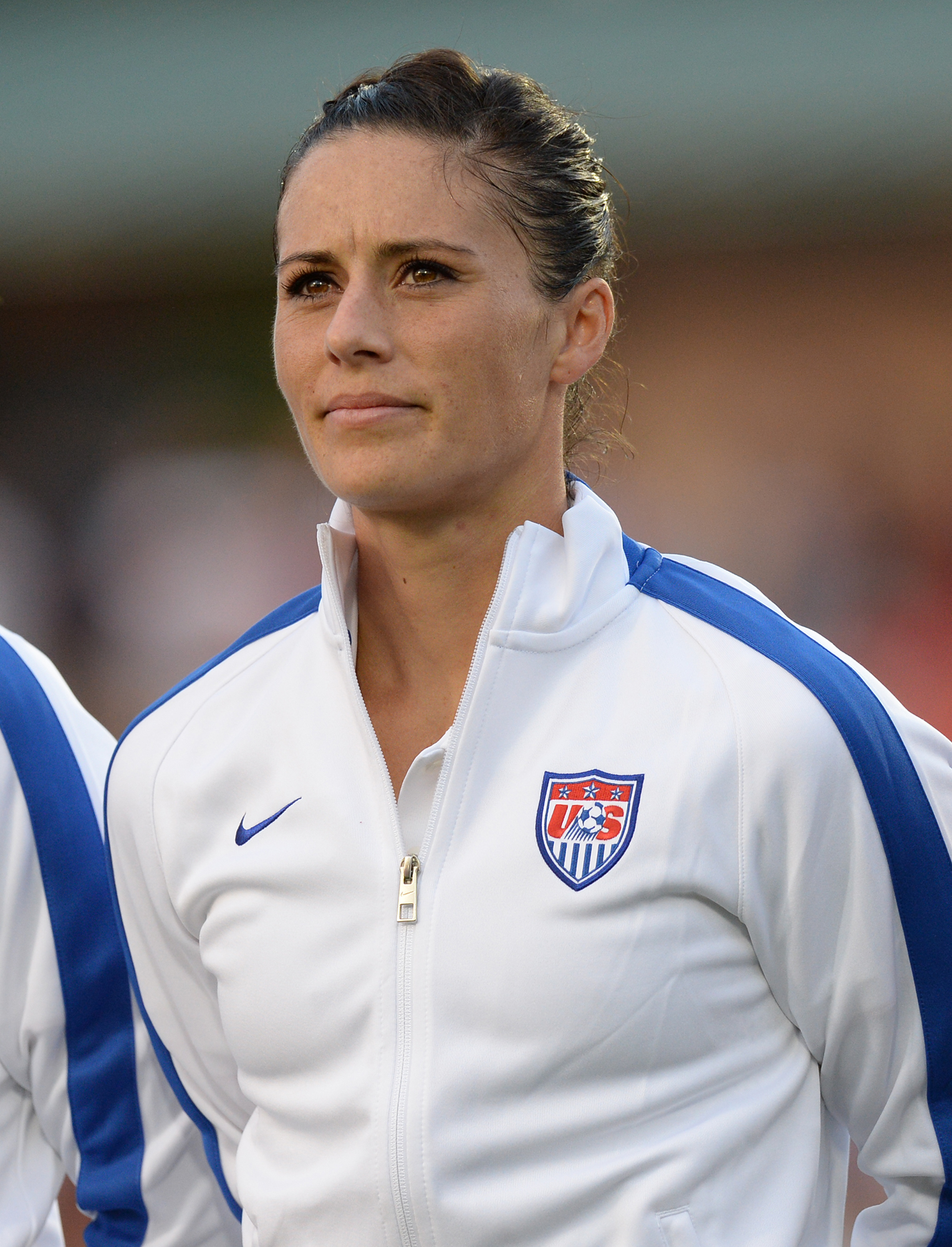
Ali Krieger, The Amazing Race 39

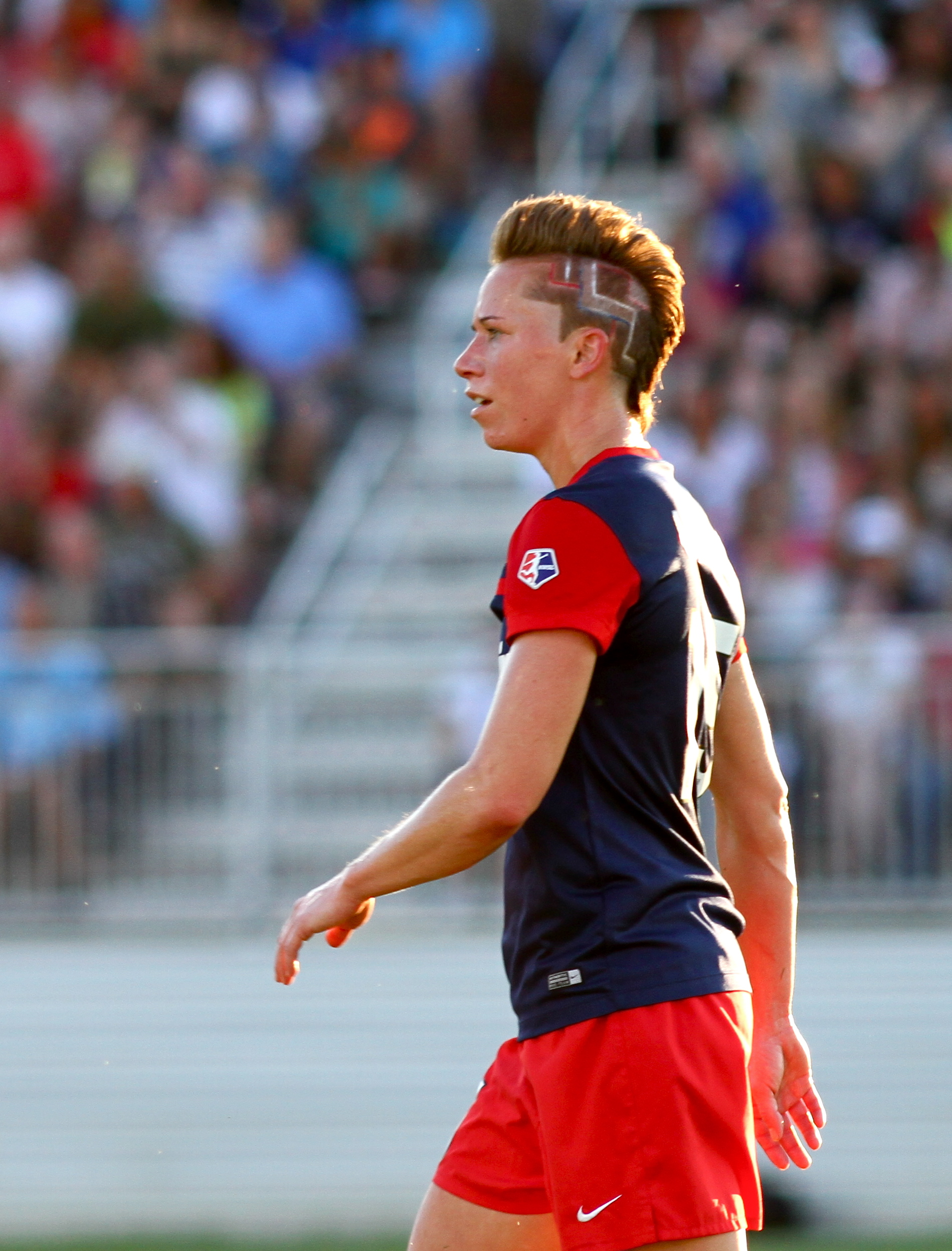
Joanna Lohman, The Amazing Race 39

Riley Tejcek, The Amazing Race 39

This information was accurate at the time of filming.

Name	Age	Hometown	Season	Finish
Jackye Clayton	51	Waco, Texas	Season 37	14th
Lauren McKinney	61	Waco, Texas	Season 37	14th
Mark Crawford	63	Watertown, Tennessee	Season 37	13th
Larry Graham	59	Bartlett, Tennessee	Season 37	13th
Ernest Cato	59	Chicago, Illinois	Season 37	12th
Bridget Cato	28	Somerville, Massachusetts	Season 37	12th
Courtney Ramsey	33	Leland, North Carolina	Season 37	11th
Jasmin Carey	34	Leland, North Carolina	Season 37	11th
Bernie Gutierrez	31	Dallas, Texas	Season 37	10th
Carrigain Scadden	33	Denver, Colorado	Season 37	10th
Scott Thompson	47	Salt Lake City, Utah	Season 37	9th
Lori Thompson	49	Salt Lake City, Utah	Season 37	9th
Jeff "Pops" Bailey	65	St. Louis, Missouri	Season 37	8th
Jeff Bailey	36	St. Louis, Missouri	Season 37	8th
Nick Fiorito	32	Brooklyn, New York	Season 37	7th
Mike Fiorito	28	Brooklyn, New York	Season 37	7th
Melinda Papadeas	66	Chandler, Arizona	Season 37	6th
Erika Papadeas	32	Englewood, Colorado	Season 37	6th
Brett Hamby	36	Las Vegas, Nevada	Season 37	5th
Mark Romain	37	Las Vegas, Nevada	Season 37	5th
Alyssa Borden	31	Philadelphia, Pennsylvania	Season 37	4th
Josiah Borden	32	Philadelphia, Pennsylvania	Season 37	4th
Jonathan Towns	42	Pomona, California	Season 37	3rd
Ana Towns	35	Pomona, California	Season 37	3rd
Han Nguyen	26	Los Gatos, California	Season 37	2nd
Holden Nguyen	22	Los Gatos, California	Season 37	2nd
Carson McCalley	28	Brooklyn, New York	Season 37	1st
Jack Dodge	27	Brooklyn, New York	Season 37	1st
Giacomo "Jack" Palumbo	40	Marlton, New Jersey	Season 38 (European Adventure)	13th
Vincenzo "Enzo" Palumbo	47	Bayonne, New Jersey	Season 38 (European Adventure)	13th
Angela Murray	51	Syracuse, Utah	Season 38 (European Adventure)	12th
Lexi Murray	23	Las Vegas, Nevada	Season 38 (European Adventure)	12th
Megan Belmonte	24	Providence, Rhode Island	Season 38 (European Adventure)	11th
Matt Turner	25	Providence, Rhode Island	Season 38 (European Adventure)	11th
Kathryn "Kat" Dunn	35	Dallas, Texas	Season 38 (European Adventure)	10th
Alex Romo	32	Dallas, Texas	Season 38 (European Adventure)	10th
Hannah Chaddha	25	Washington, D.C.	Season 38 (European Adventure)	9th
Simone Chaddha	22	Los Angeles, California	Season 38 (European Adventure)	9th
Kristine Bernabe	38	Los Angeles, California	Season 38 (European Adventure)	8th
Rubina Bernabe	36	Los Angeles, California	Season 38 (European Adventure)	8th
Natalie Negrotti	34	New York City, New York	Season 38 (European Adventure)	7th
Stephanie Negrotti	36	Kauaʻi, Hawaii	Season 38 (European Adventure)	7th
Tucker Des Lauriers	31	Brooklyn, New York	Season 38 (European Adventure)	6th
Eric Des Lauriers	32	Boston, Massachusetts	Season 38 (European Adventure)	6th
Jack Baham	58	Rancho Cucamonga, California	Season 38 (European Adventure)	5th
Chelsie Baham	28	Rancho Cucamonga, California	Season 38 (European Adventure)	5th
Isabel "Izzy" Gleicher	34	New York City, New York	Season 38 (European Adventure)	4th
Paige Seber	32	New York City, New York	Season 38 (European Adventure)	4th
Joseph Abdin	28	Palm Beach, Florida	Season 38 (European Adventure)	3rd
Adam Abdin	24	Miami, Florida	Season 38 (European Adventure)	3rd
Kyland Young	34	Los Angeles, California	Season 38 (European Adventure)	2nd
Taylor Hale	30	Los Angeles, California	Season 38 (European Adventure)	2nd
Jasmair "Jas" Bains	28	Omak, Washington	Season 38 (European Adventure)	1st
Jagateshwar "Jag" Bains	27	Omak, Washington	Season 38 (European Adventure)	1st
Zach Johnson	30	Dallas, Texas	Season 39	13th
Nate Johnson	27	Dallas, Texas	Season 39	13th
Katie Schultz	26	Murray, Kentucky	Season 39	12th
Charlotte Schultz	20	Murray, Kentucky	Season 39	12th
Jody Rebhun	44	Branford, Connecticut	Season 39	11th
Jenn Naso	44	Larchmont, New York	Season 39	11th
Cody Langlois	35	Los Angeles, California	Season 39	10th
Jaime Tribo	33	Tinley Park, Illinois	Season 39	10th
Dafina Dunmore	52	Chicago, Illinois	Season 39	9th
Saran Dunmore	51	Chicago, Illinois	Season 39	9th
Doug Matter	73	San Diego, California	Season 39	8th
Dylan Matter	19	San Diego, California	Season 39	8th
Michelle Rozalski Patterson	31	Rutherford, New Jersey	Season 39	7th
Matt Patterson	36	Rutherford, New Jersey	Season 39	7th
Ann-Marie Tejcek	56	Carmel, Indiana	Season 39	6th
Riley Tejcek	29	San Diego, California	Season 39	6th
Ali Krieger	42	Montclair, New Jersey	Season 39	Participating
Joanna Lohman	44	Silver Spring, Maryland	Season 39	Participating
Anuar Tager	58	Houston, Texas	Season 39	Participating
Andrea Tager Ballesca	25	Houston, Texas	Season 39	Participating
Conner Wilson	27	Loomis, California	Season 39	Participating
Garrett McGuire	27	Rocklin, California	Season 39	Participating
Daisha Wilks	28	Flat Rock, Alabama	Season 39	Participating
Dalton Hamby	27	Jacksonville, Alabama	Season 39	Participating
Erin Taylor	28	Fort Lauderdale, Florida	Season 39	Participating
Javi Vintimilla	30	Fort Lauderdale, Florida	Season 39	Participating
