= Rebecca Cardon =

American actress (born 1975)

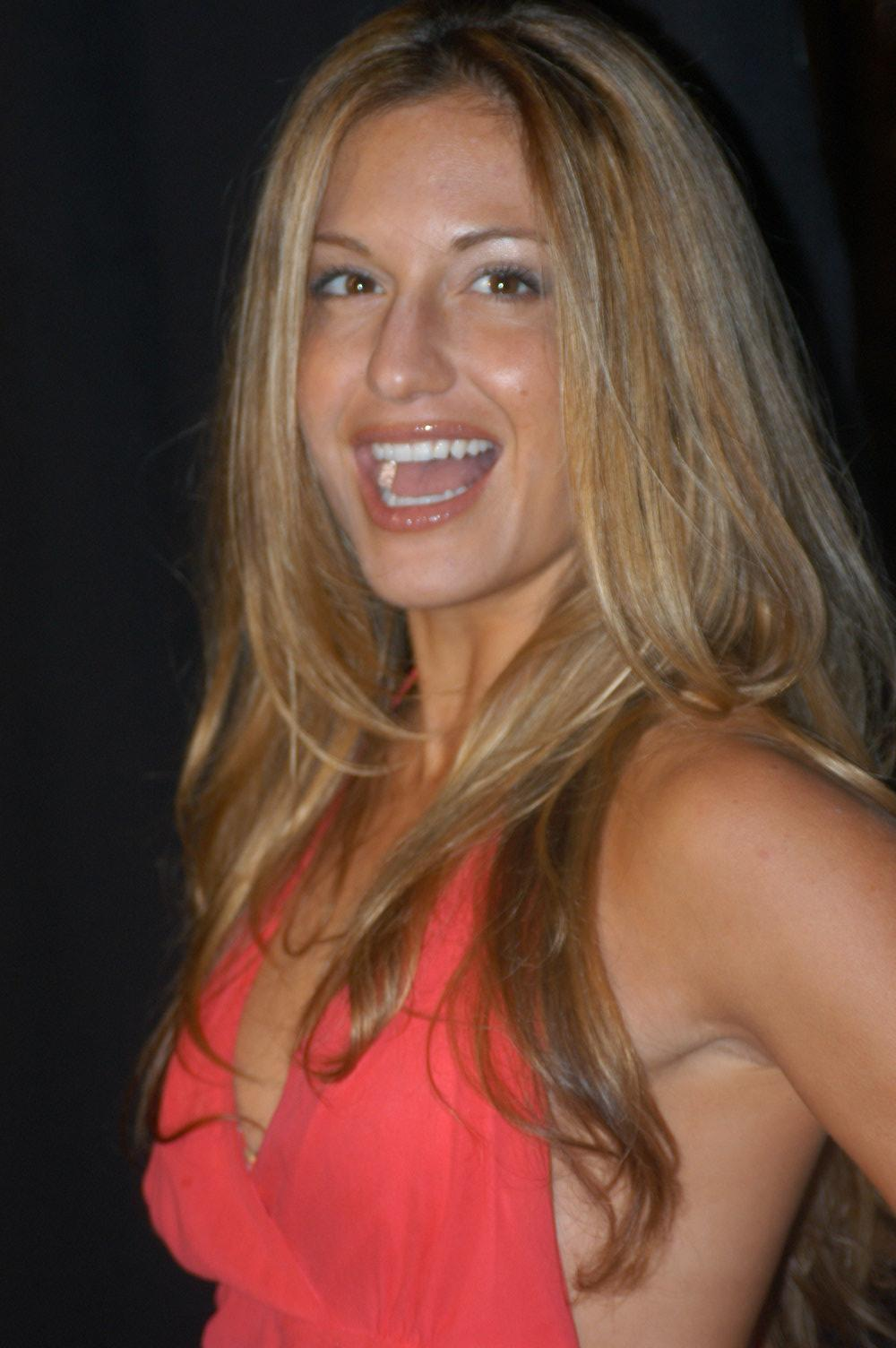
- Born: Rebecca Lynn Cardon; June 10, 1975 (age 51); Virginia Beach, Virginia, U.S.
- Education: George Mason University
- Occupations: Personal trainer Reality show participant Spokesperson
- Notable credit(s): Work Out (Bravo Network); Kill Reality (E!); The Amazing Race 6 (CBS)
- Website: Official website

Rebecca Lynn Cardon (born June 10, 1975) is a film and television actress, personal trainer, and product spokesperson.

Cardon appeared on several reality-TV shows — and in 2013 she self-published the book Breakups Blow! A Guided Workbook to Help You Break Free.

== Background and career ==
Cardon grew up in Virginia Beach, VA., began acting at age five in television commercials. and set a national bench press record at age 17 for her weight class of 105 pounds and age category of 17- to 19-year-olds when she lifted 135 pounds. After graduating from Norfolk Academy, she attended George Mason University, receiving a degree in broadcast journalism and a minor in theater.

Cardon received second billing for a role in Nice Pants, a 2001 twelve-minute short film directed by Michael Ansbach. In 2004-05 she was a contestant on the sixth season of the CBS television series The Amazing Race, finishing in 3rd place with her then boyfriend Adam Malis. TV Guide reported that Cardon and Mallis were favored to win, but that frequent arguments between the two "seemed to hold them back throughout the contest." Also in 2005 she appeared on one episode of the E! reality series Kill Reality, a series that followed filming of the film The Scorned, with its cast of former reality show participants.

From 2006 through 2008 Cardon appeared as herself in Bravo cable network's television series Work Out, receiving top billing for her 23 episodes. The series received GLAAD Media Awards nominations in 2007 and 2008. Her character was depicted as a trainer whose uninhibited flirtatiousness often got her into trouble when working at a gym/spa in Beverly Hills, California. In the 2007 season 2 she was depicted as having a relationship with Jackie Warner, a fellow-trainer and owner of the spa. In season 3 Cardon was depicted as petulant and jealous that Warner has moved on to another relationship. After Ellen reported that for the show's three seasons Cardon "has remained one of the show's most popular and essential cast members." In 2009, Cardon appeared on the Women Leaving Men for Other Women episode of The Oprah Winfrey Show, with Winfrey interviewing Cardon about her relationship with Warner.

Cardon portrayed Christie, a hitchhiker, in the 2009 feature film Desert Fox – which was nominated for Best Narrative Feature at the 2009 Los Angeles Reel Film Festival. In 2009, Cardon was interviewed on Sex Rehab with Dr. Drew, and in 2010 interviewed on the documentary series Reality Obsessed. In 2010, she was named Woman of the Week by a sports bra manufacturer.

== The Amazing Race ==
=== The Amazing Race 6 ===
In August 2004, Cardon competed on the sixth season of the CBS adventure reality show The Amazing Race with her ex-boyfriend at the time, Adam Malis. Despite both being Cardon and Malis physically strong, their constant arguing on the season, including over relatively mundane disagreements and inconveniences, lead them to struggle, yet the two reached the final leg of the race and finished in third place.

=== The Amazing Race 6 finishes ===
- An underlined blue placement with a double-dagger (‡) indicates that Adam and Rebecca were the last to arrive at a pit stop in a non-elimination leg.
- A green ƒ indicates that Adam and Rebecca won the Fast Forward.
- An italicized placement means it is Adam and Rebecca's placement at the midpoint of a double leg.
- A brown > indicates that Adam and Rebecca used a Yield and a brown < indicates that Adam and Rebecca were on the receiving end of a Yield.

Roadblocks performed by Cardon are bolded

Episode	Leg	Destination(s)	Detour choice (underlined)	Roadblock performance	Placement	Notes
1	1	United States → Iceland	Ice climb/Ice search	No roadblock	7th of 11	
2	2	Iceland → Norway	Endurance/Accuracy	Adam	6th of 10	
3	3	Norway → Sweden	Count it/Build it	Adam	5th of 9	
4	4	Sweden → Senegal	Stack 'em up/Pull 'em up	Adam	6th of 8	
5	5	Senegal → Germany	Beers/Brats	**Rebecca**	6th of 8	
6	6	Germany → Hungary	Catapault crash/Cannonball run	**Rebecca**	6th of 7	(Note: Leg 6 was a double-length leg, with two Detours and two Roadblocks, shown over two episodes. The placement listed in the top row reflect the order teams arrived at the leg's halfway point.)
8	6	Germany → Hungary	Swim/Paddle	**Rebecca**	5th of 7	(Note: Leg 6 was a double-length leg, with two Detours and two Roadblocks, shown over two episodes. The placement listed in the top row reflect the order teams arrived at the leg's halfway point.)
9	7	Hungary → France	Used fast forward		1st of 6ƒ	
10	8	France → Ethiopia	Raise the roof/Mud the hut	Adam	5th of 6>	
11	9	Ethiopia → Sri Lanka	Tree trunks/Elephant trunks	Adam	4th of 5	(Note: Adam & Rebecca initially arrived 2nd, but were not allowed to check in as they had not completed the additional task of swimming the length of the pool. As they swam the length of the pool, Hayden & Aaron and Freddy & Kendra checked in during this time, dropping Adam & Rebecca to 4th place.)
12	10	Sri Lanka → China	Bricks/Ice	**Rebecca**	4th of 4‡	
13	11	China	Spray/Scroll	**Rebecca**	3rd of 4	
13	12	China → United States	Outfits/Outrigger	Adam	3rd of 3	

== Filmography ==
- Nice Pants (2001) as Lisa
- The Amazing Race 6 (13 episodes, 2004–2005) (TV) as herself
- Kill Reality (1 episode, 2005) (TV) as herself
- The Scorned (2005) (TV) as The Amazing Nurse
- Work Out (23 episodes, 2006–2008) (TV) as herself
- Soup of the Day (2006) as Zoe
- Desert Fox (2009) as Christie
- The Oprah Winfrey Show (1 episode, 2009) (TV) as herself
- Sex Rehab with Dr. Drew (1 episode, 2009) (TV) as herself
- Reality Obsessed (1 episode, 2010) (TV) as herself
