= The Scorned =

- Movie poster
- Written by: Rob Cesternino; Eric Mittleman
- Directed by: Robert Kubilos
- Starring: Jenna Lewis; Steven Hill; Trish Schneider; Bob Guiney; Trishelle Cannatella
- Country of origin: United States
- Original language: English

Production
- Running time: 87 minutes

Original release
- Release: 2005

The Scorned is a 2005 horror television film. It was the first film cast entirely with the people from previous reality television series. It was filmed during the E! behind-the-scenes reality show Kill Reality.

The film is about a woman who awakes one night to find her fiance in bed with her best friend. The woman is murdered in the ensuing struggle. Seventeen months later her spirit still inhabits the house and unleashes her wrath on the unfaithful new tenants of the house.

The movie first premiered in a PG-13 version on October 31, 2005.

== Plot ==
Raina (Schneider) tells her best friend, Nichola, that she and her fiance Matt (Guiney) have been arguing. Nichola — who happens to be living in a room of the couple's beach house — assures her that it's merely "pre-wedding jitters," and voices a recurring line: "Your happily ever after is just around the corner."

The two return home, and it's not long before Matt and Raina run into yet another argument, resulting in Matt storming from the house in anger. Later that night, Raina awakens and begins to search the house for Matt. She is horrified to encounter him in bed with Nichola, and she storms from the room. The lovers slash her throat in the ensuing struggle. Mortally wounded, Raina stumbles into a pool of water, floating helplessly.

Seventeen months pass, and four friends decide to rent out the long-abandoned beach house together, completely unaware of its dark history. The four are couples, and are secretly cheating on each other. This, of course, enrages Raina's ghost, and she disposes of the "cheaters" through the creative means of a staircase (DQ (Fairplay)), pulling them into the earth (Angie (Morasca)), and even through an explosive lava lamp (Seth (Lehmkuhl) and Jennifer (Cooley)). While the survivors — including the leading couple, Kirsten (Lewis) and Oliver (Hill) — desperately try to figure out what's happening, they soon find themselves dealing with an eccentric named Murry (Zohn) who uses their property to "communicate with Raina's spirit." Murry reveals that Raina is, indeed, responsible for the deaths.

Soon, Kirsten and Oliver find themselves caught between two stories — one from Matt, and another from the slightly volatile Nichola. Through both stories, it can be surmised that, immediately following the accident, Matt told Nichola to flee to Mexico, promising to come rescue her once the entire problem was resolved. When the police arrived, however, Matt told them that Nichola had inflicted the wound on Raina, and that she had stolen quite a good deal of property. Thus, Nichola was stranded in Mexico and had taken the entire rap for the accident. Angry, she sneaks back over the border to seek revenge.

Meanwhile, Kirsten realizes that she has been acting quite strangely, and feels a strange connection to Raina. Murry explains that this is not demonic possession, as it may appear, but Raina is merely making Kirsten feel what she feels. This leads to several instances of Kirsten acting quite strangely. For example, when Nichola tries to explain to the couple her side of the story, an enraged Kirsten blows up on her, and the two scuffle. Also, she has a vision of killing her ex-boyfriend Oliver, as he long ago allegedly cheated on her. This connection is vital to the storyline, as it compels Kirsten and Oliver to solve this problem, not retreat from it.

Kirsten and Oliver learn that Raina did not actually die, but is in a coma in a nearby hospital. Soon only Matt, Kirsten, and Oliver remain in the mystery — as the other characters met certain doom (Matt kills Murray after he confronts him; and Nichola gets dragged by Raina's spirit into the pool) — and it is at this point that Raina wakes up. Disoriented, she staggers for the beach house for the final confrontation. In a heated finale, Matt attacks Kirsten, who is saved by Oliver, and Raina is finally able to confront Matt. She utters what became the movie's slogan: "All those cheaters...they all deserve to die!" She loses her will to live, and she tears open the skin that has grown over the slash on her neck. Matt falls to the floor soon after, landed on the fire poker that he originally wounded Raina with, and the two die with their fingers interlocked.

At the end of the movie, Kirsten and Oliver remain alive and well, and have made amends. Ready to escape this mystery, they depart from the hospital.

The movie ends with a plot twist: Nichola is not dead, but in a coma, which she wakes from as the credits roll.

== Cast ==
=== Major ===
- Kirsten - Jenna Lewis (Survivor: Borneo & Survivor: All-Stars)
- Oliver - Steven Hill (The Real World: Las Vegas)
- Raina - Trish Schneider (The Bachelor)
- Matt - Bob Guiney (The Bachelorette & The Bachelor)
- Nichola - Trishelle Cannatella (The Real World: Las Vegas)
- Seth - Reichen Lehmkuhl (The Amazing Race 4)
- Jennifer - Tonya Cooley (The Real World: Chicago)
- DQ - Jon Dalton - "Jonny Fairplay" (Survivor: Pearl Islands & Survivor: Micronesia)
- Trish - Stacie Jones Upchurch (The Apprentice 2)
- Murry - Ethan Zohn (Survivor: Africa, Survivor: All-Stars, & The Amazing Race 19)
- Sandra - Erika Landin (Big Brother 4 & Big Brother 7)
- Angie - Jenna Morasca (Survivor: The Amazon, Survivor: All-Stars, & The Amazing Race 19)
- Kozlowski - Toni Ferrari (Paradise Hotel & Love Cruise)

=== Supporting ===
- Gervase Peterson (Survivor: Borneo)
- Jonathan Baker (The Amazing Race 6)
- Victoria Fuller (The Amazing Race 6)
- Bolo Dar'Tainian (The Amazing Race 6)
- Diane Henry (Big Brother 5 & Big Brother 7)
- Rebecca Cardon (The Amazing Race 6)
- Tian Kitchen (The Amazing Race 4)
- Ivana Ma (The Apprentice 2)
- Nikki McKibbin (American Idol)
- Irulan Wilson (The Real World: Las Vegas)
- Lori Valenti (Big Brother 5)
- Pamela Day (The Apprentice 2)
- Scott Long (Big Brother 5)
- Burton Roberts (Survivor: Pearl Islands)
- Rob Cesternino (Survivor: The Amazon & Survivor: All-Stars)
