= Tonya Cooley =

American actress and television personality

- Born: January 7, 1980 (age 46); Visalia, California, U.S.
- Spouse: Adam Esch (m. 2005; div. 2009)
- Modeling information
- Height: 5 ft 4 in (163 cm)
- Hair color: Blonde
- Eye color: Blue

Tonya Cooley (born January 7, 1980, in Visalia, California) is an American actress and television personality. She is a former cast member on MTV's reality television series, The Real World: Chicago, the 11th season of The Real World, which aired in 2002. She was then a regular on the spin-off series, Real World/Road Rules Challenge, participating in eight challenges, with her last being in 2009. She also posed for Playboy as a Cyber Girl of the Week and appeared in an episode of the Cinemax adult series The Erotic Traveler. The stressful environment of the Real World/Road Rules Challenge seasons led to a bout with alcoholism, but in 2016, BuzzFeed News reported she has gained sobriety in the years since leaving the series and that she is now a salon owner. Cooley told the publication, "I am a genuinely happy person now."

== The Real World: Chicago ==
Tonya Cooley hails from Walla Walla, Washington. At the time she began filming The Real World: Chicago, she claims to have never interacted with African-Americans and gay people and had rarely been apart from her boyfriend, Justin. She did not socialize as much as her housemates, who often alienated her because they felt that she could be judgmental and overly dramatic at times. She was hospitalized three times during the season because of kidney stones, and even left to go home for about a week. She got into arguments with roommate Theo Gantt III, including one in which a glass was thrown, as well as with roommates Aneesa Ferreira and Cara Kahn. Her constant use of the phone when talking with Justin upset her housemates. Her breast implants were also a subject of much conversation as she would often talk about how she was flat broke yet had implants in her breasts worth thousands of dollars. (She claimed that they were a gift from a wealthy friend for her 21st birthday.)

== Real World/Road Rules Challenge ==
=== Battle of the Sexes ===
Though not most notable for her appearance on this season, Tonya competed and was the eighth girl to be voted off. Tonya is most remembered from this season for not going to Puck's wedding. Additionally, she refused to participate in a challenge that involved nudity (where nudity was instructed by others and not chosen by self choice), her actions in later years which included posing for Playboy and appearing in an episode of the Cinemax softcore series The Erotic Traveler show different intentions, where she was empowered by deciding for herself and not told how to present herself by men.

=== The Gauntlet ===
For the next Challenge, Cooley became friends with Coral Smith, and became playful with Challenge veteran Veronica Portillo. In the early stage of the game, she injured her leg during a challenge, and had to wear a leg-cast while waiting for a comprehensive assessment of her leg. This scared her Real World team, and they opted to vote her into the Gauntlet. Angry and upset, she proceeded to the Gauntlet and lost. This would be third time she would be sick or hurt in front of the MTV cameras. (In Battle of the Sexes, she also had to wear a leg cast, but it did not affect her position).

=== Battle of the Sexes 2 ===
In this Challenge, Cooley becomes more of a nuisance to the girls, more specifically onetime friends Coral, Veronica, and Rachel Robinson. However her determination and marked improvement on the challenge did not go unnoticed. She even went as far, in a challenge requiring the competing teams to procure a cell phone encased in a block of ice by melting it, to put rocks in her mouth to try to melt it. However, her inability to step up as a leader as well as her waning prowess also did not go unnoticed. Her notable argument with Road Ruler Tina Barta became a staple on the show. She was voted off toward the end of the Challenge.

=== The Inferno II ===
In this Challenge, tensions arose between her and Tina Barta. Fellow Bad Ass team member Beth Stolarczyk instigated an animosity on the part of Robin Hibbard toward Cooley by telling Hibbard that Cooley bragged about a relationship she had with Hibbard's boyfriend, Mark Long. Hibbard angrily excoriated Cooley, who denied Stolarczyk's allegations, to which Hibbard responded by calling her a whore and a liar. When Cooley confronted a sleeping Stolarczyk, she was coy and refused to answer. In a fit of pique, Cooley took Stolarczyk's luggage and valuables and threw them all in the pool. Stolarczyk left the show as a result and took legal action. Veronica Portillo, Rachel Robinson, and Tina Barta began to harass Tonya, who referred to the three as the "Mean Girls." She seeks relief from this harassment by speaking over the phone about her situation with friend Katie Doyle, a fellow Challenger not on the season. In the challenges, Tonya fluctuated from remarkable to disastrous. She won two Infernos, sending two girls home, and made it to the final challenge, but her team lost.

=== Fresh Meat ===
She was partnered with Johnnie. Their pair was fourth to be eliminated, but Tonya improved greatly on this challenge. Even though she and her partner did not win any of the challenges during Fresh Meat, they came close several times. She claimed on her appearance on MTV's True Life that Fresh Meat would be her last challenge.

=== The Inferno III ===
Despite claiming that Fresh Meat would be her last appearance on the Challenges, Tonya participated on the third Inferno as part of the Bad-Ass team. Before coming onto the show she was married. She developed an animosity between her and Susie Meister who offended Tonya claiming her perfume made her "smell like a stripper, but in a good way." She also developed a friendship with Jenn Grijalva. After six challenges along with Derrick Kosinski, Tonya finally wins her first challenge and $40,000.00

=== The Island ===
Tonya again participated in the next installment of the RW/RR challenge, but was the first eliminated by a vote of 14-3. During the challenge she admitted she wanted to go home because she didn't have cute clothes.

=== The Ruins ===
Cooley participates in the new challenge The Ruins in the Champions team. It premiered on September 30, 2009. She started off strong in the first episode, eliminating Diem Brown. In Episode 4, Cooley was disqualified from the show after assaulting Veronica Portillo.

== Non-reality TV appearances ==
Tonya starred in "Lost in Ecstasy", the second episode of the Cinemax series Erotic Traveler, which premiered February 9, 2007. She has also appeared as a celebrity interviewer in Girls Gone Wild commercials in 2007.

== Sexual assault allegations ==
In October 2011, Cooley filed charges that she was raped with a toothbrush by two of her fellow cast members from The Challenge Evan Starkman and Kenny Santucci while passed out during the production of The Ruins edition of the show. The Challenge production company Bunim/Murray Productions denied the allegations, saying that, “After a thorough investigation, we have found Tonya Cooley’s claims to be completely baseless.” In a legal filing, the defendants stated that Tonya's drunken, exhibitionist behavior was the reason she ended up in unspecified trouble, and that she "failed to avoid the injuries she claimed to have suffered." On October 24, 2012, the case was settled out of court. As of 2023, the details of the settlement have not been publicly revealed. Cooley, Santucci and Starkman were never invited back to compete on new seasons of The Challenge.

== Reality shows ==
- Real World/Road Rules Challenge: The Ruins (2009)
- Real World/Road Rules Challenge: The Island (2008)
- Real World/Road Rules Challenge: The Inferno III (2007)
- Sexiest Women 2007 (2007)
- Celebrity Paranormal Project Episode: The First Warden (2006)
- Real World/Road Rules Challenge: Fresh Meat (2006)
- Soup of the Day (2006)
- True Life Episode: I'm a Reality Star (2006)
- The Scorned (2005) Jennifer
- Kill Reality (2005)
- Real World/Road Rules Challenge: The Inferno II (2005)
- Real World/Road Rules Challenge: Battle of the Sexes 2 (2004)
- Real World/Road Rules Challenge: The Gauntlet (2003)
- Real World/Road Rules Challenge: Battle of the Sexes (2003)
- Stop Being Polite: The Real World Chicago Reunion (2002)
- The Real World You Never Saw: Chicago (2002)
- The Real World: Chicago (2002)
