= Gus McLeod =

American pilot and author (born 1954)

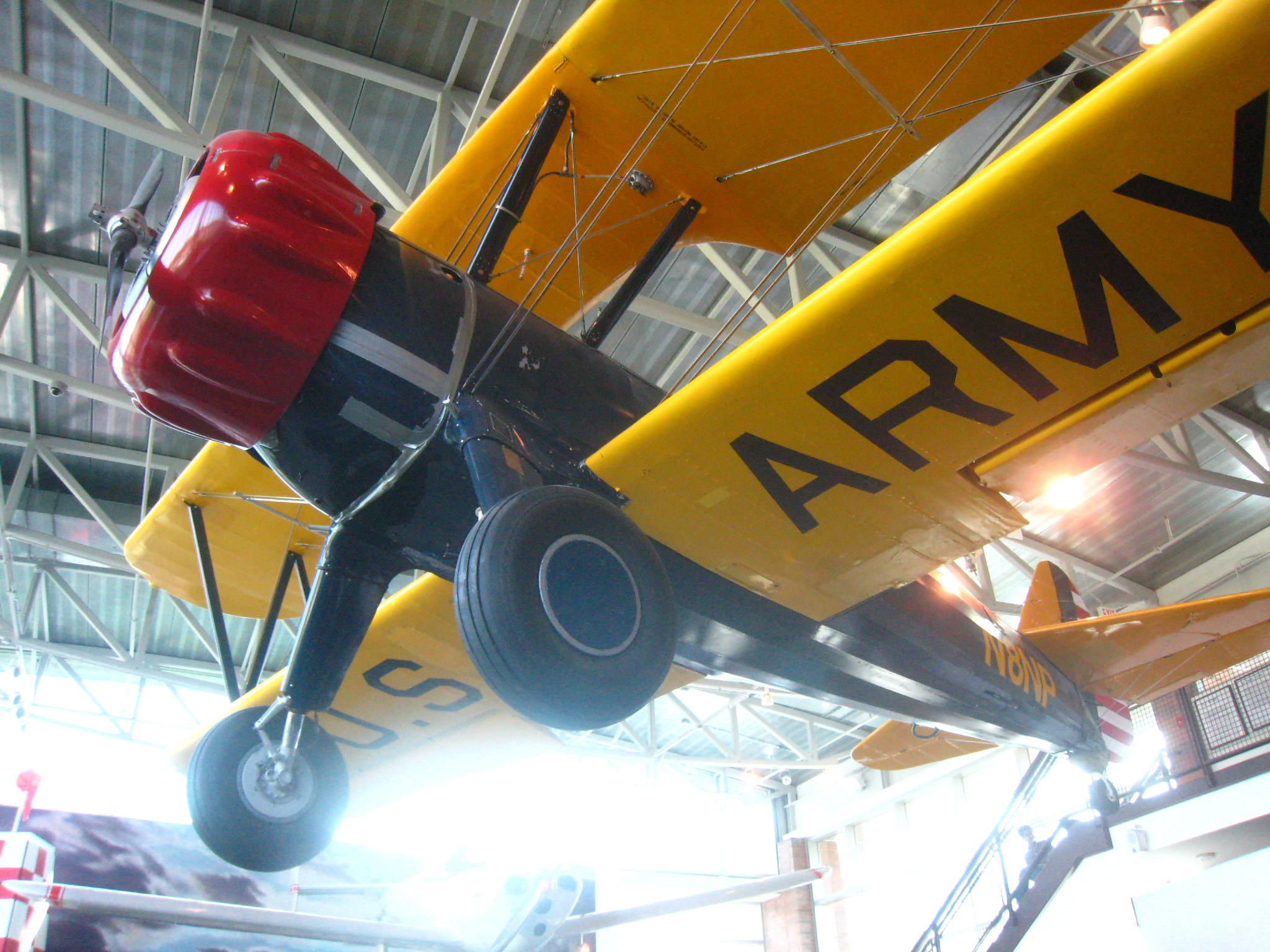
- McLeod's Stearman in the College Park Aviation Museum
- Born: September 9, 1954 (age 72)
- Education: B.A. Catholic University studied chemical engineering University of Maryland
- Occupations: Chemical engineer, former CIA agent
- Employer(s): Executive Director, Glenn L. Martin Maryland Aviation Museum, Middle River, Maryland, Proxy Aviation Systems, Inc.
- Known for: Subject of an award-winning National Geographic special, Arctic Flyer.
- Television: The Amazing Race 6
- Spouse: Mary
- Children: 3 including Hera

Gustavus A. McLeod (born September 9, 1954) is an American pilot and author whose exploits have been featured in reality television appearances. He was the first person to fly over the North Pole in an open-cockpit biplane.

== Biography ==
McLeod grew up in Corinth, Mississippi, the son of a Methodist minister. McLeod is a 1976 graduate of The Catholic University of America in Washington, D.C.

On April 17, 2000, McLeod became the first person to fly over the North Pole in an open-cockpit biplane.

McLeod is an entrepreneur who, in 2004, lived in Laytonsville, Maryland. However, he was also reported to live in Gaithersburg, Maryland that same year.

McLeod and his wife, Mary, have three children.

McLeod was featured in a four-column article in the Smithsonian in April 2003, because he planned to fly his "...Beech 18 solo from the South Pole to the North Pole, a 32,000 mile trip, in about two months".

The UK aeronautic company Cobham plc reports in an employee newsletter dated June 2005 that McLeod is a former CIA chemist, and is currently a businessman based in Maryland.

=== Works ===
- Solo to the Top of the World: Gus McLeod's Daring Record Flight, 2003, 245 pages ISBN 1-58834-102-X

=== Appearances ===
- Television — Inside Base Camp: Tori Murden and Gus McLeod, 2002
- Television — The Amazing Race 6, 2005

== The Amazing Race ==
=== The Amazing Race 6 ===
In August 2004, McLeod competed on the sixth season of the CBS adventure reality show The Amazing Race with his daughter Hera. They were eliminated at the end of the sixth leg, finishing in seventh place.

=== The Amazing Race 6 finishes ===
- An italicized placement means it is a Gus and Hera's placement at the midpoint of a double leg.
- A red placement with a dagger (†) indicates that Gus and Hera were eliminated.

Roadblocks performed by Gus are bolded

Episode	Leg	Destination(s)	Detour choice (underlined)	Roadblock performance	Placement	Notes
1	1	United States → Iceland	Ice climb/Ice search	No roadblock	10th of 11	
2	2	Iceland → Norway	Endurance/Accuracy	Hera	3rd of 10	
3	3	Norway → Sweden	Count it/Build it	**Gus**	3rd of 9	
4	4	Sweden → Senegal	Stack 'em up/Pull 'em up	**Gus**	7th of 8	
5	5	Senegal → Germany	Beers/Brats	Hera	5th of 8	
6	6	Germany → Hungary	Catapault crash/Cannonball run	Hera	2nd of 7	(Note: Leg 6 was a double-length leg, with two Detours and two Roadblocks, shown over two episodes. The placement listed in the top row reflect the order teams arrived at the leg's halfway point.)
8	6	Germany → Hungary	Swim/Paddle	**Gus**	7th of 7†	(Note: Leg 6 was a double-length leg, with two Detours and two Roadblocks, shown over two episodes. The placement listed in the top row reflect the order teams arrived at the leg's halfway point.)

== Bibliography ==
- Smithsonian magazine, April 2003, pg 42 Flight of Fancy
