= Victoria Fuller (model) =

American actress

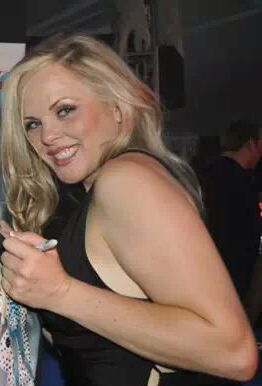

Playboy centerfold appearance
- January 1996
- Preceded by: Samantha Torres
- Succeeded by: Kona Carmack

Personal details
- Born: Victoria Alynette Fuller; December 11, 1970 (age 55) Santa Barbara, California
- Height: 5 ft 8 in (1.73 m)
- Official website

Victoria Alynette Fuller (born December 11, 1970, in Santa Barbara, California, United States) is an American glamour model, artist, actress and reality TV performer.

She is Playboy magazine's Playmate of the Month for January 1996 and has appeared in numerous Playboy Special Editions. Nine years after her Playmate appearance, she posed for Playboy again in the May 2005 issue.

Fuller appeared on the sixth season of the television show The Amazing Race with her then husband in 2004. Since then, she appeared on Battle of the Network Reality Stars, Kill Reality and a reality-star edition of Fear Factor.

On 6 October 2006, Fuller gave birth to Trease Alynette, her only child with her husband, Jonathan. The couple divorced In 2009 after a 14-year marriage. Fuller is a star of the Kendra Wilkinson reality-TV show Kendra, and also pursues a professional art career, producing Pop art paintings, prints and sculptures based on the Playboy world.

== The Amazing Race ==
=== The Amazing Race 6 ===
In August 2004, Fuller competed on the sixth season of the CBS adventure reality show The Amazing Race with her husband at the time, Jonathan Baker. They were eliminated at the end of the eighth leg, finishing in sixth place.

=== The Amazing Race 6 finishes ===
- An italicized placement means it is Jonathan and Victoria's placement at the midpoint of a double leg.
- A red placement with a dagger (†) indicates that Jonathan and Victoria were eliminated.

Roadblocks performed by Fuller are bolded

Episode	Leg	Destination(s)	Detour choice (underlined)	Roadblock performance	Placement	Notes
1	1	United States → Iceland	Ice climb/Ice search	No roadblock	5th of 11	
2	2	Iceland → Norway	Endurance/Accuracy	Jonathan	2nd of 10	
3	3	Norway → Sweden	Count it/Build it	**Victoria**	4th of 9	
4	4	Sweden → Senegal	Stack 'em up/Pull 'em up	Jonathan	2nd of 8	
5	5	Senegal → Germany	Beers/Brats	Jonathan	2nd of 8	
6	6	Germany → Hungary	Catapault crash/Cannonball run	**Victoria**	3rd of 7	(Note: Leg 6 was a double-length leg, with two Detours and two Roadblocks, shown over two episodes. The placement listed in the top row reflect the order teams arrived at the leg's halfway point.)
8	6	Germany → Hungary	Swim/Paddle	**Victoria**	3rd of 7	(Note: Leg 6 was a double-length leg, with two Detours and two Roadblocks, shown over two episodes. The placement listed in the top row reflect the order teams arrived at the leg's halfway point.)
9	7	Hungary → France	Climb up/Fly behind	Jonathan	5th of 6	
10	8	France → Ethiopia	Raise the roof/Mud the hut	**Victoria**	6th of 6†	

== TV guest appearances ==
- The Amazing Race 6 playing "Herself", (2004) TV Series
- Dr. Phil playing "Herself" in episode: "A Dr. Phil Primetime Special: Romance Rescue" February 15, 2005
- Whose Line Is It Anyway? playing "Herself" (episode # 4.24) January 31, 2002
- Howard Stern playing "Herself" March 19, 2001
- David Lee Roth - No Holds Bar B Que playing "Herself" - 2001
- The Man Show playing "Herself" in episode: "Playboy Mansion" (episode # 2.13) September 10, 2000
- Married... with Children playing "Model #2" in episode: "Torch Song Duet" (episode # 10.26) May 19, 1996
- The Girls Next Door playing "Herself" Baby Shower thrown by Hugh Hefner's main girlfriend, Holly

Victoria Fuller	Kona Carmack	Priscilla Taylor	Gillian Bonner	Shauna Sand	Karin Taylor
Angel Boris	Jessica Lee	Jennifer Allan	Nadine Chanz	Ulrika Ericsson	Victoria Silvstedt
