= Kill Reality =

- Genre: Reality
- Directed by: Kathy Wetherell
- Starring: Robert Kubilos; Banzai Vitale; Jonathan Baker
- Country of origin: United States
- Original language: English
- No. of seasons: 1
- No. of episodes: 8

Production
- Production location: Simi Valley, California
- Running time: 60 minutes
- Production company: Creative Light Entertainment

Original release
- Network: E!
- Release: July 25 – October 31, 2005

Kill Reality is a 2005 series which ran on E! Entertainment television about the all-stars of reality television making a horror movie called The Scorned. During the filming of the movie the cast lived together in a house that quickly turned into the real house of horrors. The series ended when, on the final episode, Jonny Fairplay was removed from the house for defecating on Trish Schneider's bed while she was sleeping in it.

E! was supposed to have aired The Scorned on September 24, 2005, however, the film was delayed and had its premiere on Halloween later that year.

== Cast ==
The show's stars consist of "actors" and "producers" all of whom took part in reality television:

- Steven Hill of The Real World: Las Vegas
- Tonya Cooley of The Real World: Chicago
- Jon Dalton of Survivor: Pearl Islands
- Reichen Lehmkuhl of The Amazing Race 4
- Trishelle Cannatella of The Real World: Las Vegas
- Trish Schneider of The Bachelor
- Stacie Jones Upchurch of The Apprentice
- Bob Guiney of The Bachelor
- Ethan Zohn of Survivor: Africa and Survivor: All-Stars
- Jenna Morasca of Survivor: The Amazon and Survivor: All-Stars
- Toni Ferrari of Love Cruise and Paradise Hotel
- Erika Landin of Big Brother 4
- Katie Doyle of Road Rules: The Quest
- Rob Cesternino of Survivor: The Amazon and Survivor: All-Stars
