= The Amazing Race 6 =

Season of television series

- Season 6
- Region 1 DVD cover
- Presented by: Phil Keoghan
- No. of teams: 11
- Winners: Freddy Holliday & Kendra Bentley
- No. of legs: 12
- Distance traveled: 40,000 mi (64,000 km)
- No. of episodes: 13 (including 1 recap)

Release
- Original network: CBS
- Original release: November 16, 2004 – February 8, 2005

Additional information
- Filming dates: August 13 – September 12, 2004

Series chronology
- ← Previous; Season 5 Next → Season 7

The Amazing Race 6 is the sixth season of the American reality competition show The Amazing Race. Hosted by Phil Keoghan, it featured eleven teams of two, each with a pre-existing relationship, competing in a race around the world. This season visited four continents and ten countries, traveling approximately 40,000 miles (64,000 km) over twelve legs. Filming took place from August 13 to September 12, 2004. Starting in Chicago, Illinois, racers traveled through Iceland, Norway, Sweden, Senegal, Germany, Hungary, France, Ethiopia, Sri Lanka, and China, before returning to the United States, traveling through Hawaii and finishing in Chicago. New elements introduced in this season include the double-length leg and limiting the number of Roadblocks that each team member could perform. The season premiered on CBS on November 16, 2004, and concluded on February 8, 2005.

Engaged models Freddy Holliday and Kendra Bentley were the winners of this season, while dating couple Jon Buehler and Kris Perkins finished in second place, and exes Adam Malis and Rebecca Cardon finished in third place.

== Format ==
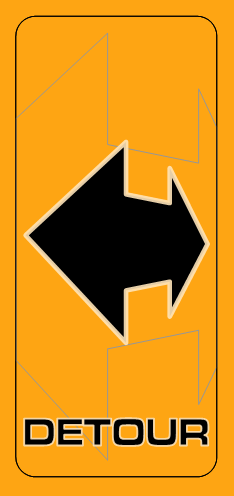
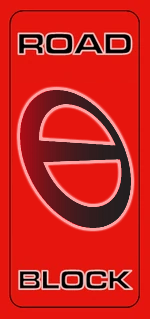
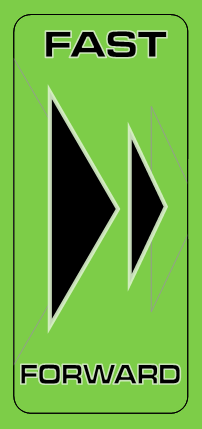
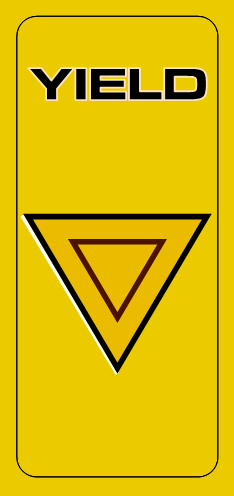
The clues which contestants receive during the course of the race generally fall into five categories: Route Info, Detour, Roadblock, Fast Forward, and Yield.

The Amazing Race is a reality television show created by Bertram van Munster and Elise Doganieri, and hosted by Phil Keoghan. The series follows teams of two competing in a race around the world. Each leg of the race requires teams to deduce clues, navigate foreign environments, interact with locals, perform physical and mental challenges, and travel on a limited budget provided by the show. At each stop during the leg, teams receive clues inside sealed envelopes, which fall into one of these categories:

- Route Info: These are simple instructions that teams must follow before they can receive their next clue.
- Detour: A Detour is a choice between two tasks. Teams may choose either task and switch tasks if they find one option too difficult. There is usually one Detour present on each leg.
- Roadblock: A Roadblock is a task that only one team member can complete. Teams must choose which member will complete the task based on a brief clue they receive before fully learning the details of the task. There is usually one Roadblock present on each leg.
- Fast Forward: A Fast Forward is a task that only one team may complete, which allows that team to skip all remaining tasks on the leg and go directly to the next Pit Stop. Teams may only claim one Fast Forward during the entire race.
- Yield: The Yield allows one team to force another team to stop racing for a predetermined amount of time before they can continue the race. Teams may use the Yield only one time during the entire race.

Most teams that arrive last at the Pit Stop of each leg are progressively eliminated, while the first team to arrive at the finish line in the final episode wins the grand prize of US$1,000,000.

== Production ==
=== Development and filming ===
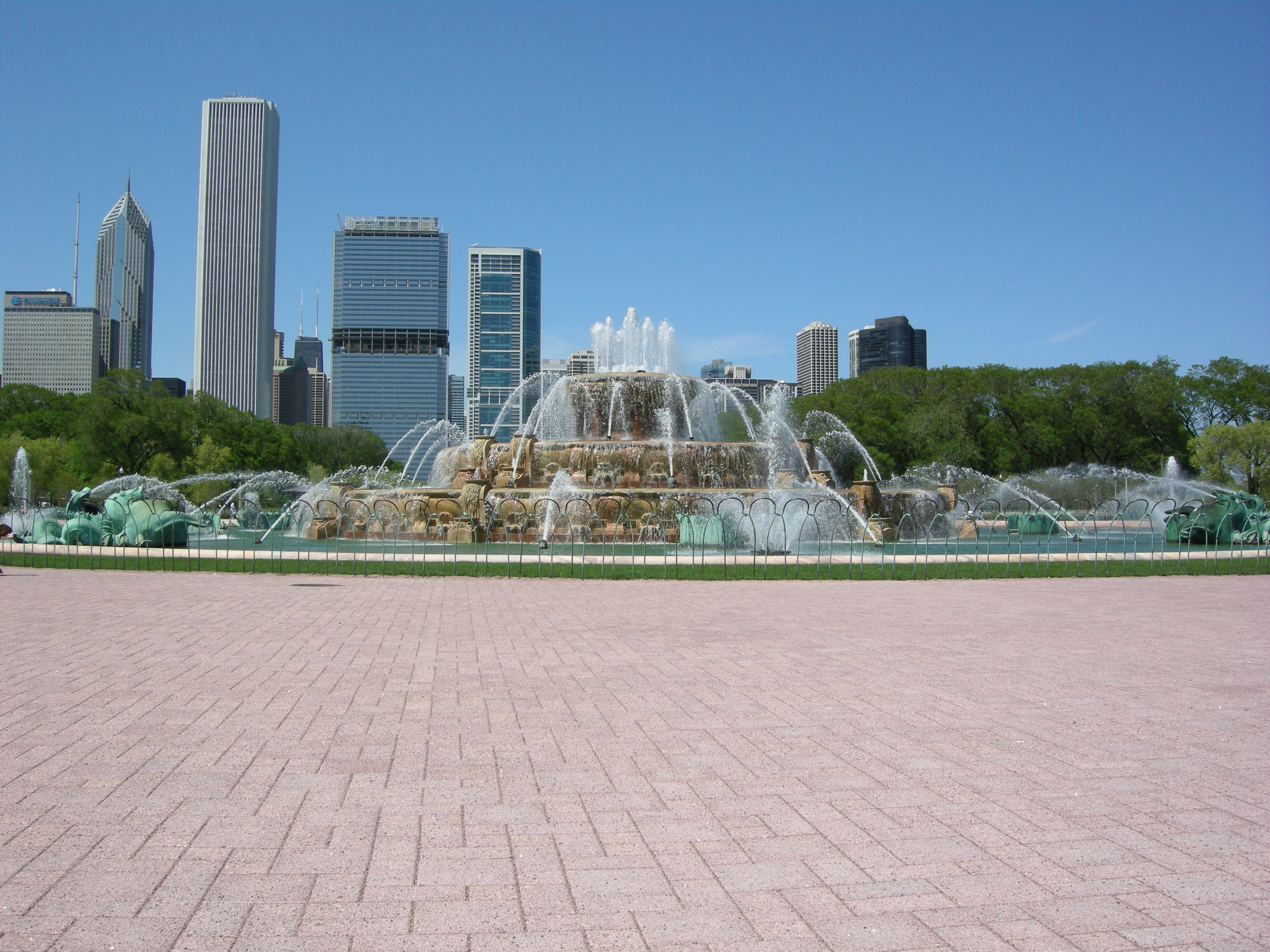
Chicago's Buckingham Fountain was the starting line of The Amazing Race 6.

In May 2004, CBS ordered the sixth season of the show, despite the fact that The Amazing Race 5 had not yet aired. Early renewal was likely due to the success of the changes made in season 5. CBS also delayed the airing of season 6 until late in the fall and moved it out of its proposed Saturday timeslot in order to create a "cool down" period between races, hoping that this would help continue the newfound ratings success.

The Amazing Race 6 spanned a total of 40,000 miles (64,000 km) over ten countries on four continents. The 30 days of filming began on August 13, 2004, and finished on September 12.

This season was the first in which team members had to complete an equal number of Roadblock tasks. No team member was permitted to complete more than six Roadblocks on the entire race. Throughout the season, host Phil Keoghan verbally stated this rule when introducing each leg's Roadblock. This season also reduced the number of times the Yield appeared to three, compared to the previous season, where the Yield had been featured in nearly every leg.

A task in the second leg marked the first time that teams were required to work with each other. The 10 teams had to split themselves into two groups of five, each of which had to row a Viking boat across a fjord.

According to Aaron Crumbaugh, the sixth leg was originally planned as two separate legs with the first part being a non-elimination point, where the losing team would have been stripped of their money. However, those planned legs were combined into one after producers realized that begging was illegal in Hungary.

This season featured a visit to Sri Lanka, where filming occurred just a few months before the 2004 Indian Ocean earthquake and tsunami. The episodes aired four weeks after the earthquake had devastated the locations the teams had visited. A special message was inserted at the beginning of the episodes in Sri Lanka, dedicating them to the victims and to those helping with the recovery.

== Contestants ==
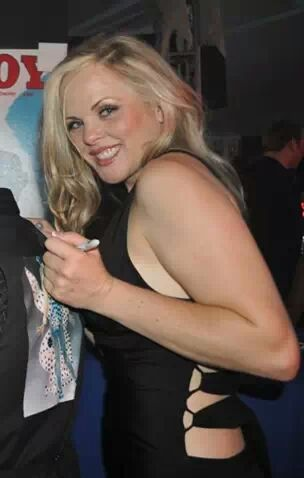
Victoria Fuller

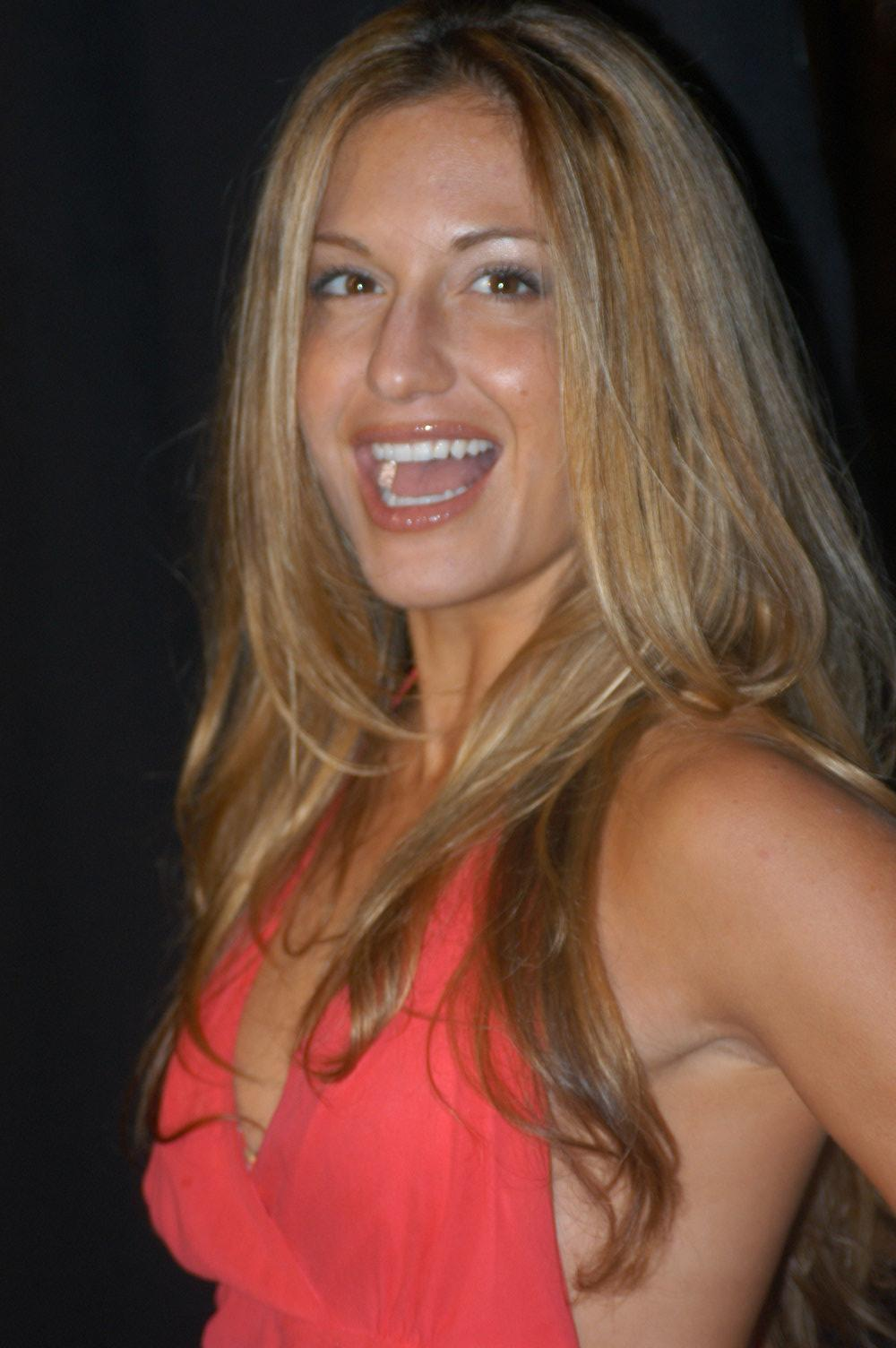
Rebecca Cardon

This season's cast included 11 teams. Early Show hosts Harry Smith and Dave Price ran the season's first leg with the actual teams as part of a special segment on their morning show.

Contestants	Age	Relationship	Hometown	Status
Avi Schneier	32	High School Buddies	Brooklyn, New York	Eliminated 1st (in Grindavík, Iceland)
Joe Rashbaum	32	High School Buddies	Ventura, California	Eliminated 1st (in Grindavík, Iceland)
Meredith Tufaro	26	Best Friends	Queens, New York	Eliminated 2nd (in Voss, Norway)
Maria Sampogna	26	Best Friends	Queens, New York	Eliminated 2nd (in Voss, Norway)
Lena Jensen	23	Sisters	Pleasant Grove, Utah	Eliminated 3rd (in Häggvik, Sweden)
Kristy Jensen	26	Sisters	Pleasant Grove, Utah	Eliminated 3rd (in Häggvik, Sweden)
Don St. Claire	69	Grandparents	Portola Valley, California	Eliminated 4th (in Berlin, Germany)
Mary Jean St. Claire	66	Grandparents	Portola Valley, California	Eliminated 4th (in Berlin, Germany)
Gus McLeod	50	Father & Daughter	Gaithersburg, Maryland	Eliminated 5th (in Budapest, Hungary)
Hera McLeod	24	Father & Daughter	Los Angeles, California	Eliminated 5th (in Budapest, Hungary)
Jonathan Baker	42	Married Entrepreneurs	Los Angeles, California	Eliminated 6th (in Lalibela, Ethiopia)
Victoria Fuller	32	Married Entrepreneurs	Los Angeles, California	Eliminated 6th (in Lalibela, Ethiopia)
Lori Harvey	33	Married Pro Wrestlers	Molino, Florida	Eliminated 7th (in Sigiriya, Sri Lanka)
Bolo Dar'tainian	38	Married Pro Wrestlers	Molino, Florida	Eliminated 7th (in Sigiriya, Sri Lanka)
Hayden Kristianson	25	Dating Actors	Chicago, Illinois	Eliminated 8th (in Xi'an, China)
Aaron Crumbaugh	25	Dating Actors	Chicago, Illinois	Eliminated 8th (in Xi'an, China)
Adam Malis	27	Formerly Dating	Los Angeles, California	Third place
Rebecca Cardon	29	Formerly Dating	Los Angeles, California	Third place
Kris Perkins	30	Dating Long Distance	Long Beach, California	Runners-up
Jon Buehler	29	Dating Long Distance	Scottsdale, Arizona	Runners-up
Freddy Holliday	34	Engaged Models	Miami, Florida	Winners
Kendra Bentley	25	Engaged Models	Miami, Florida	Winners

Future appearances

Jonathan & Victoria appeared on a special episode of Dr. Phil to try to improve their marriage. Jonathan & Victoria then competed on Battle of the Network Reality Stars. Later, in a celebrity version of Fear Factor, Victoria attacked contestant Jon "Jonny Fairplay" Dalton (of Survivor: Pearl Islands), and Jonathan attacked host Joe Rogan, resulting in their expulsion from the show. Aaron competed on the twelfth season of Food Network Star and on Cutthroat Kitchen.

== Results ==
The following teams are listed with their placements in each leg. Placements are listed in finishing order.

- A red placement with a dagger (†) indicates that the team was eliminated.
- An underlined blue placement with a double-dagger (‡) indicates that the team was the last to arrive at a Pit Stop in a non-elimination leg. As a penalty, they were stripped of all their money and were not given any at the start of the next leg.
- An italicized placement identifies a team's placement at the midpoint of a double leg.
- A green ƒ indicates that the team won the Fast Forward.
- A brown > indicates that the team used the Yield and a brown < indicates the team on the receiving end of the Yield.

Team placement (by leg)
Team	1	2	3	4	5	6a (Note: This was a double leg with two Detours and two Roadblocks shown over two episodes. The placements listed for the first half are the order of the teams' arrival at the Net Klub Internet Kafé in Budapest.)	6b	7	8	9	10	11	12
Freddy & Kendra	4th	7th (Note: Freddy and Kendra initially arrived 6th, but were issued a 30-minute penalty for taking an extra clue from the clue box. Adam and Rebecca and Don and Mary Jean checked in during this penalty time, dropping Freddy and Kendra to 8th. However, due to a penalty received by Don and Mary Jean, Freddy and Kendra moved up to 7th.)	6th	5th	1st	1st	6th	2nd	4th< (Note: Adam and Rebecca chose to use the Yield on Freddy and Kendra.)	3rd	2nd> (Note: Freddy and Kendra chose to use the Yield on Adam and Rebecca.)	2nd	1st
Kris & Jon	2nd	1st	2nd	1st	4th	5th	2nd	4th	3rd	1st	3rd	1st	2nd
Adam & Rebecca	7th	6th	5th	6th	6th	6th	5th	1stƒ	5th>	4th	4th‡<	3rd	3rd
Hayden & Aaron	1st	4th	1st	4th	3rd	4th	4th	6th‡	1st	2nd	1st	4th† (Note: Hayden and Aaron initially arrived 3rd, but were issued a 4-hour penalty for quitting the Roadblock. Adam and Rebecca checked in during this penalty time, dropping Hayden and Aaron to last.)	
Lori & Bolo	6th	5th	7th	3rd	7th	7th	1stƒ	3rd	2nd	5th†			
Jonathan & Victoria	5th	2nd	4th	2nd	2nd	3rd	3rd	5th	6th†				
Gus & Hera	10th	3rd	3rd	7th	5th	2nd	7th†						
Don & Mary Jean	9th	8th (Note: Don and Mary Jean arrived 7th in leg 2, but they had mistakenly driven the car that belonged to Adam and Rebecca. They left 8th at the beginning of leg 3 after they were issued a 30-minute penalty.)	8th	8th‡	8th†								
Lena & Kristy	3rd	9th	9th†										
Meredith & Maria	8th	10th†											
Avi & Joe	11th†												

== Race summary ==
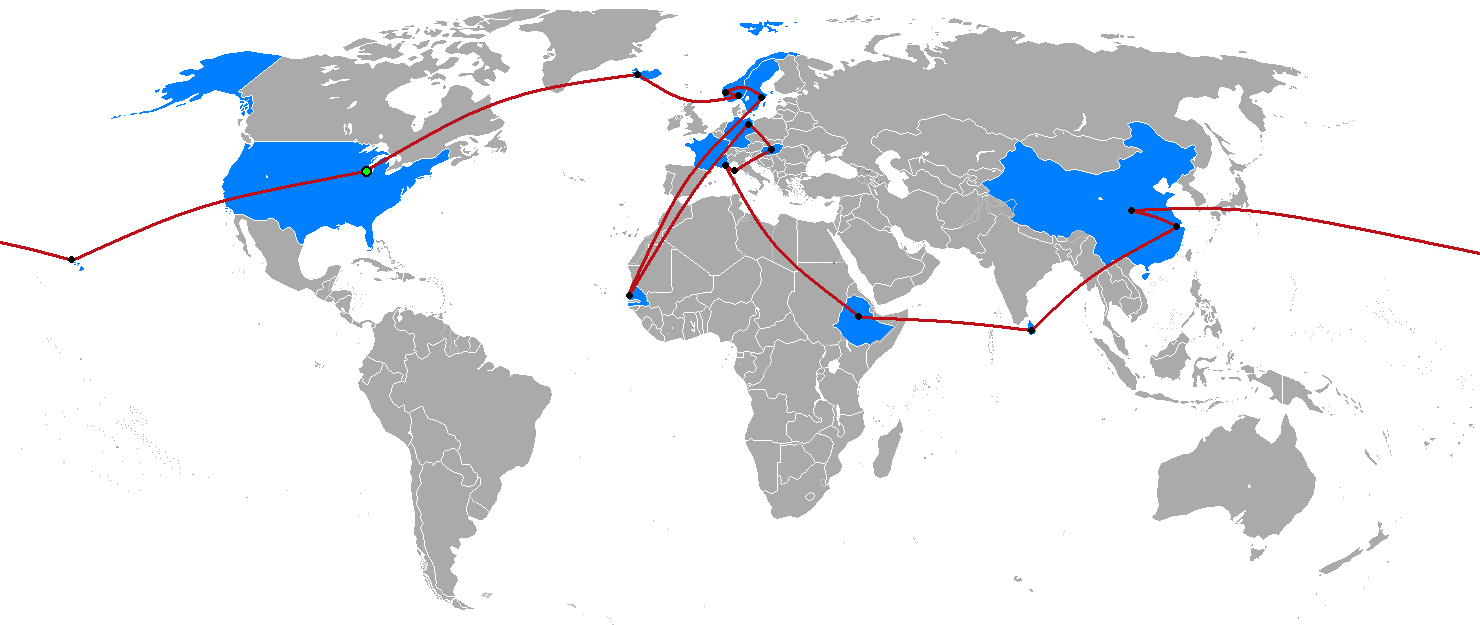
The route of The Amazing Race 6.

Destinations	Air travel Rail travel Water travel Bus travel Helicopter travel Bicycle travel Gondola travel
Route Markers	Detour Roadblock Fast Forward Yield Pit Stop

=== Leg 1 (United States → Iceland) ===
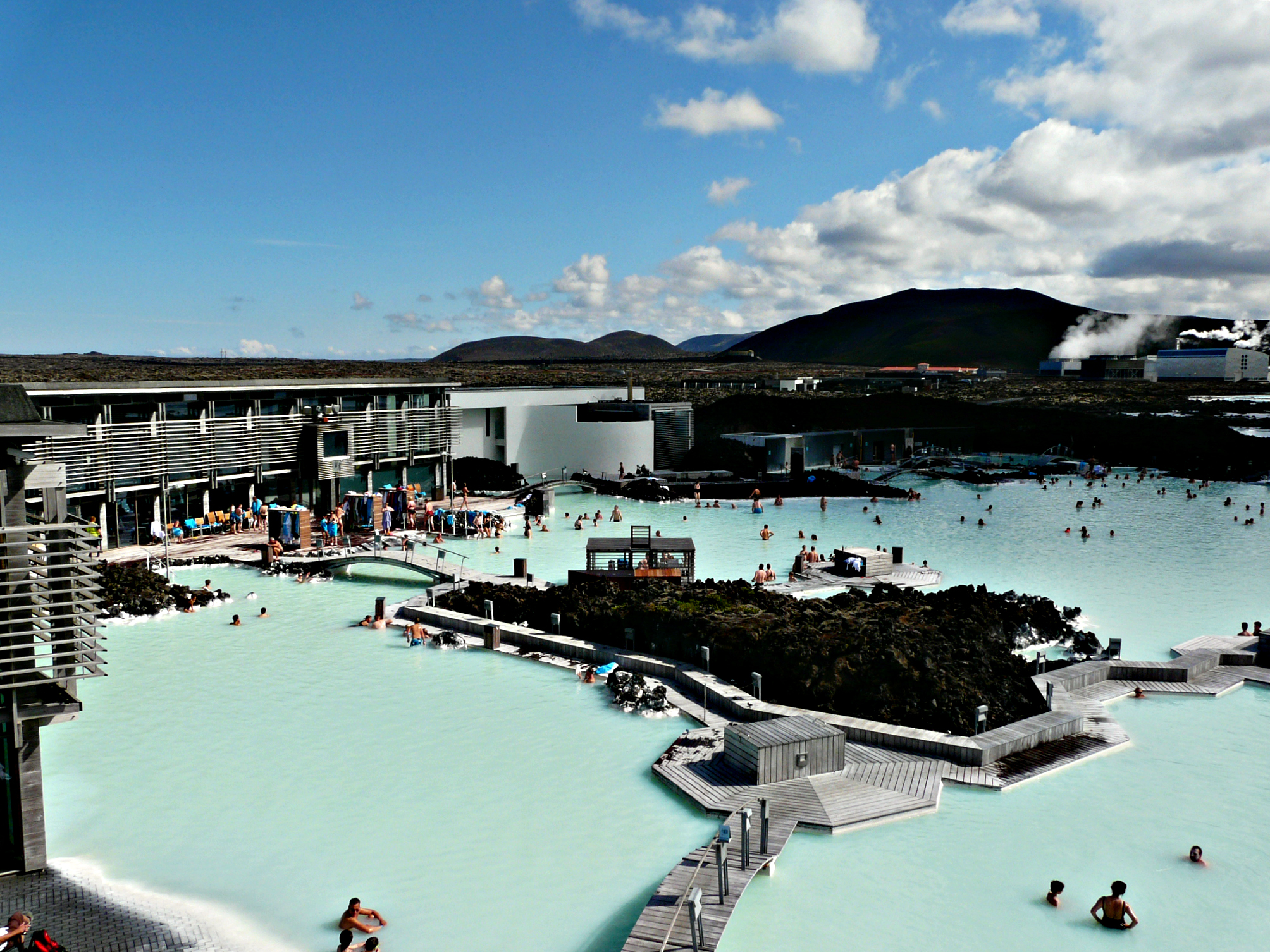
Teams finished the first leg in Iceland at the Blue Lagoon.

- Episode 1: "The Game's Afoot" (November 16, 2004)
- Prize: A vacation to Hawaii (awarded to Hayden and Aaron)
- Eliminated: Avi and Joe

Locations

- Chicago, Illinois (Buckingham Fountain) (Starting Line)
- Chicago (O'Hare International Airport)
- Chicago → Reykjavík, Iceland (Keflavík International Airport)
- Suðurland (Seljalandsfoss Waterfall)
- Suðurland (Vatnajökull)
- Hornafjörður (Breiðamerkursandur)
- Svínafell (Hótel Skaftafell) or Hornafjörður (Jökulsárlón)
- Grindavík (Blue Lagoon)

Episode summary

- From Buckingham Fountain, teams had to race into downtown Chicago and travel by subway to O'Hare International Airport, where they had to fly to Reykjavík, Iceland. Once there, teams were instructed to drive to the Seljalandsfoss waterfall, where they found their next clue.
- At the base of Vatnajökull, teams had to sign up for a shuttle bus to take them 10 miles (16 km) to their next clue at the glacier's edge. Teams then had to drive a snowmobile across the glacier to a camp, where they had to choose a tent and a departure time for the next morning. The next morning, teams took a shuttle bus back down the glacier, where they retrieved their next clue, instructing them to drive to Breiðamerkursandur to find their next clue.
- This season's first Detour was a choice between Ice Climb or Ice Search. In Ice Climb, teams had to travel to the Hótel Skaftafell and climb the face of an ice wall to reach their next clue at the top. In Ice Search, teams had to travel to a nearby glacial lagoon and use a boat to search the lagoon with thousands of icebergs for an orange buoy with their next clue.
- After the Detour, teams had to check in at the Pit Stop: the Blue Lagoon in Grindavík.

=== Leg 2 (Iceland → Norway) ===
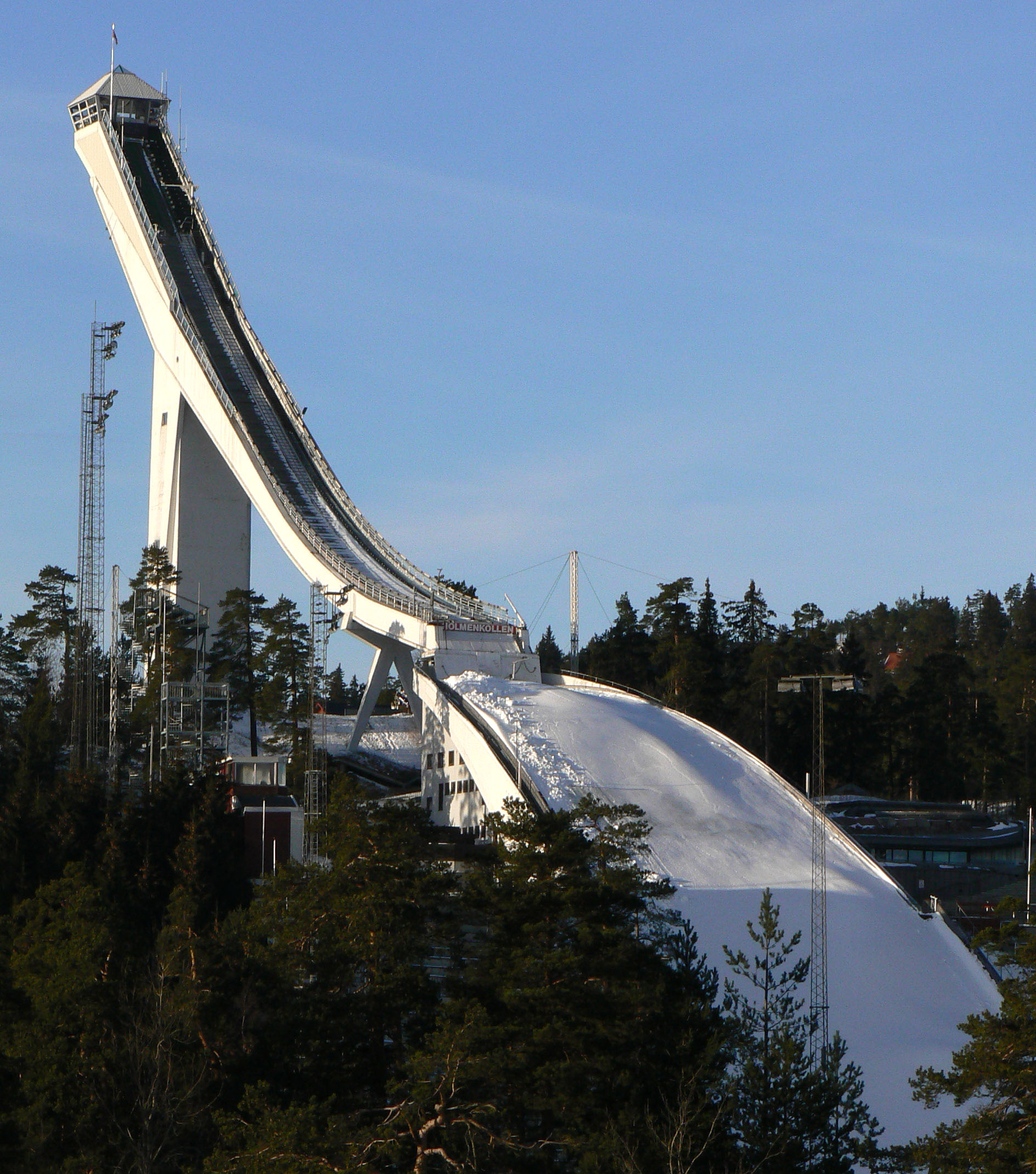
Once in Oslo, teams went to the Holmenkollen ski jump, where one team member had to ride a zipline.

- Episode 2: "I'm Not His Wife, He Doesn't Need to Scream at Me" (November 23, 2004)
- Prize: A seven-night cruise in Alaska (awarded to Kris and Jon)
- Eliminated: Meredith and Maria

Locations

- Grindavík (Blue Lagoon)
- Reykjavík → Oslo, Norway
- Oslo (Holmenkollbakken)
- Brandbu (Raukr Viking Village)
- Hønefoss → Vossavangen
- Voss (Bridge)
- Voss (Nesheimstunet)

Episode summary

- At the start of this leg, teams were instructed to fly to Oslo, Norway. Once there, teams had to travel to the Holmenkollbakken to find their next clue.
- In this season's first Roadblock, one team member had to climb to the top of the ski jump and then ride a zipline to the bottom to receive their next clue.
- After the Roadblock, teams had to travel to the Viking village at Brandbu, where the ten teams were split into two groups and each group had to row a Viking ship across a fjord to their next clue. Teams were instructed to travel by train to Voss and then drive to a specific bridge, where they found their next clue.
- This leg's Detour was a choice between Endurance or Accuracy. In Endurance, teams had to roller ski down a 1.75-mile (2.82 km) course to receive their next clue. In Accuracy, teams had to complete three Viking games – kubbs, axe throwing, and archery – to receive their next clue.
- After the Detour, teams had to check in at the Pit Stop: the Nesheimstunet in Voss.

=== Leg 3 (Norway → Sweden) ===
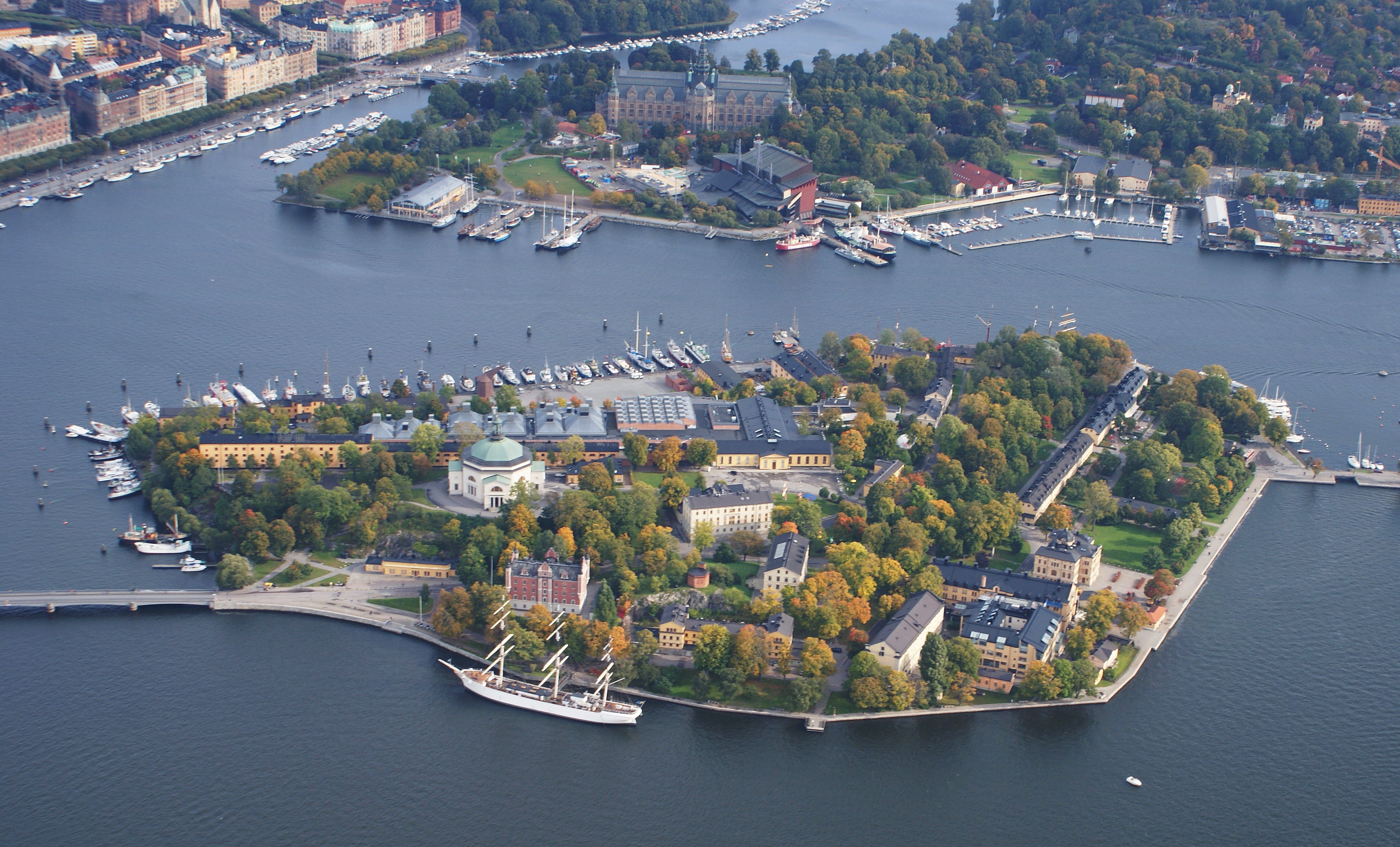
Teams checked in at the Pit Stop on the island of Skeppsholmen in Stockholm, Sweden.

- Episode 3: "Counting Bears Is Not Rocket Science" (November 30, 2004)
- Prize: A seven-night cruise to the Mexican Riviera (awarded to Hayden and Aaron)
- Eliminated: Lena and Kristy

Locations

- Voss (Nesheimstunet)
- Voss → Oslo
- Oslo → Stockholm, Sweden
- Stockholm (Nordic Sea Hotel – Ice Bar)
- Stockholm (Kungens Kurva – IKEA)
- Stockholm → Häggvik
- Häggvik (Bögs Gård Farm)
- Häggvik → Stockholm
- Stockholm (Skeppsholmen – af Chapman)

Episode summary

- At the start of this leg, teams were instructed to return to Oslo by train and then travel by bus to Stockholm, Sweden. Once there, teams had to travel to the Ice Bar of the Nordic Sea Hotel, where each team member had to slide ice shot glasses across the bar. If either team member landed a glass on a target at the end, they could receive their next clue, which directed them to the IKEA store in Kungens Kurva. If both members missed, they had to go back to the end of the line before trying again.
- This leg's Detour was a choice between Count It or Build It. In Count It, teams had to count the number of cooking pots, frying pans, and stuffed animals in three large bins and give the correct number to the supervisor to receive their next clue. In Build It, teams had to properly assemble a desk using all of the provided parts to receive their next clue.
- After the Detour, teams had to travel by train to Häggvik and then ride a tandem bicycle two miles (3.2 km) to Bögs Gård Farm to find their next clue.
- In this leg's Roadblock, one team member had to unroll and search through 270 hay bales until they found their next clue inside one of 20 bales.
- After the Roadblock, teams had to ride their tandem bicycle back to the train station, travel by train back to Stockholm, and then check in at the Pit Stop aboard the af Chapman, moored at Skeppsholmen.

Additional notes

- The hay bale task was later revisited in season 15 as a Switchback.
- Lena spent over eight hours unrolling hay bales, but was never able to find a clue during the Roadblock. Two hours after all of the other teams had checked in at the Pit Stop, Phil came out to the farm to inform Lena and Kristy of their elimination.

=== Leg 4 (Sweden → Senegal) ===
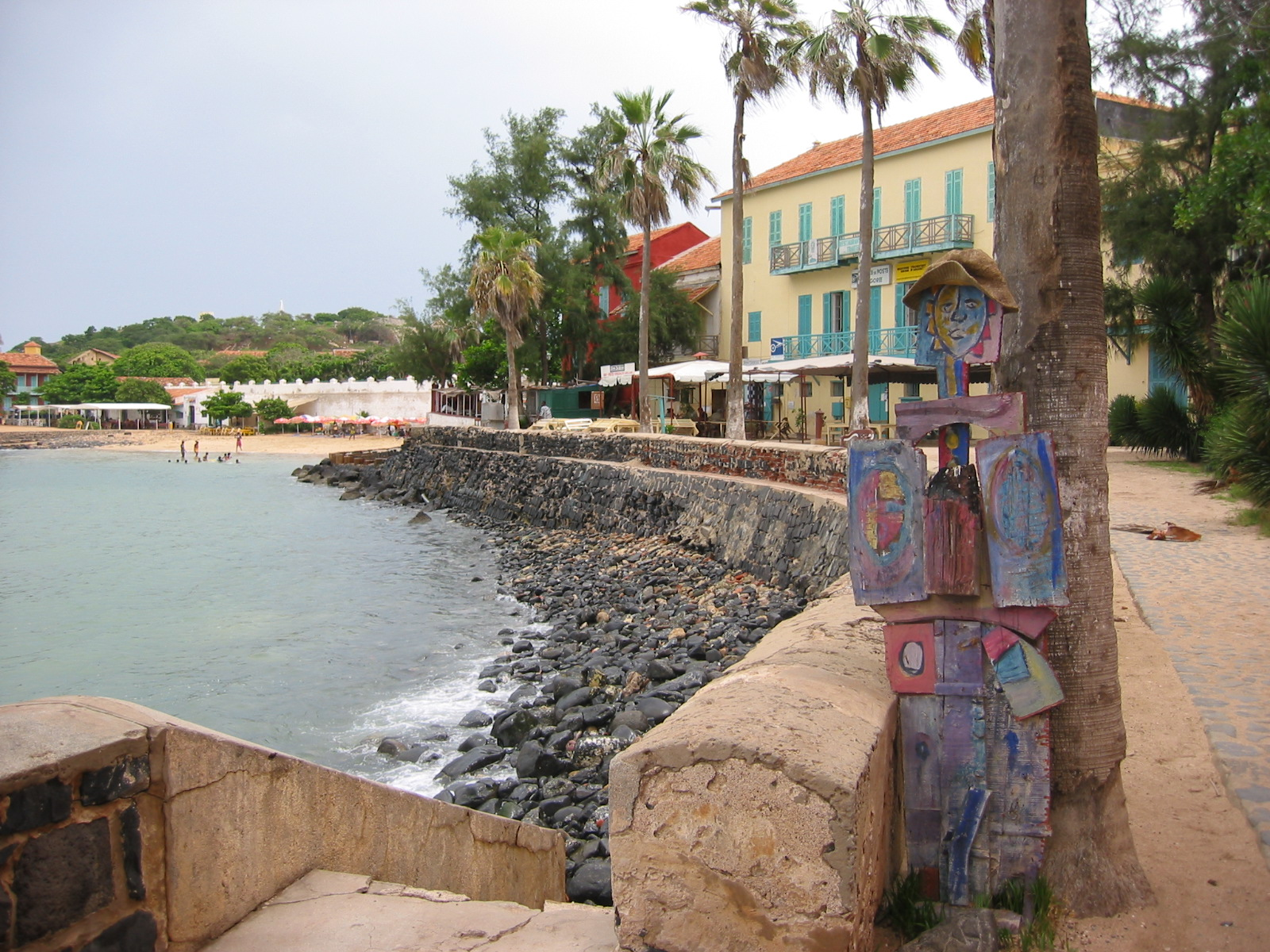
Teams finished this leg in Senegal on the streets of Gorée Island.

- Episode 4: "What If It Isn't Sanitary" (December 7, 2004)
- Prize: A seven-night cruise to the Western Caribbean (awarded to Kris and Jon)

Locations

- Stockholm (Skeppsholmen – af Chapman)
- Stockholm (Town Hall Tower)
- Stockholm → Dakar, Senegal (Léopold Sédar Senghor International Airport)
- Dakar (Cimetière Bel-Air)
- Kayar (Vieux Ngom Carpenter Shop)
- Cap-Vert (Lac Rose)
- Dakar → Gorée Island
- Gorée Island (Rue des Batteries)

Episode summary

- At the start of this episode, teams went to the Town Hall Tower in Stockholm, where they were instructed to fly to Dakar, Senegal. Once there, teams had to search outside the airport for their next clue, which included the poem "Femme noire", and instructions to find the author's grave. Teams had to figure out that the author was Léopold Sédar Senghor, the first President of Senegal, whose grave was at the Bel Aire Cemetery. There, the teams' next clue directed them to the Vieux Ngom Carpenter Shop.
- This leg's Detour was a choice between Stack 'Em Up or Pull 'Em Up. In Stack 'Em Up, teams had to carry baskets of fish to a drying table and properly stack enough fish to cover the table and receive their next clue. In Pull 'Em Up, teams had to use traditional fishing gear to catch four fish and then bring the fish to the shore, where they received their next clue.
- After the Detour, teams had to travel to the Lac Rose, where they found their next clue.
- In this leg's Roadblock, one team member had to use the tools provided to harvest enough salt from the bed of the lake and fill a 25-US-gallon (95 L) basket to receive their next clue.
- After the Roadblock, teams had to travel by ferry to Gorée Island and find the Pit Stop.

Additional note

- This was a non-elimination leg.

=== Leg 5 (Senegal → Germany) ===
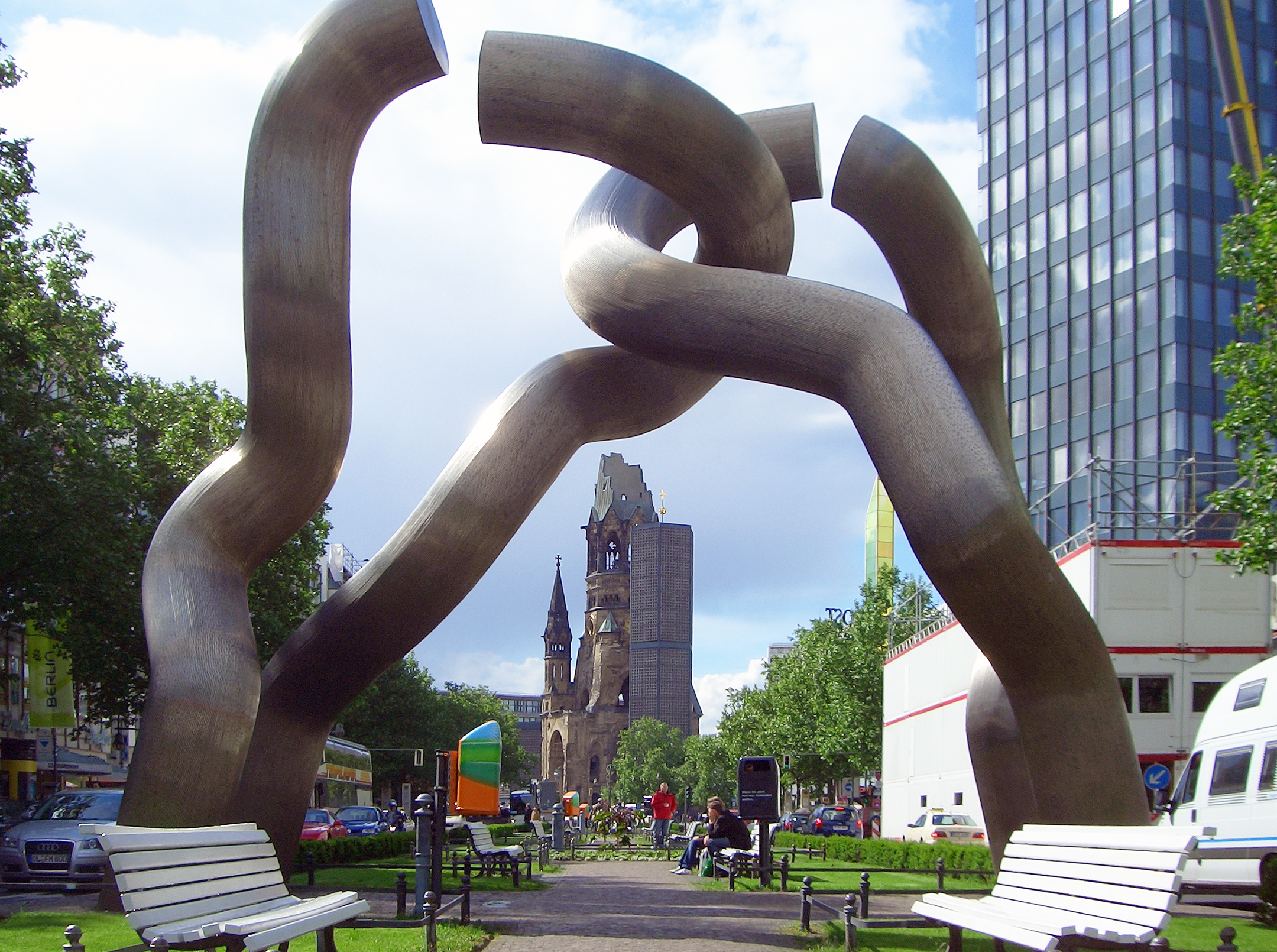
While in Berlin, teams visited the Broken Chain Sculpture, across the street from the partially destroyed Kaiser Wilhelm Memorial Church, for a clue.

- Episode 5: "Quit Following Us" (December 14, 2004)
- Prize: A vacation to Mexico (awarded to Freddy and Kendra)
- Eliminated: Don and Mary Jean

Locations

- Gorée Island (Rue des Batteries)
- Gorée Island (House of Slaves)
- Gorée Island → Dakar
- Dakar → Berlin, Germany
- Berlin (East Side Gallery)
- Berlin (Tauentzienstraße – Broken Chain Sculpture)
- Berlin (Brauhaus Spandau Bar or Zitadelle)
- Berlin (Teufelsberg)
- Berlin (Brandenburg Gate)

Episode summary

- At the start of this leg, teams walked to the House of Slaves, where they learned about the history of the African slave trade on Gorée Island. Afterwards, each team laid a single rose at the historic archway known as the "Door of No Return" as a tribute to the victims before being given their next clue, which instructed teams to fly to Berlin, Germany. Once there, teams traveled to the East Side Gallery, where they searched a stretch of the former Berlin Wall for their next clue. From there, teams traveled to the Broken Chain Sculpture, where they found their next clue.
- This leg's Detour was a choice between Beer or Brats. In Beer, teams traveled to the Brauhaus Spandau, where each team member had to search the tables at the bar for five coasters bearing their teams' names and pictures. They then had to trade two full beer steins to the patron in exchange for each coaster. Once both team members collected five coasters, they received their next clue. In Brats, teams traveled to the Zitadelle, where they had to use a hand-operated sausage maker to create one rope of five bratwursts to receive their next clue.
- After the Detour, teams had to travel to Teufelsberg to find their next clue.
- In this leg's Roadblock, one team member had to climb to the top of Teufelsberg and complete a soap box derby course in 37 seconds or less to receive their next clue.
- Teams had to check in at the Pit Stop: the Brandenburg Gate.

=== Leg 6 (Germany → Hungary) ===
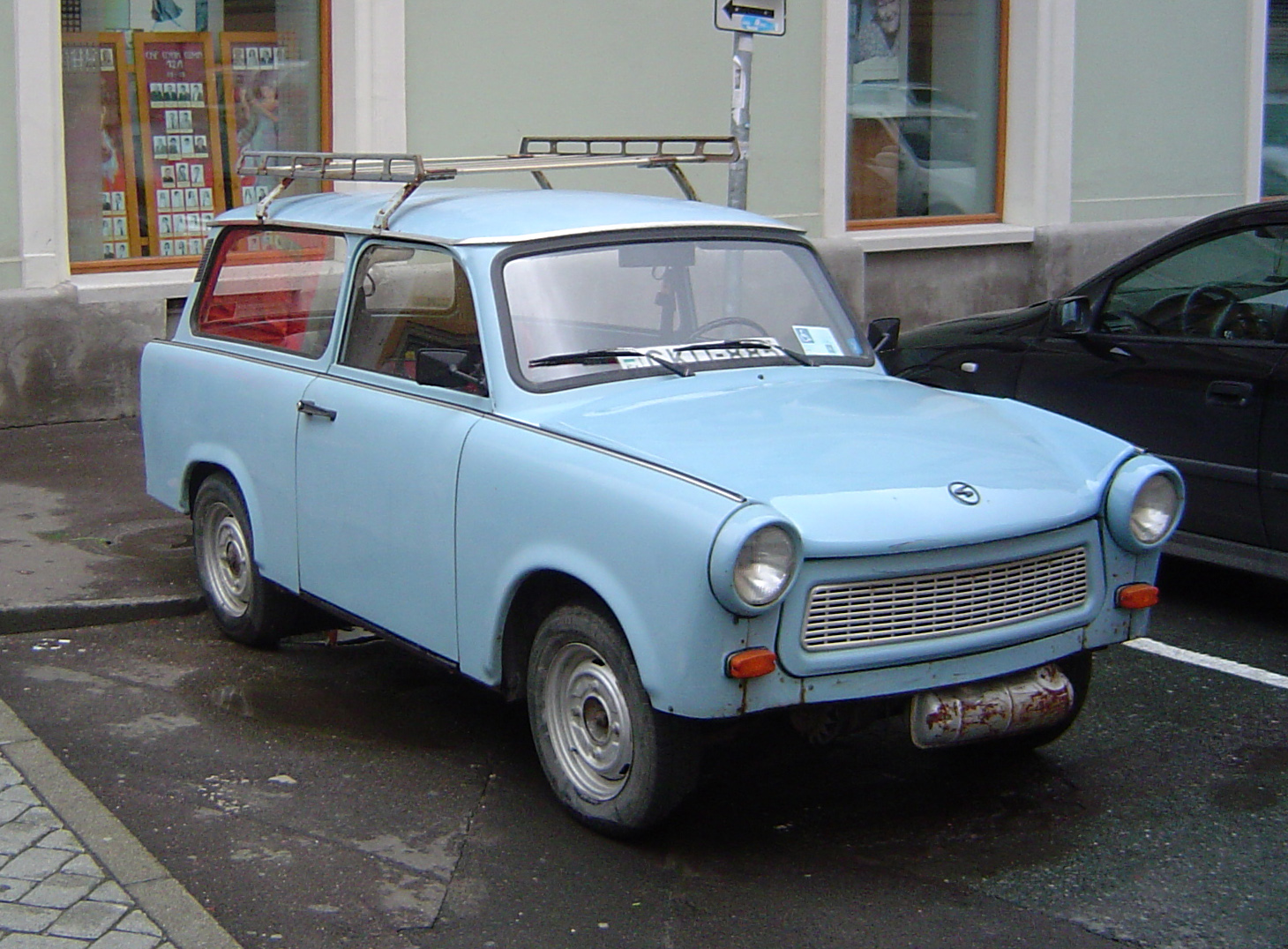
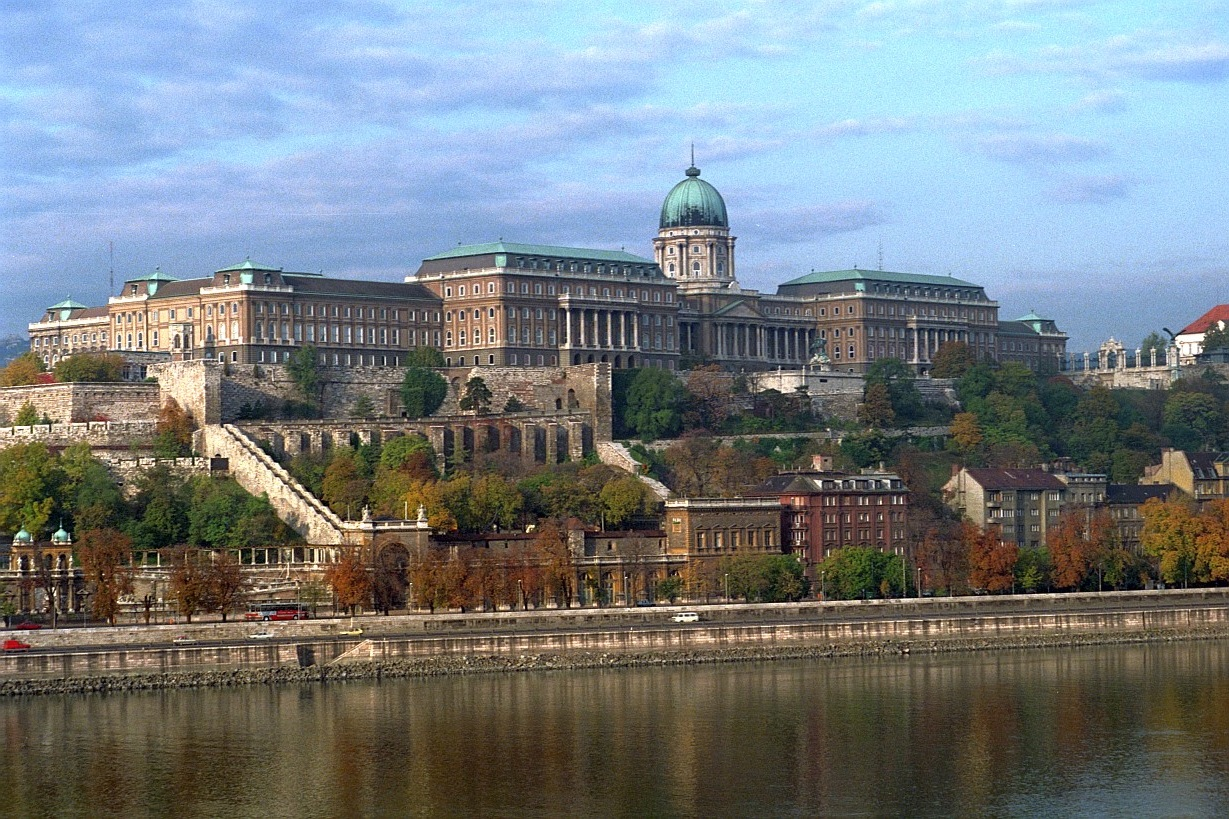
In this double-length leg in Hungary, teams drove a classic Trabant 601 to Eger, and then traveled beneath Buda Castle for the Fast Forward, where one team drank a goblet of pig's blood.
- Episode 6: "They Should Probably Have Some Counseling" (December 21, 2004) & Episode 7: "One of You, I'm Gonna Break in Half" (January 4, 2005)
- Prize: A vacation to Europe (awarded to Lori and Bolo)
- Eliminated: Gus and Hera

Locations

- Berlin (Brandenburg Gate)
- Berlin (Checkpoint Charlie)
- Berlin (Olympic Stadium)
- Berlin → Budapest, Hungary
- Eger (Eger Castle)
- Eger → Budapest
- Budapest (Net Klub Internet Kafé)
- Budapest (Heritage Rail Museum)
- Budapest (Buda Castle – Budavári Labirintus)
- Budapest (Margit Island – Alfréd Hajós National Swimming Stadium)
- Budapest (Gundel Restaurant)
- Budapest (Point Zero)
- Budapest (Fisherman's Bastion)

Episode summary (Episode 6)

- At the start of this leg, teams traveled to Checkpoint Charlie, where they received their next clue directing them to the Olympic Stadium.
- In this leg's first Roadblock, one team member was strapped into a "hot rocket bungee" and launched 200 feet (61 m) into the air. After returning to the ground, they received their next clue.
- After the first Roadblock, teams had to fly to Budapest, Hungary. Once there, teams had to drive a Trabant 601 to Eger Castle, where they found their next clue.
- This leg's first Detour was a choice between Catapult Crash or Cannonball Run. In Catapult Crash, teams would have used a catapult to hurl a watermelon onto a wooden target and retrieve the clue hidden within. In Cannonball Run, teams had to push a cannon up a hill to the castle courtyard, and then carry 55 cannonballs and stack them into a pyramid before receiving their next clue. All teams chose Cannonball Run.
- After the first Detour, teams traveled by train back to Budapest and then traveled by taxi to the Net Klub Internet Kafé. Teams received their next clue via e-mail, which informed them that they were still racing.

Episode summary (Episode 7)

- At the Heritage Rail Museum, teams had to ride a draisine at speeds up to 50 miles per hour (80 km/h) down the tracks to their next clue.
- For this season's first Fast Forward, one team had to travel to Buda Castle, descend through a labyrinth, and drink a goblet of pig's blood. Lori and Bolo won the Fast Forward.
- Teams who did not attempt the Fast Forward had to travel by taxi to the Alfréd Hajós National Swimming Stadium, where they found their next clue.
- This leg's second Detour was a choice between Swim or Paddle. In Swim, teams had to play a game of water polo and score one goal against a Hungarian water polo player before receiving their next clue. In Paddle, teams had to inflate a raft with a hand pump, paddle across the Danube River to a flag on the other side, and retrieve their next clue.
- After the second Detour, teams had to travel to the Gundel Restaurant and find their next clue.
- In this leg's second Roadblock, one team member had to eat a 24-ounce (680 g) bowl of a traditional Hungarian spicy soup to receive their next clue.
- After the second Roadblock, teams had to travel to Point Zero, and then either take the funicular or walk to the Pit Stop: Fisherman's Bastion.

Additional note

- Leg 6 was a double leg and aired over two separate episodes.

=== Leg 7 (Hungary → France) ===
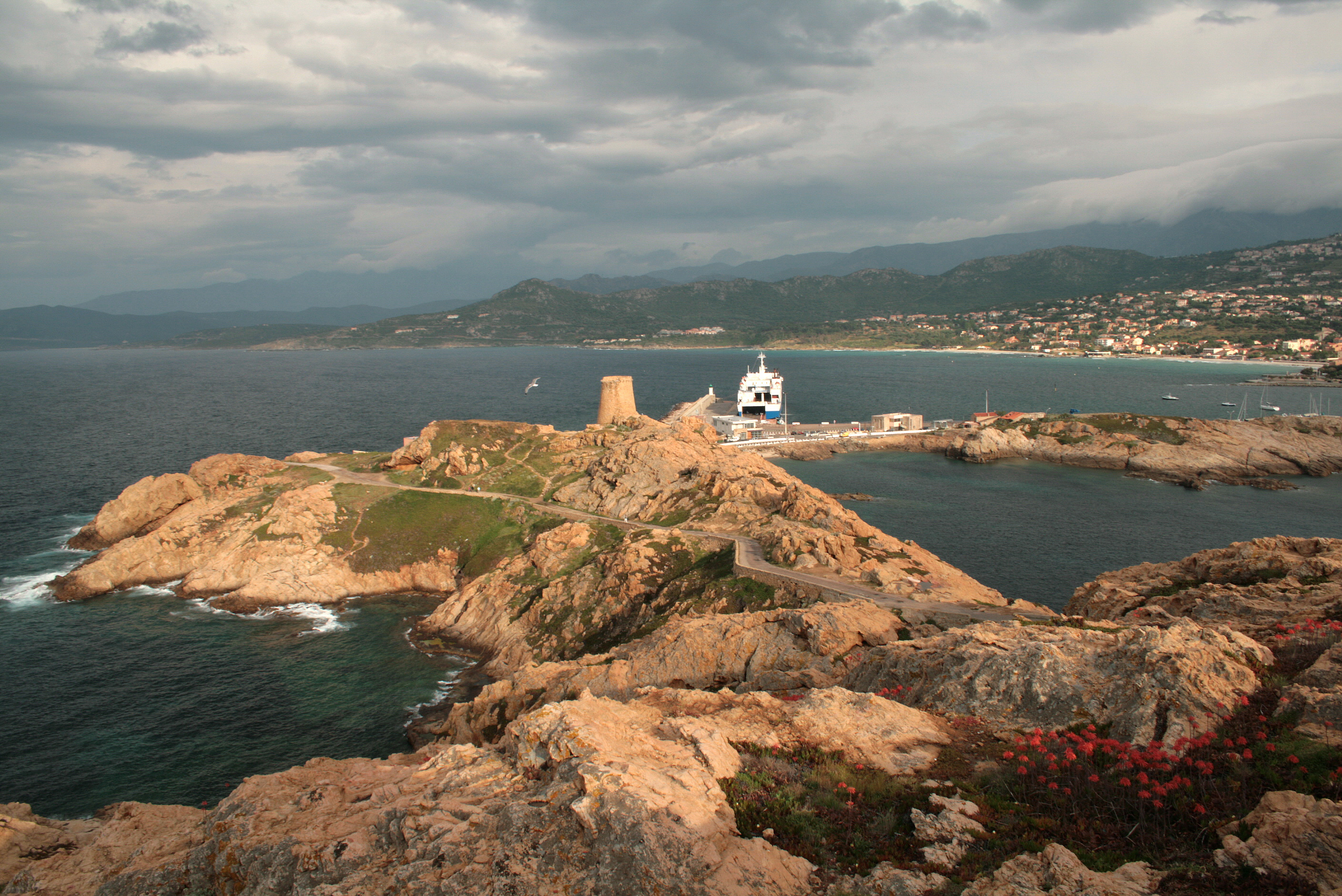
Teams finished this leg at L'Île-Rousse on the French island of Corsica.

- Episode 8: "Tell My Mom I Love Her" (January 11, 2005)
- Prize: A vacation to the Caribbean (awarded to Adam & Rebecca)

Locations

- Budapest (Fisherman's Bastion)
- Budapest (Budafok – Promontor Borudvar)
- Budapest → Ajaccio, France
- Ajaccio (Maison Bonaparte)
- Ajaccio (Ajaccio Harbor)
- Calvi (Camp Raffalli)
- Zilia (Domaine 'Alzipratu Winery)
- L'Île-Rousse (La Pietra)

Episode summary

- At the start of this leg, teams had to travel to the Promontor Borudvar winery and follow a path toward a large wine cask, where they found their next clue, which instructed them to fly to Corsica. Once there, teams had to travel to Napoleon's birthplace and find the room where he was born to receive their next clue.
- For this season's last Fast Forward, one team had to locate a harbor in Ajaccio, don old-style diving suits, and walk across the ocean floor to a lobster trap to retrieve the Fast Forward award. Adam and Rebecca won the Fast Forward.
- Teams who did not attempt the Fast Forward had to drive to Camp Raffalli in Calvi to find their next clue.
- This leg's Detour was a choice between Climb Up or Fly Behind. In Climb Up, teams had to use a mechanical ascender to climb a rock wall. Once at the top, teams had to find a French legionnaire officer, who gave them a medal, and then rappel back down to receive their next clue. In Fly Behind, teams had to choose a Zodiac boat and, with one member directing the pilot and the other trailing behind on a raft, search among 25 buoys for one with a clue attached.
- After the Detour, teams were instructed to travel to the Domaine 'Alzipratu Winery in Zilia, where they found their next clue.
- In this leg's Roadblock, one team member had to stomp on 55 pounds (25 kg) of grapes until they squeezed enough juice to fill five wine bottles, and then drink a glass of the squeezed juice, to receive their next clue, which directed them to the Pit Stop: La Pietra in L'Île-Rousse.

Additional note

- This was a non-elimination leg.

=== Leg 8 (France → Ethiopia) ===
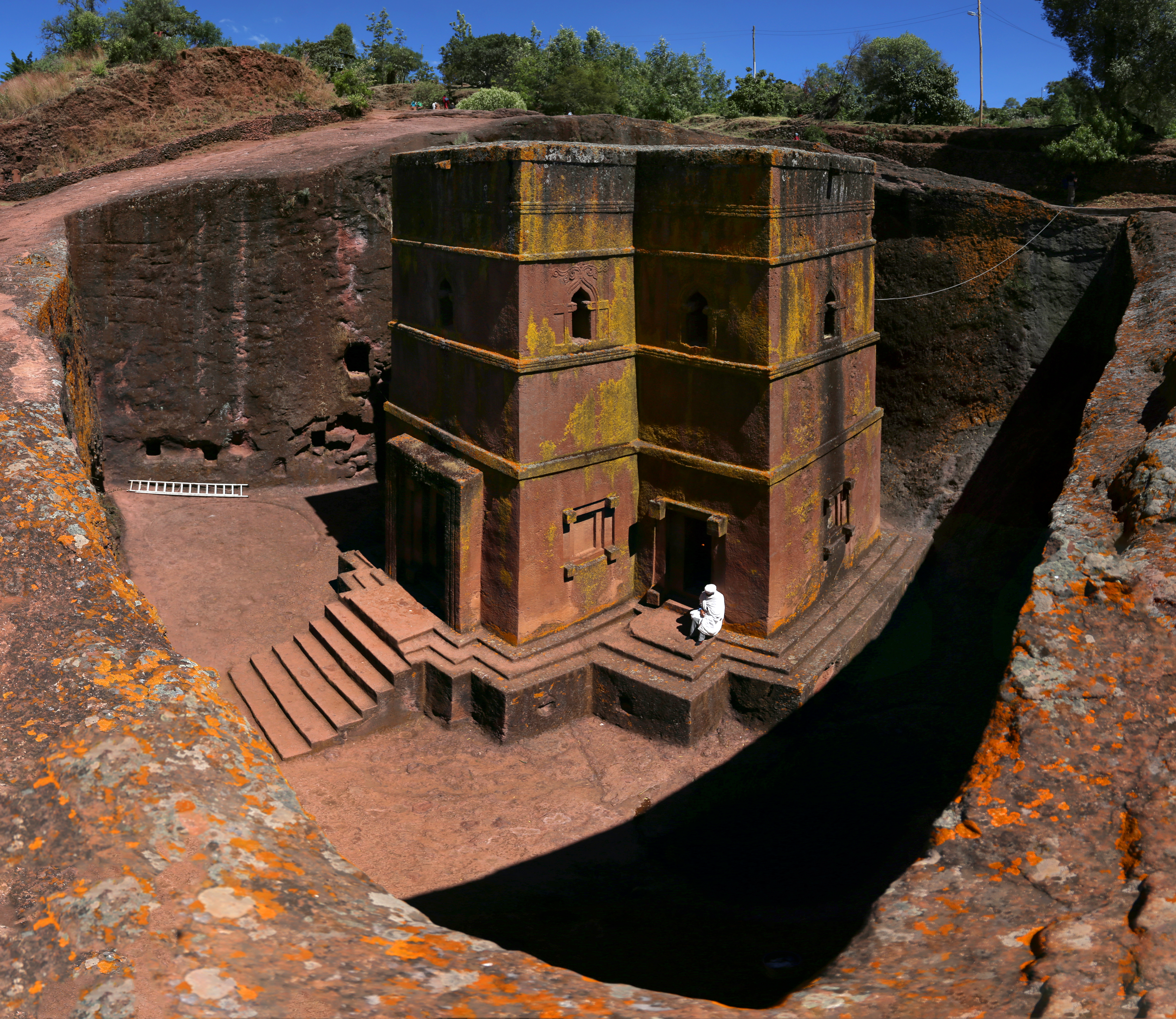
St. George's Church in Lalibela was the site of this leg's Roadblock.

- Episode 9: "Are There Instructions on Donkey Handling?" (January 18, 2005)
- Prize: A vacation to Mexico (awarded to Hayden and Aaron)
- Eliminated: Jonathan and Victoria

Locations

- L'Île-Rousse (La Pietra)
- Calvi → Nice
- Nice (City Garden – Statue of Albert I)
- Nice → Addis Ababa, Ethiopia
- Addis Ababa (Addis Ababa Bole International Airport) → Lalibela (Lalibela Airport)
- North Wollo (Lewz Village)
- Lalibela (St. George's Church)
- Lalibela (Lookout)

Episode summary

- At the start of this leg, teams were instructed to travel by ferry to Nice, and then travel to the city gardens, where they found their next clue at a bust of Albert I. Teams were instructed to fly to Addis Ababa, Ethiopia. Once there, teams had to sign up for one of two charter flights to Lalibela. There, teams found their next clue on vans outside the airport. Teams directed their drivers to take them to the overlook of Lewz Village.
- This leg's Detour was a choice between Raise the Roof or Mud the Hut. In Raise the Roof, teams assisted a group of locals by carrying a roof 2/3 mile (1,100 m) and then placing it on top of a house. Once the roof was on, one team member had to place a jug on the roof to receive their next clue. In Mud the Hut, teams had to use a plaster made of dirt, water, and straw to cover an entire wall of a traditional Ethiopian house to receive their next clue.
- After the Detour, teams had to take two donkeys and deliver them to a farmer three miles (4.8 km) away to receive their next clue.
- In this leg's Roadblock, one team member had to enter the Church of Saint George, where they received a pendant from the head priest. They then had to search among hundreds of worshipers outside of the church for the one wearing the same pendant. They could trade the pendant for their next clue, which directed them to the nearby Pit Stop.

Additional note

- Adam and Rebecca chose to use the Yield on Freddy and Kendra.

=== Leg 9 (Ethiopia → Sri Lanka) ===
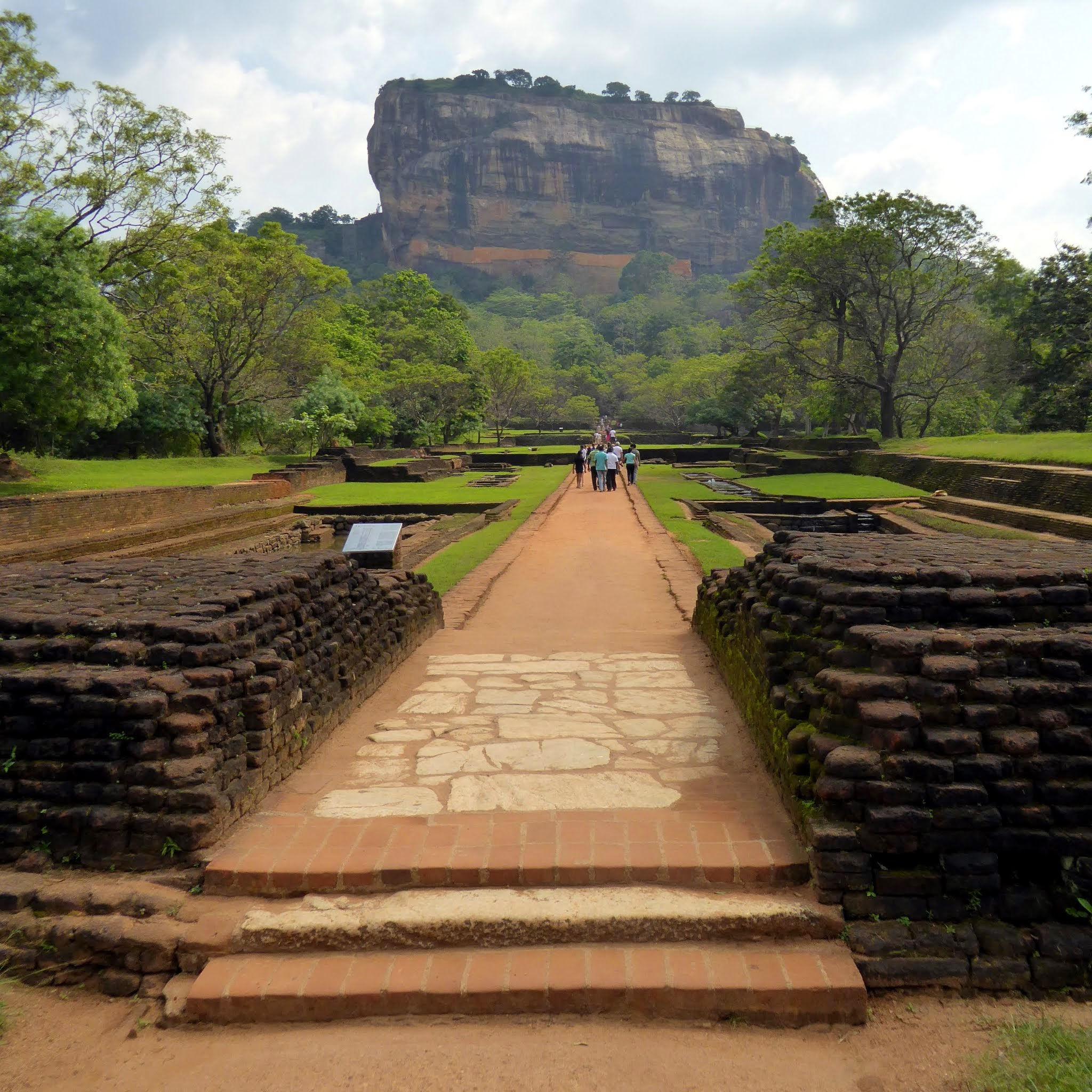
The Roadblock in Sri Lanka required one team member to climb the Lion Rock of Sigiriya and look for the Pit Stop.

- Episode 10: "It Always Comes Down to Details" (January 25, 2005)
- Prize: A vacation to Europe (awarded to Kris and Jon)
- Eliminated: Lori and Bolo

Locations

- Lalibela (Lookout)
- Lalibela → Addis Ababa
- Addis Ababa (Addis Ababa Stadium)
- Addis Ababa → Colombo, Sri Lanka
- Colombo → Galle
- Galle (Fort Galle)
- Galle (Coconut Plantation or Mahinda College Cricket Field)
- Galle → Kandy
- Kandy (Kandyan Art Association & Temple of the Tooth)
- Kandy → Dambulla
- Sigiriya (Lion Rock)
- Sigiriya (Hotel Sigiriya)

Episode summary

- At the start of this leg, teams returned to Lalibela Airport and signed up for one of two charter flights back to Addis Ababa. Once there, teams had to travel to the Addis Ababa Stadium, where they completed a four-man track relay with two local runners before receiving their next clue, which instructed them to fly to Colombo, Sri Lanka. Once there, teams had to travel by train to Galle and find their next clue at Fort Galle.
- This leg's Detour was a choice between Tree Trunks or Elephant Trunks. In Tree Trunks, teams traveled by tuk-tuk to a coconut plantation. There, each person had to climb to the top of a 50-foot (15 m) tree and retrieve a jug filled with tree sap, which they had to pour into a container to receive their next clue. In Elephant Trunks, teams traveled by tuk-tuk to an elephant polo field, where each team member had to ride an elephant down the length of the field, hitting a polo ball around a large pole and scoring a goal to receive their next clue.
- After the Detour, teams had to travel by bus to Kandy and then find the Kandyan Art Association, where they had to purchase an offering, which they could exchange at the nearby Temple of the Tooth for their next clue. Teams were instructed to travel by bus to Dambulla and then travel to Lion Rock in Sigiriya.
- In this leg's Roadblock, one team member had to ascend more than 1,000 steps to the top of Lion Rock. Once at the top, they had to use a pair of binoculars to look through the jungle for a flag near the pool at the Hotel Sigiriya. Once they located the hotel, teams had to proceed there and swim the length of the pool before checking in at the Pit Stop.

=== Leg 10 (Sri Lanka → China) ===
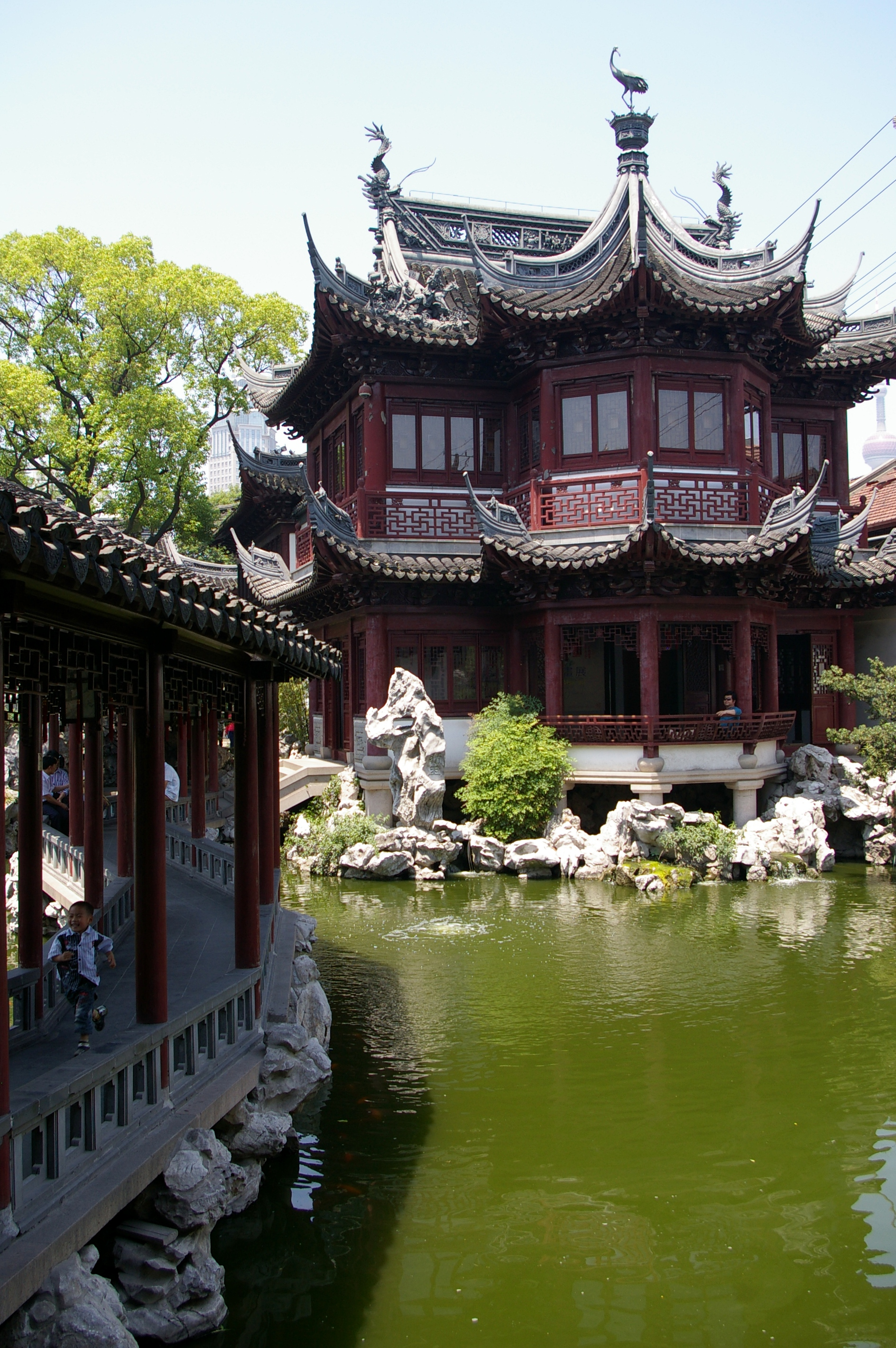
After arriving in Shanghai, teams traveled to Yuyuan Gardens and searched for their next clue.

- Episode 11: "You Deal with This Before I Hyperventilate" (February 1, 2005)
- Prize: A vacation to Hawaii (awarded to Hayden and Aaron)

Locations

- Sigiriya (Hotel Sigiriya)
- Colombo → Shanghai, China
- Shanghai (Yuyuan Garden)
- Shanghai (Huaneng Union Tower)
- Shanghai (HuaXia Bank Tower)
- Shanghai (The Bund – Monument to the People's Heroes)
- Shanghai (Jiangpu Road)
- Shanghai (Peace Hotel South)

Episode summary

- At the start of this leg, teams were instructed to fly to Shanghai, China. Once there, teams had to search the grounds of Yuyuan Garden for their next clue. Teams were then directed to the Huaneng Union Tower, where they found their next clue.
- In this leg's Roadblock, one team member had to wash a window on the exterior of the HuaXia Bank Tower until they revealed a hidden message. Once they could read the message, they had to lower themselves to the ground and repeat the message to the supervisor, who then handed them their next clue.
- At the Monument to the People's Heroes at The Bund, teams had to find a group of tai chi performers and search for one of four masters, who had their next clue.
- This leg's Detour was a choice between Bricks or Ice. In Bricks, teams had to use a traditional device to transport 300 clay bricks off a barge while balancing on a narrow wooden plank. From there, they had to stack the bricks on a wooden pallet to receive their clue. In Ice, teams would have had to load two blocks of ice onto the back of flatbed tricycles and deliver them to a fish market four blocks away. Once there, they would have had to break them into smaller pieces and place them into a tub to receive their next clue. All teams chose Bricks.
- After the Detour, teams had to check in at the Pit Stop: the Peace Hotel South.

Additional notes

- Freddy and Kendra chose to use the Yield on Adam and Rebecca.
- This was a non-elimination leg.

=== Leg 11 (China) ===
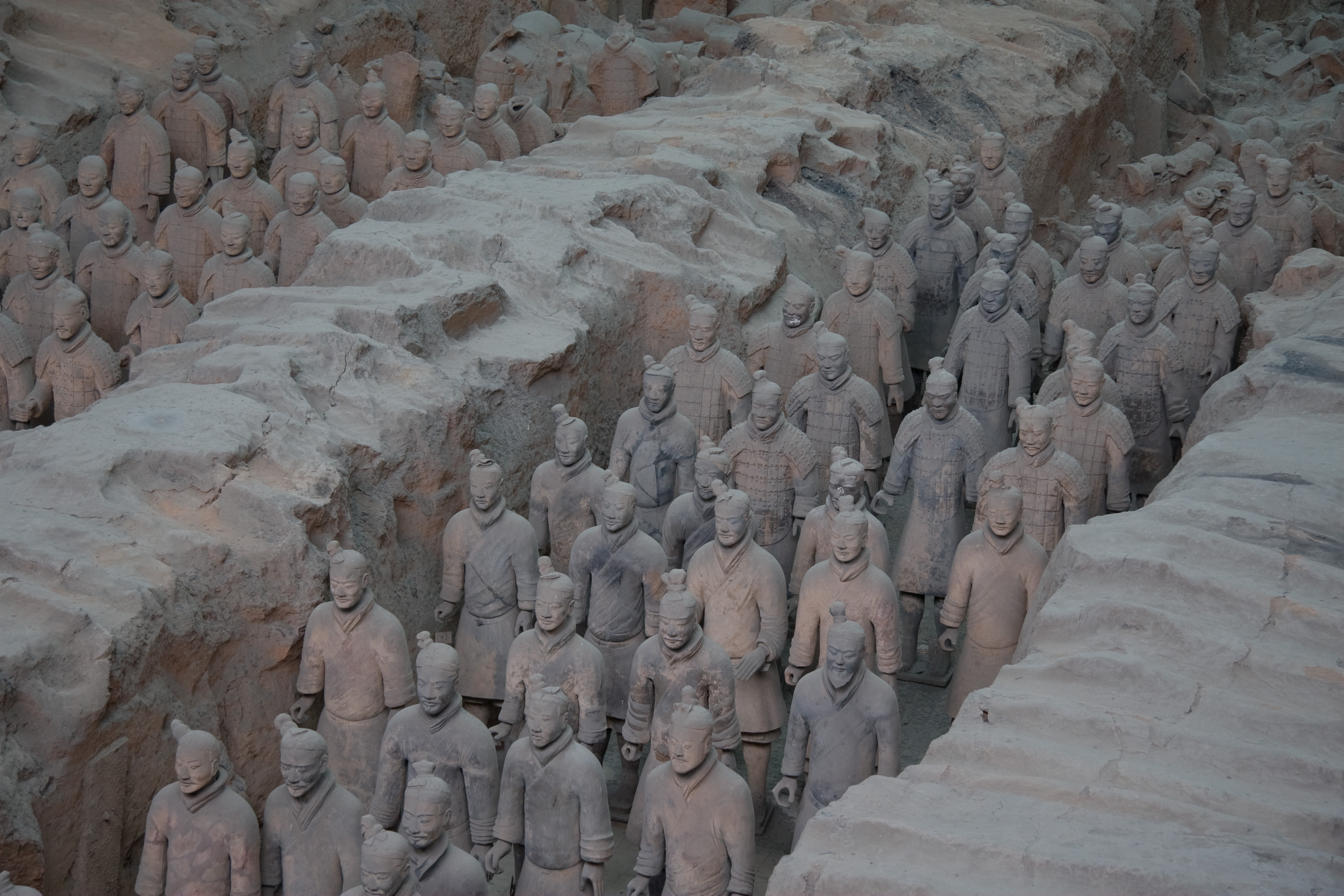
Teams visited the Terracotta Army in Xi'an on this leg.

- Episode 12: "4 Continents, 24 Cities, 40,000 Miles" (February 8, 2005)
- Prize: A vacation to the Caribbean (awarded to Kris & Jon)
- Eliminated: Hayden & Aaron

Locations

- Shanghai (Peace Hotel South)
- Shanghai → Xi'an
- Xi'an (Drum Tower)
- Xi'an (BYD Auto Factory)
- Xi'an (Mausoleum of the First Qin Emperor – Terracotta Army)
- Huayin (Mount Hua – North Peak)
- Xi'an (Xi'an City Wall)

Episode summary

- At the start of this leg, teams were instructed to travel by train to Xi'an and then find their next clue at the Drum Tower.
- This leg's Detour was a choice between Spray or Scroll. In Spray, teams traveled to a car factory and spray painted the shell of a Chinese-made car to receive their next clue. In Scroll, teams would have had to travel to Xi'an Tang Du Factory and search through ten bolts of fabric with a light table to find the two Chinese characters stamped within. All teams chose Spray.
- After the Detour, teams were instructed to travel to the Mausoleum of the First Qin Emperor, where they had to find the viewing platform of the Terracotta Army to locate their next clue. Teams were directed to the base of Mount Hua, where they had to travel by shuttle bus and gondola to the North Peak.
- In this leg's Roadblock, one team member had to search among 3,000 padlocks for the one that they could unlock using a provided key to receive their next clue, which directed them to the Pit Stop: the South Gate of the Xi'an City Wall.

=== Leg 12 (China → United States) ===
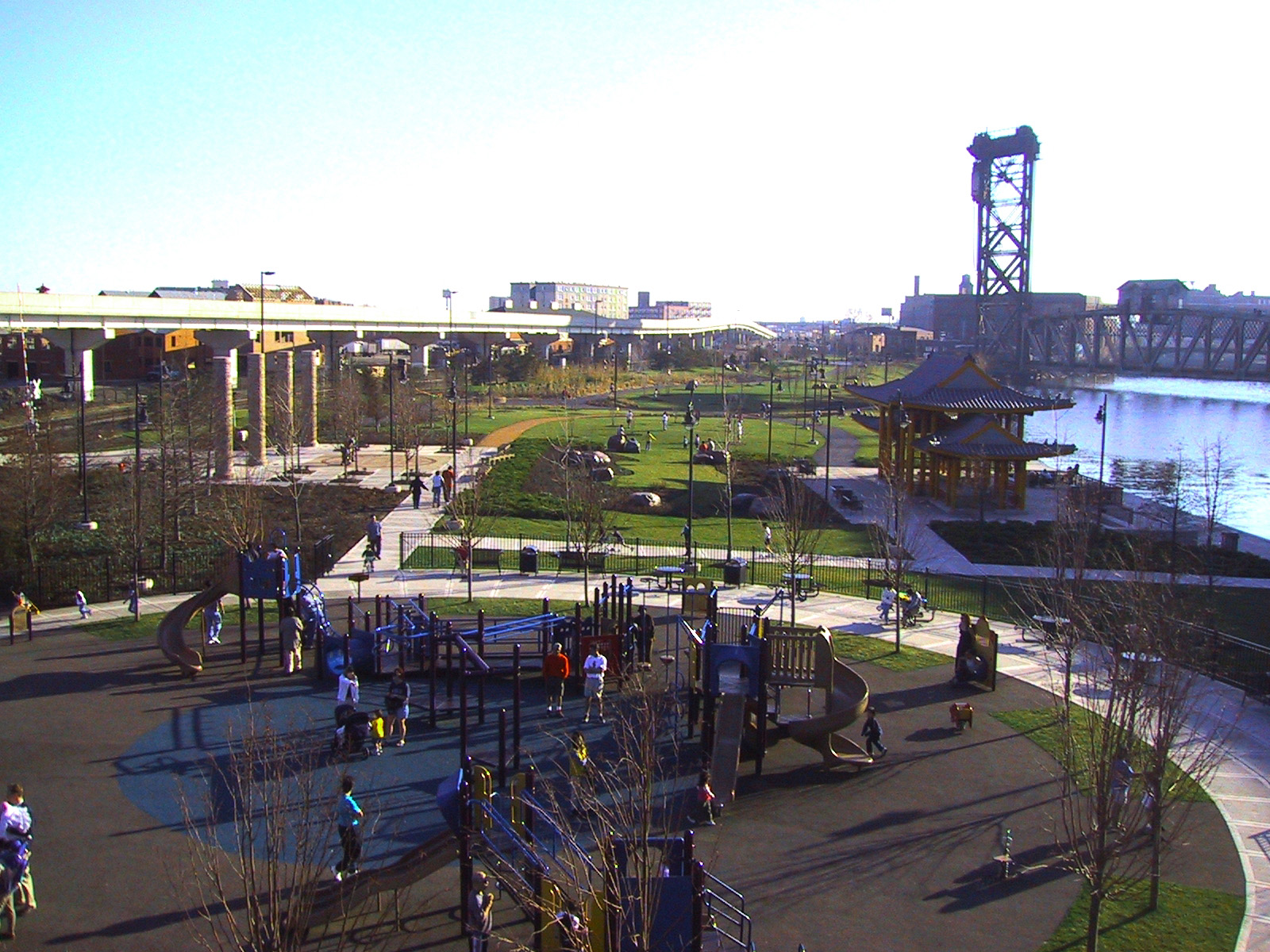
Ping Tom Memorial Park in Chicago was the finish line of The Amazing Race 6.

- Episode 12: "4 Continents, 24 Cities, 40,000 Miles" (February 8, 2005)
- Prize: US$1,000,000
- Winners: Freddy and Kendra
- Runners-up: Kris and Jon
- Third place: Adam and Rebecca

Locations

- Xi'an (Xi'an City Wall)
- Xi'an → Honolulu, Hawaii
- Honolulu (Puu Ualakaa State Park)
- Honolulu (Hilo Hattie or Lōkahi Canoe Club)
- Honolulu (Honolulu International Airport – Kamaka Air Hangar)
- Honolulu (Kaneohe Bay)
- Honolulu → Chicago, Illinois
- Chicago (Chicago Water Tower)
- Chicago (Gino's East)
- Chicago (Ping Tom Memorial Park)

Episode summary

- At the start of this leg, teams were instructed to fly to Honolulu, Hawaii. Once there, teams drove themselves to Puu Ualakaa State Park, where they found their next clue.
- This season's final Detour was a choice between Outfits or Outriggers. In Outfits, teams had to drive to a tropical clothing distributor and search through racks filled with Aloha shirts for the match to one displayed on a mannequin to receive their next clue. In Outriggers, teams had to drive to a canoe club and, with the help of a provided assistant, paddle an outrigger canoe down a two-mile (3.2 km) course to receive their next clue.
- After the Detour, teams had to drive to Kamaka Air to find their next clue.
- In this season's final Roadblock, one team member had to tandem skydive with an instructor and land on a sandbar in Kaneohe Bay, where they retrieved their next clue.
- After the Roadblock, teams were instructed to fly to Chicago, Illinois. Once there, teams had to travel by train to the Chicago Water Tower to find their next clue. They were directed to Gino's East pizzeria, where each team member had to eat two slices of deep-dish pizza to receive their final clue, which directed them to the finish line: Ping Tom Memorial Park.

Additional notes

- Legs 11 and 12 aired back-to-back as a special two-hour episode.
- When Kris and Jon arrived at the park at the end of the leg, they were blocked by a moving train from continuing to the finish line. Jon estimated that the delay caused by the train lasted about ten minutes. Meanwhile, Freddy and Kendra were able to cross the finish line on the other side of the train.

== Reception ==
=== Critical response ===
At the time it aired, The Amazing Race 6 received negative reviews. Linda Holmes of Television Without Pity called this season disappointing. Scott Pierce of Deseret News said that his immediate reaction after the season finished was, "I'm never going to watch this show again." Reece Forward of Screen Rant ranked this season as the show's second-worst, writing that it was "actively unlikable at points," but the season "escapes the bottom slot due to at least having a few teams that are likable or interesting". Since its airing, this season was ranked ninth out of the first 27 seasons by the Rob Has a Podcast Amazing Race correspondents in 2016. In 2021, Val Barone of TheThings ranked this season as the show's fourth-best season. In 2022, Rhenn Taguiam of Game Rant ranked this season as the seventh-best season. In 2024, Taguiam's ranking was updated with this season ranked 12th out of 36.

=== Instances of racial remarks and physical violence ===
In Dakar, Senegal, Kendra Bentley, who had previously decried being in "ghetto Africa", complained, "This city is wretched and disgusting. And they just keep breeding and breeding in this poverty. I can't take it." These comments were largely denounced as racist due to the equation of people in Africa as animals. Bentley later claimed that her comments were taken out of context, saying, "I was actually talking about the government and how they put people in these situations. They don't give them opportunities for education or birth control." Lesser outrage was also directed at Rebecca Cardon for similar insensitive comments. On the way to the House of Slaves on Gorée Island, Cardon commented, "I'd love to get out of Africa. I can see why so many people escaped." Kevin McDonough of The Spokesman-Review wrote, "Now that's a novel way to look at the Middle Passage."

Later in the episode, Jonathan Baker shoved his wife, Victoria Fuller, who had picked up his bag, which he had dropped during a footrace to the Pit Stop at the Brandenburg Gate in Berlin. He was modestly rebuked by Phil Keoghan, who had seen Jonathan berating his wife, but had not witnessed the shove. In response, critics and fans decried seeing possible domestic violence on television. Baker later stated that the "shove in Berlin was wrong. It was wrong and I should not have done it. I can't apologize any more because I really felt that it hurt."

== Works cited ==
- Castro, Adam-Troy (2006). My Ox Is Broken!. BenBella Books. ISBN 978-1-932100-91-4.
