= The Real World: Chicago =

Coordinates: 41°54′38″N 87°40′35″W

- Season 11
- The cast of The Real World: Chicago
- Starring: Keri Evans; Kyle Brandt; Aneesa Ferreira; Tonya Cooley; Chris Beckman; Cara Kahn; Theo Gantt III
- No. of episodes: 24

Release
- Original network: MTV
- Original release: January 15 – July 9, 2002

Season chronology
- ← Previous; The Real World: Back to New York Next → The Real World: Las Vegas

The Real World: Chicago is the eleventh season of MTV's reality television series The Real World, which focuses on a group of diverse strangers living together for several months in a different city each season, as cameras follow their lives and interpersonal relationships. It is the first season of The Real World to be filmed in the East North Central States region of the United States, specifically in Illinois.

The season featured seven people who lived in a converted bookstore/coffeehouse in the Chicago's Wicker Park neighborhood, which production started from June 28 until November 3, 2001. This was also the first season in which production would start months (sometimes weeks) after wrapping the previous season allowing filming and broadcasting almost immediately unlike the usual annual season. The season premiered on January 15, 2002, and consisted of 24 episodes. This was the first of two seasons to be filmed in Chicago. Twelve years later, the show returned to the city in its thirtieth season.

The season depicted cast members dealing with learning of the September 11th attacks, although criticism was leveled at the series because the cast was actually at Wrigley Field for a photo shoot when they first learned of the event. However, contrary to rumors, the reactions seen were not staged. Producers brought a television in to the loft so the cast could see the attack footage.

Amateur footage of Ed Marszewski protesting at the location during the production in 2001. Chalk slogans read: "I'm not an actor in my neighborhood"

Bunim-Murray Productions experienced a number of problems with the production of this season, including a nearby shooting, and numerous protests, vandalism, and arrests by locals critical of MTV and its parent company, Viacom, and opposed to the production's perceived contribution to the neighborhood's gentrification.

== Season changes ==
This was the first season of The Real World to feature two openly gay cast members, Chris Beckman and Aneesa Ferreira. A previous season, The Real World: Hawaii, featured two LGBT cast members: Justin Deabler, who is gay, and Ruthie Alcaide, who is bisexual. Ferreira later identified as bisexual in future television shows.

== Assignment ==
Almost every season of The Real World, beginning with its fifth season, has included the assignment of a season-long group job or task to the housemates, continued participation in which has been mandatory to remain part of the cast since the Back to New York season. The Chicago roommates were assigned to three different jobs at the Chicago Park District. Some were lifeguards at the Lake Michigan beaches while others worked with inner-city children on a park mural. The cast then worked on "Chicagoween" (a portmanteau of "Chicago" and "Halloween") and had to devise a story to act out for the children at Chicago's Halloween celebration.

== The residence ==
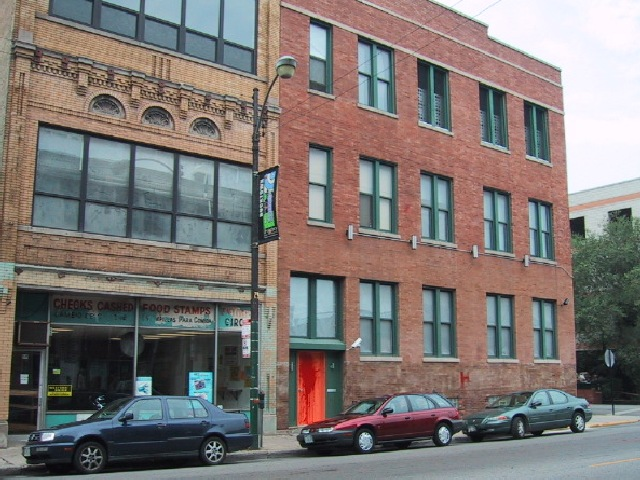
The season residence on July 16, 2001, note the vandalism (red paint on the door) and street-level brick that has been worn due to graffiti and its continued removal. The red paint was visible in the show, but the protests were not.

The cast resided in a loft at 1934 West North Avenue in the Chicago neighborhood of Wicker Park, which had formerly served as a sweatshop, storage facility, and after falling into disrepair, a drug den in the 1980s. In the late 1990s, it served as the space for Steven Ivcich Acting Studio where Johnny Kastl studied before moving to Los Angeles. After it was renovated, it served as Urbis Orbis Café, a classic hipster hangout, then an antique shop. Chicago Scenic Studios constructed the loft's interior, and interior decorating was overseen by local designer Suhail. After filming, fixtures and other items used during the production were auctioned off, and the space was converted into a Cheetah Gym, which opened in 2002.

== Cast ==
Cast member	Age^{1}	Hometown
Keri Evans	22	New Orleans, Louisiana
An outgoing and charismatic young woman, much of Keri's activities depicted over the season involve her tumultuous relationship with Kyle, whose is torn between his attraction to Keri and his on-off relationship New York City girlfriend Nicole, who is in New York City. Keri becomes homesick at one point, and claims not to like the men of Chicago. She remains in the house, though, and does end up flirting with guys at a local bar with Cara as she gets over Kyle. Keri shares a room with Kyle and Chris.
Kyle Brandt	23	Lincolnshire, Illinois
Kyle has just graduated from Princeton University. Although he first was on track for a football career, he got involved in theater. Kyle dreams of acting and being in the spotlight. His "will they or won't they" relationship with Keri takes up most of his screen time in the Chicago season, though their romance inevitably does not work out. After the events of the September 11 attacks, he realized how important his ex-girlfriend Nicole, who was in New York City at the time, still is to him.
Aneesa Ferreira	20	Narberth, Pennsylvania
Aneesa comes from an interracial relationship - her mother is Jewish-American, and her father is black. Aneesa is a very liberal lesbian who does not mind walking around nude, or even showering with a male roommate, much to the dislike of small-town girl Tonya. She has a quick temper but also is very funny and caring. Throughout the season, Aneesa clashes frequently with Tonya, and argues with her mother by phone frequently, mainly because of her mother's lack of acceptance of her sexual orientation. She enters a brief relationship with a woman named Veronica, but Veronica's history with her ex gets in the way of getting close to Aneesa. Aneesa then finds romance with Danielle, who, while often overbearing and bossy, allowed Aneesa happiness during her months in Chicago. In the house, Aneesa shares a room with Theo.
Tonya Cooley	21	Walla Walla, Washington
Tonya was a foster child, going from home to home from a young age until she moved out on her own at age 17, and has lived a sheltered life. She is very taken aback by Aneesa's openness about nudity and is often offended by it. She also appears homophobic when Chris comes out to the other roommates, telling the camera, "I think the gay lifestyle is full of drugs and a lot of sin!" But as the season progresses she appears to open her mind up and discard her past prejudices. She also claims to be afraid of Theo and men in general. Tonya suffers from kidney problems from medical problems that were never addressed when she was younger. She experiences problems with her condition while in Chicago and is admitted to the hospital several times. Tonya is very attached to her boyfriend Justin back home, and spends much of her time in the house talking on the phone with him. The other roommates accused her of being a drama queen. Tonya shares a room with Cara.
Chris Beckman	24	Brockton, Massachusetts
Chris is an openly gay artist who has struggled in the past with alcoholism, but takes up a job as a bartender during the show, much to the bewilderment of Kyle, who wonders what this does to Chris's recovery. Chris maintains his body by working out a lot, but some of the roommates see his exercise to be on the obsessive side - and maybe compensating for something else. While in Chicago, Chris enters a relationship with a man named Kurt, with whom he seems compatible. However, Chris ends the romance because he wants to focus on his recovery instead of a serious relationship. Chris's relationships with men do make the other male roommates a bit uncomfortable. Chris also does modeling during the season, and asks Kyle to join him. Chris shares a room with Kyle and Keri.
Cara Kahn	22	Boston, Massachusetts
Cara is from the suburbs of Boston, Massachusetts. She comes from upper-middle-class Jewish parents, including a professor-doctor father who valued academics, though Cara often felt she did not live up to that standard, as her brother did. She is a student at Washington University in St. Louis. MTV describes her as humorous, generous, and "intensely creative". Cara has spent most of her adult life in relationships making her move to Chicago as a single woman the beginning of a new phase in her life.
Theo Gantt III	19	Riverside, California
Theo is a devout and slightly sheltered pastor's son from California who socializes with women a lot. He is attracted to Aneesa upon first arriving in Chicago, but she is not attracted to men, and they form a brother-sister bond instead. Theo clashes frequently with Tonya, but is always quick to apologize. Theo is seen as a lovable naive party boy who has a good heart. Although he disapproves of Aneesa's and Chris's sexual orientation, he is still good friends with both of them. Theo shares a room with Aneesa.

^Note 1: Age at the time of filming.

== Episodes ==
No. overall	No. in season	Title	Original release date
211	1	"Welcome To Chicago"	January 15, 2002
The housemates arrive in Chicago, where they move into a former warehouse in the arty Wicker Park district. Theo is attracted to Anessa, but is shocked when she admits to being a lesbian. Chris reveals that he is a painter and a recovering alcoholic, but chooses not to disclose that he is gay.
212	2	"Brothers And Sisters"	January 15, 2002
The roommates begin wondering what Chris' secret is and figure out that he's gay. Theo reveals his disgust with gay men, but enjoys dealing with his roommate, Aneesa. Upset by him, Aneesa develops an interesting way of showing her unhappiness.
213	3	"Summer Summer Summertime"	January 22, 2002
Cara enjoys her newfound single status while coping with the emotional spillover from her former relationship. Chris struggles with coming out to his roommates.
214	4	"Bonding Session"	January 29, 2002
The housemates learn that they may be working as lifeguards at a Chicago beach, but first they must take a training course and pass a swimming test. Also, Tonya, suffering from health problems, contemplates heading home to see her doctor.
215	5	"K likes K"	February 5, 2002
Keri and Kyle's relationship turns sour when he becomes stand-offish during a visit from his friends. Meanwhile, an ailing Tonya arrives back in Walla Walla, and reunites with her boyfriend, Justin.
216	6	"Animal House"	February 12, 2002
Kyle and Keri argue about how he treats her when they're with his friends; Theo brings home several girls for a party and one of them throws up in the shower stall, angering his housemates.
217	7	"Off To Work"	February 19, 2002
While Kyle, Keri and Chris begin their first day on the job as lifeguards, the others find out that they will be helping kids paint a mural in a neighborhood park. Also, Chris invites the roomies to a dinner supporting gay rights, but Theo refuses to attend.
218	8	"The Screaming Match"	March 5, 2002
Sparks fly when Aneesa is drawn to an attractive young woman, Veronica, whom she meets at the Red Dog. Although most of her roommates like her new girlfriend, Theo and Chris have reservations. The non-lifeguards meet the kids who will be painting the mural with them.
219	9	"Knowing a Thing Or Two"	March 12, 2002
Cara's father visits and takes everyone to dinner. Also, Cara is intrigued by Kyle's friend Djordje; and Aneesa and Veronica reconcile and go out for a night on the town.
220	10	"Romantic Retreat"	March 19, 2002
Tonya's kidney problems resurface, causing Cara to rush her to the hospital from work. Also, Tonya's boyfriend visits; Kyle plans a weekend getaway to his father's lakeside cabin for himself and his housemates; and Kyle's girlfriend, Nicole, suggests that they break up.
221	11	"Taking The Next Step"	March 26, 2002
The housemates, Tonya's boyfriend Justin and Chris's boyfriend Kurt spend a weekend at Kyle's family's summer house. Also, Chris takes a part-time job tending bar and Keri has issues with Kyle's indecisiveness.
222	12	"Kid Craziness"	April 2, 2002
A homesick Keri returns to New Orleans for a friend's wedding. Theo takes an interest in one of the kids helping paint a mural at the park. Kyle and Cara head out for a night on the town.
223	13	"The Boyfriend From Hell"	April 9, 2002
Tonya asks Aneesa to be more modest; an ex-boyfriend of Cara's visits; and an ill-timed gesture from Chris sheds light on Cara's issues with her self-image.
224	14	"Roomie Tensions"	April 23, 2002
Aneesa angers her roommates by refusing to do her fair share of the house chores. Tonya passes another kidney stone and has to return to the hospital.
225	15	"The Gang Gets Their New Job"	April 30, 2002
The housemates wrap up their jobs with Summer Parks Programming, with Kyle, Keri and Chris leaving their work as lifeguards and the others finishing their work on the mural with a presentation to the kids' parents. Kyle attends an AA meeting with Chris; and the gang learns that they're slated to be storytellers for a Halloween event, which upsets Theo, who sees it as the "devil's holiday".
226	16	"The Day that Changed Everything"	May 7, 2002
On September 11, the cast reacts to the events in New York City, with Kyle attempting to contact Nicole and his sister, both of whom live near the World Trade Center. Aneesa celebrates her birthday and butts heads with Tonya, who continues to hog the phone.
227	17	"Changes"	May 21, 2002
Kyle decides he wants to reenergize his relationship with Nicole, but first he must redefine his relationship with Keri. When he asks her to give him some space, she doesn't respond well. Aneesa loses the keys for the minivan.
228	18	"Getting Closure"	May 28, 2002
Cara and most of her housemates travel to St. Louis, where they visit with Cara's family and her ex-boyfriend, Jared. Meanwhile, Tonya stays behind in Chicago, where she enjoys being alone in the loft.
229	19	"Heading To New England"	June 4, 2002
Tonya's boyfriend visits and has words with Theo about how Theo treats Tonya. Some of the housemates travel to Boston, where they attend a '70s theme party thrown by some of Chris's friends.
230	20	"Spooky Real World"	June 11, 2002
The housemates return to Chicago from Boston and are soon at loggerheads with Tonya, who confronts Cara because she believes Cara betrayed her by telling the others of her breast-augmentation surgery.
231	21	"The Skits"	June 18, 2002
Keri feels pressure to finish writing her play, which is one of three the housemates are supposed to perform for Halloween. Cara, who doesn't like Keri's play, tries to get out of performing it by creating a sob story about Tonya, for which Tonya calls her on. Keri is disturbed by Cara's newfound alliance with Kyle.
232	22	"Aneesa's Love Triangle"	June 25, 2002
Aneesa runs into trouble when both of her girlfriends show up at the same club on the same night. Tonya undergoes surgery to remove her kidney stones.
233	23	"Halloween Madness"	July 2, 2002
Kyle's younger brother visits, leading Tonya and Keri to question why. Kyle takes part in a fashion show; and Keri and Kyle have a major argument in which she accuses him of being fake.
234	24	"Moving Out"	July 9, 2002
While the rest of the gang starts to get sentimental about leaving the loft and Chicago, Tonya is excited to go. Cara and her friend Matt perform at a coffee shop, but Tonya and Chris decide to work out rather than attend.

== After filming ==
After the cast left the Real World loft, all seven of them appeared to discuss their experiences both during and since their time on the show, Stop Being Polite: The Real World Chicago Reunion, which premiered on July 15, 2002, and was hosted by television personality Brian McFayden.

At the 2008 The Real World Awards Bash, Chris received a nomination in the "Hottest Male" category, while Cara received one for "Biggest Playa".

After the show, Kyle Brandt starred as Phillip Kiriakis on Days of Our Lives on NBC. In 2008, he wrote and produced the TV series Rome is Burning and The Jim Rome Show, a sports radio talk show out of California, on which he appeared as "Lyle Grant".

Tonya Cooley went to pose for Playboy and appear in productions on Cinemax. She appeared on multiple Challenges before leaving the show's unstable environment, quit drinking due to alcoholism, and returned to Washington to live a regular life and own a salon.

In 2017, Aneesa Ferreira appeared on MTV's Fear Factor, where she was paired with Laurel Stucky from The Challenge: Fresh Meat II. In 2020, Ferreira started hosting the MTV's Official Challenge podcast, alongside fellow castmate Tori Deal from Are You the One?.

=== The Challenge ===
Cast member	Seasons of The Challenge	Other appearances
Keri Evans	—N/a	—N/a
Kyle Brandt	—N/a	—N/a
Aneesa Ferreira	Battle of the Sexes, Battle of the Sexes 2, The Gauntlet 2, The Duel, The Inferno 3, The Duel II, Rivals, Battle of the Exes, Rivals II, Free Agents, Battle of the Bloodlines, XXX: Dirty 30, Total Madness, Double Agents, Spies, Lies & Allies, Ride or Dies, Battle of the Eras, Vets & New Threats	The Challenge: Champs vs. Stars (season 1), The Challenge: Champs vs. Stars (season 2), The Challenge: All Stars (season 1), The Challenge: All Stars (season 5)
Tonya Cooley	Battle of the Sexes, The Gauntlet, Battle of the Sexes 2, The Inferno II, Fresh Meat, The Inferno 3, The Island, The Ruins	—N/a
Chris Beckman	—N/a	—N/a
Cara Kahn	—N/a	—N/a
Theo Gantt III	Battle of the Sexes, The Gauntlet	—N/a

Note: Aneesa made an appearance on Vendettas for an elimination
