= Gabriel Romero =

Gabriel Romero may refer to:

- Gabriel Romero (actor), Mexican actor
- Gabriel Romero (footballer), Argentine midfielder
