= Chico's Angels =

- Title characters of Chico's Angels (from l. to r.): Quintero as Kay Sedia, Garcia as Chita Parol, and Casillas as Frieda Laye.

Comedy career
- Years active: 2003–present
- Genres: Comedy, drag queen, LGBT
- Subject: Parody
- Website: www.chicosangels.com

Chico's Angels is a live comedy production in Los Angeles which parodies the 1976–1981 television series Charlie's Angels. Starring three drag queens in the title roles, the show has been performed regularly at the Cavern Club Theatre in Silver Lake since July 25, 2003. It was co-created by Oscar Quintero, who performs as one of the leads, and Kurt Koehler, who also directs the show.

== Overview ==
Like Charlie's Angels, the show focuses on three female private detectives who investigate crimes on assignment from their mysterious boss, whom they have never seen in person. In Chico's Angels, the ladies are brassy, gaudily dressed Mexican women who often insult and argue with each other. BroadwayWorld.com described it as "a Latino drag queen/Three Stooges version of the 70s series", and Siran Babayan wrote in LA Weekly, "It’s like an Agatha Christie novel, only with drag queens." TMZ said, "Imagine if the Angels were a bit more masculine, a whole lot trampier and spoke English as a second language." Bill Raden wrote for LA Weekly, "this trio of blowsy, somewhat earthier angels comes with cha-cha heels on their gumshoes, a decidedly bitchy attitude and a virtue that can be summed up in one word—cheap".

== Cast ==
- Oscar Quintero as Kay Sedia, the self-absorbed and curvaceous former Miss Tijuana Natural Springs Water
- Ray Garcia as Chita Parol, the smart and assertive Angel who has both a personal and professional rivalry with Kay
- Danny Casillas as Frieda Laye, the most promiscuous and least intelligent Angel
- Alejandro Patiño as Bossman, the Angels' handler who joins them in their investigations (the show's equivalent of David Doyle's "Bosley" in the original series)
- Mr. Dan as the voice of Ricardo "Chico" Torrez, the Angels' employer (the show's "Charlie")

In 2011, Jai Rodriguez of Queer Eye briefly portrayed Chita in "Love Boat Chicas" for a week of LA performances and two weeks in San Diego. Charo, who is parodied in that "episode", watched one of these LA performances and, according to Rodriguez, "loved it". Daniel Edward Mora portrayed Bossman for an October 2015 run of "Chicas in Chains", as well as the August/September 2016 initial run of the fifth episode, "Waikiki Chicas".

The rotating cast of guest stars in supporting roles has included Koehler, Shelley Hennig, Natalie Lander, Cher Ferreyra, Beth Leckbee, and Duke Shoman. Eden Espinosa and Steven Hill have appeared in webisodes.

== Episodes ==
Between 2003 and 2016, four individual shows (called "episodes") were produced, and performed individually in rotation. A fifth episode called "Chico’s Angels Five-0: Waikiki Chicas" debuted in August 2016.

No.	Title	Directed by	Written by
1	"Chico’s Angels: Pretty Chicas All in a Row"	Kurt Kohler	Oscar Quintero & Kurt Kohler
The Angels go undercover at the Miss Kumquat Pageant to discover who is murdering the contestants.
2	"Chico’s Angels 2: Love Boat Chicas"	Kurt Kohler	Oscar Quintero & Kurt Kohler
The Angels go undercover aboard the Love Boat to find out who is trying to kill performer Charo.
3	"Chico’s Angels 3: Chicas in Chains"	Kurt Kohler	Oscar Quintero & Kurt Kohler
Undercover at a prep school to investigate a string of hooker murders, the Angels find themselves in jail.
4	"Chico’s Angels 4: Chicas Are Forever"	Kurt Kohler	James Edward Quinn, Oscar Quintero & Kurt Kohler
The Angels are hired to locate and recover a priceless stolen diamond.
5	"Chico’s Angels Five-0: Waikiki Chicas"	Kurt Kohler	Oscar Quintero & Kurt Kohler
The Angels go undercover as hula dancers in Waikiki.

Webisodes

Three webisodes have also been produced and made available at YouTube.

1. "Gang of Chicas" - The Angels investigate the mystery of a missing lawn ornament. Guest star Eden Espinosa.
2. "Little Lost Chica" - Kay and Chita must find and rescue a kidnapped Frieda. Guest star Mike Pingel of Chasing Farrah.
3. "24ish" - The Angels are sent to defuse a bomb in this homage to 24. Guest star Steven Hill.

"24ish" has been shown across the United States in over twenty film festivals, and was nominated for best short at the Frameline Film Festival.

== Production ==
Chico's Angels was co-created by Oscar Quintero, who performs as one of the leads, and Kurt Koehler, who also directs the show. It has been performed regularly at the Cavern Club Theatre in Silver Lake, a neighborhood of Los Angeles, since July 25, 2003. The show has also been performed at the Onyx Theater in Las Vegas and the Diversionary Theater in San Diego, and in 2018 at The Colony Theater in Burbank, California.

The cast of Chico's Angels have appeared on The Real Housewives of Atlanta, KTLA Morning News, Fox 5 San Diego News, the radio shows of Sheena Metal and Frank DeCaro, The Baub Show, and in publications and websites such as Frontiers and Instinct. They have also hosted events including the Cybersocket Awards, San Diego Pride and Los Angeles Pride.

== Reception ==
Gil Kaan of BroadwayWorld.com called Chico's Angels "the best scripted comedy drag show in Los Angeles", and in 2013 Matthew Breen of Out noted that "For a full decade, Los Angeles’s Chico’s Angels have been a muy caliente comedy cult hit." TMZ noted that "The shows have become a local cult favorite and received rave reviews from L.A. critics." Amy Nicholson of LA Weekly called the show a "riotous comedy".
