= Trishelle Cannatella =

American television personality (born 1979)

- Born: November 4, 1979 (age 46)
- Occupations: Television personality, model, actress, poker player
- Years active: 2002–present
- Spouse: John Hensz (m. 2017)

Trishelle Cannatella (born November 4, 1979) is an American reality television personality, model, actress and poker player known for her appearances on the reality television series The Real World: Las Vegas, The Traitors, and The Challenge. She has also appeared on other reality shows such as The Surreal Life, Kill Reality, Punk'd, Fear Factor, and Below Deck Mediterranean. She has previously been a Playboy model and actress. She has also made appearances in TV ads and music videos, posed nude in Playboy magazine, appeared in the horror film The Scorned, and competed successfully in celebrity and non-celebrity poker tournaments.

== Career ==
=== The Real World and The Challenge ===
Cannatella heard a radio ad for a show called Lost in the U.S.A., which offered a $50,000 prize, and would be co-produced by Bunim-Murray Productions and air on The WB. The show was axed during the auditions, but she was invited to audition for Bunim-Murray's twelfth season of the long-running reality show The Real World, which was set in Las Vegas and would later air in 2002-2003. She accepted, but perceived the questions she was asked during the audition process to be part of an attempt by the producers to cast her as the stereotypical racist and homophobic southern cast member, and later, in light of the questions they asked about her religion, as the "holy roller". Cannatella was selected as a cast member. During her stay, she and her roommates worked in the hotel and clubs. Cannatella and her fellow castmates felt pressure from the producers to act out for the cameras in order to make appealing airtime, saying that she was asked leading questions by the producers about her plans on certain nights. She also notes that alcohol was made readily available to the cast, which she pointed out in light of the fact that alcoholism runs in her family.

During the season of Road Rules: Campus Crawl, which was filmed at the same time as The Real World: Las Vegas, the cast members from the two shows faced off against each other in a series of challenges.

In 2003, Cannatella was also a member of the Real World team during the Real World/Road Rules Challenge: The Gauntlet, but was sent home when she lost a gauntlet to Sarah Greyson. She also competed in the succeeding season, The Inferno, but was eliminated second. In May 2007, she appeared on the reunion show, Reunited: The Real World Las Vegas.

In 2012, Cannatella returned to the Challenge and competed with former Real World housemate, Alton Williams, The Real World: Las Vegas (2011) alums Dustin Zito and Nany González in The Challenge: Battle of the Seasons; she and Zito finished the season in second place after Williams and Gonzalez were eliminated earlier in the season.

The next year, Cannatella returned for another Challenge season titled Rivals II, where she was placed in a team with fellow contestant Sarah Rice from The Real World: Brooklyn, whom she had conflict with in Battle of the Seasons. In Episode 3, Cannatella quit the game after she got into an argument with Aneesa Ferreira, and became intolerant of the conditions in the house and production's treatment of an injury. Rice was sent home by default because she was left without a partner.

Cannatella was a cast member of the Paramount+ spin-off series The Challenge: All Stars, which premiered April 1, 2021. She was eliminated in the second episode.

=== Other television work ===
In 2005, Cannatella was a part of the reality show Kill Reality which chronicled the making of the movie The Scorned. She has also appeared in an episode of the reality show that pranks celebrities, Punk'd, hosted by Ashton Kutcher.

Cannatella appeared on Fear Factor in a special reality themed episode in 2006. Her partner was ex-boyfriend Mike Mizanin. The two competed against other teams of former reality contestants including Jonny Fairplay and Victoria Fuller. In the end, Cannatella and Mizanin won the show, taking home the prize money and several other prizes.

Cannatella appeared in the USA Network reality series Dr. Steve-O. She was the first cast member signed to the CMT show Hulk Hogan's Celebrity Championship Wrestling after intensive training to become a professional wrestler known as "The Red Hot Redneck".

Cannatella appeared briefly in episode 3 of the Lifetime television series Married at First Sight, as the friend and wedding guest of Henry, one of the groomsmen.

In September 2023, it was announced that Cannatella would be a contestant on Peacock's second season of The Traitors. The season premiered in January 2024. Trishelle, along with Challenge alumnus CT, were declared winners as Faithfuls.

=== Modeling and appearances ===
Cannatella has posed nude for Playboy magazine and the online Playboy Cyber Club. She also appeared in a Playboy DVD. She played quarterback for the New York Euphoria in Lingerie Bowl III, winning MVP in their victory.

Cannatella appears in William Hung's music video for his single "She Bangs". During the 2007 Super Bowl, she appeared in a commercial for GoDaddy.com alongside former WWE Diva Candice Michelle. Later that year, she also appeared in the May 2007 issue of Stuff and on their website to promote her new television series VIP Passport, in which she and several other women fly to hot-spots around the world. Cannatella made an appearance as the female love interest for Michael Vampire’s character in the Vampires Everywhere! music video "Immortal Love" off their 2011 debut album Kiss the Sun Goodbye.

=== Poker career ===
Cannatella is also a poker player. She finished third in the 2010 World Poker Tour Invitational Tournament and won $20,000. In 2013, Cannatella shot a pilot in Barcelona for a poker reality show titled Living the Life with Amanda Kimmel of Survivor.

=== Personal life ===
Trishelle Cannatella was raised in the town of Cut Off, Louisiana, and attended the University of Southern Mississippi (USM), where she studied broadcast journalism. While attending USM, she was a member of the Chi Omega sorority and involved with the Student Alumni Association.

In 2017 Cannatella married John Hensz, a pilot for Delta and a fighter pilot in the National Guard. The couple tied the knot in March 2017 in a New Orleans ceremony. They got engaged in July 2016 in the French Quarter of New Orleans.

In a 2026 podcast interview with Mark Long, Cannatella admitted her attraction to women saying she could go either way.”

== Filmography ==
=== Film ===
Year	Title	Role	Notes
2004	The Hillz	Party Goer #1	
2005	The Scorned	Nichola	
2007	The Dukes of Hazzard: The Beginning	Ally Handy	
2007	33 Griffith Lane	Neighbor	
2008	Ninja Cheerleaders	Courtney	
2012	Melvin Smarty	Freda	
2012	The Martini Shot	Lisa	

=== Television ===
Year	Title	Role	Notes
2002	The Real World: Las Vegas	Herself	
2003	The Real World You Never Saw: Las Vegas	Herself	
2003	Punk'd	Herself	
2003	Reality TV Secrets: How to Get on the Show!	Herself	
2003	The New Tom Green Show	Herself	Air date: June 24, 2003
2003	Playboy: Girls of Reality TV	Herself	
2003	Real World/Road Rules Challenge: The Gauntlet	Contestant	Eliminated (9 episodes)
2003	Steve-O: Out on Bail	Herself	
2004	The Surreal Life	Herself	
2004	Real Hot	Herself	
2004	Battle Scars: From the Gauntlet to the Inferno	Herself	Interviewee
2004	Real World/Road Rules Challenge: The Inferno	Contestant	Eliminated (4 episodes)
2004	Spring Break Celebrity Fantasies	Herself	
2004	William Hung: Hangin' with Hung	Herself	
2005	Lingerie Bowl	Herself	Host
2005	Kill Reality	Herself	
2005	Battle of the Network Reality Stars	Herself	Host
2005	Celebrity Poker Showdown	Herself	
2005	Reality Unleashed	Herself	
2005	Lingerie Bowl	Herself	Host
2006	Criminal Minds	Jane	Episode: "Sex, Birth, and Death"
2006	American Cannibal: The Road to Reality	Herself	
2007	Reunited: The Real World Las Vegas	Herself	
2007	VIP Passport	Herself	
2007	Dr. Steve-O	Herself	
2008	Hulk Hogan's Celebrity Championship Wrestling	Herself	
2012	The Challenge: Battle of the Seasons	Contestant	Runner-up (13 episodes, including reunion special)
2013	The Challenge: Rivals II	Contestant	Quit (3 episodes)
2020	Married at First Sight	Herself	Friend of groom Henry
2021	The Challenge: All Stars (season 1)	Contestant	Eliminated (2 episodes)
2024	The Traitors (season 2)	Contestant - Faithful	Co-winner with CT Tamburello
2024	Below Deck Mediterranean	Herself	Season 9

=== Music Videos ===
Year	Title	Music Video	Album	Notes
2010	Vampires Everywhere!	Immortal Love	Kiss the Sun Goodbye	
