= A Room Full of Nothing =

- Directed by: Elena Weinberg and Duncan Coe
- Written by: Duncan Coe
- Produced by: Elena Weinberg and Duncan Coe
- Starring: Ivy Meehan; Duncan Coe
- Cinematography: Charlie Pearce
- Edited by: Duncan Coe
- Music by: Michael Sempert
- Distributed by: Random Media The Orchard (company)
- Release dates: March 22, 2019 (Method Fest Independent Film Festival); April 21, 2020
- Running time: 86 minutes
- Country: United States
- Language: English

A Room Full of Nothing is a 2019 American independent, drama film written by Duncan Coe and directed by Coe and Elena Weinberg, starring Coe and Ivy Meehan.

== Plot ==
Phyllis (Ivy Meehan), an aspiring fine artist, and Barry (Duncan Coe), an actor in a community theater, are living together in a small house in an Austin suburb. Barry receives a scathing review of his performance in a low-budget play on the same day that the play is closing. During the wrap party his co-star tries to convince him that all problems can be solved by the use of manifesting and the law of attraction. The next day, while at a gallery opening where her art is on display, Phyllis is confronted by a daft art fan who questions her work and makes her second guess her choice to be an artist. Later that night she overhears her boss talking to another patron as they criticize the work her boss previously praised. Phyllis takes her art from the wall of the gallery before storming out in defiance.

That night, Barry confides in Phyllis that he wishes he could just take a vacation. As they drink a bottle of whiskey he and Phyllis jokingly "manifest" to the universe that they wish everyone would disappear and it could just be the two of them alone in the world. The next morning, Barry goes to check for his newspaper as he always does to discover it is undelivered. He drives to his local convenience store to find it closed. He begins to notice that nobody else is out on the streets. He returns home to confront Phyllis, suspecting they had forgotten about a national holiday, and he and Phyllis head out into the city to investigate. They find the city streets empty with no signs of life. They determine that their "manifesting" worked. Barry falls asleep in the back yard to the light of the moon.

The next morning, Barry discovers a previously unknown stream behind their house that leads to a grotto and swimming hole. At home Phyllis wakes to discover Barry is missing and fearing he disappeared too she has a panic attack and nearly asphyxiates in their yard. Barry returns and she chastises him for leaving. Reunited they bask in their newfound freedom. Phyllis spends the next several days delving into her artwork while Barry goes stir crazy. Soon the house power goes out and the summer heat is suffocating. Suffering from cabin fever they set off to spend some time in the woods behind their house. While away from their home Barry doubles-down on his questioning of their purpose in life, the nature of art, and the need for human contact while Phyllis is content with living out alone together their lives. On their return to the house they become lost in the wood and spend the night in the shade of a cliff. Barry has an epiphany and makes Phyllis "manifest" again but that this time they should wish they were back in civilization with their old lives. Phyllis unsuccessfully gives a half-assed attempt at manifesting.

The next day they continue to travel through the woods in order to find their home but the long journey becomes tiresome and Barry's spirit is defeated. They resign themselves to the idea that all of civilization is now gone and it's really just the two of them left in the woods alone. Phyllis attempts to convince Barry that they're better off together. Barry continues to spiral into a depression and confesses a dislike for their new reality and he wishes they were no longer stuck in the woods. Barry sleeps that night under Phyllis' watchful eye.

The next morning they wake to find the forest has disappeared and they're in the middle of a barren desert. Barry's sanity breaks and he accepts his new desolate reality. He and Phyllis play make-believe in the desert sand and imagine they got that vacation after all and they bask in the breeze of a coastal ocean. In the desert Phyllis exclaims that she got exactly what she wanted: to be with Barry. He has a final epiphany and comes to realize that everything they've experienced has been Phyllis' doing. She was the one who wished away everyone in the universe, wished away all civilization, and manifested away the forest which leads to them being alone in a desert. Barry confronts Phyllis about her controlling their reality and she denies his claim that she's selfishly acting for her own happiness. He runs from her and she gives chase. He falls and tumbles down a hill where he hits his head on a piece of driftwood. She mourns over his lifeless body and eschews all her former decisions but the damage is already done and Barry perishes. Phyllis' conscience is left lifeless in blackness and she's must live out her days alone, just as she wished the night she manifested all the people out of the world.

== Cast ==
- Ivy Meehan as Phyllis
- Duncan Coe as Barry
- Anna Schatte as Jamie
- Danielle Evon Ploeger as Suzie
- Marco Perella as Steve
- Pamela L. Paek as Kim
- James C. Leary as David
- Ammie Masterson as The Casting Director
- Ian Pala as Daft Art Fan
- Catherine Grady as Producer Jenny
- Austin Alexander as Producer Casey
- Chris Humphrey as Beatrice
- Mike Carreon as Stagehand
- Taylor Juarez as Girl at Ticket Counter
- Elena Weinberg as Hipster Girl
- Rob Novak as Voice of the Sun
- Kristen Kurtis as Voice of the Wind

== Production ==
Funding for the film was provided in part through its participation in the Seed & Spark Hometown Heroes Rally hosted by the Duplass Brothers in 2017 where it was a finalist and recipient of the first annual Oh Shit Grant. The Seed & Spark campaign to fund the film raised $15,835 from 285 supporters. The script was a semifinalist in the 2018 Screencraft Film Fund.

== Release ==
The film had its world premiere at Method Fest Independent Film Festival in Beverly Hills on March 22, 2019 where it won the Maverick Award for Quality in Low-Budget Filmmaking. The film had its Texas premiere as an official selection at the 26th Annual Austin Film Festival in the Texas Independents category. It continued with festival appearances at Lake Travis Film Festival; Hill Country Film Festival; Twister Alley Film Festival; Fort Myers Beach International Film Festival where it won People's Choice Award and Meehan won Best Performance in a Feature Film; Cinequest Film & Creativity Festival; and the Lost River Film Festival.

The film was distributed by Random Media via a label deal with The Orchard Company and released worldwide on April 21, 2020.
