= Reunited: The Real World Las Vegas =

- The cast of Reunited: The Real World Las Vegas
- Created by: Mary-Ellis Bunim; Jonathan Murray
- Starring: Alton Williams; Arissa Hill; Brynn Smith; Frank Roessler; Irulan Wilson; Steven Hill; Trishelle Cannatella
- Country of origin: United States
- No. of episodes: 7

Production
- Running time: 22 minutes

Original release
- Network: MTV
- Release: May 30 – July 11, 2007

Reunited: The Real World Las Vegas is a seven-episode, 2007 spin-off miniseries of The Real World that reunited the cast of the 2002 season of The Real World: Las Vegas to live in the same Palms Hotel and Casino suite they lived in for the original series, five years after filming ended on The Real World: Las Vegas. Filming began April 9, 2007, and lasted until approximately April 26. Trishelle Cannatella was the last cast member to agree to appear, as assurances were needed that filming would not conflict with her schedule. The mini-series premiered May 30, 2007 and concluded on July 11, 2007.

== Cast ==
Cast Member	Age^{1}	Hometown	Since appearing on The Real World: Las Vegas...
Arissa Hill	28	Malden, Massachusetts	Arissa moved to Las Vegas shortly after filming ended. There, she was married to a bodyguard she met in Vegas, but the relationship fell apart when Arissa agreed to appear on Real World/Road Rules Challenge: Battle of the Sexes 2. Arissa made it to the final three women, but ultimately lost to the men. Her appearance on Battle of the Sexes 2 caused some friction among her former cast members, as Alton, Irulan and Steven all claimed on the now defunct Fishbowl.com that she was pretentious.
Frank Roessler	27	Lewisburg, Pennsylvania	Frank moved to Los Angeles after filming ended. He appeared on Battle of the Sexes 2. There, he began a brief relationship with fellow contestant Angela Trimbur (from Road Rules: X-Treme), but he didn't like the way in which their relationship was portrayed. During the show, Frank was accepted to the University of Southern California Marshall Business School to earn a Master's degree in Business Administration, though he never enrolled. Frank is now attending graduate school at UCLA. He appeared on Real World/Road Rules Challenge: The Gauntlet 3 in 2008. He was on the Rookies team, entering his 2nd challenge. He and Jillian (from Road Rules: X-Treme) began a small relationship while on the show. He made it to the end and won $50,000. At the reunion show, Frank said that he and Jillian have moved in together.
Trishelle Cannatella	27	Cut Off, Louisiana	Trishelle moved to Los Angeles and appeared on Real World/Road Rules Challenge: The Gauntlet and Real World/Road Rules Challenge: The Inferno. She began dating Mike "The Miz" Mizanin (from The Real World: Back to New York) during The Gauntlet. She left The Inferno on a sour note after being berated by The Real World: Back to New York's Coral Smith. She moved on to pursue a variety of different projects. Trishelle has appeared numerous times on the internet broadcast of The Real World After Show on the MTV website. Trishelle has posed nude for Playboy magazine and the online Playboy Cyber Club. In 2012, she returned to compete on The Challenge: Battle of the Seasons and on The Challenge: Rivals II in 2013.
Brynn Smith	26	Portland, Oregon	Brynn moved back to Portland after the series ended and began to seriously date Austin, who visited during the filming of the original series. Brynn and Austin eventually married and had two sons, Halen and Nash. Brynn and Austin just had a baby girl, Jovi. Brynn still lives in Portland.
Alton Williams	27	San Diego, California	Alton dated Irulan for three years and moved to Los Angeles with her. He appeared on The Gauntlet and Kill Reality with Irulan, and shortly after he broke up with her, he appeared on Real World/Road Rules Challenge: The Gauntlet 2 which he won. Alton also appeared on the Real World/Road Rules Challenge: The Inferno III. He moved back to San Diego shortly after breaking up with Irulan. Alton returned to compete on The Challenge: Battle of the Seasons in 2012.
Steven Hill	29	San Marcos, Texas	Steven appeared on Battle of the Sexes 2. He was kicked off after he slapped Shane Landrum (from Road Rules: Campus Crawl) for talking during a silent mission. He was the host of a radio show over on the Fishbowl for a couple of months, during which he claimed that he would never do another Challenge. Having previously studied business at Texas State University, he is now studying psychology. He has remarried to a model named Donna and they are new parents.
Irulan Wilson	26	Bronx, New York	Irulan moved in with Alton and they dated for three years. She appeared on The Gauntlet, but lost near the end. Irulan and Alton broke up before he appeared on The Gauntlet 2. She is now a photographer living in Queens, New York, with her current boyfriend.

^Note 1: Age at the time of filming.

== Episodes ==
No.	Title	Original release date
1	"Reunited and it Feels So Awkward"	May 30, 2007
2	"Bygones"	June 6, 2007
3	"Suite and Sour"	June 13, 2007
4	"Ninja Stars"	June 20, 2007
5	"The Dating Game"	June 27, 2007
6	"Let the Games Begin"	July 4, 2007
7	"Last Call"	July 11, 2007

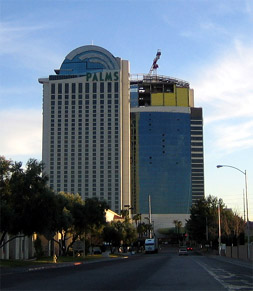
Photo of the Palms hotel tower and the new Fantasy Tower.

== After filming ==
After the cast had moved out, the Palms Hotel and Casino opened the doors of the Real World suite for guests of the hotel.

Since filming of the original season ended in 2002, The Real World suite has been host to many famous celebrities, including Britney Spears. The Palms has also undergone an extensive expansion, including a new tower, including Fantasy Suites, which are closely modeled after the original Real World suite in the original tower.
