= What If... Kahhori Reshaped the World? =

- What If...? episode
- Promotional poster
- Episode no.: Season 2 Episode 6
- Directed by: Bryan Andrews
- Written by: Ryan Little
- Editing by: Anton Capaldo-Smith
- Original release date: December 27, 2023
- Running time: 34 minutes

Cast
- Devery Jacobs as Kahhori; Kiawentiio as Wáhta; Jeremy White as Atahraks; Gabriel Romero as Rodrigo Alphonso Gonzolo; Benedict Cumberbatch as Doctor Strange Supreme; Carolina Ravassa as Queen Isabella of Spain; Clancy Brown as Surtur; Jeff Bergman as Odin

Episode chronology
| ← Previous "What If... Captain Carter Fought the Hydra Stomper?" | Next → "What If... Hela Found the Ten Rings?" |
- What If...? season 2

"What If... Kahhori Reshaped the World?" is the sixth episode of the second season and fifteenth episode overall of the American animated television series What If...?, based on the Marvel Comics series of the same name. It explores what would happen if the Tesseract crash-landed in the Haudenosaunee Confederacy in pre-colonial America, and Kahhori, a Mohawk woman, gained the powers of the Space Stone to help save her people from conquistadors. The episode was written by Ryan Little and directed by Bryan Andrews.

Jeffrey Wright narrates the series as the Watcher, with this episode also starring the voices of Devery Jacobs (Kahhori), Kiawentiio, Jeremy White, Gabriel Romero, Benedict Cumberbatch, Carolina Ravassa, Clancy Brown, and Jeff Bergman. Work on a second season of What If...? had begun by December 2019, with Andrews and head writer A. C. Bradley returning from the first season. Development for this episode began around April 2020. Kahhori, an original MCU character, and information on the episode was first revealed in March 2023, with the creatives working with members of the Mohawk Nation and the Smithsonian Institution to ensure cultural authenticity throughout the episode. The episode is presented in the Mohawk and Spanish language with subtitles. Animation was provided by SDFX Studios, with Scott Wright serving as head of animation.

"What If... Kahhori Reshaped the World?" was released on Disney+ on December 27, 2023.

== Plot ==
After Surtur destroys Asgard during Ragnarok, the Tesseract crash-lands in the Haudenosaunee Confederacy in pre-colonial America. (Note: Odin being unable to place the Tesseract on Earth because of Ragnarok is where the story diverges from the Marvel Cinematic Universe.) The Tesseract falls to the bottom of a lake, releasing its energy into it and granting it magical properties. After numerous tribespeople disappear while interacting with it, it becomes known as the Forbidden Lake.

In the late 15th century, a young Mohawk woman, Kahhori, and her brother Wáhta are hunted by Spanish conquistadors led by Rodrigo Alphonso Gonzolo, who have ransacked their village in search of the Fountain of Youth. The conquistadors chase them into a cave, where they capture Wáhta and shoot Kahhori, causing her to fall into the Forbidden Lake. The Tesseract creates a portal and teleports her to another dimension, where she is nursed back to health by fellow Mohawk people. One of the villagers, Atahraks, explains that people who interact with the lake are teleported to the "Sky World", where they gain powers and become immortal, but are unable to return home. Kahhori becomes acquainted with the Sky World villagers and familiarizes herself with her new powers with one instance having her successfully harvesting fruit from the back of the giant tusked bison-like creatures.

Gonzolo later dispatches men into the lake, believing it to be the Fountain of Youth. The conquistadors are teleported to the Sky World, where they attempt to attack the villagers, but are stopped by Kahhori, who forces the portal from the sky to the ground and returns home to rescue her people from the conquistadors. She is later joined by the Sky World villagers, who help her defeat the conquistadors and rescue her people with Kahhori slaying Gonzolo.

Sometime later, Queen Isabella of Spain is with her royal court in the throne room when she gets word that Gonzolo's expedition has failed to return. Just then, Kahhori and the Sky World villagers arrive. She uses her abilities to pressure Queen Isabella in making peace with the Mohawk people. The Watcher narrates that Kahhori and the Sky People have made peace with the other countries. Doctor Strange Supreme appears from a portal and congratulates Kahhori, saying that he has been looking for her.

== Production ==
=== Development ===
Promotional image of Kahhori

In December 2019, Marvel Studios president Kevin Feige revealed that work had already begun on a second season of the animated anthology series What If...?, based on the Marvel Comics series of the same name. It explores how the Marvel Cinematic Universe (MCU) films would be altered if certain events occurred differently. A. C. Bradley and Bryan Andrews returned from the first season as head writer and lead director, and they executive produce alongside Brad Winderbaum, Kevin Feige, Louis D'Esposito, and Victoria Alonso. Ryan Little wrote the sixth episode, titled "What If... Kahhori Reshaped the World?", which explores what would happen if the Tesseract crash-lands in the Haudenosaunee Confederacy in pre-colonial America, and is set in an alternate timeline in which European colonization of the Americas had not occurred. Work on this episode began around April 2020, and the "what if" idea of if European colonization did not occur was one of the early ideas Andrews conceived for the series when he was first hired.

"What If... Kahhori Reshaped the World?" introduces an original MCU character: Kahhori, a young Mohawk woman whose name means "she stirs the forest". The episode is presented in the Mohawk and Spanish languages with English subtitles. Little and Andrews worked for four years with members of the Mohawk Nation such as historian Doug George, who provided insight into the history of the Akwesasne region (part of present day Upstate New York), and Mohawk language expert Cecelia King, to create Kahhori's look and world to ensure the cultural authenticity of the episode, and Disney's diversity department brought in consultants from the Smithsonian Institution to ensure its representation of Indigenous Americans was accurate for the design, story, and music. Kahhori actress Devery Jacobs called the episode "a huge opportunity" for "language and cultural revitalization" and was empowered by the fact a studio such as Marvel took the care to introduce an authentic native superhero. Bradley noted that early in the process, someone outside of the What If...? creative team had suggested the episode be Marvel's version of The Last of the Mohicans (1992), which she said "got scary because the last thing you want to do is repeat — however well-intentioned — mistakes of the past". The consultants found the names Kahhori and Atahraks (which means "he gnaws the earth") from a 1952 manuscript containing a list of Mohawk names from Mohawk scholar Charles Cooke. These names were written phonetically in the manuscript, which was retained for What If...? to better allow audiences to pronounce them, and thus do not include diacritical markings of the modern Mohawk language. The consultants also ensured the names used in the episodes were not currently in use, keeping with longhouse naming conventions that sees one name used at any given time until that person dies.

=== Writing ===
I had a wonderful writing mentor who worked extensively with the Indigenous community in upstate New York, and I was excited to draw on that experience to build an entirely original corner of the MCU with storylines for new Indigenous heroes written from a place of respect for past generations and optimism for future ones.

— Writer Ryan Little on his inspiration and desire for the episode

The episode sees the Tesseract transform a lake into an outer space gateway, which leads Kahhori on a journey to discover her cosmic powers and recruit allies to help save her people. The Forbidden Lake served as an analogous to the Fountain of Youth, which in this universe brings the Spanish conquistadors to the Akwesasne region, an area they never conquered. Jacobs felt writing the episode was a "learning curve" for Marvel in that they tried to present a script that was respectful of the Mohawk language that is largely spoken in monotone (opposed to English which has multiple inflections), while still being "audibly interesting and dynamic". The script was translated into two-to-three separate versions of Mohawk because the historians did not know for certain exactly how the language was spoken back then. Early discussions for the series saw the creatives explore the idea of an episode centered on an MCU artifact rather than a character. They considered exploring in the first season the Tesseract's history over centuries in a The Red Violin (1998)–inspired episode, and in the second, discussed the concept of if Vibranium had not landed in Wakanda; these two ideas were eventually combined. The Mohawk consultants introduced the creatives to the concepts of the Sky World and Thunder Beings in their culture, as well as the importance of portals and water, with water being looked at as a threshold to travel from one world to the next.

=== Casting ===
Jeffrey Wright narrates the episode as the Watcher, with Marvel planning to have other characters in the series voiced by the actors who portrayed them in the MCU films. The episode stars the voices of Devery Jacobs as Kahhori, Kiawentiio as Wáhta, Jeremy White as Atahraks, Gabriel Romero as Rodrigo Alphonso Gonzolo, Benedict Cumberbatch as Doctor Strange Supreme, Carolina Ravassa as Queen Isabella of Spain, Clancy Brown as Surtur, and Jeff Bergman as Odin; Bergman replaces Anthony Hopkins.

Jacobs auditioned for the part in August 2020 and, after being cast, improved upon her basic Mohawk language and learned how to speak it more fluently, given Mohawk is Kahhori's first language as she had not been influenced by Western culture. Jacobs portrays Bonnie in Marvel Studios' live-action miniseries Echo (2024), which she called a "coincidence" that she was part of two Marvel Studios projects and noting the two characters were not related. In addition to voicing Atahraks, White was tasked with casting the additional Mohawk voices for the episode.

=== Animation ===
Animation for the episode was provided by SDFX Studios, with Scott Wright serving as head of animation. Andrews developed the series' cel-shaded animation style with Ryan Meinerding, the head of visual development at Marvel Studios. Though the series has a consistent art style, elements such as the camera and color palette differ between episodes.

=== Music ===
Traditional Mohawk music was incorporated into the episode's score, some of which still exists today.

== Marketing ==
Kahhori and information about the episode was first revealed in March 2023, when a Funko Soda figurine was made available.

== Release ==
"What If... Kahhori Reshaped the World?" was released on Disney+ on December 27, 2023. The episode was screened ahead of time to members of First Nations and Mohawk tribes in eastern North America, such as around Montreal and the East Coast of the United States. A Kanienʼkéha (Mohawk) language dub is also available on Disney+; Little had the idea to be able to present the episode entirely in Mohawk, with White serving as dubbing director and linguist supervisor/language coach for this version after casting the voices for it. The Mohawk dub was completed between September and early December 2023. An English version of the episode was also made available on Disney+ under the series' "Extras" tab.

== Reception ==
=== Critical response ===
Arezou Amin at Collider called this episode the "most interesting" of the season, saying it "should be celebrated for how bold it is". She felt the episode "shines for the way it focuses on an Indigenous hero and an Indigenous language, and allows its characters to express fun, joy, and family without stripping it all away to view in retrospect through a lens of colonial-inflicted tragedy", and was hopeful the third season would include similar original, bold stories. Dais Johnston of Inverse felt Kahhori provided "much-needed Indigenous representation to the MCU" with the character "[breaking] new ground for the MCU". She called the episode a "huge risk" that ultimately works given it "corrects a blindspot in the MCU but also creates a character who comes from a completely different time and culture, one that doesn't have to be made up like Atlantis, Wakanda, and Asgard".

Nevertheless, Spanish websites Cinemanía, Infobae and Espinof reported online criticisms of the episode due to its portrayal of conquistadors and other historical inaccuracies which, alongside similar attributions in Eternals (2021) and Black Panther: Wakanda Forever (2022), were perceived as promoting the Spanish Black Legend.

=== Accolades ===
Jacobs' performance was an honorable mention for TVLine Performer of the Week for the week ending December 30, 2023, with Matt Webb Mitovich stating Jacobs "instantly engaged viewers" to Kahhori, giving the character "both a headstrong resolve and an understandable curiosity" about her new powers and "imbued the character with a commanding confidence". For the 51st Annie Awards, Ryan Barringer, Rajkumar Gurudu, Bipin Kumar Patra, and Pranil Ravindra Mahajan were nominated for Outstanding Achievement for Animated Effects in an Animated Television/Broadcast Production for their work on the episode.
