= James C. Leary =

American actor

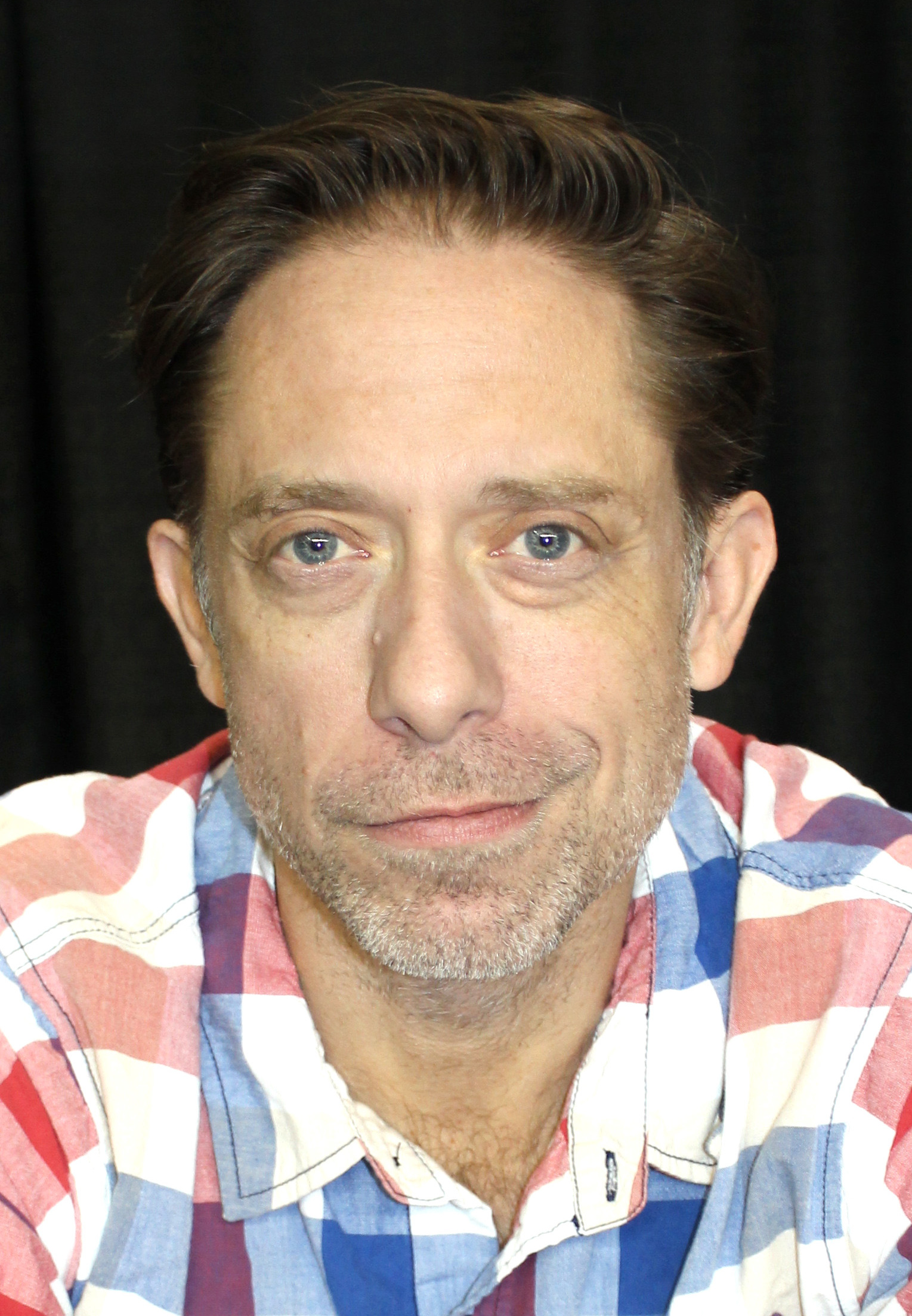
- Born: August 26, 1973 (age 51)
- Occupation: Actor

James Charles Leary (born August 26, 1973) is an American actor best known for his portrayal of the demon Clem who appears in seasons six and seven of the television series Buffy the Vampire Slayer.

== Filmography/television ==
- A Room Full of Nothing (2019) – David
- Pure Shock Value (2009) – Julian Quintana
- The Cabonauts, TV episode: "Game of the Week" (2009) – Jake
- Unemployed (2008) – Dexter
- Ladrón que roba a ladrón (2007) – Building Manager
- Lovers, Liars & Lunatics (2006) – Policeman #1
- The Comeback, TV episode: "Valerie Triumphs at the Upfronts" (2005) – Network Executive
- Stunt C*cks (2004) – Bill
- Buffy the Vampire Slayer, TV series (2001–2003; recurring) – Clem
- Clay (2002)
- Los Beltrán (1999) – Kevin Lynch
- Chi Girl (1999) – 1st Sound Boy

== Video games ==
- Pirate101 – El Toro, Frogfather (voice)
- Wizard101 – King Pyat MourningSword, James T. Pork (voice)
