= Emiliano Díez =

Cuban actor and singer

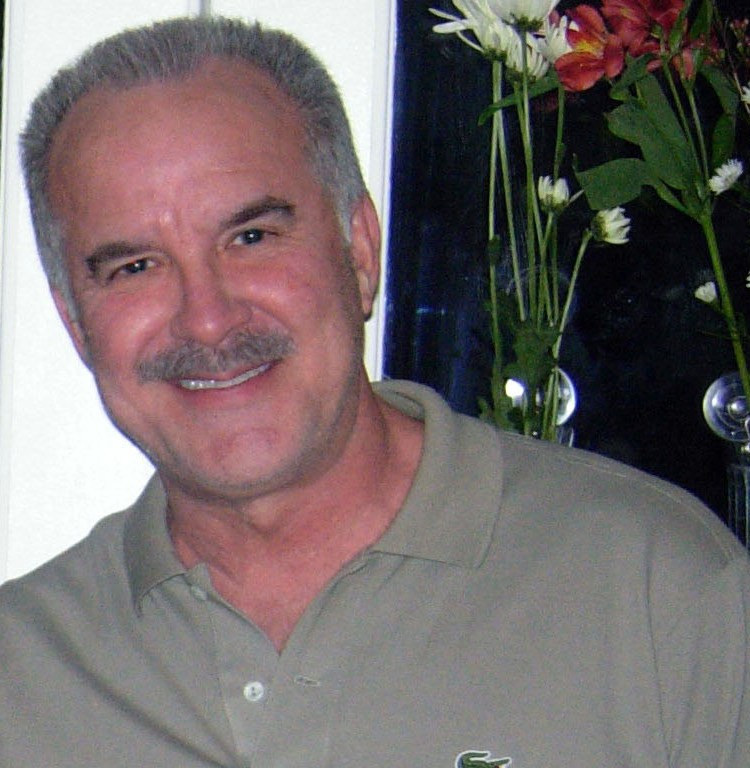
- Díez in 2009
- Born: Emiliano Díez; August 26, 1953 (age 73); Havana, Cuba
- Occupation: Actor
- Years active: 1976–present

Emiliano Díez (born August 26, 1953) is a Cuban-American actor. He is best known for his role as Dr. Vic Palmero, George's father-in-law, in the sitcom George Lopez, as well as his role as Manny Beltrán in the sitcom Los Beltrán.

== Early life ==
Díez began his acting career in 1976 in theatre and television. In 1980 at the age of 26, he immigrated to Miami to extend his career by doing numerous popular plays like Blithe Spirit, La Cage Aux Folles, The Rose Tattoo and many others.

== Career ==
Díez also appeared in radio and television commercials, as well as the soap operas El Magnate, Marielena, Guadalupe and for two seasons he was cast for the leading role playing Manny Beltrán in the award-winning sitcom, Los Beltrán.

He later crossed over doing American films and television guest starring in Everybody Loves Raymond, Yes, Dear, MDs, Manhattan, AZ, The Brothers Mamita and a recurring role for nine episodes in the daytime drama Passions. He also appeared on seaQuest DSV, Fortune Hunter, Sins of the City, Nostromo, Gang Related as El Mozo, Bates Motel as Alex's dad, and co-starred on George Lopez as Dr. Victor Palmero, Angie's father. His film credits include Sudden Terror: The Hijacking of School Bus #17, Water, Mud and Factories, The Last Straw and Cafe and Beer. He appeared in Adventures in Babysitting as Leon Vasquez. He also voiced Francisco in the animated television series, Elena of Avalor.

== Filmography ==
=== Film ===
Year	Title	Role	Notes
1999	Water, Mud and Factories	Pepe	
1999	The Last Marshal	Maria's Father	
2003	Cafe and Tobacco	Jorge	
2010	Las Angeles	Baltasar	
2012	Step Up Revolution	Mayor Fernandez	
2014	Quiero ser fiel	Mr. Ramon	
2019	3 from Hell	Rodrigo	

=== Television ===
Year	Title	Role	Notes
1991	The 100 Lives of Black Jack Savage	Colonel Mendez	Episode: "A Pirate Story"
1994	Marielena	Rene	Unknown episode(s)
1996	Sudden Terror: The Hijacking of School Bus #17	Eduardo Sanchez	TV movie
1996–1997	Nostromo	Don Pepe	Television mini-series 4 episodes
2000	Manhattan, AZ	Mayor Gonzalez	Episode: "Cattle Drive"
2000–2001	Los Beltrán	Manny Beltran	20 episodes
2001	Passions	Francisco Lopez	9 episodes
2002	Miami Sands	Mr. Hernandez	Episode: "#1.110"
2002	Yes, Dear	Cheese Host	Episode: "Mr. Big Shot"
2002	MDs	Fernando	Episode: "Wing and a Prayer"
2002–2007	George Lopez	Dr. Victor "Vic" Garcia Lantigua Palmero	54 episodes
2003	Everybody Loves Raymond	Hector	Episode: "The Bachelor Party"
2003	Te amaré en silencio	Leandro	Episode: "#1.1"
2007	Living with Fran	Principal Meechum	Episode: "School Ties"
2010	Miami Medical	Alberto Zambrano	Episode:"Like a Hurricane"
2012	Sofia the First: Once Upon a Princess	Guest Star (voice)	TV movie
2013	Anger Management	Priest	Episode: "Charlie & Catholicism"
2014	Gang Related	El Mozo	5 episodes
2015	Bates Motel	Alex's Dad	Episode: "The Last Supper"
2016	Adventures in Babysitting	Leon Vasquez	TV movie
2016–2020	Elena of Avalor	Francisco (voice)	Main cast
2017	NCIS	Jefe	House Divided
2017	Major Crimes	Eduardo Morales	Episode: “Dead Drop”
2018	One Day at a Time	Padre Jose	Episodes: "Hello, Penelope" and "Not Yet"
2018	Designated Survivor	President Ortega	Episode: "Grief”
2019	Blue Bloods	Wilson Ortega	Episode: “Another Look”

== See also ==
- List of Cubans
