= The Real World: Las Vegas (2002 season) =

Coordinates: 36°06′50″N 115°11′39″W

- The cast of The Real World: Las Vegas
- Starring: Arissa Hill; Frank Roessler; Trishelle Cannatella; Alton Williams; Brynn Smith; Steven Hill; Irulan Wilson
- No. of episodes: 28

Release
- Original network: MTV
- Original release: September 17, 2002 – April 1, 2003

Season chronology
- ← Previous; The Real World: Chicago Next → The Real World: Paris

The Real World: Las Vegas is the twelfth season of MTV's reality television series The Real World, which focuses on a group of diverse strangers living together for several months in a different city each season, as cameras follow their lives and interpersonal relationships. It is the first season to be filmed in the Mountain States region of the United States, specifically in Nevada.

The season featured seven people who lived in a converted penthouse suite on the 28th floor of the Las Vegas Palms Casino and Resort, which production started from February 13 until June 21, 2002. The season premiered on September 17 of that year, consisted of 28 episodes, which along with the Denver season, is the highest number to date. This was the first of three seasons of The Real World to be filmed in Las Vegas. The show made a return to the city twice: in the twenty-fifth and the thirty-first seasons, the latter set in Downtown Las Vegas.

Due to the popularity of the season, MTV ordered the spin-off miniseries Reunited: The Real World Las Vegas that reunited the cast to live in the same Palms Hotel and Casino suite they filmed the original series in, five years after filming ended on The Real World: Las Vegas.

== The residence ==
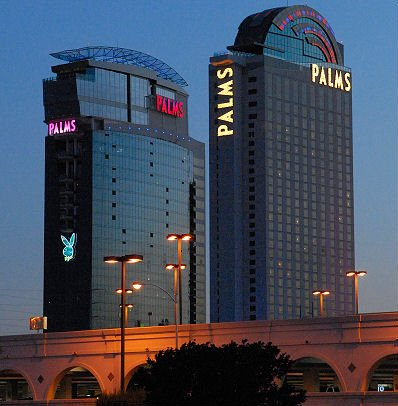
The Palms Casino Hotel, where the cast resided

The owner of The Palms Casino Hotel, where the season was filmed, asked for production to cast exclusively people over 21 years old. Thus this was the first season in which all the castmates were at least that old.

The Palms demolished six rooms to make the hotel suite in which the season was filmed, at a cost of over $2 million USD. It was designed by Sharmila Tankha of the Jerde Partnership, the same firm that designed the hotel itself. Unlike previous Real World residences, the suite is not decorated with IKEA furnishings.

The suite, which is now called "The Real World Suite", is one of few former Real World residences that not only overall remains in the condition in which it was used for filming (minor changes have been made, such as the addition of doors for the bedrooms, TV's and the removal of the Confessional), but in which the public can potentially reside. The hotel rents the suite for $11,200 a night (including tax), and has done so to numerous celebrities who have stayed there. Among them are Britney Spears, who stayed in the suite on New Year's Eve 2004.

== Assignment ==
Most seasons of The Real World, beginning with the fifth, have included the assignment of a season-long group job or task to the housemates, continued participation in which has been mandatory to remain part of the cast since the Back to New York season. The Las Vegas housemates had various jobs throughout the season involving the Palms Casino and Resort in which they lived, including promotional work for the night club, Rain in the Desert, cocktail waiting, and go-go dancing.

== Cast ==
Cast member	Age^{1}	Hometown
Arissa Hill	22	Malden, Massachusetts
Arissa is a half-African American, half-white woman who MTV describes as a "tough girl with a heart of gold". She was raised in the projects with a single mother, which helped Arissa learn to be self-sufficient. Her self-sufficiency is what is determining her to transition from her early life into adulthood.
Frank Roessler	22	Lewisburg, Pennsylvania
Frank grew up in a traditional family with a stay-at-home mother and a father who owned a local pizzeria. MTV describes him as somebody who is 'affable, talkative and open' as well as somebody who makes friends easily.
Trishelle Cannatella	22	Cut Off, Louisiana
Trishelle is a southern woman who was raised in a small, conservative town with her devout Christian mother, who would take the family to church three to four times a week. Her mother died from a brain tumor when Trishelle was only 14 years old.
Brynn Smith	21	Portland, Oregon
Brynn is a woman who, as MTV describes, has a "razor-sharp wit" and is not afraid to say whatever is on her mind. Newly single, Brynn is ready to flirt with the boys in Las Vegas. During her time is Las Vegas, Brynn began working as a go-go dancer. In episode 11, she revealed to Alton that she had once been raped, and that her father is homosexual.
Alton Williams	22	San Diego, California
Alton grew up as a Navy brat, and has lived in many different parts of the country because of this. He has close relationships to his extended family. MTV describes him as a "source of inspiration to people around him" and has a positive outlook on life. When he was 14 years old, his nine-year-old brother, Jonathan Sellers was kidnapped and murdered. In episode 11, he reveals that he was molested when he was six years old, and this along with his brother's death causes him discomfort around homosexuals.
Steven Hill	23	San Marcos, Texas
Steven had to learn to grow up on his own at a young age, and has been on his own since he was 16 years of age. While in business school, he supported himself by working as a topless bartender at a gay bar in his Texas hometown. When he was 22, he fell in love with a woman and married her, however the marriage ended in a divorce. In the midst of the divorce, he began a relationship with his roommate, Trishelle.
Irulan Wilson	21	Bronx, New York
Irulan is a biracial woman and had a typical childhood, up until her father's death when she was 6 years old. Because of this, she and her mother share a deep bond with one another. Growing up with body image issues her whole life, she has since overcome them, and is now a student at Parson's School of Design. She has an open relationship with her boyfriend, Gabe. MTV describes her as someone who is strong and not afraid of conflict.

^Note 1: Age at the time of filming.

== Episodes ==
No. overall	No. in season	Title	Original release date
235	1	"Welcome to Las Vegas!"	September 17, 2002
The seven roommates arrive at their Palms Casino Resort suite that they will be living in. After drawing numbers from a hat to determine the bedroom assignments, Alton offers to switch rooms with Irulan to allow her to share the room with Arissa that she wanted. Later, the roommates go to the hotel's Ghost Bar and then to a spa and enjoy a hot tub.
236	2	"Love Connection"	September 17, 2002
Frank has developed an attraction towards Trishelle, and although she likes him as well, she doesn't feel a deeper connection. Later at the nightclub, Steven and Trishelle make out while they are drunk, and then later do so in Frank's presence. When they return to the room, the two have sex, much to Frank's dismay.
237	3	"Word From Home"	September 24, 2002
Steven, Trishelle and Brynn participate in a threesome make-out session, but Trishelle regrets it the following morning because of her family at home does not approve of her lifestyle. Alton's ex-girlfriend, Melissa, tells him she thinks she might be pregnant, but it turns out to be a false alarm, much to his relief.
238	4	"Professional Partiers"	October 1, 2002
The roommates (except Brynn) are excited when they are informed their job will include throwing parties at the hotel's Rain nightclub. Arissa misses her boyfriend, Dario; she begins cuddling in bed with Steven, but gets out of the bed before she cheats. Later, Arissa is upset with Irulan because Irulan told Frank that Arissa and Steven had sex. Frank later apologizes, but tells Steven he did not really feel sorry.
239	5	"Touchy Situations"	October 8, 2002
The cast's boss, Marc, socializes with the women, at times making advances toward Irulan and Arissa, which they rebuff. After Irulan characterizes Marc's behavior as sexual harassment, and Marc himself as a "molester", Alton objects to this label as an inappropriate response to the problem. Frank urges Marc not to flirt with the women, despite Marc's insistence that the work environment makes this difficult. Irulan and Arissa later have a talk with Marc in which they clarify the matter and set boundaries for the rest of their time together. After Arissa and Alton are offended by Frank's characterization of Arissa as a "black bitch", she attempts to explain to the apologetic Frank how she is sensitive to such comments.
240	6	"Hey, Jealousy"	October 15, 2002
Brynn becomes envious of Steven and Trishelle's relationship, and one point, she assaults Steven with a fork, and later pushes him during an argument. He considers having her removed from the show, but Arissa encourages him to talk it over with Brynn before making a decision. After a long conversation between Steven and Brynn, he ultimately decides to allow her to stay in Las Vegas.
241	7	"Good to Be Bad"	October 22, 2002
For the next party that the roommates are throwing, they have to perform a dance on skis. Alton is displeased at having to dance with Steven, for fear that others will think he is gay. When Trishelle backs out of the dance, she is assigned to help promote the club with her co-workers, but instead starts flirting with a bartender. Later, after Trishelle overhears the other girls talking negatively about her in the confessional, she decides that she will start to work harder from now on.
242	8	"In The Spotlight"	October 29, 2002
As Alton is still dealing with his break-up with Melissa, he brings home a girl, much to the dismay of Arissa. When he finds out that Melissa cheated on him while they were together, he ends the relationship for good. Meanwhile, as Brynn is unsatisfied with her nightclub job, she becomes a go-go dancer to earn extra money.
243	9	"Stepping In"	November 5, 2002
When the girls notice Trishelle's eating habits, Irulan and Arissa become worried about her, since they both had eating disorders in the past, and they do not want Trishelle to become sick. Arissa has a one-on-one conversation with Trishelle about it, and Trishelle decides that she will try to eat more healthfully. Meanwhile, Alton has become attracted to Irulan, which worries her because her boyfriend, Gabe, is visiting soon and she does not want to cheat. When Alton and Irulan are making out in bed, he tells her he wants to stop because he wants to remain friends.
244	10	"Secret's Out"	November 13, 2002
Irulan informs Gabe about what had happened between her and Alton. Although he accepts it, he still feels guilty about the situation because he is still attracted to Irulan. Alton's mother comes to visit so he can sign some legal papers regarding his younger brother's abduction and murder.
245	11	"Out in the Open"	November 19, 2002
Steven's gay best friend, John, comes to visit, and Alton feels uncomfortable around homosexuals because of past traumatic experiences with them. Brynn tells Alton that her father is gay, and she helps Alton try to be more open-minded when it comes to other people's sexual preferences. Meanwhile, when Trishelle gets jealous of Steven talking to other girls, he tells her he just wants to keep their relationship casual. They later get back together by having unprotected sex, and Trishelle starts thinking she may be pregnant.
246	12	"Public Displays"	November 26, 2002
Frank meets a girl named Melanie at a club, and they spend time in the confessional together later. Arissa believes the two were having sex but, after Frank tells her they were only kissing, later apologizes to both of them. Meanwhile, Marc tells the group that they are not doing very well at their job.
247	13	"Opening Up"	December 3, 2002
The group is sent to a team-building workshop on self-improvement. Arissa has trust issues, and while taking at this workshop, she begins to open up more and learns how to trust her roommates as well as herself. During an exercise where the roommates have to choose who they will allow to live, the group chooses Arissa because they all feel she deserves a second chance at life. During this, Trishelle and Alton become closer as they share their experiences of losing loved ones.
248	14	"Pregnancy Scare"	December 10, 2002
Brynn becomes caught in a love triangle between Austin, a guy she met at home, and a local guy named Mo. When Austin comes to visit, she realizes that she wants to be with him, and they decide to commit to each other. Meanwhile, Trishelle takes a pregnancy test and although Steven tells her that he wouldn't mind having a kid, he is relieved when the test turns up negative.
249	15	"The Next Step"	December 17, 2002
Arissa is excited when Dario comes to visit and later gets in a physical fight at the club when another club-goer insults her. She fears this will get her fired from the job, however, Marc tells her that she needs to change her attitude and Arissa agrees to start making improvements. Meanwhile, Alton tries to become closer to Irulan, and although she and Gabe have an open relationship, Alton feels uncomfortable about it and he stops.
250	16	"Happy Birthday"	January 7, 2003
The roommates and Irulan celebrate her 22nd birthday, and Alton later has sex with another girl, Carrie. When Irulan finds out, she realizes that she does have feelings for Alton, and later confesses to Gabe about her feelings for Alton. Although upset, Gabe forgives her and she understands why she still loves Gabe.
251	17	"Back and Forth"	January 14, 2003
While Steven and Trishelle are having drunken sex, he tells her that he loves her and Trishelle is shocked at this news. However, Trishelle is upset when she learns that he did not mean it, and Steven decides it's best if the two stop dating. Meanwhile, when one of the bosses, Jean, tells the group that they need to take the job more seriously, they are assigned to go to Australia to promote the club, and while there, Frank and Trishelle start to bond with one another.
252	18	"Down Under"	January 21, 2003
While the group is still in Australia, Alton engages in a threesome with two Australian women. When the group returns to Las Vegas, Irulan finds out about his escapades and is upset enough to consider going home. Meanwhile, Arissa feels that her experience in Australia has been life-changing as she is realizing how enjoyable life can be.
253	19	"The Showdown"	January 28, 2003
As Irulan prepares to leave Las Vegas, Alton denies having had a threesome while in Australia. Later though, he tells her that she should not care what he does since she already has a boyfriend (Gabe). When Irulan tells Gabe about this, he breaks up with her. After a drunken, playful fight with Irulan and Alton, the two become friends again, although she is still upset with him.
254	20	"New Beginnings"	February 4, 2003
Arissa's mother informs her about a restraining order that was given to her from a neighbor, against whom she had previously had one issued. When her Uncle Robert comes to visit, and she chooses to celebrate her birthday with her roommates instead of him, he reacts badly. Her roommates tell her to stop worrying about her family and to not let them bother her. Meanwhile, Frank's ex-girlfriend Emily comes to visit, and realizing they still have feelings for each other, they decide to renew their relationship.
255	21	"Late Night Attraction"	February 11, 2003
Frank goes to Los Angeles for an interview at University of Southern California and Steven and Trishelle come along. While there, Frank becomes sexually frustrated around Trishelle. After he gets accepted to USC, he and Trishelle share a drunken kiss. He later feels upset about betraying Emily, and they break up when he realizes he is not ready for a long-distance relationship. Meanwhile, the group's assignment is to assist in an interview and photo shoot of models at the hotel for Stuff magazine.
256	22	"Singles Club"	February 18, 2003
Alton and Irulan try to make each other jealous by dating other people. Alton begins dating Denise, but it does not work out when she leaves Las Vegas to go to school in San Diego. Irulan dates Davin, but breaks up with him to prevent him from becoming too attached. Meanwhile, Arissa is thinking of breaking up with Dario in order for her to continue develop a greater sense of independence.
257	23	"Change of Plans"	February 25, 2003
Trishelle begins a romantic relationship with Brian, prompting jealousy in Steven, who realizes his true feelings for her. Meanwhile, the girls get jobs as cocktail waitresses at Skin, the new poolside bar that is opening soon.
258	24	"Broken Boundaries"	March 4, 2003
Alton and Irulan ponder their relationship, but they later have sex after Gabe refuses to get back together with her. Alton gets into a drunken a fight with one of Frank's friends; when Frank attempts to intervene, Alton feels that Frank did not support him and becomes even more angry. Meanwhile, Steven and Trishelle examine their relationship; while celebrating his birthday, the two affirm their love for one another and have sex again.
259	25	"Baggage Problems"	March 11, 2003
Arissa meets a new guy, Alex, who agrees to go out with her. However, when he does not show up, although initially upset, she later becomes thankful because she still has feelings for Dario. Meanwhile, while Brynn is suffering from anxiety and panic attacks, she later finds out that her mother has gone to rehab. Trishelle later tells Brynn about the problems with her mother, and the two become closer.
260	26	"All or Nothing"	March 18, 2003
Trishelle is upset when she learns that Steven does not want a relationship with her, as he only wants to be friends. Later, when he and Frank bring home girls from the club, she decides to stop having sex with Steven. Meanwhile, Irulan becomes angry at Alton when he gives a girl his phone number right in front of her. However, he later tells Irulan that he loves her and sees a future with her.
261	27	"Over It"	March 25, 2003
Arissa is informed by Irulan's visiting friend, Dina, that Dario got another girl pregnant. When Arissa calls him, he admits that he cheated, but denies the pregnancy, and she breaks up with him. Later, they talk once again and become civil with one another, but Arissa no longer wants a relationship with him. Meanwhile, Trishelle meets a new guy, Tyler, who she thinks she might be in love with, and Steven is happy that she is happy.
262	28	"Leaving Las Vegas"	April 1, 2003
As the roommates are prepared to go home, Arissa, who is scared she will revert to her old ways if she returns to Boston, is invited by her friend Michelle to live with her in Las Vegas. As the cast members leave the suite one by one, Alton reveals that he wants to maintain his relationship with Irulan, Brynn is going back to see Austin, Frank is moving to Los Angeles with Steven, and Trishelle also plans to leave her hometown.

== After filming ==
After the cast left the Real World suite, six of them, except for Trishelle, appeared to discuss their experiences both during and since their time on the show, 7 The Hard Way: The Real World Las Vegas Reunion which premiered on April 8, 2003, and was hosted by Hilarie Burton.

At the 2008 The Real World Awards Bash, Steven, Trishelle and Brynn took home the award for "Steamiest Scene". Irulan and Trishelle were also nominated for "Hottest Female", Alton for "Hottest Male", Brynn and Steven for "Best Fight", Alton and Irulan for "Favorite Love Story" (Steven and Trishelle were nominated in the same category as well).

Trishelle Cannatella appeared in the May 2002 Playboy magazine with other Real World alumni. Arissa Hill also posed for the magazine. In 2003 Trishelle was a cast member on The Surreal Life, and has played in the Lingerie Bowl, and in Hulk Hogan's Celebrity Championship Wrestling series as "The Red Hot Redneck". She also appeared on Fear Factor alongside Mike Mizanin, and at poker events. She married John Hensz in 2017. Katie Doyle from Road Rules: The Quest was in attendance. In 2024, Cannatella competed on the second season of The Traitors.

Steven Hill married designer Donna Katz in 2007 and welcomed his first son, Riley James David, in 2008. The couple divorced in 2010.

Irulan Wilson and Alton Williams' relationship continued for three years after the show. Williams later became a radio host, while Wilson appeared in various documentaries and TV specials like Kill Reality and Real Hot. She now works as a photographer in New York City.

In 2005, Trishelle Cannatella, Steven Hill, Irulan Wilson and Tonya Cooley (from The Real World: Chicago) appeared in the TV movie, The Scorned.

In 2007, the cast reunited to appear in Reunited: The Real World Las Vegas, a seven-episode spin-off reunion miniseries in which they lived in the same suite they filmed the original series in. The mini-series premiered on May 30, 2007, and concluded on July 11, 2007.

=== The Challenge ===
Cast member	Seasons of The Challenge	Other appearances
Arissa Hill	Battle of the Sexes 2	The Challenge: All Stars (season 1)
Frank Roessler	Battle of the Sexes 2, The Gauntlet III	—N/a
Trishelle Cannatella	The Gauntlet, The Inferno, Battle of the Seasons (2012), Rivals II	The Challenge: All Stars (season 1)
Brynn Smith	—N/a	—N/a
Alton Williams	The Gauntlet, The Gauntlet 2, The Inferno 3, Battle of the Seasons (2012)	The Challenge: All Stars (season 1)
Steven Hill	Battle of the Sexes 2	—N/a
Irulan Wilson	The Gauntlet	—N/a

== See also ==
- List of television shows set in Las Vegas
