= Demetrius Navarro =

American actor

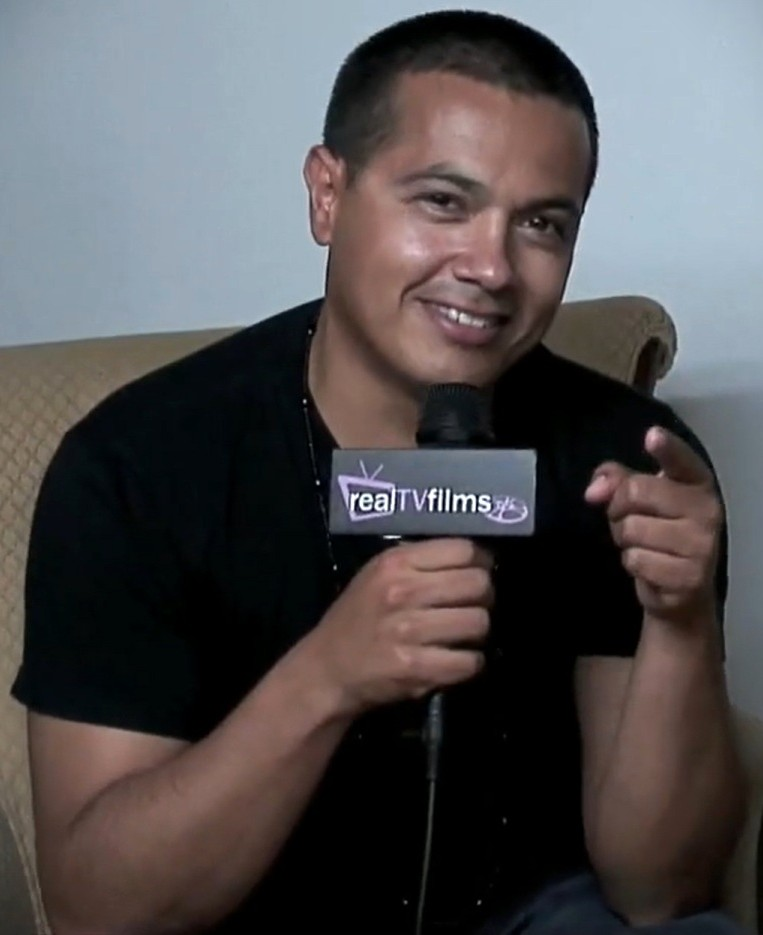
- Navarro in 2009
- Born: 1970 (age 54–55); Los Angeles, California
- Occupation(s): Actor, director
- Years active: 1988-present

Demetrius Navarro is an actor, writer and director as well as the CEO of D Street Films.

== Career ==
=== Actor ===
His first professional acting job was for Luis Valdez’s theater company, El Teatro Campesino. Navarro made his film debut in Friday. He then played lead roles in 187, opposite Samuel L. Jackson, Soldier Boyz, The Yard Sale and Runaways. He spent 11 seasons on ER as Morales, while, at the same time, starring on Telemundo’s sitcom Los Beltran.

He has also had guest starring roles on The O.C., CSI Miami, and NYPD Blue.

=== Writer and Director ===
Navarro has written and directed four movies: American Lowrider, Anything is Possible, American Justice (which he co-write with Jerry Bryant and Tommy Lister), and Gone Hollywood.

He also directed Lean like a Cholo, Put Your Locs On and Silent No More.

=== Producer ===
He produced Runaways, which was nominated for several awards, including the Los Angeles FirstGlance Film Festival for Best Feature in 2004, the Philadelphia FirstGlance Film Festival for Best Feature in 2005 and the Indie Gathering Film Festival for Best Feature in 2006.

Next, he produced and starred in Purple Heart..

He co-produced The Yard Sale, which won Best Picture at the San Diego Latino Film Festival, and The Little Match Makers, which won Best Picture at the San Diego Indie Fest in 2011.

== Awards ==
He was nominated for an ALMA Award in the Best Supporting Actor category in 2002. As part of the ensemble cast of ER, he won the Screen Actors Guild Award for Outstanding Performance by an Ensemble in a Drama Series.

Navarro is a 2014 Africa NAFCA nominate for Best Director in a Foreign Film. Two of his films, Silent No More and Anything is Possible, are nominees for Best Foreign Film.

== Current projects ==
Navarro is the CEO of D Street Films.
