= Freedom: First Resistance =

2000 video game

- Developer: Red Storm Entertainment
- Publisher: Red Storm Entertainment
- Platform: Microsoft Windows
- Release: NA: 12 December 2000; EU: 2001
- Genre: Action-adventure

Freedom: First Resistance is a third-person action-adventure video game for PC. The game was published by Red Storm Entertainment and released in the United States on 12 December 2000. The game is based on Anne McCaffrey's trilogy of novels titled the Catteni Series (also known as Freedom Series).

== Gameplay ==
Freedom: First Resistance is set on Earth in an alternative future where the Catteni alien race has invaded and occupied the planet, forcing most of humanity into labor camps. During gameplay, the player takes on the role of a female human named Angel Sanchez, voiced by Yeni Álvarez. Sanchez is the leader of a resistance party who attempts to end the alien's oppression.

The player's computer mouse is used to control the camera as well as which direction the character is facing, and players can freely switch between characters that join Sanchez's party.

== Reception ==
Reception

Aggregate score
Aggregator	Score
Metacritic	40/100

Review scores
Publication	Score
CNET Gamecenter	4/10
Computer Games Strategy Plus	1/5
Computer Gaming World	1/5
Game Informer	5.75/10
GameSpot	3.9/10
GameSpy	73%
GameZone	5.5/10
IGN	4.9/10
Next Generation	1/5
PC Gamer (US)	40%

Freedom: First Resistance received "generally unfavorable reviews" according to the review aggregation website Metacritic. GameSpot wrote in their summary of the game that "If the disappointing gameplay and the graphics and sound somehow aren't enough to turn you off to the game, Freedom has lots of smaller problems as well." IGN commented that the game had shortcomings, including glitches in stealth mode such as enemies detecting the character through walls, or conversely, not detecting the character at all. Further criticism in the review claimed that the combat engine functioned poorly and lacked player involvement. IGN went on to point out minor issues such as a "choppy frame rate," and incompatibility with various video and sound cards. Some of IGN's positive criticism noted the game's well-developed textures that lead to convincing outdoor environments as well as the game's tight animation sequences that were the result of nearly 700 motion captured animations. Samuel Bass of NextGen said: "With games like these, Earth deserves to be wiped out by aliens."
