= Michael Sempert =

American singer-songwriter

- Also known as: Mike Sempert
- Born: 1981 (age 44–45); Boston, Massachusetts, U.S.
- Genres: Rock music Jazz; Film score Electronic music
- Occupations: composer, songwriter
- Instruments: Piano, guitar, synthesizers, pedal steel guitar
- Years active: 2004–present
- Label: Velvet Blue Music
- Member of: Birds & Batteries
- Website: michaelsempertmusic.com

Michael Sempert (born 1981), also known as Mike Sempert, is an American singer-songwriter and film/tv music composer based in Los Angeles, California. He was signed to the record label Velvet Blue Music in 2014 and released his first solo album, Mid Dream, the same year. Sempert has composed music or written songs for multiple films and television shows including Grey's Anatomy, Bloodline, A Room Full of Nothing and Bixler High Private Eye. He is the founder of the San Francisco-based band Birds & Batteries. Sempert's original compositions have been licensed by ABC, Netflix, NBC and others for use in their television shows.

== Biography ==
=== Early life and education ===
Sempert was born in 1981, in Boston, Massachusetts. He attended and graduated from Brookline High School in 1999. Sempert studied jazz and classical piano throughout his childhood. In 2004, he graduated from Tufts University as well as New England Conservatory of Music where he majored in Peace and Justice Studies and Jazz Composition, respectively. During his early years, Sempert was influenced by the music of Talking Heads, Stevie Wonder Thomas Mapfumo, Tom Petty, Squeeze and Weather Report.

=== Career ===
Sempert started his professional music career in 2004. He formed the band, Birds & Batteries, as a sole member and recorded an album of demos called Nature vs. Nature. The demo collection was released as the album, Selections from Nature vs. Nature in 2005.

In early 2005, Sempert moved to San Francisco where he expanded Birds & Batteries and assembled a four-member performing band which included Brian Michelson (drums), Jill Heinke (bass) and Christopher Walsh (guitar). As the songwriter, lead-singer and multi-instrumentalist, Sempert wrote and produced four albums and two EPs for Birds & Batteries which were released between 2005 and 2012. During that time, the band toured United States extensively and performed at numerous festivals and concerts including South by Southwest, Noise Pop, 35 Denton, Mission Creek Festival, and Doe Bay Festival. The albums by Birds & Batteries were reviewed by NPR, The Fader, San Francisco Bay Guardian and Pitchfork.

Sempert moved to Los Angeles in 2013 and began composing music for films, television shows and commercials. He released his first solo album Mid Dream in 2014, on the label Velvet Blue Music. The single "Finest Line" from the album Mid Dream was featured in SyFy's television drama, Defiance in 2015. The same year, he released an album of instrumental electronic music under the moniker Volcanic Legacy titled Uncanny Valley. Sempert's second solo album, Tend the Flame, was released in 2016. The songs from the album were used in various television shows including Grey's Anatomy, Quantico, Heartbeat and Stitchers. Over the years, Sempert's compositions were featured in various television shows such as Kingdom, Bloodline, Gossip Girl and others. Between 2015 and 2019, Sempert composed music for the feature films Jaywalking, A Room Full of Nothing, Sex Weather, Roads to Olympia, Bixler High Private Eye and the short films Stock, Dynamite and A Seasonal Thing. His third solo album, Reunion of Sparks was released in early 2019.

== Filmography ==
As Songwriter
Year	Title	Song
2018	Grey's Anatomy	"Distance"
2018	The Fosters	"What I Want"
2018	Revenge	"Mid Dream"
2017	Kingdom	"The Weather"
2017	Bloodline	"For A Long Long Time"
2017	Quantico	"Distance"
2016	Heartbeat	"Distance"
2016	Stitchers	"Distance"
2015	The Missing Girl	"Finest Line"
2018	Revenge	"Mid Dream"
2014	Defiance	"Finest Line"
2010	Gossip Girl	"Lightning (UTNG Version)"

As Composer
Year	Title	Type
2020	Love in Dangerous Times	Feature film
2020	The Kid Who Only Hit Homers	Television film
2019	A Seasonal Thing	Short film
2019	Roads to Olympia	Feature film
2019	A Room Full of Nothing	Feature film
2018	Bixler High Private Eye	Television film
2018	Dynamite	Short film
2018	Stock	Short film
2018	Sex Weather	Feature film
2018	Jaywalking	Feature film
2018	Homestate	Feature film
2015	Hey	Short film

== Discography ==
Birds & Batteries Studio Albums
Year	Album	Type
2005	Selections from Nature vs. Nature	LP
2007	I'll Never Sleep Again	LP
2009	Up to No Good	EP
2010	Panorama	LP
2011	Unfold	EP
2012	Stray Light	LP

Solo Studio Albums
Year	Album	Type
2014	Mid Dream	LP
2014	Mid Dream Complete Sessions	LP
2016	Tend the Flame	LP
2019	Reunion of Sparks	LP

Volcanic Legacy Studio Albums
Year	Album	Type
2013	Stray Light Remixes	EP
2015	Uncanny Valley	LP
