= Steven Hill (model) =

American television personality

- Born: Steven Alfred Hill; San Marcos, Texas, United States
- Occupations: Reality television personality, model, guest speaker, author, actor
- Spouse: Donna Katz (m. 2007; div. 2010)
- Children: 1

Steven Alfred Hill is an American reality television personality, model, guest speaker, author, and occasional actor. Hill is best known as a cast member on the twelfth season of the MTV reality television show The Real World.

== Early life ==
Steven Hill was born in San Marcos, Texas, but was raised predominantly in Austin. At the age of 16, Hill left home and has since lived on his own. Before appearing on The Real World, Hill worked as a shirtless bartender at a gay bar, although he is straight. He also eventually worked Wal-Mart Distribution Center.

== Career ==
Hill appeared on the 12th season of the Real World reality series, The Real World: Las Vegas. After The Real World ended, Hill appeared in several subsequent MTV shows, including one season of the Real World/Road Rules Challenge and was a co-host of Say What? Karaoke for a season. He also took part in a reunion mini-season with his Real World: Las Vegas castmates called Reunited: The Real World Las Vegas.

== Personal life ==
In 2007, Hill was married to designer Donna Katz. They have one son Riley James David, born in April 2008. Hill and Katz divorced in 2010.

== Filmography ==
Year	Title	Role	Notes
2002-2003	The Real World: Las Vegas	Himself	Appeared in 28 episodes
2003	Passions	Assistant Cop	
2004-2005	Battle of the Sexes 2	Himself	Contestant
2005	Drake & Josh		
2005	The Scorned	Oliver	
2006	Drake and Josh Go Hollywood	MTV Host	
2006	Half & Half	Michael	
2010	Chico's Angels	Colton	
