= Kahhori =

Marvel Cinematic Universe original character

- Marvel Cinematic Universe character
- First appearance: Marvel Cinematic Universe: What If...? episode "What If... Kahhori Reshaped the World?" (December 27, 2023); Marvel Comics: Kahhori: Reshaper of Worlds (November 6, 2024)
- Created by: Ryan Little
- Voiced by: Devery Jacobs

In-universe information
- Species: Human
- Affiliation: Guardians of the Multiverse
- Family: Wáhta (younger brother)
- Origin: Haudenosaunee Confederacy
- Nationality: Mohawk

Kahhori is a character voiced by Devery Jacobs in the Marvel Cinematic Universe (MCU) media franchise. Depicted as a young Mohawk woman, Kahhori gains superhuman powers after falling into a lake imbued with the powers of an Infinity Stone. She uses her powers to free her land from Queen Isabella and her Conquistadores. She is later kidnapped by Doctor Strange Supreme and teams up with Captain Carter to defeat him. After joining Carter's newly reformed Guardians of the Multiverse, Kahhori helps search for the Watcher after he goes missing.

Kahhori appeared in the second and third seasons of the Disney+ animated series What If...? (2023, 2024), and later made her Marvel Comics debut in Kahhori: Reshaper of Worlds (November 6, 2024).

== Concept and creation ==
They collaborated with us on every layer of the story from the characters' names, personalities and costumes to the look of the civilization and the surrounding wilderness to make every facet of this episode the most accurate depiction possible.

— What If...? writer Ryan Little on working with the Kanien'kehá:ka to craft Kahhori's character and episode

In March 2023, Marvel Studios officially revealed the original Marvel Cinematic Universe (MCU) character Kahhori on their website, prior to the release of the second season of the Disney+ animated series What If...? (2023). She was announced to appear in an episode for the upcoming season, which would focus on the sovereign Haudenosaunee Confederacy and the Kanien'kehá:ka (also known as the Mohawk people). Episode director Bryan Andrews noted that when working on the first season, one of his first ideas was doing a First Nations centred episode which asked the question, "What if colonization failed because there were super beings already there?".

The episode, titled "What If... Kahhori Reshaped the World?" (2023), sees the Tesseract transform a lake into an outer space gateway, which leads Kahhori on a journey to discover her cosmic powers and recruit allies to help save her people. Andrews and What If...? writer Ryan Little worked for four years with members of the Mohawk Nation such as historian Doug George, who provided insight into the history of the Akwesasne region (part of present day Upstate New York), and Mohawk language expert Cecelia King, to create Kahhori's look and world to ensure the cultural authenticity of the episode.

Kahhori actress Devery Jacobs called the episode "a huge opportunity" for "language and cultural revitalization" and was empowered by the fact a studio such as Marvel took the care to introduce an authentic native superhero. The consultants found Kahhori's name, which means "she stirs the forest", from a 1952 manuscript containing a list of Mohawk names from Mohawk scholar Charles Cooke. Kahhori's name, along with others used in the episode, were written phonetically in the manuscript, which was retained for What If...? to better allow audiences to pronounce them, and thus do not include diacritical markings of the modern Mohawk language. The consultants also ensured the names used in the episodes were not currently in use, keeping with longhouse naming conventions that sees one name used at any given time until that person dies.

== Characterization ==
=== Portrayal and appearances ===
Devery Jacobs first voiced Kahhori in the Disney+ animated series What If...?. Jacobs auditioned for the part in August 2020 and, after being cast, improved upon her basic Mohawk language and learned how to speak it more fluently, given Mohawk is Kahhori's first language as she had not been influenced by Western culture. Jacobs portrays Bonnie in the Disney+ miniseries Echo (2024), which she called a "coincidence" that she was part of two Marvel Studios projects and noting the two characters were not related. On her character, Jacobs noted that "[Kahhori] is literally why I got into this industry, and why I wanted to become a storyteller", and added that, "it does something to you, when you see somebody from your community being able to rewrite history and can save the world, and save their community, and their culture. That was hugely empowering".

Following her introduction in What If...?, Kahhori made her Marvel Comics debut in the Marvel's Voices's one-shot spin-off comic Kahhori: Reshaper of Worlds (November 6, 2024). The comic serves as a continuation of Kahhori's story in the second season of What If...? where she pursues an evil version of Loki across the main Marvel Universe (Earth-616).

=== Powers and abilities ===
Kahhori's powers have been described as a "living conduit of cosmic power", which she gained from a lake imbued with the energy of the Tesseract. She has the ability to teleport, levitate extremely heavy objects and create strong force shields. In the finale of the third season of What If...? (2024), Kahhori takes the Watcher's oath and is briefly empowered with the abilities of the Watchers.

Kahhori's powers were compared to those of Carol Danvers / Captain Marvel, who also gained her abilities from the Tesseract. However, Comic Book Resources (CBR) writer Renaldo Matadeen felt that she was different from Danvers who "could fly through space and shoot out energy blasts" while Kahhori was "a veritable god as she embarks on a crusade for justice". Screen Rant writer Kai Young listed Kahhori as the eighth most powerful MCU character introduced in What If...?. In another article for the same publication, Young added that Kahhori's powers and storyline made her "one of the most significant original MCU characters".

== Fictional character biography ==
=== Fighting the Conquistadores ===
In an alternate reality to the Sacred Timeline, the Tesseract fell to the Haudenosaunee Confederacy. Several years later, Kahhori is born a Mohawk woman. Her tribe is attacked by the Conquistadores and to escape them, she and her brother, Wáhta, flee to Akwesasne. The two accidentally find a lake (imbued with the powers of the fallen Space Stone), which elders of their tribe referred to as a cursed, forbidden lake rumoured to have great power which drove the surrounding Mohawk nations into conflict. Trying to save her brother from the Conquistadores, Kahhori is shot and falls into the lake before being transported to an alternate world.

Kahhori is awoken by a former Mohawk villager, Atahraks, who welcomes her into the Sky World. She awakes healed, with unmitigated energy and new powers. Learning about her powers from the Sky World villagers, Kahhori learns that the portal in which bought them was above and too far to reach and go back home. Kahhori attempts to try reach the portal before joining the others on a hunt for Sky World Fruit which were atop creatures referred to as the Gakowaneh. Kahhori uses her telekinesis to get the fruit, impressing the Sky World villagers.

Unbeknownst to Kahhori, the Conquistadores had followed Kahhori into the lake. They attack the Sky World villagers before being defeated by Kahhori. She berates the Sky World villagers for getting too comfortable and leaving her and her people to fend for themselves. She brings the portal down to them, and invites them to be brave and join her in defeating the Conquistadores. After walking through the portal, Kahhori fights the Conquistadores who are leaving on ships with enslaved members of her village. She is joined by Atahraks and the Sky World villagers who defeat the Conquistadores and free Wáhta and the Mohawk people. Kahhori goes to the Alcázar of Segovia where she approaches the Conquistadores' leader, Queen Isabella, with the Sky World villagers. She uses her powers to intimidate the queen into making peace with the Mohawk people. Kahhori is then approached by Doctor Strange Supreme who congratulates her and notes that he has been looking for her.

=== Teaming up with Captain Carter ===
Sometime later, Kahhori is on the run from Doctor Strange Supreme who is trying to sacrifice her and other righteous heroes and universe killers to the Forge which would revive his universe. She escapes to a universe where HYDRA won World War II and is soon pursued by Captain Peggy Carter, Strange's former teammate, who is unaware of his plans. After telling her the truth, Carter flees with Kahhori with Strange pursuing the two. They free Strange's universe killers including Infinity Killmonger and Zombie Wanda Maximoff among others. Kahhori joins Carter in a fight against Strange, using Mjolnir and the mystical Ten Rings. Strange eventually chooses to sacrifice himself to destroy the Forge. In the process, his universe is restored and Kahhori is sent back to her own universe by the Watcher.

After being sent home to her universe, Kahhori has a run in with an evil Frost Giant Loki variant who steals a powerful crown, one of the Sky World's relics. She pursues him through various timelines including Earth-616 where she encounters Echo, Daredevil and Moon Knight. After defeating Loki, she sends him to the Planet of Lost Souls.

=== Searching for the Watcher ===
Sometime later, Kahhori joins Captain Carter's newly formed Guardians of the Multiverse consisting of herself, Carter, Storm the Goddess of Thunder, and Byrdie the Duck. In the midst of a mission on Earth-625 defeating the Champion of Hydra, the team find three Observational Plane shards fallen from the sky, deducing that the Watcher is missing and may be in trouble. After several unsuccessful attempts to travel to the fifth dimension, Kahhori suggests recruiting Infinity Ultron to help. After Carter leaves solo to pursue the Watcher, Kahhori and the remaining Guardians track down Ultron to find her. Ultron agrees to help them and they break into the fifth dimension and start a fight against the Watchers, led by the Eminence, who have imprisoned the Watcher (for constantly interfering) and Carter. Ultron sacrifices his life so the Guardians can escape with them. While coming up with an idea to send the other Watchers to Doctor Strange Supreme's newly restored universe where he has complete control, the team is attacked again and crash-land on a nearby planet. Kahhori accepts the power of a Watcher and uses her new powers to help defeat the other Watchers. The team is saved by Carter who sacrifices her life and transports everyone to Strange's universe where the other Watchers lose their powers. Afterwards, Kahhori reminisces on Carter's sacrifice.

== Alternate versions ==
Alternate versions of Kahhori appear in alternate realities of the MCU multiverse.

=== What If...? ===
In alternate universes, Kahhori has donned several mantles and identifies including Captain America, Apocalypse, Cloak, and is also a member of the X-Men.

== Reception ==
=== Critical response ===
Inverse writer Dais Johnston praised the Indigenous representation Kahhori symbolised for the MCU stating that she felt the "franchise needs some fresh blood". She added that while Kahhori "may not exist in the main timeline at this point, she's broken new ground for the MCU". Collider writer Kelcie Mattson praised Kahhori's inclusion in What If...?, feeling that she was the best part of the series' second season. The Mary Sue writer Rachel Ulatowski also praised Kahhori's representation as an Indigenous superhero, stating that "Jacobs was an excellent choice to voice Kahhori" and stated that the show did not "sugarcoat colonization [which] makes Kahhori a truly powerful and inspiring hero".

=== Accolades ===
Jacobs' performance as Kahhori in "What If... Kahhori Reshaped the World?" was an honorable mention for TVLine Performer of the Week for the week ending December 30, 2023, with Matt Webb Mitovich stating Jacobs "instantly engaged viewers" to Kahhori, giving the character "both a headstrong resolve and an understandable curiosity" about her new powers and "imbued the character with a commanding confidence".

== Merchandise ==
A Funko soda of Kahhori was released in mid-2023 prior to the character's appearance in What If...?. A standard Funko Pop! was also released in 2024.

== See also ==
- Characters of the Marvel Cinematic Universe
