= Get Blake! =

Animated television show

- Genre: Comedy; Science fiction
- Created by: Antoine Guilbaud
- Developed by: Camille Oesch; Reid Harrison; Dominic Webber; Stéphane Berry
- Directed by: Daniel Klein; Pascal Jardin
- Voices of: Robbie Daymond; Spike Spencer; Kevin Glikmann; John Fisher; Danny Katiana; Faruk T. Jenkins; Katie Leigh
- Theme music composer: Jean-Philippe Verdin
- Opening theme: "Get Blake! Theme", performed by Robbie Daymond
- Ending theme: "Get Blake! Theme" (instrumental)
- Composers: Norbert Gilbert; Yellowshark Music
- Country of origin: France
- Original languages: English; French
- No. of seasons: 1
- No. of episodes: 26 (50 segments)

Production
- Executive producers: Antoine Guilbaud; Kaz; Vincent Chalvon-Demersay; David Michel; Eryk Casemiro; Jennifer McCann; Mélanie Van Hooren; Ambroise Delorme; Derek Dressler
- Producers: Claude Coyaut; Gwenaëlle Dupré; Bastien Fauré; For Inspidea: Andrew Ooi; C.J. See
- Editors: Florence Aillerie; Fiona Couturier
- Running time: 23 minutes (11 minutes per segment)
- Production companies: Marathon Media; Zodiak Kids

Original release
- Network: Nickelodeon; Gulli
- Release: March 1 – October 29, 2015

Get Blake! (French: Objectif Blake!) is a French animated television series created by Antoine Guilbaud and produced by Marathon Media and Zodiak Kids, with the participation of Nickelodeon, Gulli and CNC. It centers on the adventures of Blake, a future space ranger, and his best friend Mitch, as they try to escape from the Squaliens, who are Jerome, Maxus, and Leonard. The show aired on both Gulli and Nickelodeon in France.

According to Marathon Media, the show was its first "broad comedy series" following "years of doing light-hearted action such as Totally Spies! or Martin Mystery." 26 episodes were produced.

== Plot ==
The series tracks the exploits of Blake Myers, an adventurous young teenage boy passionate about fantasy films and new technology. He is destined to one day protect humanity from alien squirrels called "Squaliens". Three highly trained Squaliens commanded by the Squalien General, Leonard, Maxus and Jerome, however, are sent back in time to catch Blake and prevent him from fulfilling this destiny by all means, who fights against them with the assistance of his best friend Mitch.

== Characters ==
- Blake Myers (Julien Crampon in French and Robbie Daymond in English) — Blake is a 13-year-old boy who dreams to become a space ranger and is a fan of extreme sports. He is skilled at parkour, which helps in escaping the Squaliens. He has a strong lack of sympathy for the self-centered and conceited Leonard and often uses questionable methods to defeat him, which does not please the latter at all.
- Mitch de la Cruz (Emmanuel Garijo in French and Spike Spencer in English) — Blake's Mexican American best friend who cherishes nothing more than their friendship and gets a little jealous whenever Blake's attention is diverted to someone else (but he tries hard not to show it or his envy at his fate). Mitch is a genius — but he sometimes struggles to stay focused. He loves inventing gadgets to help his best friend fight the Squaliens. If the Squaliens want to catch Blake, they'll have to face Mitch first!
- Maxus (Marital Le Minoux in French and John Fisher in English) — The bossiest, shortest and sometimes-greediest of the Squalien trio, Jerome's older brother and the General's nephew. At first glance, Maxus may seem like a fool, but if you scratch past the surface, you'll find a true technological genius. The General considers him as the "team leader", even though it's actually Leonard; Maxus also seems to have tried and claim Leonard's title as leader several times.
- Jerome (Emmanuel Garijo in French and Danny Katiana in English) — The jovial, carefree, absent-minded, polite, helpful and easygoing dimwit of the Squalien trio who is Maxus' younger brother and the General's nephew. Jerome does his best not to offend anyone. He often falls in love with inanimate objects (dolls, stuffed animals, chess pieces, even bedside lamps or trash cans), and is mocked for being too kind or for his somewhat silly attitude. The General considers him the "heart"; indeed, Jerome is often the buffer between Leonard and Maxus. When he makes long speeches, his voice changes slightly.
- Leonard (Jérémy Prévost in French and Kevin Glikmann in English) — The jaded genius and self-appointed leader of the Squalien trio with only one goal in mind: to capture Blake Myers at all costs before he becomes a space ranger. He is always the one who invents the gadgets necessary for their missions. Leonard sees himself as a great evil genius who has the most knowledge about Earth and its humans; solitary and ingenious, he would surely have already caught Blake a long time ago if he were not accompanied by the two worst teammates imaginable: Maxus and Jerome, the General's idiotic and clumsy nephews. Leonard gradually turns out to be an expert in prestidigitation, and so at the end of the series, he does not accompany the General and his nephews who thought they had taken him once they're sent back into space, instead managing to escape and stay on Earth to capture Blake all by himself as he follows the boy home, ending the show on a cliffhanger.
- Squalien General (Philippe Catoire in French and Kevin Glikmann in English) — The Squaliens' commander who sent Leonard, Jerome and Maxus from the future to apprehend Blake. Although Leonard is the ace of the team, as Maxus and Jerome's uncle, he mostly takes their side and doubts Leonard, considers him the "weak link" of the three. He always finds his nephews Maxus and Jerome the best because Leonard is not part of his family, and when they come up with a plan, he chooses his nephews' instead of the old method that Leonard loves: his trusty burlap sack. When Leonard goes alone, or does something that, most of the time, he should do as a team, the General comes to criticize what he does, and he always blames Leonard when the mission fails. He calls himself the team's "strongman".
- Zorka (Emmanuel Curtil in French and Danny Katiana in English) — The resident Russian contractor, Roy's guardian, and Blake's neighbor. He always comes to help him when he's in need. He is the only character in the series who mentions his racial origins.
- Skye Gunderson (Audrey Sablé in French and Katie Leigh in English) — Blake's neighbor, as well as his love interest. She is strong, compassionate, a bit of a tomboy, and a budding photographer. She also volunteers as a dental nurse helping her father.
- Roy Cronk (Gérard Surugue in French and Faruk T. Jenkins in English) — The obnoxiously cranky neighbor whose nerves Blake and Mitch often get on, and Zorka's friend. He takes great pleasure in criticizing those around him, and usually gets around in a wheelchair, which he calls Miss Daisy, only occasionally walking.
- Dale Myers (Mark Lesser in French and Derek Dressler in English) — Blake's father, and co-owner of the family travel business, "Let's Travel!".
- Darla Myers (Alexandra Garijo in French and Tarah Consoli in English) — Blake's mother, and co-owner of "Let's Travel!".
- Rodrigo de la Cruz — Mitch's father who is also a skilled inventor.
- Carmen de la Cruz (Fily Keita in French and Yeni Álvarez in English) — Mitch's mother who organizes the town's block parties.
- Dr. Björn Gunderson (Jérôme Pauwels in French) — Skye's father of Swedish descent, who is the resident dentist and, like her, has gap teeth. He enjoys fixing other people's teeth and hates candy. This doesn't stop him from distributing candy to children in order to keep his business afloat.
- Isabelle Gunderson — Skye's mother.
- Sunshine Gunderson — Skye's baby sister.
- Fast Eddy — Zorka's pet miniature bull terrier that keeps protecting his lawn.
- Wanda — A lithe and agile weasel, and a space ranger. Very late in the series, she joins Blake, and finding potential in his skills, trains him to help him become an effective space ranger and fights Leonard because cheated during the traditional rope fight.

== Episodes ==
No.	Title	Written by	Storyboarded by	Original release date	U.S. air date
1a	"Get Shrunk!" "(Objectif Mini !)"	Dani Vetere	Christophe Ollivier-Noborio	March 1, 2015	TBA
The Squaliens shrink Blake and Mitch.
1b	"Get Inked!" "(Objectif Cerveau !)"	Paul Grinberg	Daniel Klein	March 2, 2015	TBA
Leonard invents a device which switches bodies. When Blake and Mitch visit an aquarium, Blake ends up getting his body switched with an octopus while Mitch's is switched with a penguin. Both boys have to go after the creatures in their bodies, with the boys in the new bodies.
2a	"Get Pizza!" "(Objectif Pizza !)"	Derek Dressler	Olivier Poirette	March 3, 2015	May 3, 2016
Blake's mom makes her own pizza which goes viral, earning income for Blake and Mitch. Even the Squaliens eventually get addicted to the pizza, but likewise Blake's mom becomes addicted to making pizza.
2b	"Get Prehistoric!" "(Objectif Préhistoire !)"	Eric Rivera	Sandrine Sekulak	March 4, 2015	May 4, 2016
While searching for a birthday present for Skye, the Squaliens leave a bicycle for Blake, which ends up transporting him and Mitch to the Stone Age.
3a	"Get Old!" "(Objectif Papy !)"	May Chan	Christophe Ollivier-Noborio	March 5, 2015	April 27, 2016
The Squaliens turn Blake and Mitch into senior citizens so that Blake won't be fit to go into space.
3b	"Get Frozen!" "(Objectif Fixé !)"	Derek Dressler	Joan Gouviac	March 8, 2015	April 27, 2016
Leonard paralyses Blake with a freeze ray, which Jerome accidentally paralyses Leonard with. The two are then mistaken for statues and left at a lawn. Mitch has to team up with the dimwitted Jerome to save them both.
4a	"Get Amnesia!" "(Objectif Amnésique !)"	Patrick Andrew O'Connor	Pascal Ropars	March 10, 2015	May 11, 2016
Blake and Leonard lose their memory and are convinced they're best friends.
4b	"Get Fishin'!" "(Objectif Star !)"	Patrick Andrew O'Connor	Daniel Klein	March 11, 2015	May 11, 2016
Blake must master playing a wooden fish for a battle-of-the-bands performance with Skye.
5a	"Get Dogged!" "(Objectif Canin !)"	Cindy Morrow	Joan Gouviac	March 12, 2015	April 20, 2016
The Squaliens disguise themselves as a dog which becomes Blake's new best friend.
5b	"Get Commercial!" "(Objectif Pub !)"	Eric Rivera	Yves Bigerel	March 13, 2015	April 20, 2016
The Squaliens disguise themselves to ruin a new commercial Blake filmed to replace one from his childhood.
6a	"Get Well!" "(Objectif Papaye !)"	Patrick Andrew O'Connor	Pascal Ropars	March 16, 2015	November 6, 2016
Mitch, Jerome and Maxus contract an illness which gives them hallucinations, leaving Blake and Leonard to face each other alone.
6b	"Get Boots!" "(Objectif Sabotage !)"	Eric Rivera	Jean Gouviac	March 17, 2015	November 20, 2016
Both Blake and the Squalien General yearn for the same pair of indestructible boots. Since the General commanded the Squaliens to get the boots for him before getting Blake, the trio must resist fighting Blake until then.
7a	"Get Invisible!" "(Objectif Invisible !)"	Sindy Spackman	Christophe Ollivier-Noborio	March 18, 2015	TBA
Blake gets back at the Squaliens after he uses an invisibility ring they lose.
7b	"Get Hairy!" "(Objectif Poliu !)"	Patrick Andrew O'Connor	Pascal Ropars	March 19, 2015	May 18, 2016
After Blake and Mitch use Mitch's dad's hair growth solution to watch a movie, they have hair growing all over their bodies.
8a	"Get Elected!" "(Objectif Élection !)"	Eric Rivera	Daniel Klein	March 20, 2015	TBA
Roy holds an election against Mitch's mom so that he can ruin Blake's life. Leonard also attempts to brainwash Roy to increase his chances of getting elected.
8b	"Get Toothy!" "(Objectif Quenottes !)"	Dave Lewman	Joan Gouviac	March 23, 2015	December 18, 2016
Dr. Gunderson entrusts Blake to perform for kids as his mascot, Mr. Toothy, while he searches for a missing chameleon with the other Gundersons.
9a	"Get Squirrels!" "(Objectif Écureuil !)"	Reid Harrison	Pascal Ropars	March 24, 2015	May 18, 2016
Leonard brainwashes Earth squirrels to do his bidding of getting Blake.
9b	"Get Terrestrial!" "(Objectif Alien !)"	Eric Rivera	Daniel Klein	March 25, 2015	December 18, 2016
The Squaliens abduct a baby halo-wearing alien to help them get Blake, but it ends up with him and he and Mitch end up raising it.
10a	"Get Peaceful!" "(Objectif Écolo !)"	Patrick Andrew O'Connor	Christophe Ollivier-Noborio	March 26, 2015	TBA
Leonard turns Blake into a hippie so he won't defeat the Squaliens in the future.
10b	"Get Hurtin'!" "(Objectif Bobo !)"	Patrick Andrew O'Connor	Joan Gouviac	March 27, 2015	TBA
Leonard synchronizes his nervous system with Blake so either can feel any pain the other has.
11a	"Get Sleep!" "(Objectif Dodo !)"	May Chan	Christophe Ollivier-Noborio	September 8, 2015	November 20, 2016
The Squaliens intend to put Blake in a deep sleep, but their sleep powder ends up on Roy. Blake and Mitch help the asleep Roy on his date while the Squaliens continue trying to put Blake to sleep.
11b	"Get Surprised!" "(Objectif Surprise !)"	Eric Rivera	Daniel Klein	September 10, 2015	TBA
On Blake's birthday, Leonard abducts him whilst gathering everyone else at a birthday party for him, but Mitch smells a rat.
12a	"Get Wet!" "(Objectif Arrosage !)"	Patrick Andrew O'Connor	Anthony Pascal	September 11, 2015	TBA
12b	"Get Sentient!" "(Objectif Robots !)"	Eric Rivera	Olivier Derynck	September 14, 2015	TBA
13a	"Get Snatched!" "(Objectif Voisins !)"	Chris Savino	Christophe Ollivier-Noborio	September 15, 2015	TBA
13b	"Get Grounded!" "(Objectif Puni !)"	Eric Rivera	Anthony Pascal	September 16, 2015	TBA
14a	"Get Blakes!" "(Objectif Clones !)"	May Chan	Miguel Rodrigues	September 17, 2015	TBA
14b	"Get Trapped!" "(Objectif Guet-Apens !)"	David Lewman	Joan Gouviac	September 18, 2015	TBA
15a	"Get Dreamin'!" "(Objectif Rêve !)"	Eric Rivera	Olivier Derynck	September 21, 2015	TBA
15b	"Get Reception!" "(Objectif Crypté !)"	Derek Dressler	Ronan Le Brun	September 22, 2015	TBA
16a	"Get Surrendered!" "(Objectif Amnistie !)"	Derek Dressler	Joan Gouviac	September 23, 2015	May 25, 2016
When Leonard is shocked that Blake has won in the future, he tells Maxus and Jermone to surrender Blake's past self that they fail to get.
16b	"Get Late!" "(Objectif Chrono !)"	Eric Rivera	Daniel Klein	September 24, 2015	May 25, 2016
17a	"Get Morphed!" "(Objectif Transfo !)"	Patrick Andrew O'Connor	Fabien Branily	September 25, 2015	TBA
After failing to get Blake, the General decides to replace his nephews with a Squalien bot that can morph into anything.
17b	"Get Tough!" "(Objectif Doudou !)"	David Lewman	Ronan Le Brun	September 28, 2015	TBA
18a	"Get Stuck!" "(Objectif Glu !)"	May Chan	Richard Méril	September 29, 2015	TBA
18b	"Get Baking!" "(Objectif Gâteau !)"	Patrick Andrew O'Connor	Joan Gouviac	September 30, 2015	TBA
19a	"Get Treasure!" "(Objectif Trésor !)"	David Lewman	Ronan Le Brun	October 1, 2015	TBA
19b	"Get Weather!" "(Objectif Météo !)"	David Lewman	Joan Gouviac	October 2, 2015	TBA
20a	"Get Weasel!" "(Objectif Fouine !)"	Eric Rivera	Kévin Audi-Grivetta	October 5, 2015	TBA
20b	"Get Mommy!" "(Objectif Maman !)"	Derek Dressler	Fabien Brandily	October 6, 2015	TBA
21a	"Get Cratered!" "(Objectif Astéroïde !)"	Derek Dressler	Yves Bigerel	October 7, 2015	TBA
21b	"Get Non-Existent!" "(Objectif Passé !)"	David Lewman	Richard Méril	October 8, 2015	TBA
22a	"Get Racing!" "(Objectif Turbo !)"	Eric Rivera	Joan Gouviac	October 9, 2015	TBA
22b	"Get Piratical!" "(Objectif Pirate !)"	David Lewman	Vincent Fouache	October 12, 2015	TBA
23a	"Get Western!" "(Objectif Western !)"	Chris Savino	Boris Guilloteau	October 13, 2015	TBA
23b	"Get Medieval!" "(Objectif Moyen Âge !)"	David Lewman	Paul-Henri Ferrant	October 14, 2015	TBA
Blake and Mitch play jousting, only to be joined in by the Squaliens.
24a	"Get Zombies!" "(Objectif Zombies !)"	Brad Birch	Daniel Klein	October 26, 2015	November 6, 2016
Since Blake and Mitch have been struggling to win in a video game, Leonard intends to trap them in it, only to bring the zombies from the game to life.
24b	"Get Spooked!" "(Objectif Fantôme !)"	Cindy Morrow	Pascal Ropars	October 27, 2015	TBA
Skye tells Blake and Mitch a ghost story that scares them and the Squaliens.
25	"Get Skye!" "(Objectif Skye !)"	Derek Dressler	Pascal Ropars Joan Gouviac	October 28, 2015	TBA
The Squaliens forge a letter from Skye to lure Blake. They freeze Skye and hold her hostage after their plan fails, prompting Blake to go after them to rescue his Valentine.
26	"Got Blake!" "(Objectif Atteint !)"	Derek Dressler	Kévin Audi-Grivetta	October 30, 2015	TBA

== Production ==
The series was first announced in 2012 as being titled Blake and the Aliens, with Reid Harrison and Eric Gosselet originally attached to write and direct respectively, and was described as having a "board-driven" approach similar to SpongeBob SquarePants. In 2014, it was retitled as Get Blake! with Daniel Klein taking over as director.

The series' animation was provided by Malaysian animation studio Inspidea.

== Broadcast ==
Get Blake! was originally scheduled to premiere on Nickelodeon in the United States in April 2015, but instead began to air on Nicktoons on April 20, 2016. The series premiered on Nickelodeon in Africa on April 6 but later moved to Nicktoons in Africa from November 2 for new episodes and on Nickelodeon in Australia and New Zealand on May 17. In Arabia, it is broadcast on both Nickelodeon and Nicktoons. It also airs on ABC Me in Australia.
