= Los Beltrán =

Television series

- Genre: Sitcom
- Created by: Carlos R. Bermudez; Mike Millian
- Starring: Emiliano Díez; Margarita Coego; Demetrius Navarro; Yeni Álvarez; Gabriel Romero; James C. Leary
- Country of origin: United States
- Original language: Spanish
- No. of seasons: 2
- No. of episodes: 44?

Production
- Executive producers: Carlos R. Bermudez; Mike Millian
- Running time: 30 minutes
- Production companies: Spanglish Entertainment (season 1); GaLAn Entertainment; Si Como No... Productions (season 2); Columbia TriStar Television

Original release
- Network: Telemundo
- Release: October 17, 1999 – 2001

Los Beltrán (transl. The Beltrans) is a Spanish-language American television sitcom that aired on the U.S.-based network Telemundo from October 17, 1999 to 2001. Although canceled after two seasons, Los Beltrán received a number of media awards. Los Beltrán was the first sitcom in two decades to deal with the Cuban American experience (following the PBS bilingual sitcom ¿Qué Pasa, USA?, which aired from 1977 to 1980) and the first-ever Spanish-language entertainment series to feature sympathetic gay characters as regulars.

== Plot ==
The series is based broadly on the 1970s American sitcom All in the Family, by Norman Lear, and on its 1960s British antecedent, Till Death Us Do Part. The lead character, Manny Beltrán (Emiliano Díez), is an ultraconservative Cuban exile who owned a small bodega (neighborhood market) in southern California. Manny is comically obsessed with money, and with reason: he is financially supporting not only his wife Letti (Margarita Coego) and law-student daughter Anita (played by Yeni Álvarez), but also his daughter's militantly liberal husband, Miguel Perez (Demetrius Navarro), a Chicano art student who is constantly challenging his father-in-law's prejudices and politics, while living under Manny's roof.

Unlike the families of Archie Bunker and Alf Garnett, however, the Beltráns in the first episode are moving up from their working-class digs to a nice, middle-class duplex in Burbank, which they've bought thanks to some lottery winnings. Upon moving in, they discover that their next-door neighbors (and holdover tenants) are a homosexual couple: a Spanish physician, Fernandito Salazar (Gabriel Romero), and his American boyfriend, Kevin Lynch (James C. Leary). This sets up a number of plot lines through the course of the series, much as did the Jeffersons moving in next door to the Bunkers in the early days of All in the Family.

Two particular episodes, focused on Fernandito and Kevin, got the series noticed by some English-language media. In the first season, Fernandito receives an unexpected visit from his father, a Spanish general (who resembles the late caudillo Francisco Franco), and in the end comes out to the father as gay. In the second season, Fernandito and Kevin have a commitment ceremony—shortly after Californians in real life had voted on, and passed into law, the anti-gay-marriage Proposition 22. This was the first same-sex wedding ceremony ever shown on a Spanish-language television series.

== Cast ==
- Emiliano Díez as Manny Beltrán
- Margarita Coego as Letti Beltrán
- Demetrius Navarro as Miguel Perez
- Yeni Álvarez as Anita
- Gabriel Romero as Fernandito Salazar
- James C. Leary as Kevin Lynch

== Episodes ==
=== Season 1 (1999–2000) ===
No. overall	No. in season	Title	Directed by	Written by	Original release date
1	1	"Pilot"	Unknown	Unknown	October 17, 1999
2	2	"Here Comes the Pride"	Unknown	Miguel Milagros & Carlos R. Bermudez	October 24, 1999
3	3	"Señor Wonderful"	Unknown	Joe Menendez	October 31, 1999
4	4	"Sleepless in Burbank"	Unknown	Mady Julian	November 7, 1999
5	5	"A Curse on This House"	Unknown	Unknown	November 14, 1999
6	6	"Vote Your Conscience"	Unknown	Unknown	November 21, 1999
7	7	"Armor Al Fresco"	Unknown	Unknown	November 28, 1999
8	8	"Beltrán vs. Beltrán"	Unknown	Unknown	January 9, 2000
9	9	"Anita's Dilemma"	Unknown	Unknown	January 16, 2000
10	10	"Manny Checks Out"	Unknown	Unknown	January 23, 2000
11	11	"Our Lady of Lankershim"	Unknown	Unknown	February 6, 2000
12	12	"Mario/Maria"	Unknown	Unknown	February 13, 2000
13	13	"Manny's Big Move: Part 1"	Unknown	Beth Dolan & Luis Remesar	February 20, 2000
14	14	"Manny's Big Move: Part 2"	Unknown	Unknown	February 27, 2000
15	15	"Letti's Dream"	Unknown	Unknown	April 9, 2000
16	16	"And What You?"	Unknown	Unknown	April 16, 2000
17	17	"Bring On the Winos"	Unknown	Unknown	April 23, 2000
18	18	"The Revelation of Fernandito"	Unknown	Unknown	May 7, 2000
19	19	"One, Two, Three, Fore!"	Unknown	Unknown	May 14, 2000
20	20	"Ashes to Ashes"	Unknown	Unknown	May 21, 2000
21	21	"56 Chevy"	Unknown	Carlos R. Bermudez & Mike Milligan	May 28, 2000
22	22	"The Visit of Victoria"	Unknown	Unknown	July 9, 2000

=== Season 2 ===
No. overall	No. in season	Title	Directed by	Written by	Original release date
23	1	TBA	TBD	TBD	2000

== Awards and recognition ==
Los Beltrán received the 2001 Imagen Foundation Award for Best Comedy Series and the 2001 ALMA Award from the National Council of La Raza for Best Spanish Language Comedy Series. It was nominated for two GLAAD Media Awards, the first Spanish-language program so honored by the Gay and Lesbian Alliance Against Defamation.
