= Yeni Álvarez =

American actress

- Álvarez in 2026
- Born: Cuba
- Occupation: Actress
- Years active: 2000–present
- Spouse: Mark DeCarlo (m. 2012)

Yeni Álvarez is a Cuban-born American actress. She is best known for her role as Anita in the sitcom Los Beltrán.

== Personal life ==
Álvarez was born in Cuba, and immigrated with her family to America, specifically Miami, Florida, when she was ten. She married actor Mark DeCarlo on November 24, 2012.

== Filmography ==
=== Television ===
| Year | Title | Role | Notes |
|---|---|---|---|
| 1999–2001 | Los Beltrán | Anita Beltrán | Main cast (45 episodes) |
| 2001 | Resurrection Blvd. | Tiffany | Episode: "A Puro Dolor" |
| 2003 | Line of Fire | Juana Contrera | Episode: "This Land is Your Land" |
| 2004 | Static Shock | Aquamaria (voice) | Episode: "Wet and Wild" |
| 2004 | Judging Amy | Officer Young | Episode: "My Little Runaway" |
| 2005 | Without a Trace | Sophia | Episode: "Manhunt" |
| 2005 | Summerland | Paramedic | Episode: "Mr. and Mrs. Who" |
| 2005 | Crossing Jordan | Parademic | Episode: "Forget Me Not" |
| 2005 | Criminal Minds | Aide | Episode: "Broken Mirror" |
| 2010 | Glenn Martin, DDS | Mercedes (voice) | Episode: "Courtney's Pony" |
| 2011 | Ben 10: Ultimate Alien | Dr. Borges (voice) | Episode: "The Ultimate Sacrifice" |
| 2015 | Get Blake! | Carmen de la Cruz (voice) | 2 episodes |

=== Film ===
| Year | Title | Role | Notes |
|---|---|---|---|
| 2014 | Monster High: Frights, Camera, Action! | Viperine Gorgon, Scary Stone (voice) | Direct-to-video |

=== Video games ===
| Year | Title | Role | Notes |
|---|---|---|---|
| 2000 | Freedom: First Resistance | Angel Sanchez | |
| 2005 | Total Overdose | Angel, Hooker | |
| 2013 | Lego Marvel Super Heroes | Black Widow, Mystique, Jean Grey / Dark Phoenix | |
| 2014 | The Lego Movie Videogame | Wyldstyle | |
| 2015 | Heroes of the Storm | Rosa Morales | |
