= Devery Jacobs =

Canadian First Nations actress (born 1993)

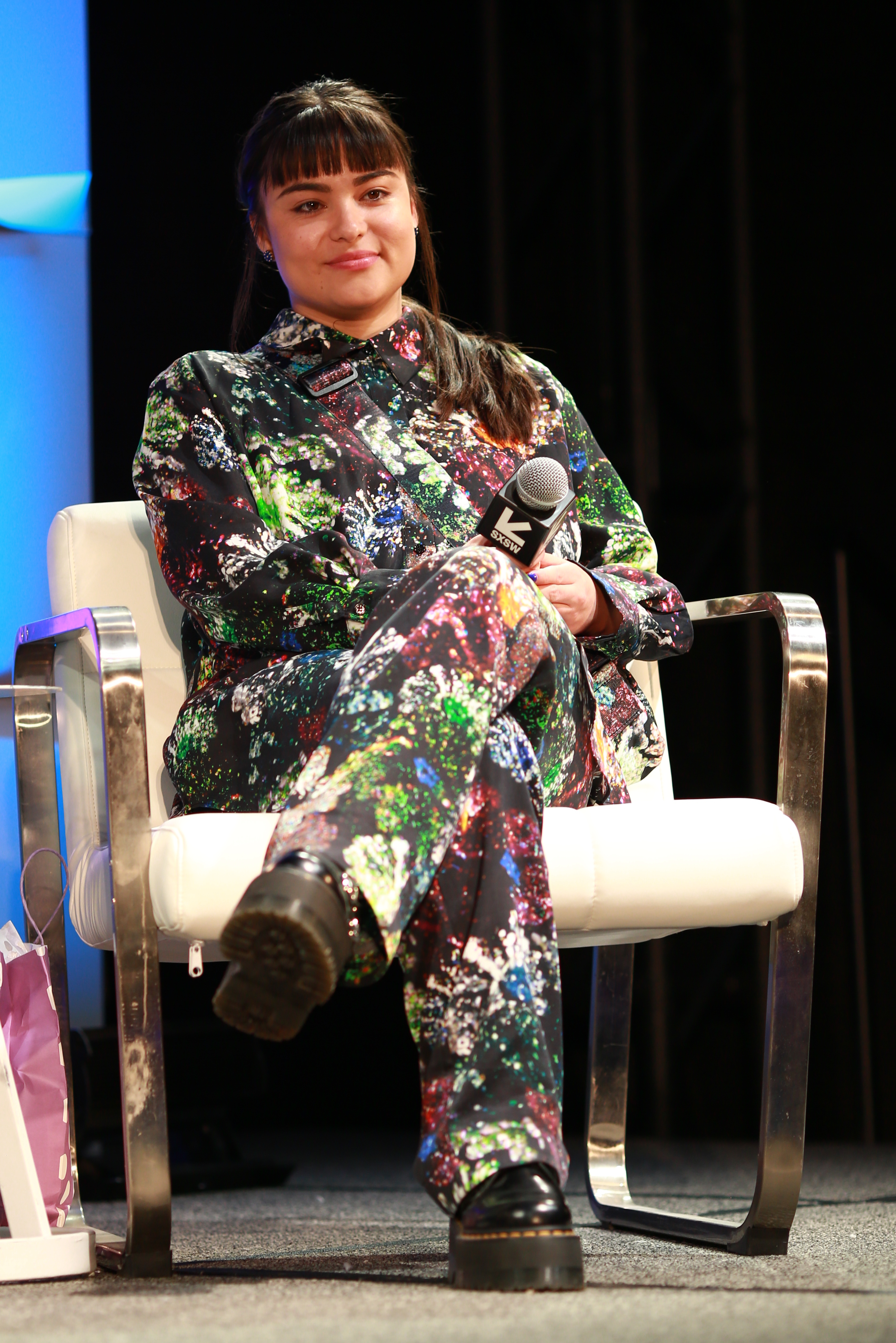
- Jacobs at SXSW 2024
- Born: August 8, 1993 (age 33); Kahnawake, Quebec, Canada
- Other name: Kawennáhere Devery Jacobs
- Occupation: Actress
- Years active: 2007–present
- Known for: Rhymes for Young Ghouls, Mohawk Girls, American Gods, The Order, Reservation Dogs

Kawennáhere Devery Jacobs (born August 8, 1993) is a Canadian Mohawk actress. For her performance in Rhymes for Young Ghouls (2013), she garnered a Canadian Screen Awards nomination for Best Actress. In 2023 and 2024, for her role on Reservation Dogs, she was nominated for a Critics' Choice Television Award for Best Actress in a Comedy Series.

== Career ==
Jacobs began acting in the late 2000s with roles in the television series The Dead Zone (2007) and Assassin's Creed: Lineage (2009). In 2013, she played the lead character in Rhymes for Young Ghouls, which premiered at the 2013 Toronto International Film Festival. For her work in the film, Jacobs was nominated for a Canadian Screen Award for Best Actress in a leading role. The following year, she appeared in the music video for A Tribe Called Red's "Sisters".

In 2019, in the second season of American Gods, Jacobs played a young Cherokee college student, Sam Black Crow, who identifies as "two-spirited". In an interview, she said that Neil Gaiman (author of the novels on which the series is based) advocated strongly for her to be cast in the role, but noted, "I identify as queer, and not two-spirited, because I'm Mohawk and we don't have that."

Also in 2019, Jacobs played a recurring role as Lilith Bathory in the first and second season of the Netflix series The Order. From 2021 to 2023, she played a leading role on the acclaimed TV series Reservation Dogs about a group of Indigenous teenagers growing up on a reservation in rural Oklahoma. For the role, she was nominated for a Critics' Choice Television Award for Best Actress in a Comedy Series in 2023. In season 2, she also joined the writer's room of the show. In season 3, she directed episode 7, 'Wahoo!'.

In 2024 she was named as co-winner, alongside Lamar Johnson, of the Radius Award at the 12th Canadian Screen Awards. She also voiced Alasie in Ark: The Animated Series. In an interview by The Eastern Door, she noted she began recording for the role in summer 2020, with sound equipment shipped from Los Angeles to her apartment in Toronto, calling the process "at bit chaotic," but described the show's story as "really beautiful" and the Inuk character (Alasie) she voices, as comic relief, like a "little kid sister who can sometimes be annoying, but is really silly." She also revealed that she has recorded most of the lines for Alasie before she voiced Kahhori in What If...? season 2 and described the ability to "have fun with the role with letting myself be free" while voicing acting, and the witnessing the creative process on Ark: The Animated Series.

== Personal life ==
Jacobs is Kanienʼkehá:ka (Mohawk) and a member of the Bear Clan. At the time of her performance in Rhymes for Young Ghouls, Jacobs was a student at John Abbott College, studying correctional intervention. She identifies as queer. Jacobs collaborates with Canadian filmmaker D. W. Waterson, who is also her partner, through their production company called Night is Y.

== Filmography ==
Year	Title	Role	Note
2007	The Dead Zone	Monique	TV series
2008	South of the Moon	Alexa Dumont	Film
2009	Assassin's Creed: Lineage	Claudia Auditore	TV miniseries
2012	Exploding Sun	Nourhan	TV film
2013	The Blanketing	Seniya	Short film
2013	Rhymes for Young Ghouls	Aila	As Kawennáhere Devery Jacobs
2013–2015	Mohawk Girls	Lollipop	TV series
2015	A Big Black Short	Jess	Short film
2016	The Sun at Midnight	Lia	
2016	The Land of Rock and Gold	Andrea	
2016	Running Eagle	Judith	Short film
2016	Another WolfCop	Daisy	
2016	Level 16	Vivien	
2016	The Walking Dead: Michonne	Sam	Video game
2016	Stolen	Director	Short film
2018	The Lie	Britney Ismali	
2019	Blood Quantum	James	As Kawennáhere Devery Jacobs
2019	Cardinal	Sam Duchene	As Devery Jacobs
2019	Rustic Oracle	Older Ivy	As Kawennáhere Devery Jacobs
2019–2020	The Order	Lilith Bathory	TV series; recurring role
2019–2021	American Gods	Sam Blackcrow	TV series; recurring role
2021	Rutherford Falls	Jess Wells	TV series; recurring
2021	The 73rd Primetime Emmy Awards	Self (Presenter)	TV special
2021	Bootlegger	Mani	
2021	We Burn Like This	Chrissy B	
2021–2023	Reservation Dogs	Elora Danan	TV series; main role also writer and director
2022	Spirit Rangers	Wind Eagle	Voice role
2022	This Place	Kawenniióhstha	
2023	Backspot	Riley	Also producer
2023–2024	What If...?	Kahhori	Voice role; 4 episodes
2024	Echo	Bonnie	Miniseries
2024	Ark: The Animated Series	Alasie	Voice role
2025	Oh. What. Fun.	Donna	
2026	Forbidden Fruits	Bluebonnet	

== Awards ==
Year	Award	Category	Work	Result	Ref.
2014	Canadian Screen Awards	Best Actress in a Leading Role	Rhymes for Young Ghouls	Nominated	
2016	Whistler Film Festival	Best Performance in a Canadian Film	The Sun at Midnight	Won	
2017	American Indian Film Festival	Best Actress	The Sun at Midnight	Won	
2017	Yorkton Film Festival	Best Aboriginal Film	Stolen	Won	
2017	ImagineNATIVE Film and Media Arts Festival	Ellen Monague Award for Best Youth Work	Rae	Won	
2018	Palm Springs Shortfest	—N/a	Rae	Shortlisted	
2021	Gotham Awards	Outstanding Performance in New Series	Reservation Dogs	Nominated	
2023	Critics' Choice Television Awards	Best Actress in a Comedy Series	Reservation Dogs	Nominated	
2024	Critics' Choice Television Awards	Best Actress in a Comedy Series	Reservation Dogs	Nominated	
2024	Television Critics Association Awards	Individual Achievement in Comedy	Reservation Dogs	Nominated	
2024	Canadian Screen Awards	Radius Award		Won	
