= Matthew Breen (journalist) =

American journalist and editor

Matthew Breen is an American journalist, editor, producer, and consultant living in New York, NY, United States. He is the former editorial director at Logo. He was previously the editor-in-chief of The Advocate, a national LGBT news magazine, and deputy editor at Out. He was previously a freelance film critic, and the program director for the 2001 Austin Film Festival, and an associate film programmer for the 2002 IFP/West Los Angeles Film Festival, and media manager for the 1998 and 1999 Sundance Film Festivals.

Breen's petition demanding the pardon of the approximately 49,000 men convicted of "gross indecency" laws in the United Kingdom gathered nearly 500,000 signatures. U.K. campaigners and the relatives of Alan Turing delivered 10 Downing Street in 2015. The Alan Turing Law was enacted in 2017.
