= Gabriel Romero (actor) =

Mexican actor

- Born: Mexico City, Mexico
- Occupation: Actor
- Years active: 1998–present

Gabriel Romero (born in Mexico City) is a Mexican actor best known for his ground-breaking role as Fernandito, the first openly gay character on Spanish-language television, on the Telemundo sitcom Los Beltrán and for his role as Marco on the here! original series Dante's Cove.

== Career ==
Romero earned a Bachelor of Fine Arts degree in Theatre from the University of Southern California in 1993. He is a musician, having taken up piano at the age of six, and has trained as a painter, dancer and gymnast.

Romero starred in Los Beltrán as Dr. Fernando "Fernandito" Salazar, an openly gay surgeon involved in a long-term relationship with a man. The series was the first on Spanish-language television to feature an openly gay character and the first to feature a same-sex marriage when Fernandito and his partner Kevin wed. Los Beltrán was nominated for two GLAAD Media Awards, the first Spanish-language program to be so honored. The series also won the National Council of La Raza Alma Award and an Imagen Award for Best Comedy Series.

In 2006, Romero joined the cast for the second season of the gay horror series Dante's Cove, playing Marco, the owner of a trendy club on the island called H2Eau. As the season unfolded, Marco was drawn into conflict with Colin, owner of a local after-hours club, and Kai, the island's amoral "fixer."

He has an extensive background in live theatre and commercial voice-over work. Romero currently resides in Los Angeles.

== Personal life ==
Romero is bisexual.

== Filmography ==
Year	Film	Role	Other notes
2022	Call of Duty: Modern Warfare II	Additional Voice	(Video Game)
2018	Red Dead Redemption II	The Local Pedestrian Population (voice role)	(Video Game)
2017	Time's Up	The Target	(Short)
2015	If I Only Knew	Dr. Death	(Short)
2014	Revenge of the Bimbot Zombie Killers	Agent Miguel De La Cruz	
2012	Black Stockings	Domingo	(Short)
2011	The Man from Jalisco	Ramon Cortez	(Short)
2010	Divorced	(voice role)	(Short)
2010	The Dream Comes True	Man in Restaurant	(Short)
2009	Dish	Butcher	(Short)
2008	Low Country	Travis Gray	(Short)
2008	3 PM	Ruben	(Short)
2006	Saints Row	Stilwater's Resident (voice)	(Video Game)
2005	The Patron	Busboy #1	(Short)
2005	Taco Chick and Salsa Girl	Narrator	(Short)
2005	Myopia	Tony	(Short)
2004	Popcorn & Coke	Popcorn Guy	(Short)
2002	The Moment After	Gabe	(Short)
2002	My Straight Boyfriend	Boyfriend	(Short)
2000	Home the Horror Story	Jesus	
1992	El alienado		(Short)
1990	Algo se ha roto		(Short)
Year	Television series	Role	Other notes
2023	What If...?	Conquistador Rodrigo Alphonso Gonzolo (voice role)	Episode: "What If... Kahhori Reshaped the World?"
2017	Ingobernable	Sicario	TV series, 1 episode
2014, 2016	Archer	Soldier Ocho (voice role)	TV series, 7 episodes
2010	Chico's Angels	Chico	web-series, 1 episode
2008	Ylse	Sergio	TV series, 1 episode
2007	Lonelygirl15	Professor Del Mundo	Web series, 3 episodes
2006-2007	Dante's Cove	Marco Laveau	TV series, 7 episodes
2006	Handy Manny	Ben (voice role)	TV series, 1 episode
2006	Fashion House	Reporter #1	TV series, 1 episode
2005	Maya & Miguel	Quetzpallin; Sr. Concepcion (voice role)	TV series, 1 episode
1999-2001	Los Beltrán	Dr. Fernando Salazar	TV series, 44 episodes
2000	Blood Money	Bautista Aragon	(TV movie)
1999	Michael Landon, the Father I Knew	Armando	(TV movie)
1998	Silk Stalkings	Arturo Fuentes	TV series, 1 episode
