= Gabriel Romero (footballer) =

Argentine professional footballer

Personal information
- Full name: Héctor Gabriel Romero
- Date of birth: 5 January 1994 (age 32)
- Place of birth: Orán, Argentina
- Height: 1.75 m (5 ft 9 in)
- Position: Midfielder

Team information
- Current team: Atlético Macachín

Youth career
- River Plate
- All Boys

Senior career*
Years	Team	Apps	(Gls)
2014–2019	All Boys	15	(0)
2016–2017	→ Juventud Antoniana (loan)	13	(0)
2019	Villa Mengelle		
2020–	Atlético Macachín	3	(0)
- * Club domestic league appearances and goals as of 10:41, 30 August 2020 (UTC)

Héctor Gabriel Romero (born 5 January 1994) is an Argentine professional footballer who plays as a midfielder for Atlético Macachín.

== Career ==
Romero, who had a spell in River Plate's academy, started off with All Boys. His debut appearance arrived on 6 December 2014 as the club won away to Sarmiento, with the midfielder appearing for seventy minutes at the Estadio Eva Perón; he had previously been an unused substitute twice in the preceding October, including for the home fixture with Sarmiento. Having not featured in the subsequent 2015 Primera B Nacional season, Romero departed on loan in January 2016 to Juventud Antoniana of Torneo Federal A. He scored his first senior goal in May during a victory over Defensores de Belgrano.

Juventud Antoniana extended his loan in June 2016 to keep him with the Salta outfit until mid-2017, prior to playing in seven fixtures in 2017–18 back with All Boys in Primera B Nacional. After spending one more campaign with All Boys, in Primera B Metropolitana due to relegation in 2017–18, Romero departed in mid-2019 and subsequently joined Villa Mengelle of Liga Cultural. In early 2020, Romero moved to Torneo Regional Federal Amateur side Atlético Macachín.

== Career statistics ==
As of 30 August 2020.

Appearances and goals by club, season and competition
Club	Season	League			Cup		League Cup		Continental		Other		Total	
Club	Season	Division	Apps	Goals	Apps	Goals	Apps	Goals	Apps	Goals	Apps	Goals	Apps	Goals
All Boys	2014	Primera B Nacional	1	0	0	0	—		—		0	0	1	0
All Boys	2015	Primera B Nacional	0	0	0	0	—		—		0	0	0	0
All Boys	2016	Primera B Nacional	0	0	0	0	—		—		0	0	0	0
All Boys	2016–17	Primera B Nacional	0	0	0	0	—		—		0	0	0	0
All Boys	2017–18	Primera B Nacional	7	0	0	0	—		—		0	0	7	0
All Boys	2018–19	Primera B Metropolitana	7	0	1	0	—		—		0	0	8	0
All Boys	Total		15	0	1	0	—		—		0	0	16	0
Juventud Antoniana (loan)	2016	Torneo Federal A	5	0	1	0	—		—		6 (Note: Appearance(s) in the Torneo Federal A play-offs)	1	12	1
Juventud Antoniana (loan)	2016–17	Torneo Federal A	8	0	0	0	—		—		2	0	10	0
Juventud Antoniana (loan)	Total		13	0	1	0	—		—		8	1	22	1
Atlético Macachín	2020	Torneo Amateur	3	0	0	0	—		—		0	0	3	0
Career total			31	0	2	0	—		—		8	1	41	1
