= Sheena Metal =

American talk-show host

- Born: Jennifer Jean Sherwin; 1967 (age 57–58); United States
- Occupation: Talk show host

Jennifer Jean Sherwin (born 1967), known professionally as Sheena Metal, is an American talk-show host, actress, and internet personality. She is the host of "The Sheena Metal Experience" on LATalkRadio.com, "aMusic Highway", "Music Highway", and "Haunted Playground". She was the host of "Two Chicks Talkin' Politics" (with Susan Olsen).

Sheena Metal was named on Talkers Magazine's 2013 "Frontier Fifty" list of "Outstanding Talk Media Webcasters".

She hosts regularly at the Hollywood Improv, where, in 2014, she celebrated 20 years as a radio talk show host.

In 2013, Metal disclosed how she found out she has an intersex trait.
