= Ian Pollack =

Ian Pollack may refer to:

- Ian F. Pollack, American physician
- Ian Pollack, from The Amazing Race 3
