= Hungerburgbahn =

Funicular in Innsbruck, Austria

Coordinates: 47°16′59″N 11°24′03″E

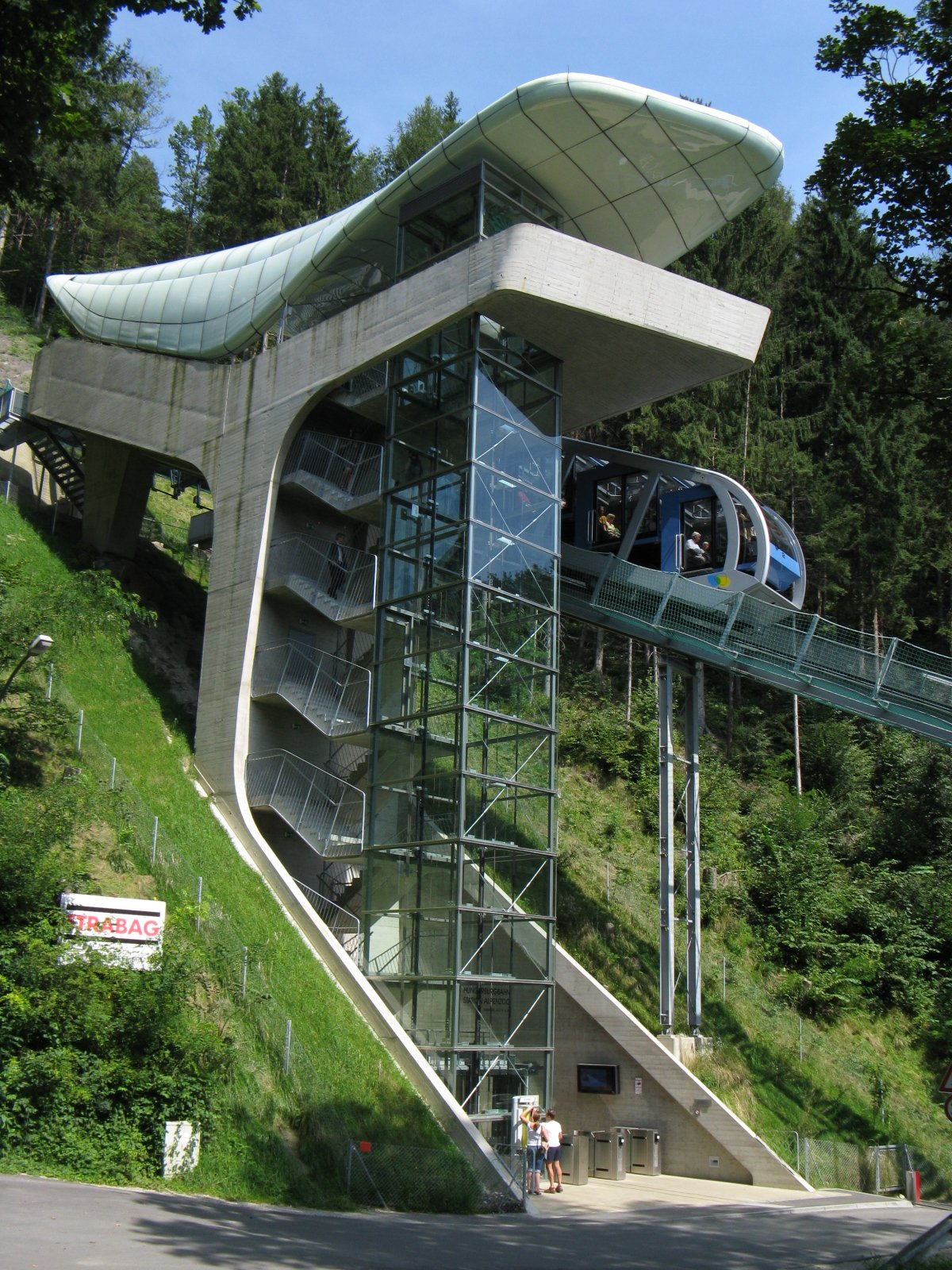
- Car #2 at Alpenzoo Station.

Overview
- Native name: Hungerburgbahn
- Status: Operational
- Locale: Innsbruck, Tyrol, Austria
- Termini: Congress Innsbruck; Hungerburg
- Stations: 4

Service
- Type: Funicular
- Services: 1

History
- Opened: 12 September 1906 (First alignment)
- Closed: 8 December 2005
- Reopened: 1 December 2007 (Current alignment)

Technical
- Line length: 1.838 km (1.14 mi)
- Num of tracks: 1 (with central passing loop)
- Track gauge: 1,440 mm (4 ft 8 11/16 in) (2007-)
- Old gauge: 1,000 mm (3 ft 3 3/8 in) (1906-2005)
- Operating speed: 10 m/s (22 mph)
- Highest elevation: 857 m (2,812 ft)

The Hungerburgbahn is a hybrid funicular railway in Innsbruck, Austria, connecting the city district of Hungerburg with the city centre. The current line opened on 1 December 2007, replacing a previous alignment that operated from 1906 to 2005. The new Hungerburgbahn is one of the landmarks of the city, with stations designed by Zaha Hadid, and built by Leitner AG.

== Current Line ==
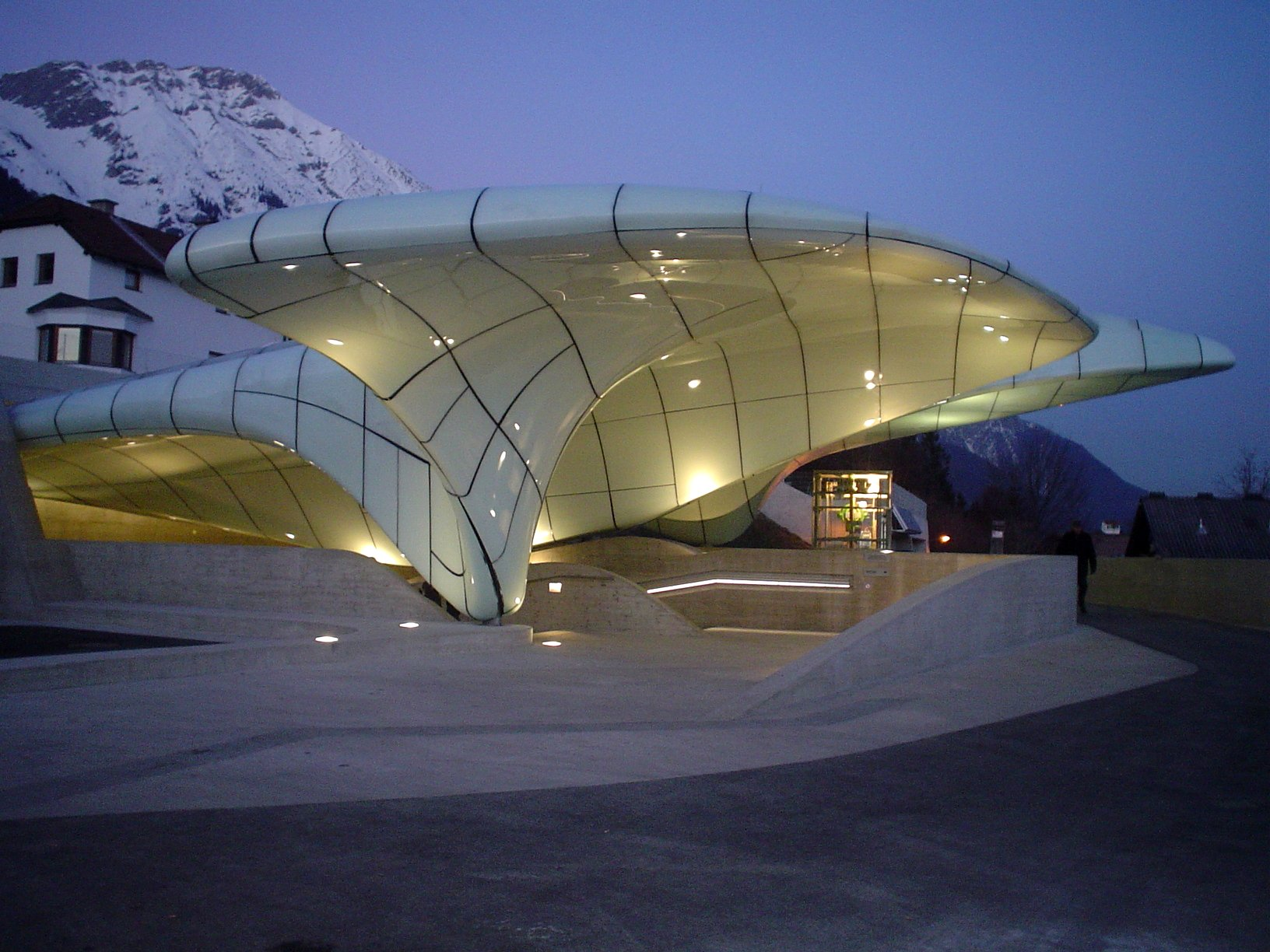
Top station: Hungerburg

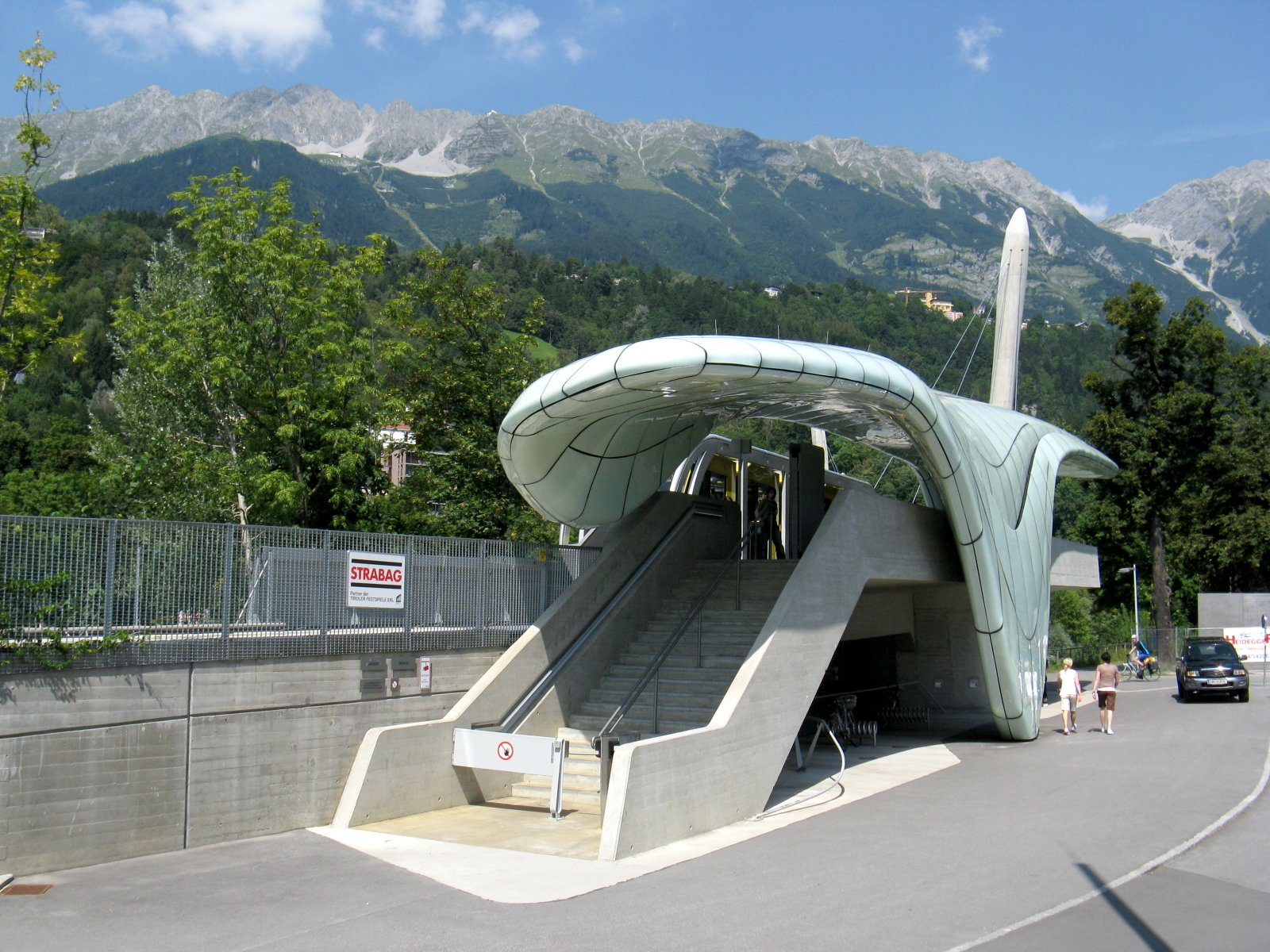
Löwenhaus intermediate station

The new Hungerburgbahn was put into operation in December 2007, after two years of construction. The renowned architect Zaha Hadid, who had already planned the Bergisel ski jump in Innsbruck, won an open competition to design the stations for the line. The project was financed and implemented as a public private partnership between the city of Innsbruck, STRABAG and Leitner AG. The company will operate the train for a limited time, after which the infrastructure and operations return to the municipality.

The new Hungerburgbahn is unusual for a funicular in that, although it does not reach the maximum gradient of its former incarnation, it experiences rapidly changing inclination both during the course of the route and at the various stops, transitioning between a relatively flat southern section (with ramps leading in and out of the two tunnels on either side of the river crossing), and a steeply inclined northern section more typical of a funicular. The line has an overall rise of 288 m (944.9 ft).

The line is single-tracked except for a passing loop at the midpoint. At the lower end, the route begins underground at Kongresshaus station at the eastern end of the Kongresshaus (a conference and concert venue) in the city centre, then runs beneath local streets in a 371.5 m (1,219 ft) long single-track tunnel before surfacing immediately south of Löwenhaus intermediate station. The line crosses the Inn on a 242 m-long (794 ft) S-shaped cable-stayed steel bridge with two pylons, follows the north bank of the river in the St. Nikolaus neighbourhood, then descends into the 445 m-long (1,460 ft) Weiherburg tunnel. The tunnel includes the midpoint of the route, and thus the passing loop. North of the passing loop, and while still in the tunnel, the line changes character from the relatively level southern portion, to the steeply inclined northern portion. The line rises sharply from the tunnel and follows a curved alignment, stopping at the Alpenzoo intermediate station, and crossing a 462 m-long (1,516 ft) reinforced concrete bridge. The new route joins the old route for the final 100 m (330 ft) of the ascent to the upper terminus at Hungerburg station.

The line is mainly used for tourism, including from the Kongresshaus adjacent to the eponymous Kongresshaus station, and from the Nordkette ski area, which is accessible via the Nordkette Cable Car from the square opposite Hungerburg station. The line has relatively lower utility as a commuting route, as its upper station is located at the far eastern end of the Hungerburg district, away from most housing estates. At the lower end, the line terminates in an area containing the Kongresshaus convention centre, parking garages, bus parking, and part of the University of Innsbruck grounds. However, it is isolated by over 800 m from Innsbruck Hauptbahnhof, the city's main railway station, with the gap bridged by city bus lines.

The city of Innsbruck finances additional off-peak hours, and normal transport network core zone tickets (monthly, half-yearly and annual) are accepted as valid payment.

=== Vehicles ===
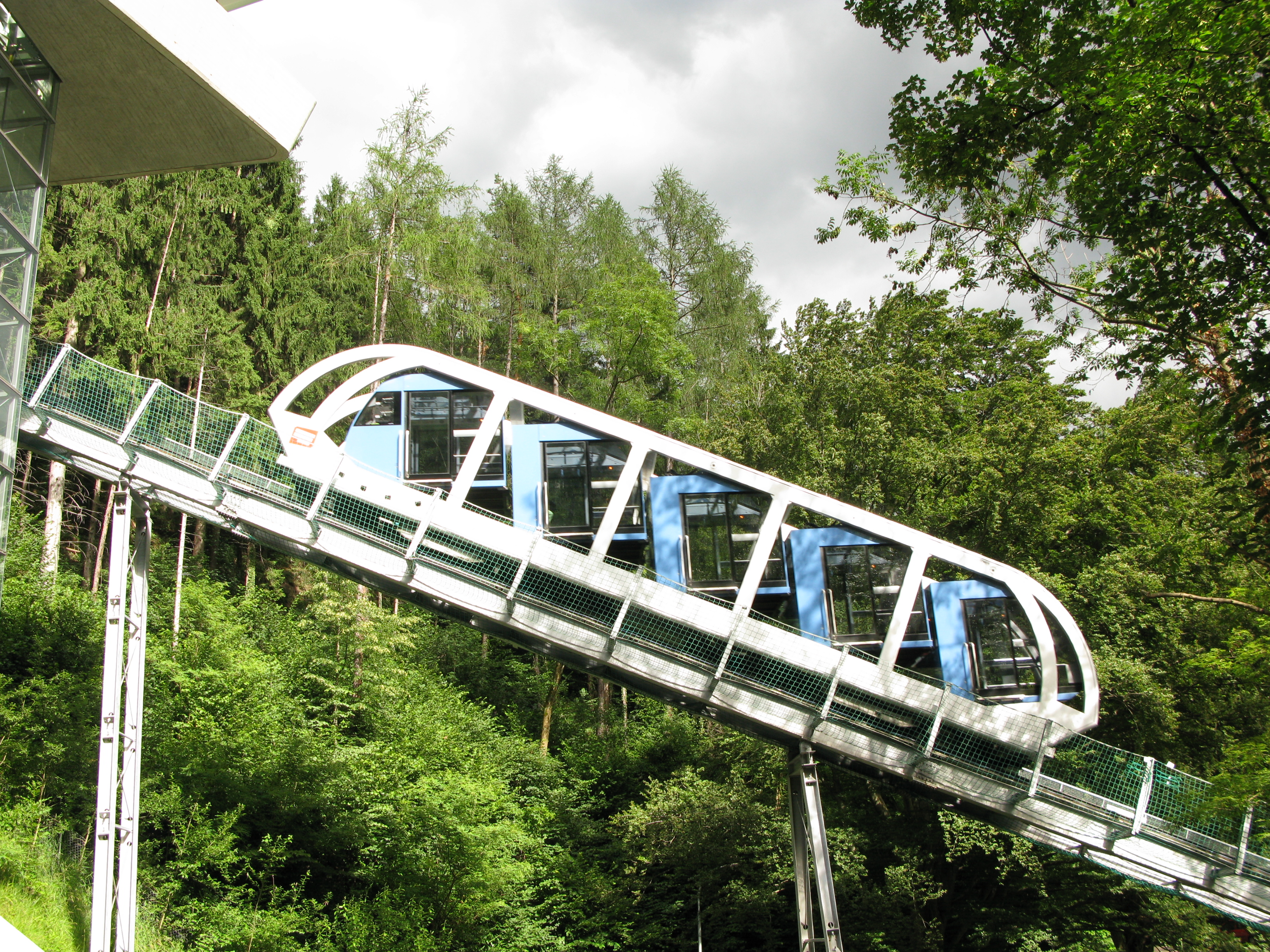
Side view of Car No. 2 showing the five separate passenger compartments inclined to remain level on sloped track

Given the extreme change in gradient between the southern and northern sections of the line, Leitner AG designed the line's two funicular cars to each hold five smaller passenger compartments, suspended in a common frame. The inclination of these compartments is actively adjusted by a motor along the course of the route such that the floors remain horizontal throughout the trip. The two 130-person vehicles each have a transport capacity of 1,200 people per hour and direction.

The outer frames of both cars are painted silver. The five individual compartments of Car No. 1 are painted yellow, while those of Car No. 2 are painted blue.

=== Controversy ===
The decision by city leadership to implement the new project was the object of heavy criticism by citizens' initiatives and the city's political opposition. A referendum on the future of the Hungerburgbahn had been demanded by a variety of groups opposed to the project, but the demand was not met. The formerly historically listed railway was to be preserved as a symbol of the city of Innsbruck just a few weeks before its 100th anniversary of service, and last-minute demolition was to be prevented. There was also criticism of the planned de facto privatization of the railway as part of the new construction project and associated fears that fares could rise significantly.

As a result of the controversy, the groundbreaking for the new rail project had to be carried out under police protection. December 8, 2005 was abruptly set as the last day of operation of the old Hungerburgbahn, with staff forbidden from holding farewell celebrations or from informing the public about the end of operations.

=== Snow issues ===
The design of the roof of the station at Hungerburg is such that snow can enter the station, resulting in its partial closure after snow falls.

== Former Line ==
The Hungerburg district was founded by Sebastian Kandler at the turn of the 20th century as a tourist centre. The first Hungerburgbahn was developed by engineer Joseph Riehl to serve the new district, and entered service on September 12, 1906. Together with the Nordkette Cable Car, the Hungerburgbahn opened up the Nordkette (including Seegrube and the Hafelekar) to skiing and other recreational use, and additionally provided public transport from the higher residential areas of the Hungerburg to the city centre.

The lower station was situated in the city district of Saggen, near the southern bank of the Inn river. From there the line ascended steeply, crossing the river on a sloped steel truss bridge, and proceeding on a straight alignment up to the Hungerburg district. The length of the track was 839 m (918 yd) and the rise was 287 m (942 ft), with the steepest section of the line inclined at a 48.7% gradient.

The line was built to 1,000 mm (3 ft 3 3/8 in) metre gauge, and used rails of the Stanserhorn wedge-head format. Up to 92 people could be transported per cabin, at driving speeds of 2.5 m/s (8.2 ft/s) or 4 m/s (13 ft/s). With the original AC motor from 1906, the journey took 11 minutes, and 300 people could be transported per hour. In 1957–58 the railway was completely overhauled; the longitudinal profile in the upper part of the route was corrected and the old drive was replaced by a new drive of 190 kW (250 hp).

On July 31, 1987, Alpenzoo Station was opened to serve the nearby Alpine zoo. This stop was slightly below the midpoint of the route, meaning that while the lower car served the station, the higher car (being attached to the same cable) was forced to wait above the passing loop.

Since the original Hungerburgbahn's closure, the base station of the old line has been preserved, including a rotunda that housed the Innsbruck Giant Circular Painting from the line's opening until the artwork was relocated in 2010. The "Talstation" cultural centre and event space (literally translated, "Valley Station") occupy the building. In addition to office and seminar rooms for young Innsbruck clubs and initiatives, it also offers a bar, a band room and a photo laboratory. The former departure hall has been converted into an event hall that can hold 250 people, and is used for theatre, concerts, discussions and film lectures.

Of the former alignment, only about 100 m (110 yd) at the upper end of the line including Hungerburg Station remains in use as part of the current line. Other remnants of the old line still exist, including the iconic steel truss bridge over the Inn river (see photos of the line while in operation), and a 160 m (170 yd) long stamped concrete viaduct between the former Alpenzoo station (now relocated on the new line) and Hungerburg station. Both bridges are heritage listed. Most of the track systems have now been dismantled and the rest of the former route has largely grown over, but is still clearly visible.

=== Images ===
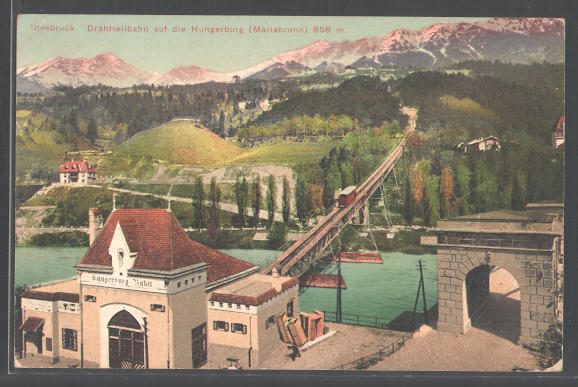
Postcard celebrating the Hungerburgbahn, about 1906

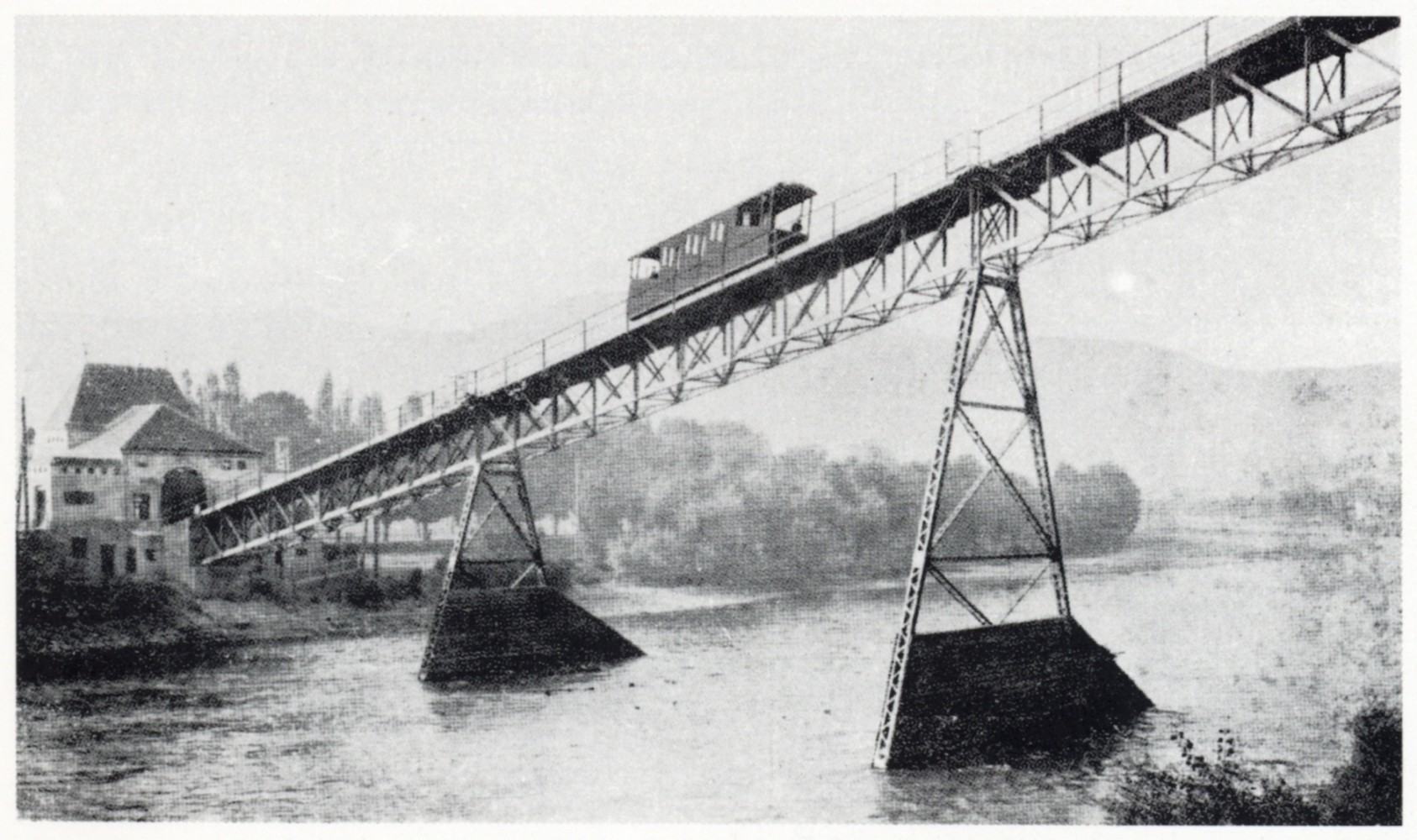
Original Hungerburgbahn crossing the Inn river, about 1907

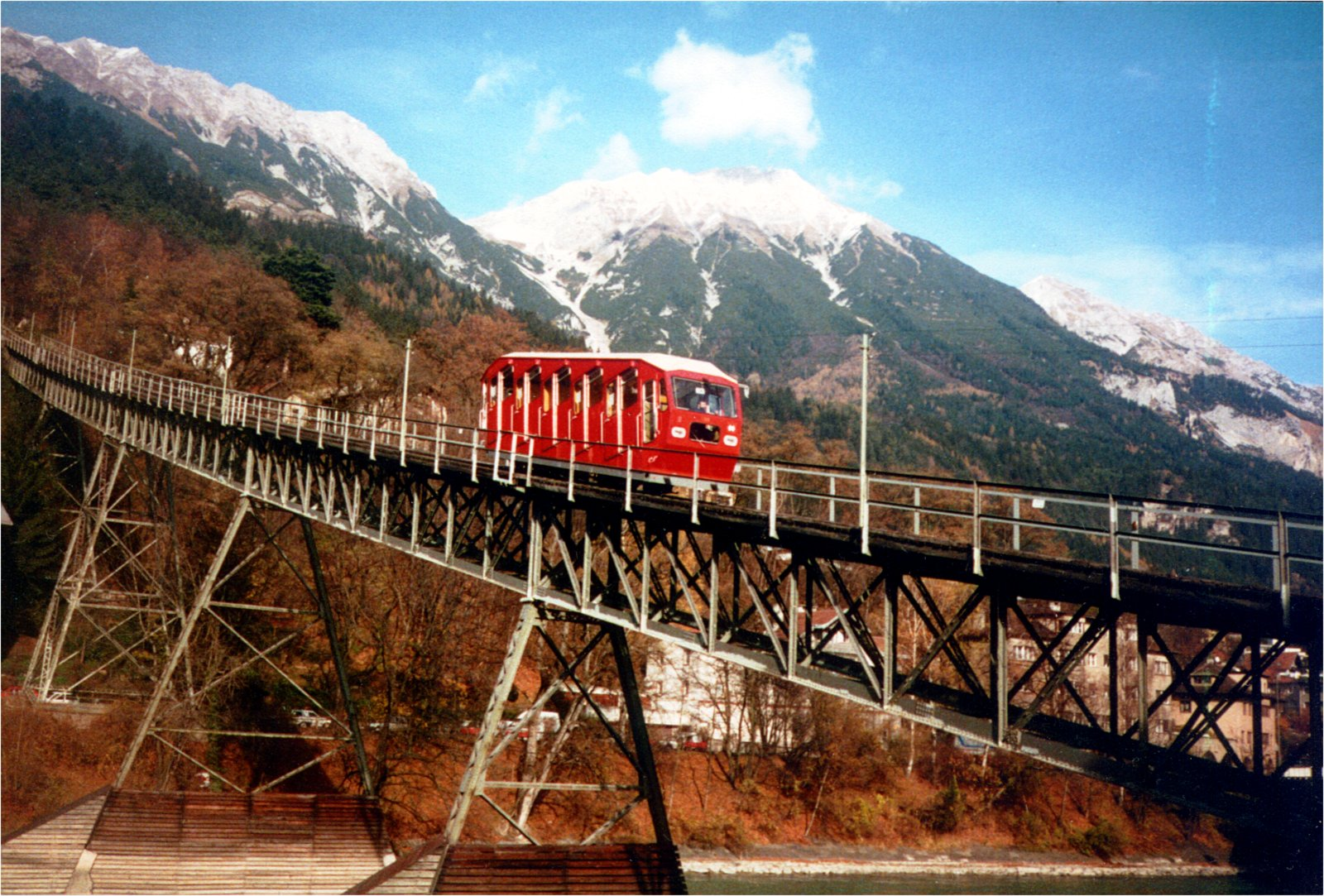
The Innbrücke ("Inn Bridge") of the old line, ascending from the lower station

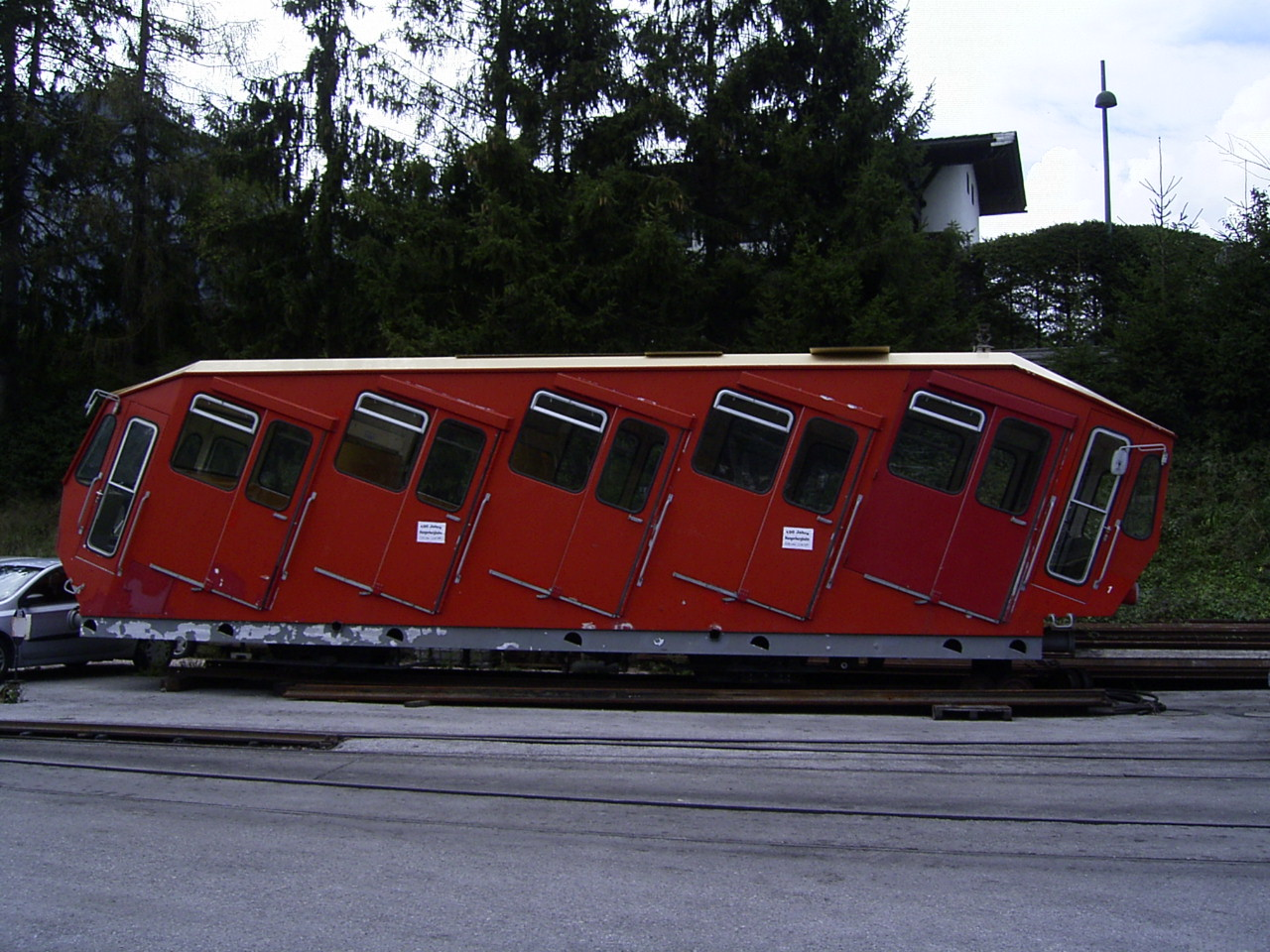
Old Hungerburgbahn car following decommissioning

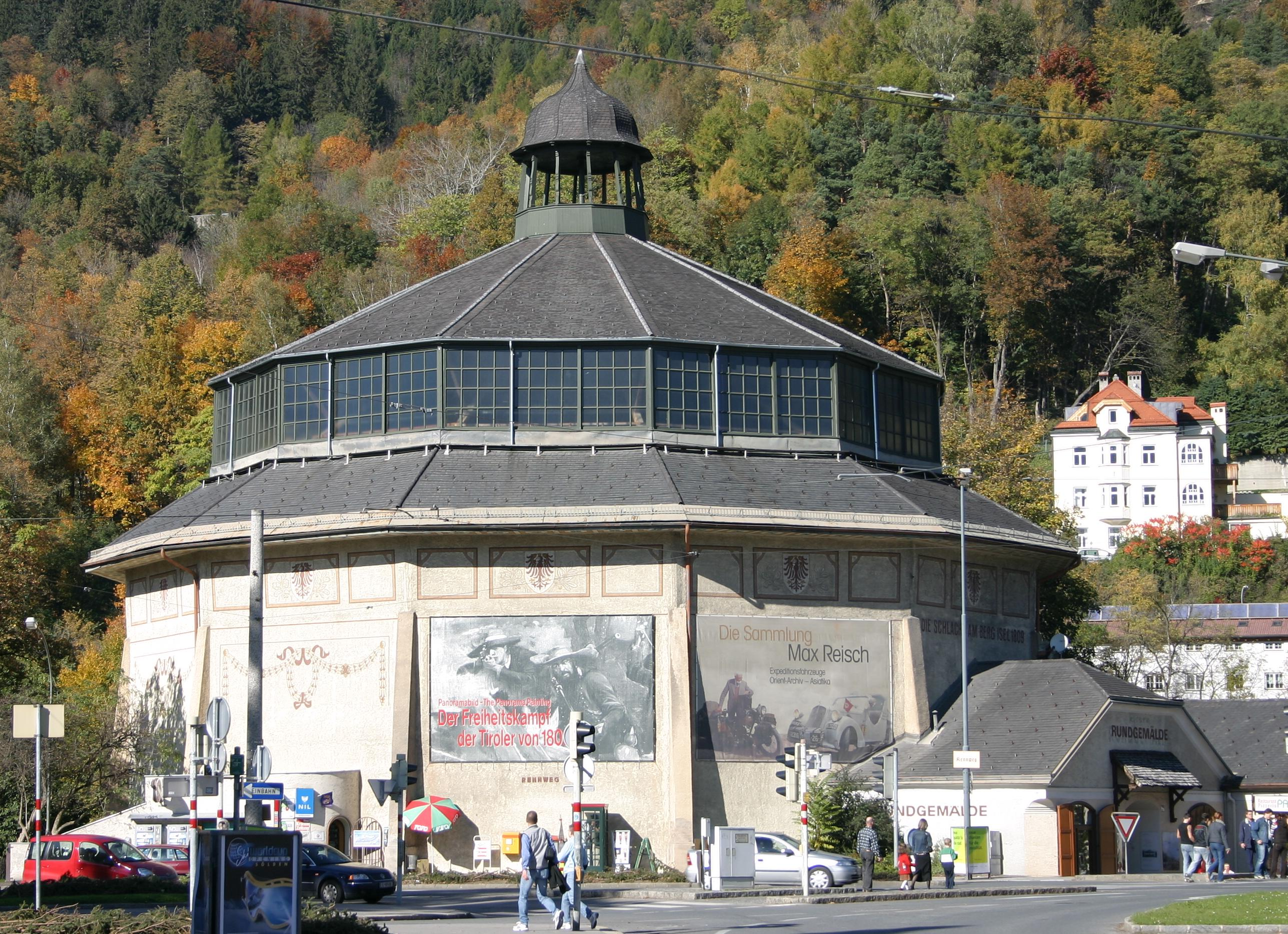
Rotunda at the former Hungerburg base station in the Saggen district, Innsbruck
