= The Amazing Race 3 =

Season of television series

- Season 3
- Region 1 DVD cover
- Presented by: Phil Keoghan
- No. of teams: 12
- Winners: Flo Pesenti and Zach Behr
- No. of legs: 13
- Distance traveled: 41,000 mi (66,000 km)
- No. of episodes: 11

Release
- Original network: CBS
- Original release: October 2 – December 18, 2002

Additional information
- Filming dates: August 9 – September 8, 2002

Series chronology
- ← Previous; Season 2 Next → Season 4

The Amazing Race 3 is the third season of the American reality competition show The Amazing Race. Hosted by Phil Keoghan, it featured twelve teams of two, each with a pre-existing relationship, competing in a race around the world. This season visited four continents and thirteen countries, traveling approximately 41,000 miles (66,000 km) over thirteen legs. Filming took place from August 9 to September 8, 2002. Starting in the Everglades, racers traveled through Mexico, England, Scotland, Portugal, Spain, Morocco, Germany, Austria, Switzerland, Malaysia, Singapore, and Vietnam, before returning to the United States, traveling through Hawaii, and finishing in Seattle. The season premiered on CBS on October 2, 2002, and concluded on December 18, 2002.

Friends Flo Pesenti and Zach Behr were the winners of this season, while married parents Teri and Ian Pollack finished in second place, and brothers Ken and Gerard Duphiney finished in third place.

== Format ==
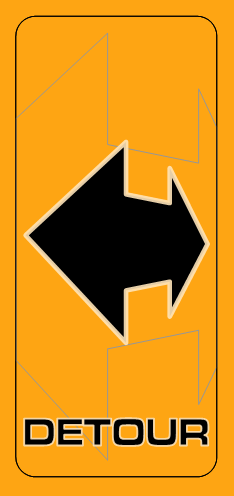
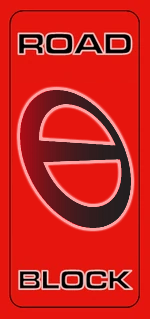
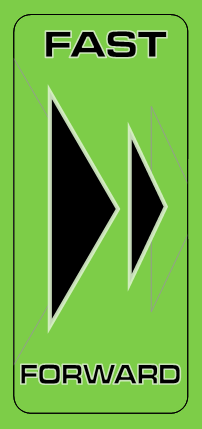
The clues which contestants receive during the course of the race generally fall into four categories: Route Info, Detour, Roadblock, and Fast Forward.

The Amazing Race is a reality television show created by Bertram van Munster and Elise Doganieri, and hosted by Phil Keoghan. The series follows teams of two competing in a race around the world. Each leg of the race requires teams to deduce clues, navigate foreign environments, interact with locals, perform physical and mental challenges, and travel on a limited budget provided by the show. At each stop during the leg, teams receive clues inside sealed envelopes, which fall into one of these categories:

- Route Info: These are simple instructions that teams must follow before they can receive their next clue.
- Detour: A Detour is a choice between two tasks. Teams may choose either task and switch tasks if they find one option too difficult. There is usually one Detour present on each leg.
- Roadblock: A Roadblock is a task that only one team member can complete. Teams must choose which member will complete the task based on a brief clue they receive before fully learning the details of the task. There is usually one Roadblock present on each leg.
- Fast Forward: A Fast Forward is a task that only one team may complete, which allows that team to skip all remaining tasks on the leg and go directly to the next Pit Stop. Teams may only claim one Fast Forward during the entire race.

Most teams who arrive last at the Pit Stop of each leg are progressively eliminated, while the first team to arrive at the finish line in the final episode wins the grand prize of US$1,000,000.

== Production ==
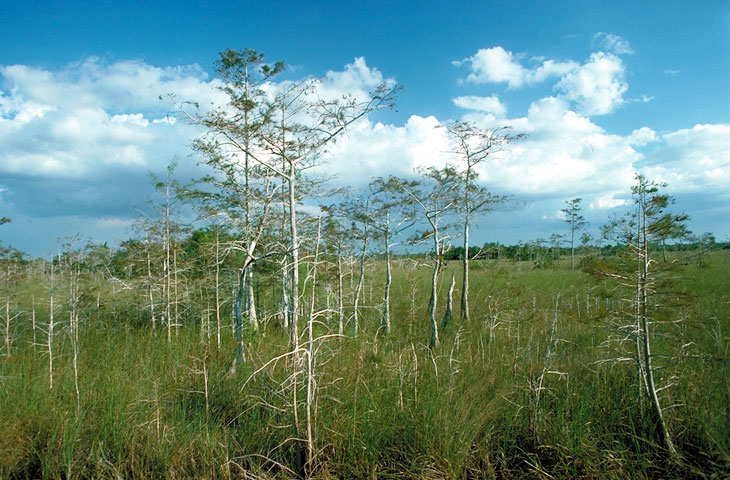
The Starting Line of The Amazing Race 3 was set in Everglades National Park in Florida.

The third season of The Amazing Race spanned a total of 41,000 miles (66,000 km) and visited four continents and 13 countries, 12 of which were new to the series: Mexico, England, Scotland, Portugal, Spain, Morocco, Germany, Austria, Switzerland, Malaysia, Singapore, and Vietnam. Casting for this season began in April 2002. Filming began on August 9, 2002, and finished on September 8, 2002.

== Contestants ==
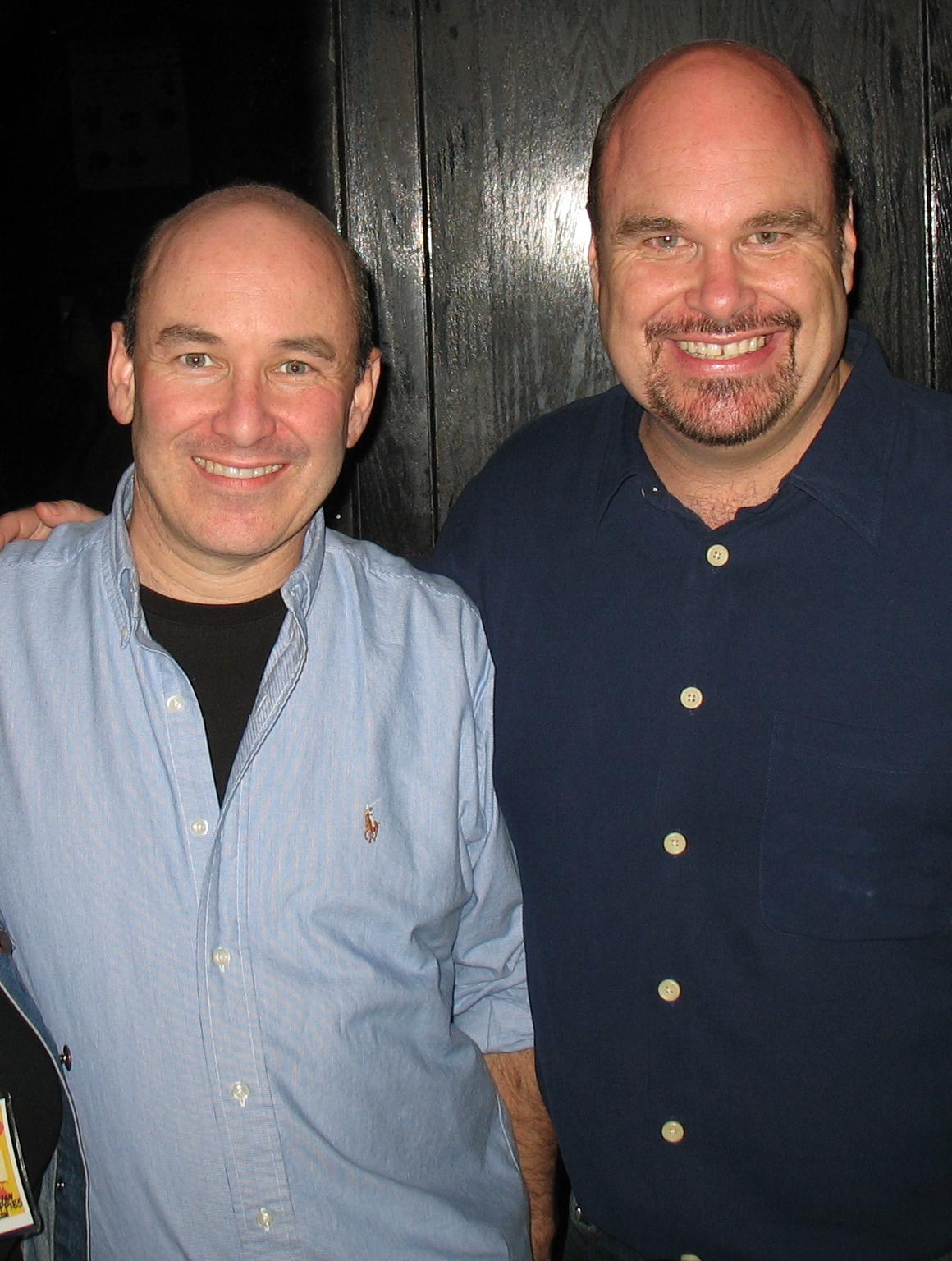
Gerard and Ken Duphiney

The cast of The Amazing Race 3 included twelve teams. Jill and her brother F.T. had originally applied for season 1, but after F.T. was killed on September 11, John Vito and Jill applied in his memory.

Contestants	Age	Relationship	Hometown	Status
Gina Diggins	35	Soccer Moms	Hilton Head Island, South Carolina	Eliminated 1st (in Puente de Ixtla, Mexico)
Sylvia Pitts	34	Soccer Moms	Hilton Head Island, South Carolina	Eliminated 1st (in Puente de Ixtla, Mexico)
Tramel Raggs	22	Brother & Sister	Gary, Indiana	Eliminated 2nd (in Tulum, Mexico)
Talicia Raggs	29	Brother & Sister	Los Angeles, California	Eliminated 2nd (in Tulum, Mexico)
Dennis Hyde	48	Father & Son	Lexington, Kentucky	Eliminated 3rd (in Stonehaven, Scotland)
Andrew Hyde	21	Father & Son	Lexington, Kentucky	Eliminated 3rd (in Stonehaven, Scotland)
Heather Mahar	25	Law School Roommates	Boston, Massachusetts	Eliminated 4th (in Lisbon, Portugal)
Eve Madison	25	Law School Roommates	New York City, New York	Eliminated 4th (in Lisbon, Portugal)
Michael Ilacqua	28	Long-Distance Dating	San Diego, California	Eliminated 5th (in Fez, Morocco)
Kathy Perez	31	Long-Distance Dating	Birmingham, Michigan	Eliminated 5th (in Fez, Morocco)
Aaron Goldschmidt	27	Lifelong Friends	New York City, New York	Eliminated 6th (in Marrakesh, Morocco)
Arianne Udell	27	Lifelong Friends	New York City, New York	Eliminated 6th (in Marrakesh, Morocco)
Andre Plummer	32	Cop & Fireman	Los Angeles, California	Eliminated 7th (in Schwangau, Germany)
Damon Wafer	33	Cop & Fireman	Long Beach, California	Eliminated 7th (in Schwangau, Germany)
John Vito Pietanza	28	Dating	Staten Island, New York	Eliminated 8th (in Singapore)
Jill Aquilino	24	Dating	Manhattan, New York	Eliminated 8th (in Singapore)
Derek Riker	32	Twins & Models	Los Angeles, California	Eliminated 9th (in Ho Chi Minh City, Vietnam)
Drew Riker	32	Twins & Models	Los Angeles, California	Eliminated 9th (in Ho Chi Minh City, Vietnam)
Ken Duphiney	40	Brothers	New York City, New York	Third place
Gerard Duphiney	35	Brothers	Denville, New Jersey	Third place
Teri Pollack	49	Married Parents	Palm City, Florida	Runners-up
Ian Pollack	50	Married Parents	Palm City, Florida	Runners-up
Flo Pesenti	23	Friends	New York City, New York	Winners
Zach Behr	23	Friends	New York City, New York	Winners

Future appearances

Teri & Ian and John Vito & Jill were selected to compete in The Amazing Race: All-Stars.

In 2021, Andrew Shayde (né Hyde) appeared on Naked and Afraid and lasted 13 days in South Africa before being removed for a possible MRSA infection. In 2023, Shayde returned for Naked and Afraid's fifteenth season once again in South Africa. Shayde later appeared on the spin-off Naked and Afraid: Castaways. Shayde also competed on the CBS reality competition show Buddy Games. In 2024, Shayde appeared on Naked and Afraid XL.

== Results ==
The following teams are listed with their placements in each leg. Placements are listed in finishing order.

- A red placement with a dagger (†) indicates that the team was eliminated.
- An underlined blue placement with a double-dagger (‡) indicates that the team was the last to arrive at a Pit Stop in a non-elimination leg.
- A green ƒ indicates that the team won the Fast Forward.

Team placement (by leg)
Team	1	2	3	4	5	6	7	8	9	10	11	12	13
Flo & Zach	2nd	5th	3rd	2nd	4th (Note: Flo and Zach, and John Vito and Jill, tied for 4th place after both teams stepped on the Pit Stop mat at the same time.)	2nd	1stƒ	2nd	5th‡	3rd	2nd	3rd‡	1st
Teri & Ian	8th	10th	9th	5th	6th	1stƒ	4th	3rd	4th	4th	1st	1st	2nd
Ken & Gerard	1stƒ	6th	2nd	1st	1st	3rd	5th	4th	2nd	2nd	3rd	2nd	3rd
Derek & Drew	11th	1stƒ	1st	3rd	3rd	4th	2nd	1st	3rd	1st	4th† (Note: Derek and Drew initially arrived 3rd, but had inadvertently skipped the Roadblock and had to backtrack to complete it. Ken and Gerard checked in during this time, dropping Derek and Drew to last.)		
John Vito & Jill	5th	7th	7th	6th	4th	5th	3rd	5th‡	1stƒ	5th†			
Andre & Damon	9th (Note: Andre and Damon initially arrived 7th, but were issued a 78-minute penalty for not following the donkey route correctly, and started the next leg 9th.)	8th	8th	4th	2nd	6th	6th†						
Aaron & Arianne	3rd	2nd	4th	8th	7th	7th†							
Michael & Kathy	4th	4th	6th	7th	8th†								
Heather & Eve	6th	3rd	5th	9th† (Note: Heather and Eve initially arrived 1st, but were issued a 37-minute penalty because they had taken a taxi to the Pit Stop instead of traveling on foot as the clue had specified. All of the other teams checked in during this penalty time, dropping Heather and Eve to last.)									
Dennis & Andrew	7th	9th	10th†ƒ										
Tramel & Talicia	10th	11th†											
Gina & Sylvia	12th†												

== Race summary ==
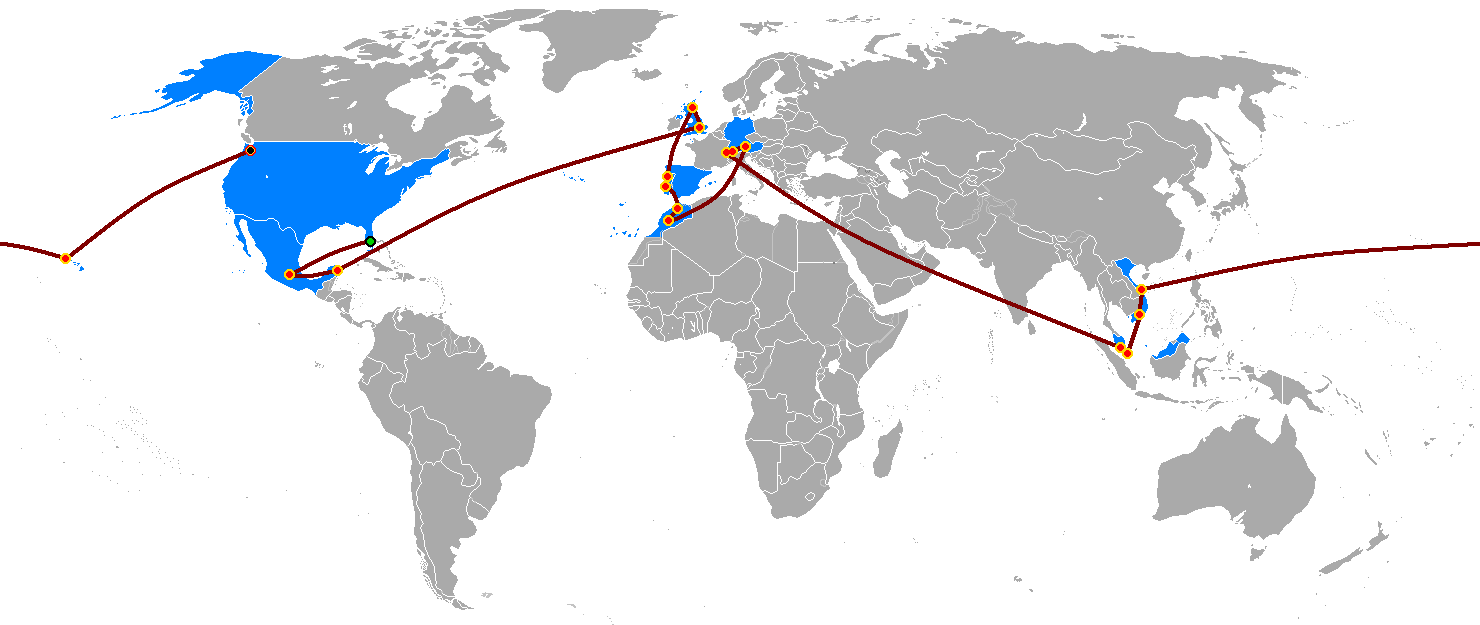
The route of The Amazing Race 3.

Destinations	Air travel Rail travel Water travel Bus travel Helicopter travel Bicycle travel Gondola travel
Route Markers	Detour Roadblock Fast Forward Pit Stop

=== Leg 1 (United States → Mexico) ===
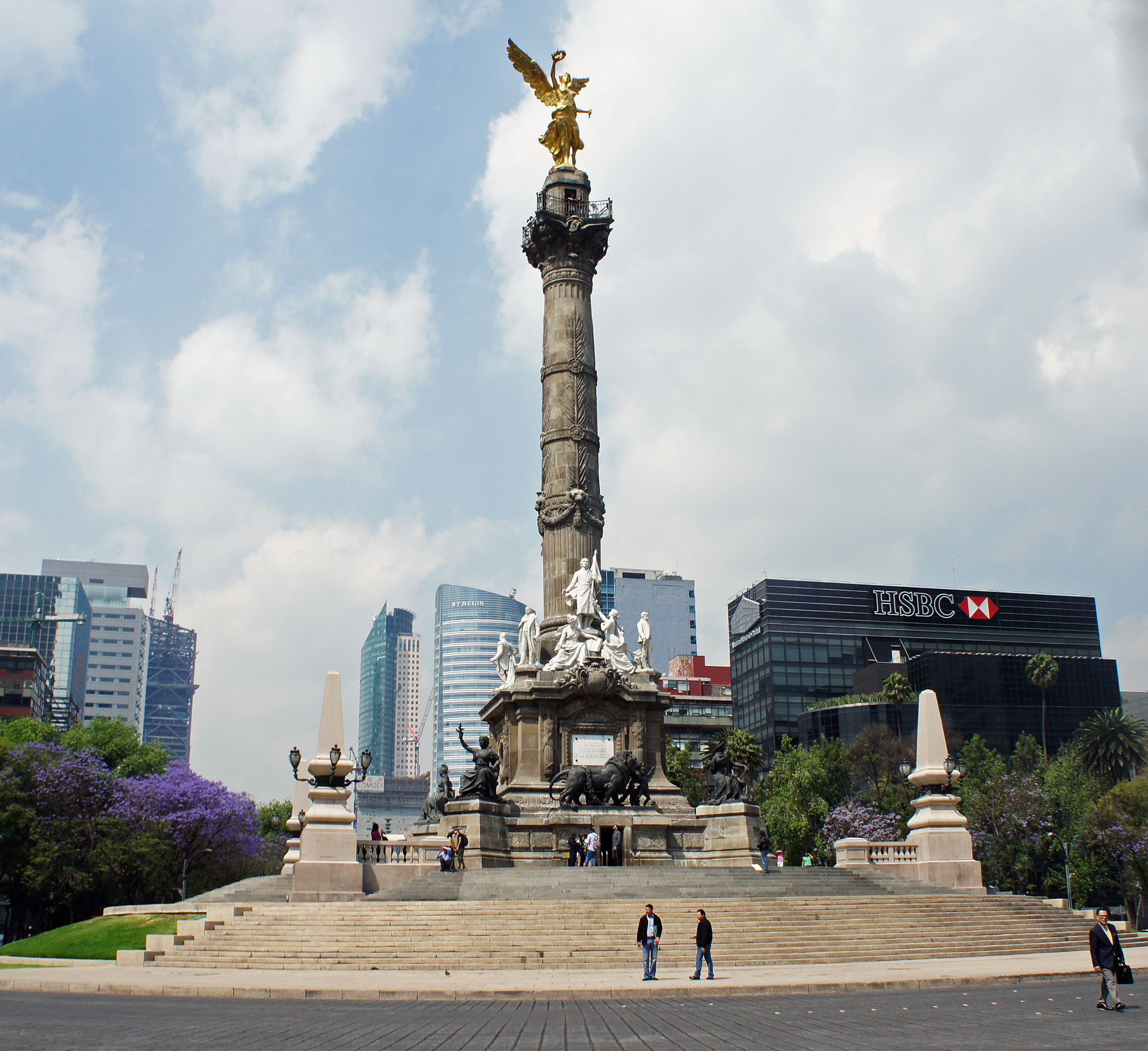
The Angel of Independence in Mexico City was the first destination on The Amazing Race 3.

- Episode 1: "What If Our Parachute Doesn't Open?" (October 2, 2002)
- Prize: A seven-night Caribbean cruise (awarded to Ken and Gerard)
- Eliminated: Gina and Sylvia

Locations

- Miami-Dade, Florida (Everglades National Park) (Starting Line)
- Miami → Mexico City, Mexico
- Mexico City (Angel of Independence)
- Mexico City (Zócalo)
- Mexico City (Hotel de Cortes)
- Mexico City (Plaza Santo Domingo)
- Mexico City (Hotel de Cortes) → San José Vista Hermosa (Tequesquitengo Airfield)
- Puente de Ixtla (Hacienda San Gabriel de las Palmas)

Episode summary

- From the Everglades, teams drove themselves to Miami International Airport, where they had to book one of two flights to Mexico City, Mexico. Once there, teams had to travel to the Angel of Independence, where they received a picture of a man named Pablo. They had to use the picture as a reference to find him at the Zócalo, where he gave them their next clue directing them to the Hotel de Cortés. There, teams had to sign up for one of three charter buses leaving the next morning to an unknown destination (San José Vista Hermosa).
- This season's first Fast Forward required one team to travel to Plaza Santo Domingo and search for the one street typist out of dozens who had a "special message": the Fast Forward award. Ken and Gerard won the Fast Forward.
- This season's first Detour was a choice between Wings and Wheels. In Wings, teams had to board a plane, climb to an altitude of over 10,000 feet (3,000 m), and then each team member had to skydive in tandem with an instructor to receive their next clue. In Wheels, teams had to choose a donkey-drawn cart and use a supplied map to direct a driver, who didn't speak English, along a seven-mile (11 km) course to receive the next clue.
- After the Detour, teams had to drive themselves to the Pit Stop: the Hacienda San Gabriel de las Palmas in Puente de Ixtla.

=== Leg 2 (Mexico) ===
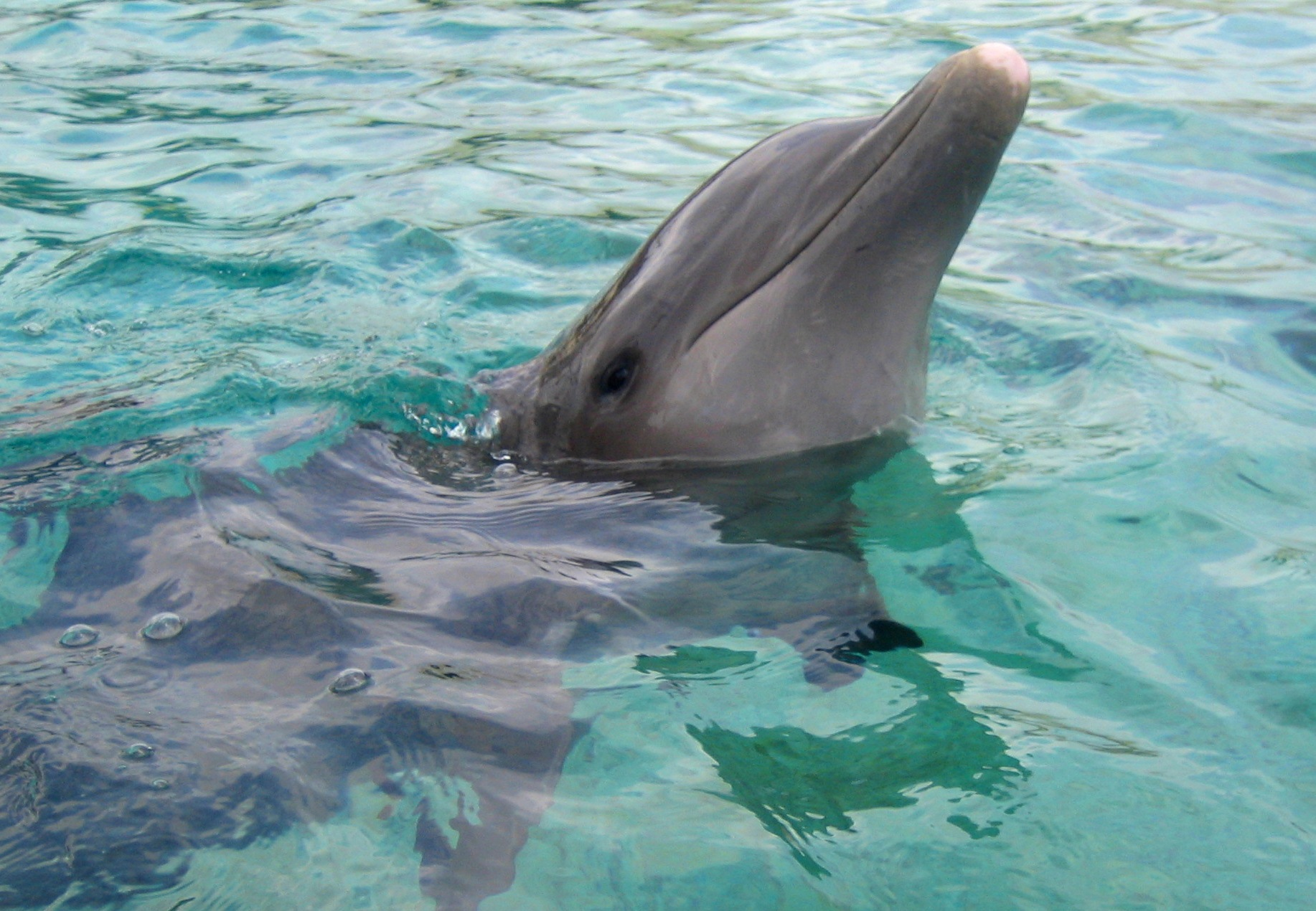
For the Roadblock in Cozumel in the Riviera Maya, team members had to swim with dolphins.

- Episode 2: "This Seems Like the Path Straight to Hell!" (October 9, 2002)
- Eliminated: Tramel and Talicia

Locations

- Puente de Ixtla (Hacienda San Gabriel de las Palmas)
- Mexico City (National Museum of Anthropology)
- Teotihuacan (Pyramid of the Sun)
- Mexico City → Cancún
- Cancún (San Marino Marina)
- Cancún (Las Velas Beach Club Marina)
- Playa del Carmen → Cozumel
- Cozumel (Chankanaab Park)
- Cozumel → Playa del Carmen
- Tulum (Diamante K Bungalows)

Episode summary

- At the start of this leg, teams had to drive themselves to the Pyramid of the Sun in Teotihuacan, climb up to the top of the pyramid, and retrieve their next clue, which instructed them to travel by bus to Cancún and find their next clue at the San Marino marina.
- This leg's Fast Forward required one team to travel to the National Museum of Anthropology in Mexico City and join a group of performers called the Voladores by climbing a 100-foot (30 m) pole and swinging around the pole while suspended on ropes. Derek and Drew won the Fast Forward.
- This leg's Detour was a choice between Man Power and Horse Power. In Man Power, teams had to use a kayak to search a small section of the lagoon for their next clue, which was hanging from a tree. In Horse Power, teams had to use a WaveRunner to search a large section of the lagoon for their next clue, which was attached to a buoy.
- After the Detour, teams had to land at the marina and then drive to Playa del Carmen, where they boarded a ferry to the island of Cozumel. From there, teams had to find Chankanaab Park to find their next clue.
- In this season's first Roadblock, one team member had to jump into the lagoon and swim with a pod of dolphins to find their next clue.
- After the Roadblock, teams had to return to Playa del Carmen via ferry and then drive to the Pit Stop: the Diamante K Bungalows in Tulum.

=== Leg 3 (Mexico → England → Scotland) ===
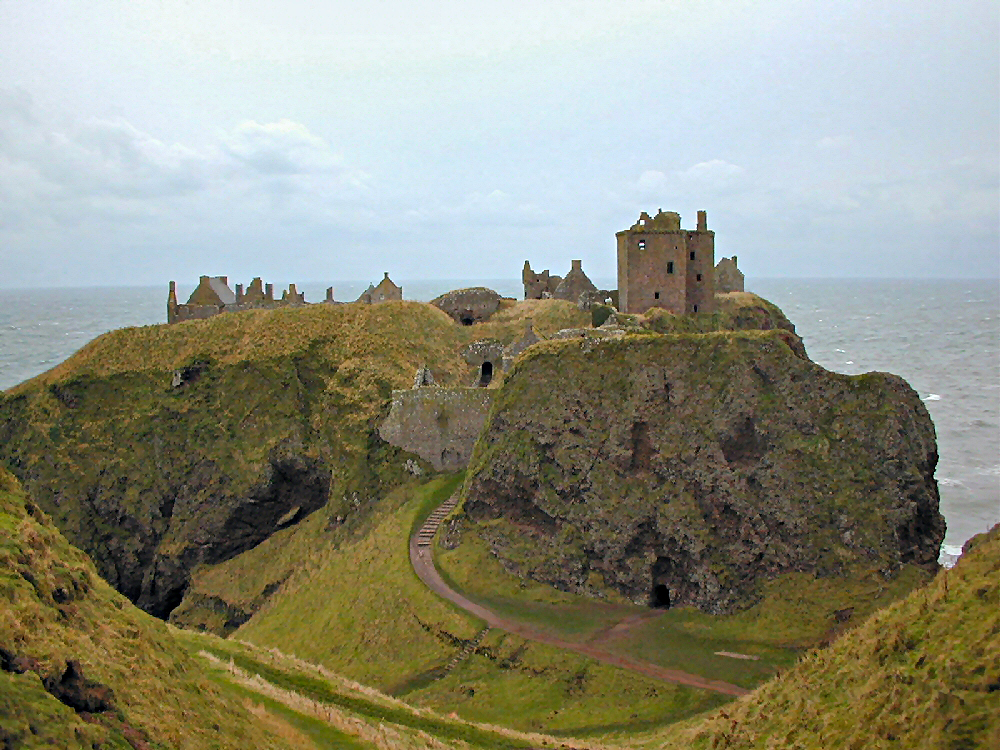
Dunnotar Castle in Stonehaven, Scotland, was the location of both the Roadblock and the Pit Stop on this leg.

- Episode 3: "You Always Just Forget About Me!" (October 16, 2002)
- Eliminated: Dennis and Andrew

Locations

- Tulum (Diamante K Bungalows)
- Cancún → London, England
- London → Cambridge
- Duxford (Duxford Imperial War Museum)
- Cambridge (Scudamore's Punting Cambridge)
- Cambridge (Magdalene Bridge)
- Cambridge (Parker's Piece) → Aberdeen, Scotland
- Stonehaven (Dunnottar Castle)

Episode summary

- At the start of this leg, teams were instructed to fly to London, England. Once there, teams had to travel by train to Cambridge and find their next clue outside Scudamore's Punting.
- This leg's Fast Forward required one team to travel to the Duxford Imperial War Museum and maneuver a tank through a battlefield obstacle course within 90 seconds. Dennis & Andrew won the Fast Forward and were driven to Dunnottar Castle in a limousine.
- This leg's Detour was a choice between Punt and Bike. In Punt, teams rowed a punt with only a long pole and a small paddle to navigate down the River Cam. In Bike, teams rode a tandem bicycle along a marked course through Cambridge. After either Detour task, the team retrieved their next clue from under the Magdalene Bridge.
- After the Detour, teams had to take one of three charter buses leaving the next day to Aberdeen, Scotland, and then find their next clue at Dunnottar Castle.
- In this leg's Roadblock, one team member had to complete three Highland games: the caber toss, the hammer throw, and the stone put. Once done, teams could go directly to the nearby Pit Stop at Dunnottar Castle.

Additional note

- Dennis and Andrew had difficulty booking a flight from Mexico City to London and arrived long after the other teams. Even though they won the Fast Forward, they still arrived at Dunnottar Castle last and were eliminated.

=== Leg 4 (Scotland → Portugal) ===
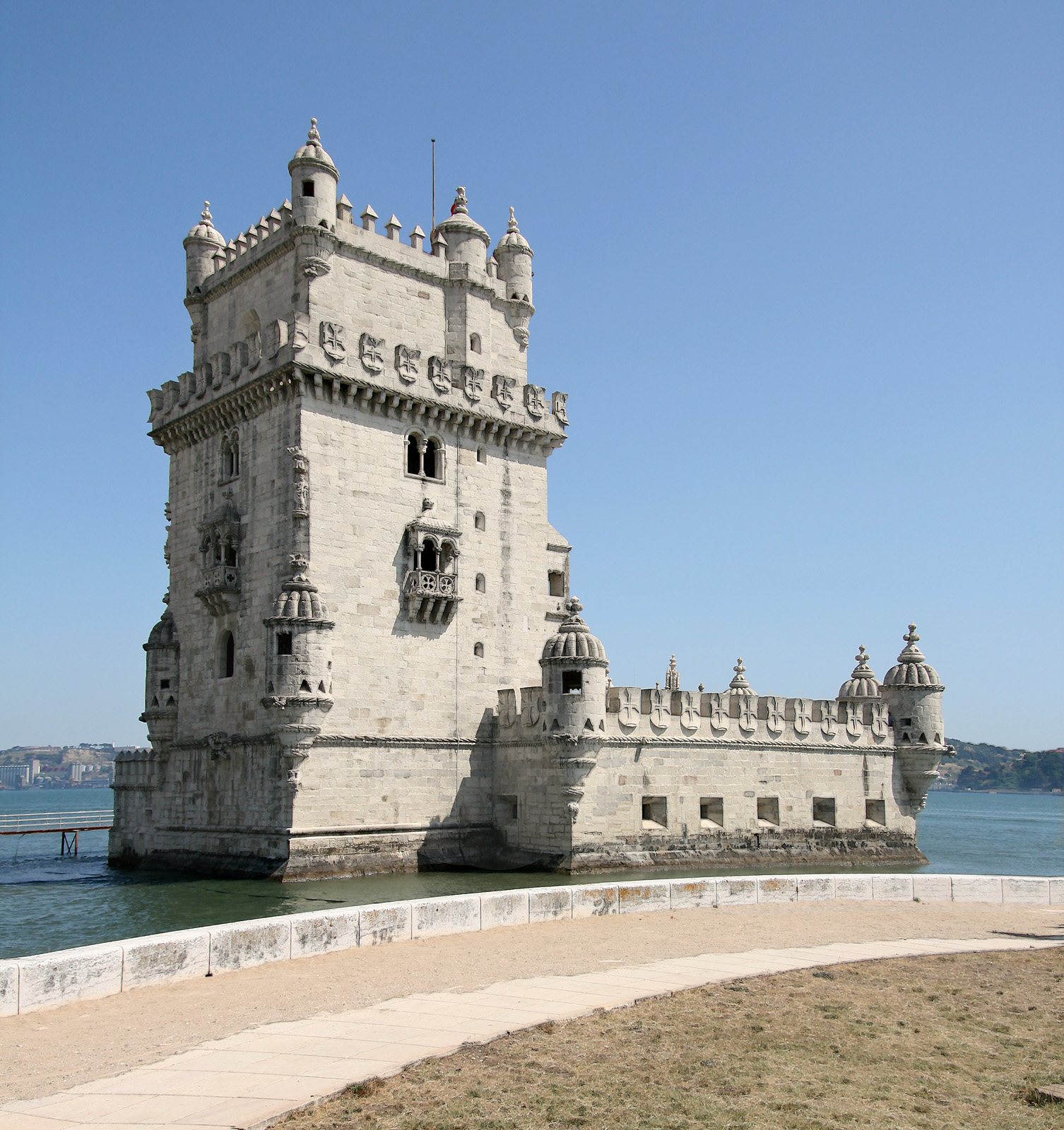
The Torre de Belém in Lisbon was the fourth Pit Stop of the season.

- Episode 4: "Did You See How I Stopped It? With My Face" (October 23, 2002)
- Eliminated: Heather and Eve

Locations

- Stonehaven (Dunnottar Castle)
- Stonehaven (Stonehaven Harbour)
- Aberdeen → Porto, Portugal
- Vila Nova de Gaia (Calem Port Lodge)
- Porto → Lisbon
- Lisbon (Estádio do Restelo)
- Lisbon (Torre de Belém)

Episode summary

- At the start of this leg, teams had to walk to Stonehaven Harbour and search for a "message in a bottle": a bottle with their next clue on the inside label, which instructed them to fly to Porto, Portugal. Once there, teams had to travel to the Calem Port Lodge, which had their next clue.
- This leg's Detour was a choice between Old School and New School. In Old School, teams had to load a barrel of port wine onto a traditional Portuguese boat, row across the Douro River, and then deliver the wine to a restaurant. In New School, teams loaded nine crates of wine bottles onto a truck and drove them to three different restaurants. For both options, teams had to get signatures from each restaurant to prove that they had made the deliveries correctly and receive their next clue.
- After the Detour, teams were instructed to travel by train to Lisbon and then find their next clue at the Estádio do Restelo.
- In this leg's Roadblock, one team member had to block one penalty kick from a teenage soccer player to receive their next clue.
- After the Roadblock, teams had to travel on foot to the Pit Stop: the Torre de Belém.

Additional note

- Heather and Eve were the first team to arrive at the Pit Stop, but they had misread the clue that told them to walk rather than take a taxi. They received a seven-minute time penalty for the advantage gained, plus an additional thirty-minute penalty. Since all of the other teams arrived less than thirty-seven minutes afterward, Heather and Eve were eliminated.

=== Leg 5 (Portugal → Spain → Morocco) ===
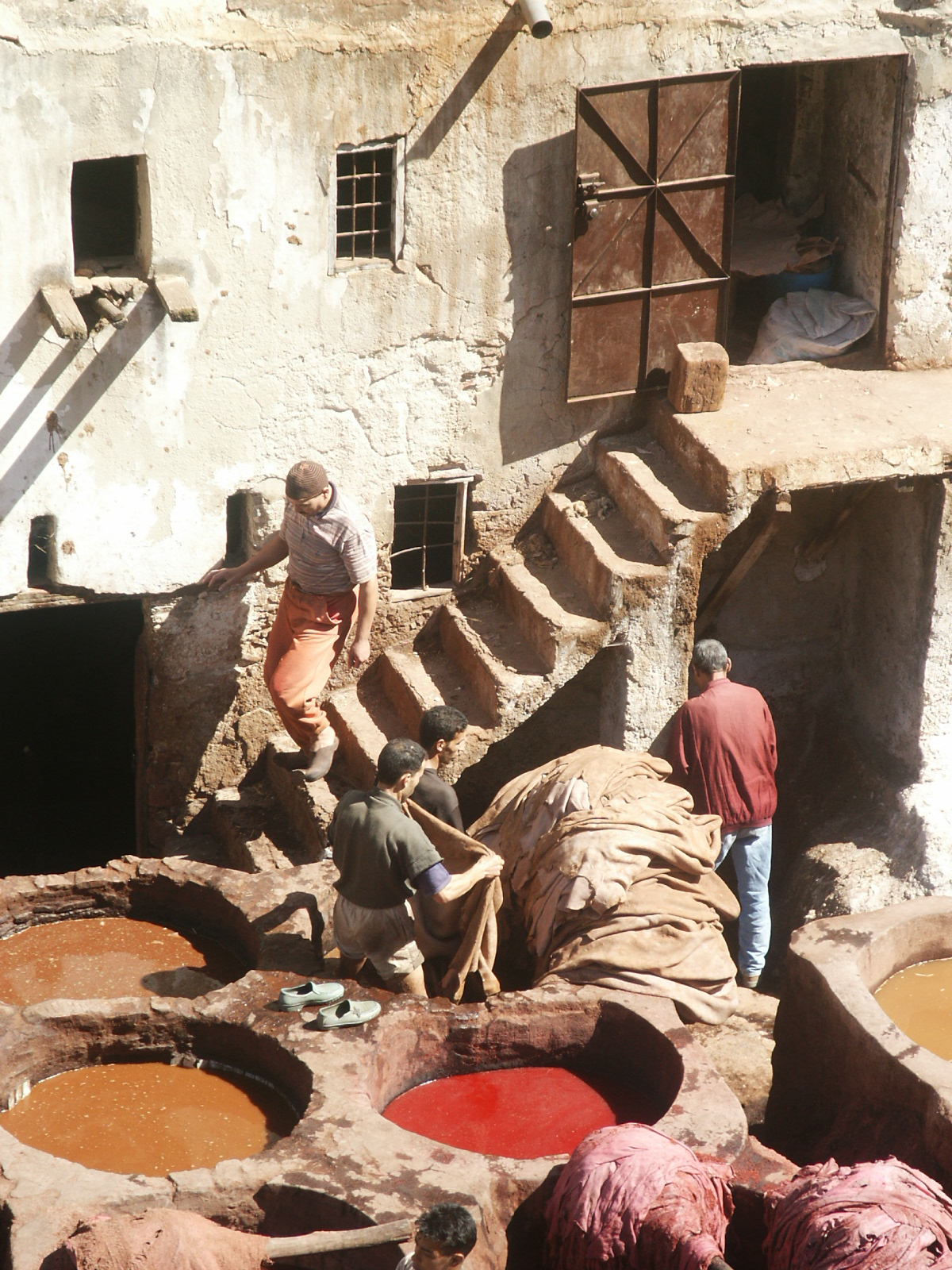
While in Morocco, teams encountered a Roadblock involving the Moroccan traditional dyeing industry.

- Episode 5: "What Happens If I Slip? Am I Just Hanging Off A Cliff?" (October 30, 2002)
- Prize: Two digital cameras (awarded to Ken and Gerard)
- Eliminated: Michael and Kathy

Locations

- Lisbon (Torre de Belém)
- Sintra (Cabo da Roca)
- Algeciras, Spain → Tangier, Morocco
- Tangier (Viajes Flandria) → Fez (Old City)
- Fez (Dar Dbagh Chouara Tannery)
- Fez (Borj Nord)

Episode summary

- At the start of this leg, teams were instructed to travel to the westernmost point of Continental Europe, which they had to figure out was Cabo da Roca, to find their next clue.
- This leg's Detour was a choice between Ropes and Slopes. In Ropes, teams had to take a shuttle bus to the Ursa cliffs and rappel down to the shore below. In Slopes, teams hiked down a long trail to the same shore below. Once teams reached the shore, they could retrieve their next clue.
- After the Detour, teams were instructed to drive to the port in Algeciras, Spain, travel by ferry to Tangier, Morocco, and search the port for next clue. Teams then had to find the Viajes Flandria travel agency and sign up for charter buses to the Old City of Fez, where they had to search for their next clue.
- In this leg's Roadblock, one team member had to find the Dar Dbagh Chouara Tannery and search through 25 vats of dye for their next clue.
- After the Roadblock, teams drove themselves to the Pit Stop: the Borj Nord.

Additional note

- During the drive from Portugal to Algeciras, four of the eight teams incorrectly fueled their cars using unleaded gasoline instead of diesel, rendering the cars inoperable. Teri and Ian recovered almost immediately when Ian borrowed a siphoning line, drained the tank, and refilled with diesel; Flo and Zach found an open repair shop in the middle of the night that fixed their vehicle; Aaron and Arianne called for a tow truck and were taken to a different repair shop after a very long delay; and Kathy and Michael had the car brought back to the station, left it overnight, and became the last team to get underway with a fixed car.

=== Leg 6 (Morocco) ===
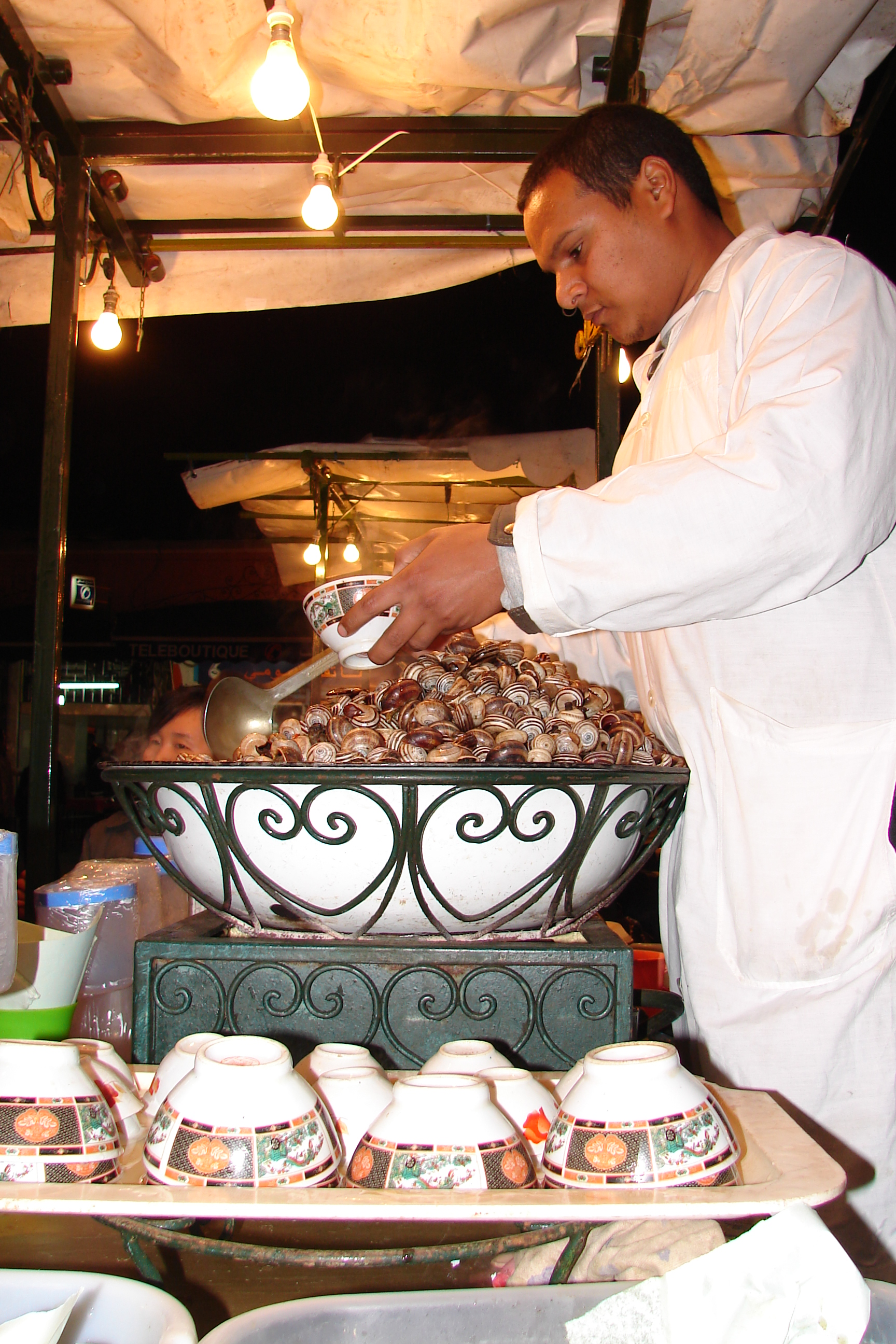
In this leg's Roadblock in Marrakesh, one team member had to sell bowls of escargots.

- Episode 6: "I'm a Much Better Liar Than You Are" (November 13, 2002)
- Prize: Two digital cameras (awarded to Teri and Ian)
- Eliminated: Aaron and Arianne

Locations

- Fez (Borj Nord)
- Casablanca (Hassan II Mosque)
- Casablanca → Marrakesh
- Marrakesh (Jemaa el-Fnaa Market)
- Annakhil (Palmeraie Oasis)
- Marrakesh (Café Glacier)
- Marrakesh (Riad Catalina)

Episode summary

- At the start of this leg, teams had to drive themselves to the Hassan II Mosque in Casablanca, where they found their next clue. They were instructed to travel by train to Marrakesh and then travel to the Palmeraie Oasis, where they found their next clue.
- This leg's Fast Forward required one team to look through piles of carpets in a carpet shop to find the one with the Fast Forward design sewn into it. Teri and Ian won the Fast Forward.
- This leg's Detour was a choice between Now You See It and Now You Don't. In Now You See It, teams would have ridden on horseback to a route marker visible from their starting point and dug up a clue in a marked square of sand. In Now You Don't, teams chose a sand bike and rode to a route marker that wasn't visible from their starting point, where they found a clue etched on a stone. They had to make a rubbing of the clue onto a piece of paper. All teams chose Now You Don't.
- After the Detour, teams had to translate their clue from Arabic to find their next clue at the Café Glacier.
- In this leg's Roadblock, one team member had to team up with a food vendor, help assemble their stall, and then sell five bowls of escargots to receive their next clue, which directed them to the Pit Stop: the Riad Catalina.

Additional note

- Andre and Damon were officially detained when their taxi took them far out of the way in Morocco, and they encountered a local official who wanted to seize their passports. Andre and Damon refused, and the show's security team had to come and extricate them from the situation.

=== Leg 7 (Morocco → Germany & Austria) ===
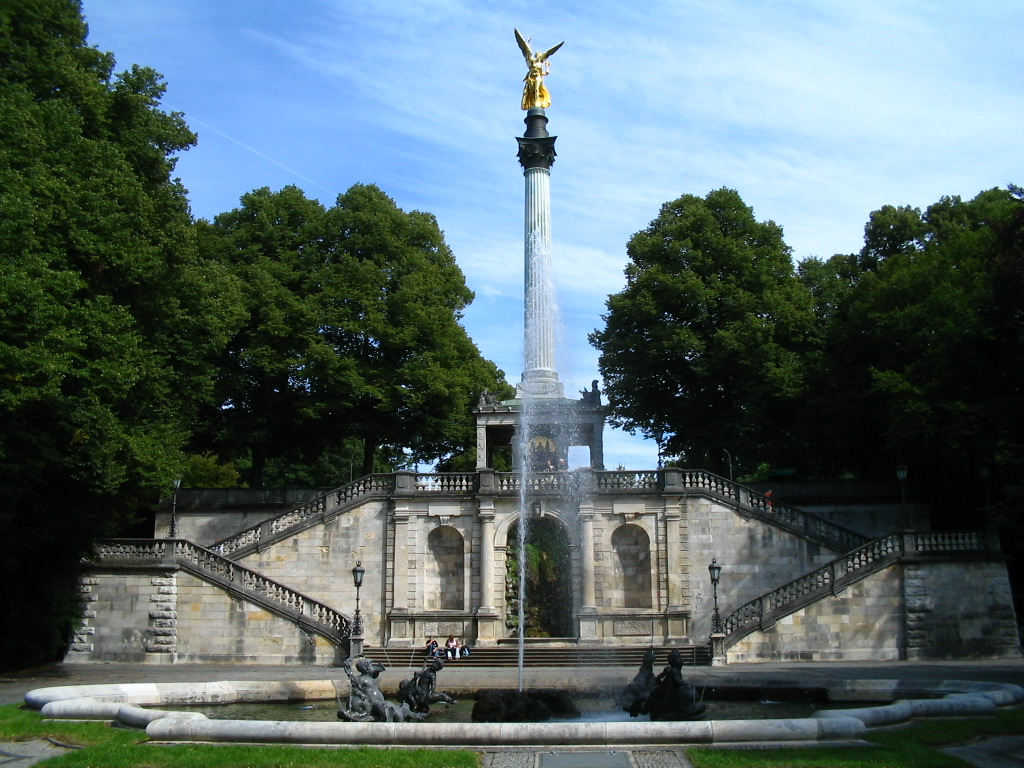
Teams traveled to the Friedensengel in Munich.

- Episode 7: "I'm Supposed to Be Indebted to Her for the Rest of the Race?!" (November 20, 2002)
- Prize: Two digital cameras (awarded to Flo and Zach)
- Eliminated: Andre and Damon

Locations

- Marrakesh (Riad Catalina)
- Marrakesh or Casablanca → Munich, Germany
- Munich (Friedensengel)
- Munich (Eisbach River)
- Munich → Innsbruck, Austria
- Innsbruck (Annasäule)
- Innsbruck (Olympic Bobsled Track)
- Innsbruck (Hungerburg Station → Seegrube Station)
- Schwangau, Germany (Schloss Bullachberg)

Episode summary

- At the start of this leg, teams were instructed to fly to Munich, Germany. Once there, teams had to travel to the Angel of Peace (German: Friedensengel) and find a puppet named Kasperle, who handed them their next clue. Teams were then instructed to travel by train to Innsbruck, Austria, where they found their next clue at the St. Anne's Column (German: Annasäule).
- This leg's Fast Forward required one team to find a surfer on the Eisbach River in Munich. Flo and Zach won the Fast Forward.
- This leg's Detour was a choice between Sled and Skate. In Sled, teams had to ride a bobsled with a team of professional bobsledders down the Olympic Bobsled Track to receive their next clue. In Skate, teams would have had to run a skating relay with a pair of professional ice skaters at the Olympic Ice Stadium to receive their next clue. All teams chose Sled.
- After the Detour, teams had to ride the Nordkette Cable Car to the Seegrube Station to find their next clue.
- In this leg's Roadblock, one team member had to put on safety gear and descend 230 feet (70 m) to the ground on a rescue cable to receive their next clue.
- After the Roadblock, teams had to drive themselves to the Pit Stop: Schloss Bullachberg, located beneath Neuschwanstein Castle, in Schwangau, Germany.

Additional note

- Andre and Damon fell so far behind, due in part to their delay in the previous leg and also due to falling asleep on the train from Munich to Innsbruck and missing their stop, that all of the other teams had already checked into the Pit Stop before Andre and Damon arrived at the Detour. Instead of performing the Detour, they were instructed to go directly to the Pit Stop for elimination.

=== Leg 8 (Germany → Switzerland) ===
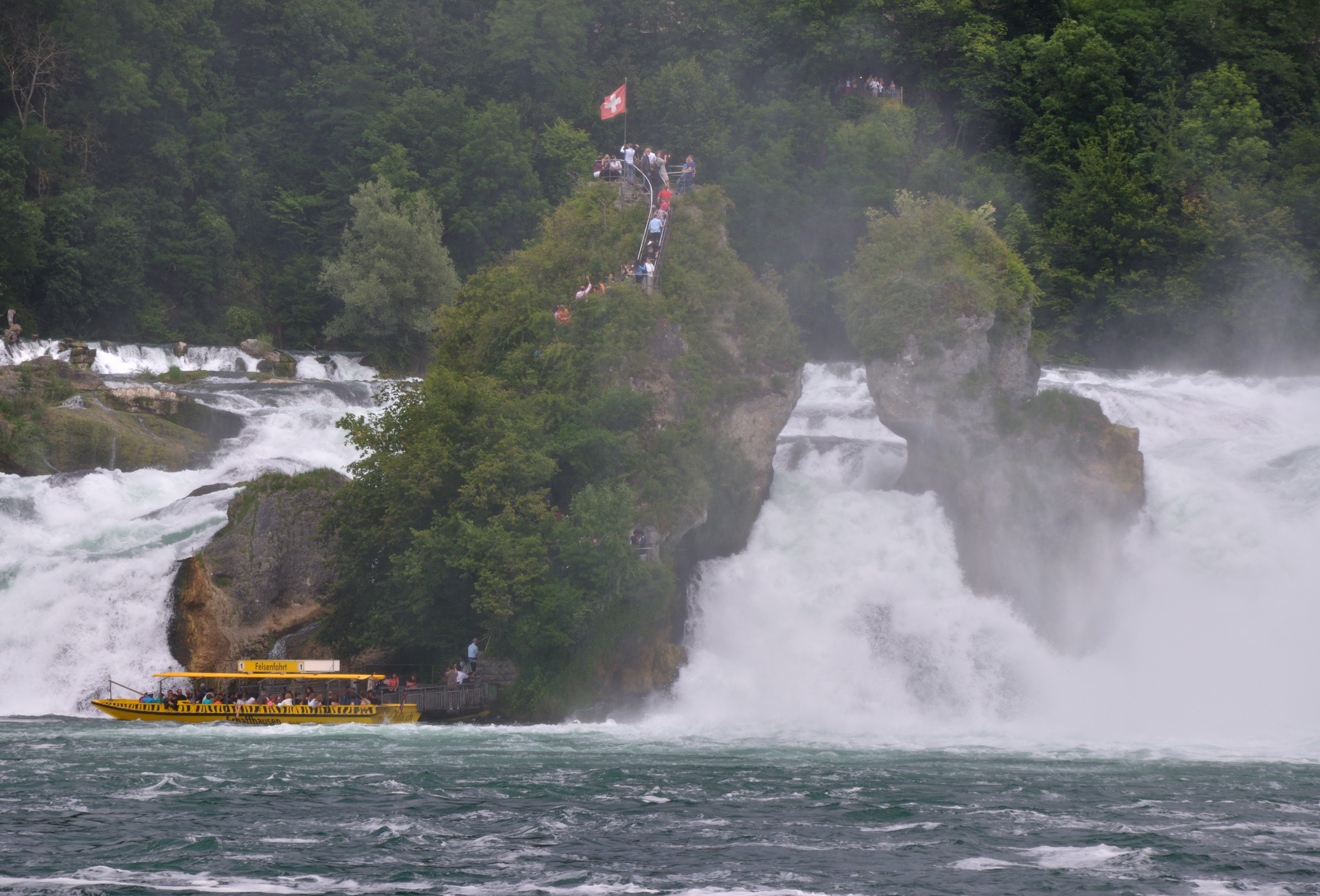
While in Switzerland, teams visited the Rheinfall.

- Episode 8: "This Is More Important Than Your Pants Falling Down!" (November 27, 2002)
- Prize: Two digital cameras (awarded to Derek and Drew)

Locations

- Schwangau (Schloss Bullachberg)
- Füssen (Augustinerhof Farm)
- Friedrichshafen → Romanshorn, Switzerland
- Romanshorn → Schaffhausen
- Neuhausen am Rheinfall (Rheinfall)
- Schaffhausen → Zurich
- Zürich (Lindenhof)
- Zürich → Grindelwald
- Grindelwald (Field)
- Grindelwald (Chalet Arnika)

Episode summary

- At the start of this leg, teams traveled to the Augustinerhof Farm in Füssen and searched a large haystack for their next clue. Teams were instructed to drive to Friedrichshafen and then travel by ferry to Romanshorn, Switzerland. Once there, teams had to travel by train to Schaffhausen and continue to the Rheinfall, where they had to travel by ferry and retrieve their clue from the top of a rocky outcropping in the middle of the waterfall. Teams were then instructed to travel by train to Zürich. At the Lindenhof, teams searched for a Swiss officer, who led them into a vault with their next clue.
- This leg's Detour was a choice between Count the Money and Run the Numbers. In Count the Money, teams had to count a large amount of Swiss currency inside a fishbowl sitting right next to the safe. In Run the Numbers, teams had to search the streets of Zürich for three different numbers: the number on the Züri-Familie sculpture at the intersection of Sihlstrasse and Bahnhofstrasse, the sum of the numbers on the north face of a clock on St. Peter's Church, and the number of trees in Lindenhof marked with ribbons. The resulting numbers from both tasks formed the combination to the safe that contained the next clue. All teams chose to perform Run the Numbers, although Ken and Gerard did begin Count the Money until they gave up in frustration.
- After the Detour, teams had to travel by train to Grindelwald and then find a route marker in a field east of the railway station, where they found their next clue.
- In this leg's Roadblock, one team member had to use a crossbow to shoot an apple off a mannequin's head to receive their next clue, which directed them to the Pit Stop: the Chalet Arnika.

Additional note

- This was a non-elimination leg.

=== Leg 9 (Switzerland) ===
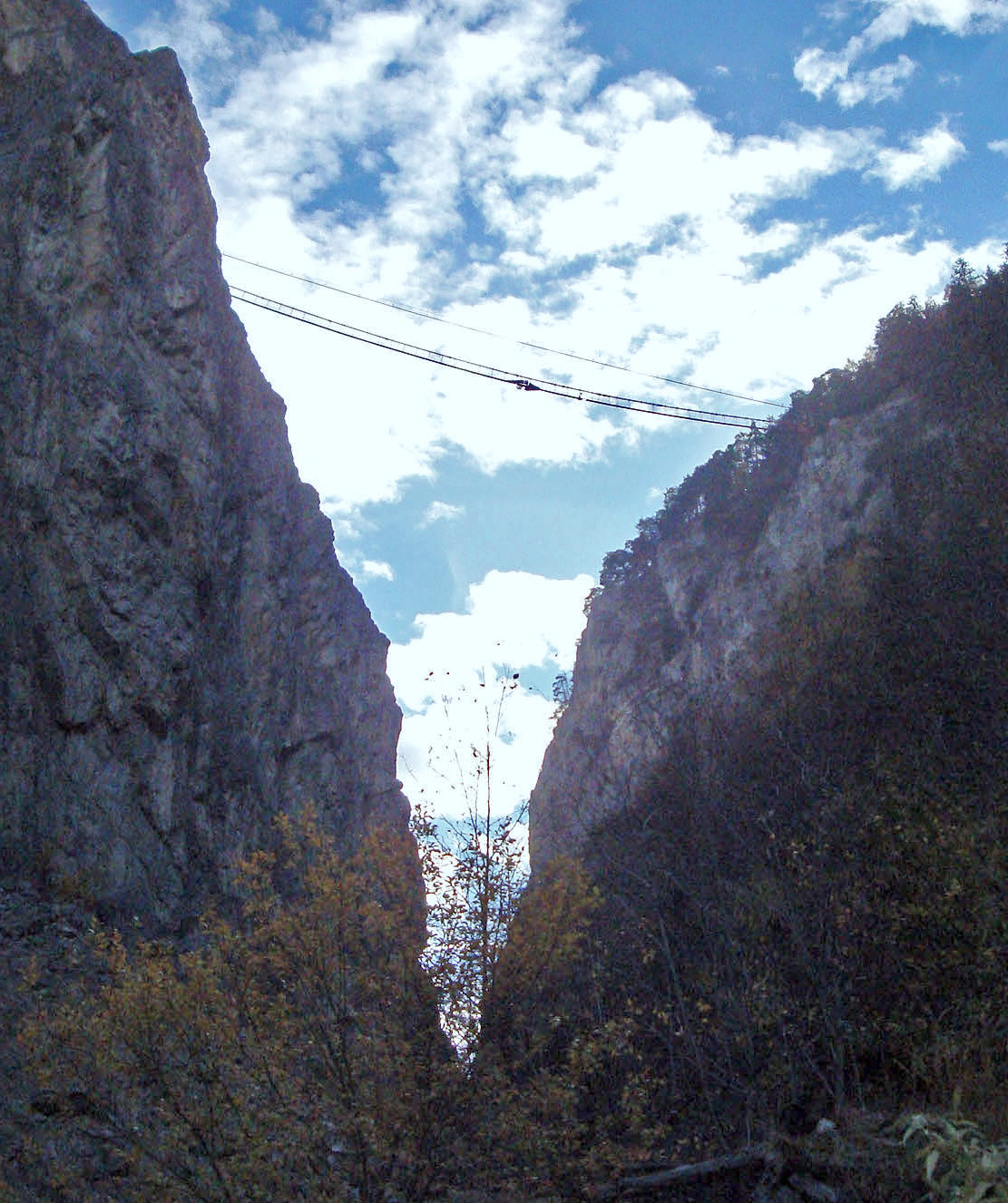
One side of the Detour in Switzerland's Valais region required teams to cross the Niouc Bridge and then perform a bungee jump.

- Episode 9: "Why Did You Have to Take Your Pants Off?" (December 4, 2002)
- A seven-night Caribbean cruise (awarded to John Vito and Jill)

Locations

- Grindelwald (Chalet Arnika)
- Grindelwald (Gletscherschlucht)
- Saxeten (Cheese-Making Cabin)
- Kandersteg → Goppenstein
- Niouc (Val d'Anniviers – Niouc Bridge)
- Veytaux (Château de Chillon)
- Veytaux (Château de Chillon) → Montreux (Basset Marina)
- Montreux (Basset Marina) → Lake Geneva (Savoie)

Episode summary

- At the start of this leg, teams had to travel to the Gletscherschlucht. There, they had to venture into the gorge to find a key to one of the provided cars containing their next clue.
- This season's final Fast Forward required one team to find a cheese-making cabin near Saxeten and eat enough pieces of Swiss cheese from a massive cheese wheel so as to completely reveal the Fast Forward award hidden underneath. John Vito and Jill won the Fast Forward.
- Teams who were unable to attempt the Fast Forward had to drive to Kandersteg, where they loaded their car onto a car train and rode through the Alps to Goppenstein. Teams then had to drive to the Niouc Bridge, where they found their next clue.
- This leg's Detour was a choice between Extreme Swiss and Very Swiss. In Extreme Swiss, each team member had to walk onto a narrow bridge and bungee jump into the gorge below to receive their next clue. In Very Swiss, teams had to drive to a nearby farm and then find a key inside the bell around a goat's neck to unlock their next clue.
- After the Detour, teams had the option to make one phone call to their family or friends back home, but they had to complete the call before they could continue to their next destination: the Château de Chillon in Veytaux.
- In this leg's Roadblock, one team member had to properly assemble a Swiss army bicycle from a pile of parts using an identical pre-assembled bike as a reference to receive their next clue.
- After the Roadblock, teams had to ride both bicycles to the Basset Marina in Montreux. There, teams had to use a paddle boat to reach the Pit Stop aboard the steamship Savoie, which was floating on Lake Geneva.

Additional note

- This was a non-elimination leg.

=== Leg 10 (Switzerland → Malaysia → Singapore) ===
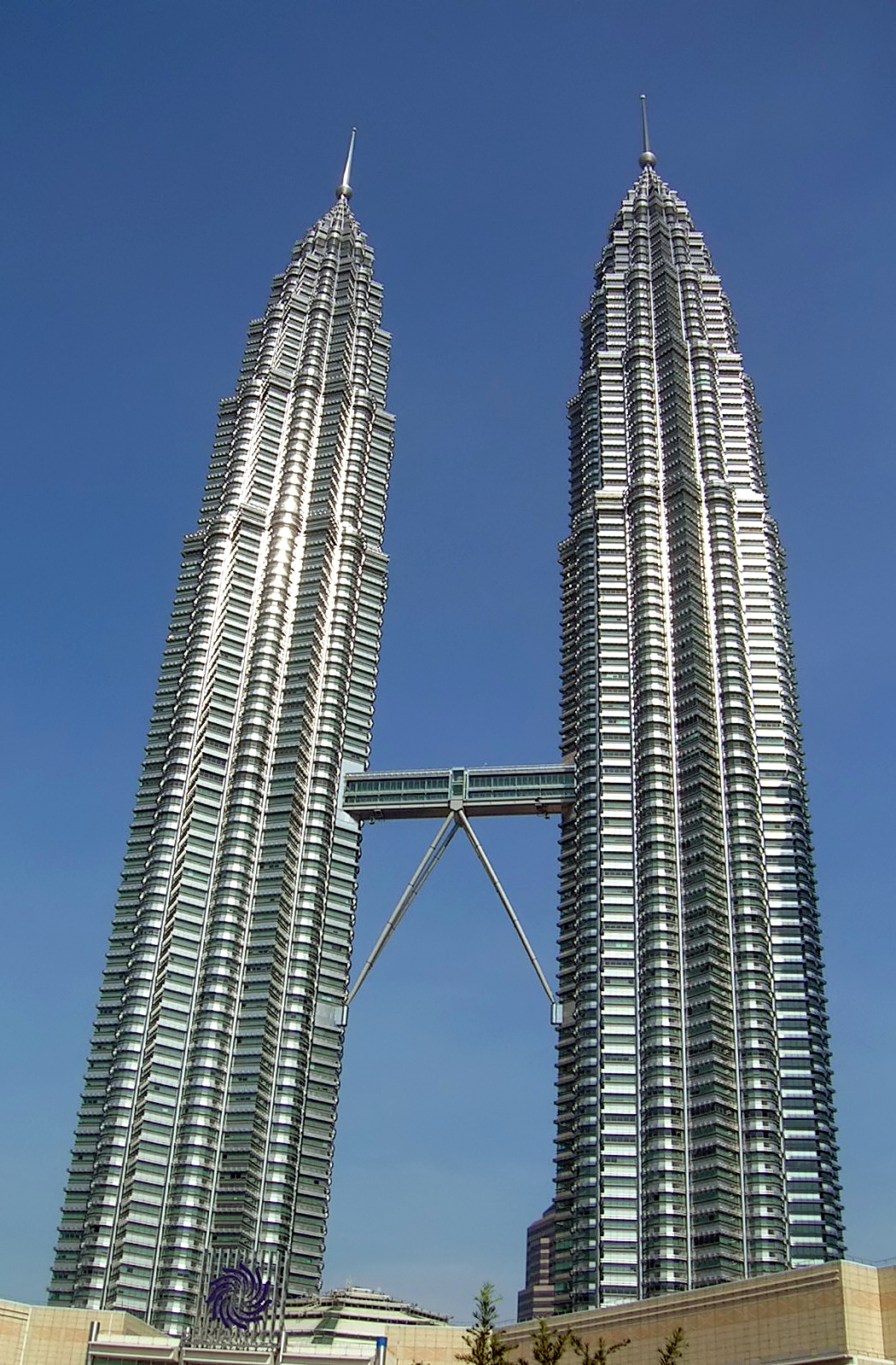
In Kuala Lumpur, teams had to convince a local to photograph them in front of the Petronas Towers.

- Episode 9: "Why Did You Have to Take Your Pants Off?" (December 4, 2002)
- Prize: A seven-night European cruise (awarded to Derek and Drew)
- Eliminated: John Vito and Jill

Locations

- Montreux → Lausanne (Ouchy)
- Geneva (Jet d'Eau)
- Geneva → Kuala Lumpur, Malaysia
- Kuala Lumpur (Petronas Towers)
- Kuala Lumpur (Ampang Park Shopping Center)
- Kuala Lumpur → Singapore
- Singapore (Singapore Botanic Gardens – National Orchid Garden)
- Singapore (Choa Chu Kang HDB Apartments or Singapore Zoo)
- Singapore (Suntec City – Fountain of Wealth)
- Singapore (Mount Faber)

Episode summary

- Before the leg began, the steamship Savoie sailed from Montreux to Lausanne. At the start of this leg, teams had to travel to the Jet d'Eau in Geneva, where they received a small flag representing their next destination – – and instructions to find the Petronas Towers. Using this information, teams had to figure out that their next clue was in Kuala Lumpur, Malaysia.
- At the Petronas Towers, teams had have their picture taken in front of the towers using a digital camera. Teams then had to walk to the Ampang Park shopping center, where they developed their pictures and found their next clue printed on the back of the photo. Teams were then instructed to travel by train to Singapore and search the National Orchid Garden of the Singapore Botanic Gardens for an orchid called "Margaret Thatcher" to find their next clue.
- This leg's Detour was a choice between Dry and Wet. In Dry, teams drove to an apartment block in Choa Chu Kang. From there, they had to locate Unit #10-137, where they met Singaporean TV star Gurmit Singh, in his alter ego Phua Chu Kang, who handed them their next clue. In Wet, teams had to drive to the Singapore Zoo and find the "Mermaids of the Sea": the zoo's manatees. Once at the manatee enclosure, they had to swim through the pool to receive their next clue.
- At Suntec City, one team member had to run three times around the center of the Fountain of Wealth before retrieving their next clue from the middle of the fountain. Afterwards, teams had to check in at the Pit Stop: Mount Faber.

Additional notes

- Miss Singapore Universe 2001, Jaime Teo, appeared as the Pit Stop greeter.
- Legs 9 and 10 aired back-to-back as a special two-hour episode.

=== Leg 11 (Singapore → Vietnam) ===
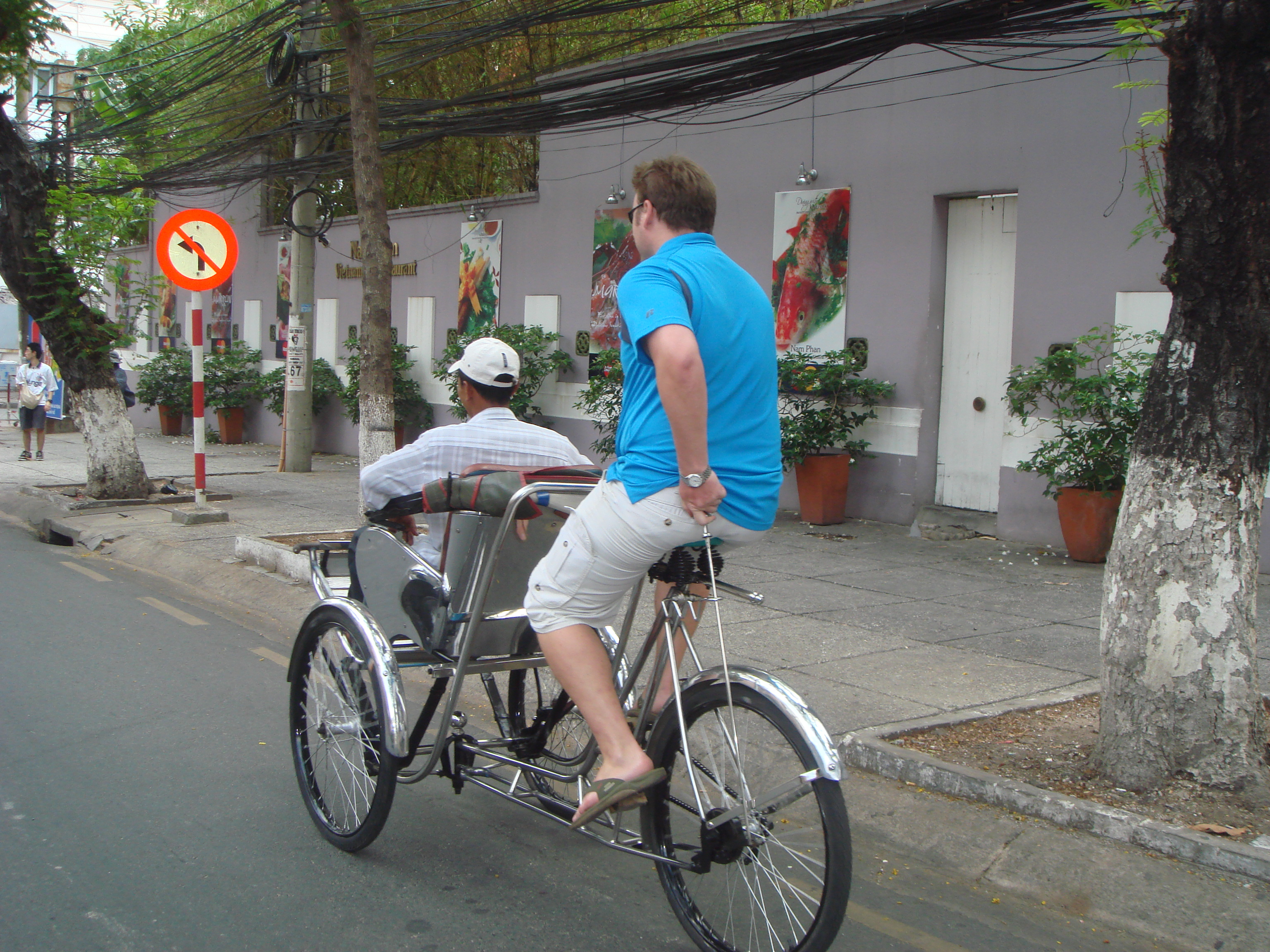
Cyclos, a form of Vietnamese transportation, were featured during the Roadblock.

- Episode 10: "Don't Try to Play the Moralist Now!" (December 11, 2002)
- Prize: A seven-night European cruise (awarded to Teri and Ian)
- Eliminated: Derek and Drew

Locations

- Singapore (Mount Faber)
- Singapore → Ho Chi Minh City, Vietnam
- Ho Chi Minh City (Rex Square – Bac Ho Statue)
- Cái Bè (Mekong Delta)
- Cái Bè (Floating Market or Land Market)
- Ho Chi Minh City (2A Tôn Đức Thắng Boulevard)
- Ho Chi Minh City (Café Thu Thiem)

Episode summary

- At the start of this leg, teams were instructed to fly to Ho Chi Minh City, Vietnam. Once there, teams had to travel to the statue of Bac Ho in Rex Square to find their next clue, which directed teams to the Mekong Delta in Cái Bè.
- This leg's Detour was a choice between Easy Buy and Hard Sell. In Easy Buy, teams had to a traditional boat called a sampan into the floating market of Cái Bè and find the only vendor selling water coconuts, from whom they received their next clue. In Hard Sell, teams had to carry shoulder baskets with fruit into the land market so as to sell enough fruit to make 40,000₫ (roughly $2.50) that they could exchange for their next clue.
- After the Detour, teams had to travel to 2A Ton Duc Thang Street to find their next clue.
- In this leg's Roadblock, one team member had to transport their teammate on a cyclo along a marked course through the streets of Ho Chi Minh City and onto a ferry across the Saigon River to the Pit Stop: the Café Thu Thiem.

Additional note

- All route markers in Vietnam were colored solid yellow instead of red and yellow to avoid confusion with the former South Vietnamese national flag, which was also red and yellow.

=== Leg 12 (Vietnam) ===
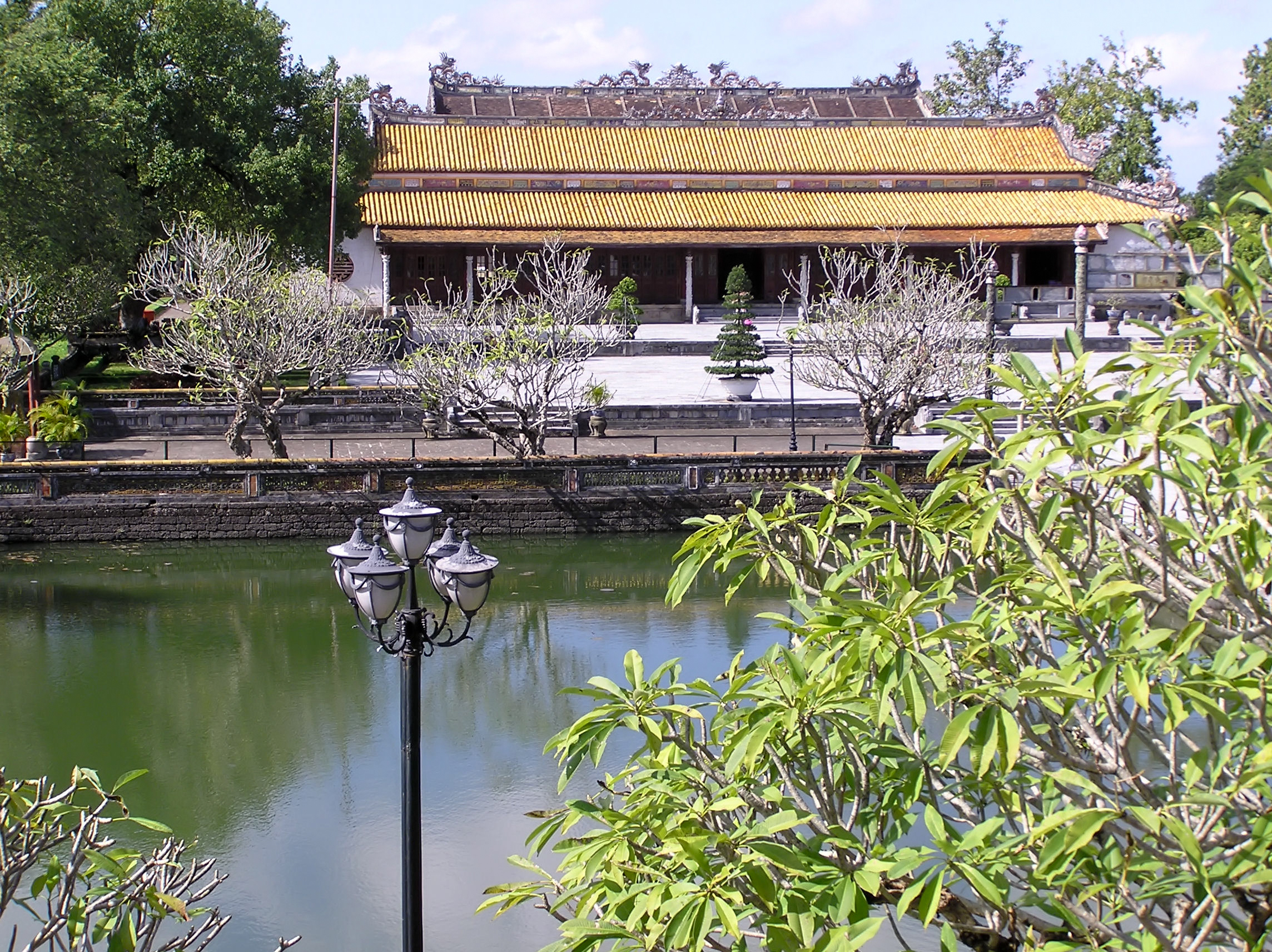
Teams visited the Imperial Palace in Huế during this leg.

- Episode 11: "They're Slithering to the Finish Line Like the Rest of Us!" (December 18, 2002)
- Prize: A seven-night Alaskan cruise (awarded to Teri and Ian)

Locations

- Ho Chi Minh City (Café Thu Thiem)
- Ho Chi Minh City → Huế
- Huế (Imperial City – Hiển Lâm Các Pavilion)
- Da Nang (Nam Ô – Bridge)
- Hội An (Bach Dang Street Boat Quay → Thu Bồn River)
- Hội An (Thu Bồn River – Fishing Platform)
- Da Nang (China Beach)

Episode summary

- At the start of this leg, teams were instructed to travel by train to Huế. Once there, teams had to search the Hiển Lâm Các Pavilion inside the Imperial City for their next clue. Teams then had to travel to the bridge in Nam Ô to find their next clue.
- This leg's Detour was a choice between Basket Boats and Basket Bikes. In Basket Boats, each team member had to cross a stretch of the Cu Đê River in a round basket boat using only a single paddle to reach the clue box on a nearby island. In Basket Bikes, each team member took a bicycle laden with dozens of shrimp baskets and had to ride one mile (1.6 km) to receive their next clue.
- After the Detour, teams had to go to the Bach Dang dock in Hội An and board a sampan that took them to a route marker on the Thu Bồn River.
- In this leg's Roadblock, one team member had to climb onto a fishing platform, use a wooden winch to raise a fishing net out of the water, and retrieve the clue dangling underneath, which directed them to the Pit Stop: China Beach in Da Nang.

Additional notes

- The Detour task involving the bicycle and shrimp baskets was revisited in season 29 as a Switchback.
- This was a non-elimination leg.

=== Leg 13 (Vietnam → United States) ===
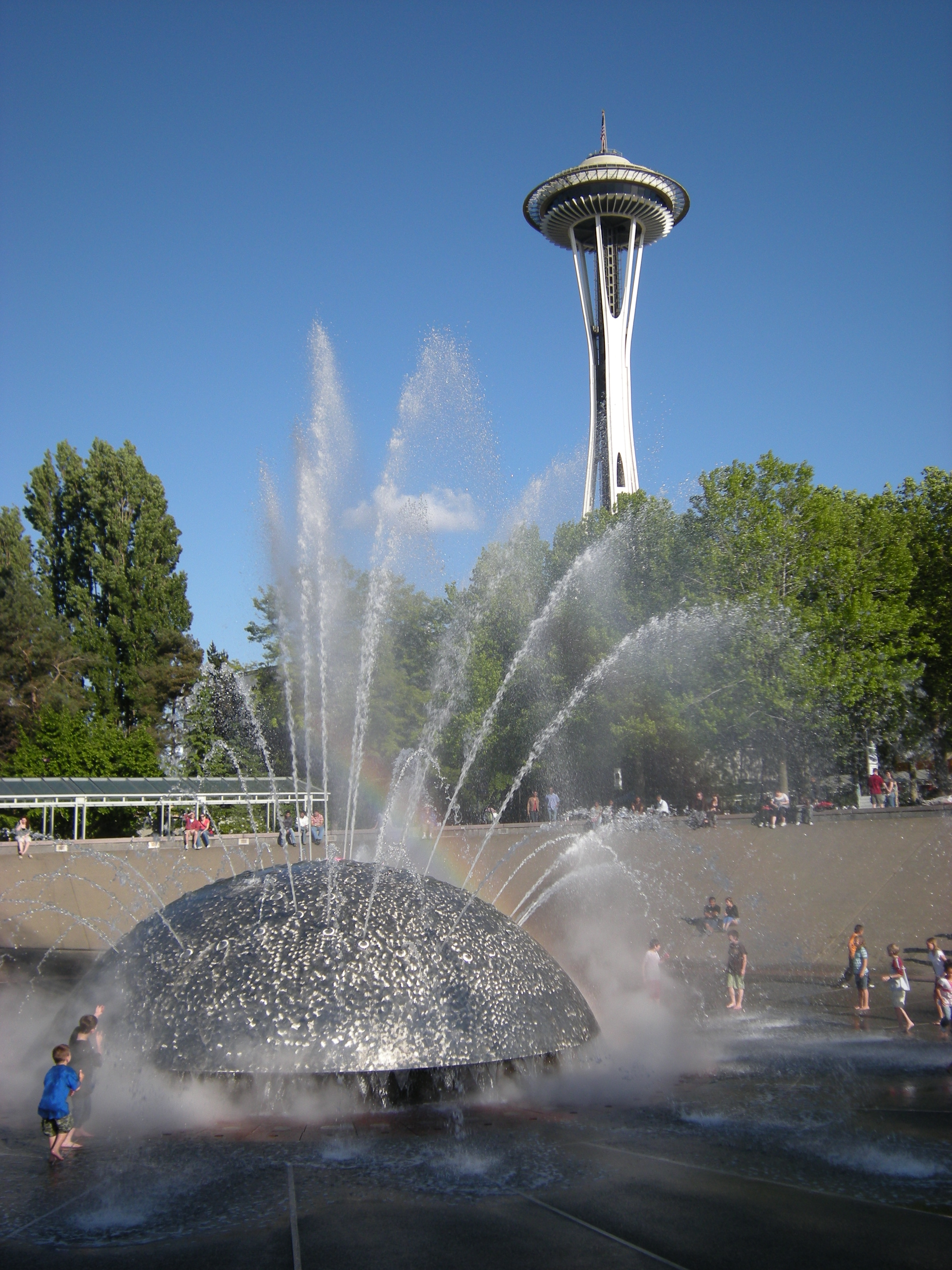
Teams traveled to the International Fountain in Seattle during the last leg of the race.

- Episode 11: "They're Slithering to the Finish Line Like the Rest of Us!" (December 18, 2002)
- Prize: US$1,000,000
- Winners: Flo and Zach
- Runners-up: Teri and Ian
- Third place: Ken and Gerard

Locations

- Da Nang (China Beach)
- Da Nang (Quang Minh Temple)
- Da Nang → Hanoi
- Hanoi → Honolulu, Hawaii
- Haleʻiwa (Puaena Point)
- Honolulu → Līhuʻe
- Wailua River State Park (Wailua Falls)
- Līhuʻe → Seattle, Washington
- Seattle (Kerry Park)
- Seattle (Seattle Center – International Fountain)
- Seattle (Lincoln Park)
- Seattle (Gas Works Park)

Episode summary

- At the start of this leg, teams had to travel to the Quang Minh Temple in Da Nang, where they found their next clue at the Buddha's feet, which instructed them to travel by train to Hanoi and then fly to Honolulu, Hawaii. Once there, teams had to drive to Puaena Point and receive a blessing from a kahuna, who also gave them their next clue. Teams were then instructed to fly to the island of Kauaʻi and drive to Wailua River State Park, where they found their next clue.
- This season's final Detour was a choice between Quick Drop and Slow Walk. In Quick Drop, teams took a quick drop from the top of a waterfall on a zipline. They then had to swim to shore and follow the flags to a clue behind the waterfall. In Slow Walk, teams would have walked down a much longer marked trail to the same clue box behind the waterfall. All teams chose Quick Drop.
- After the Detour, teams were instructed to fly to Seattle, Washington, and find their next clue at Kerry Park. Teams then had to travel on foot to the International Fountain at the Seattle Center, where they found their next clue directing them to Lincoln Park.
- In this season's final Roadblock, one team member had to choose a totem pole and spin the animal faces so that they were aligned in the order that teams encountered them on the race: donkey (Mexico), dolphin (Mexico), horse (Morocco), goat (Switzerland), and manatee (Singapore). Once the animals were in the correct order, the bottom of the totem pole opened to reveal the final clue, which directed teams to the finish line: Gas Works Park.

Additional notes

- Due to Vietnamese law, teams had to book a flight at a travel agency before they could enter Noi Bai International Airport in Hanoi.
- Legs 12 and 13 aired back-to-back as a special two-hour episode.

== Reception ==
The Amazing Race 3 received positive reviews. Linda Holmes of Television Without Pity wrote that this season was good, but that she was not satisfied with the ending. Dalton Ross of Entertainment Weekly praised the unpredictability of this season, writing that "you never truly know what's going to happen." In 2016, this season was ranked 2nd out of the first 27 seasons by the Rob Has a Podcast Amazing Race correspondents. Kareem Gantt of Screen Rant wrote that this season "thrives on team chemistry to hook a viewer in and did this cast lock in their viewers. The locations were also fantastic, and the suspense was at the perfect pitch." In 2021, Jane Andrews of Gossip Cop ranked this season as the show's 6th-best season. In 2023, Rhenn Taguiam of Game Rant ranked this season as the 11th-best season. In 2024, Taguiam's ranking was updated, with this season becoming the fifth-best season.

While reviews for this season were positive, reactions to Flo Pesenti co-winning this season were largely negative. Andy Dehnart of reality blurred was negative towards the win due to Flo "threatening to quit the race repeatedly and shrieking more than a banshee with its leg stuck in a trap". Television Without Pity co-creator Tara Ariano called Flo "malingering". John Crook of the Los Angeles Times called Flo "spoiled" and "petulant".

In 2003, this season of The Amazing Race won the inaugural Primetime Emmy Award for Outstanding Reality Competition Program.

== Ratings ==
No. overall	No. in season	Title	Original release date	U.S. viewers (millions)	Rating/share (18–49)
25	1	"What If Our Parachute Doesn't Open?"	October 2, 2002	9.49	3.9/10
26	2	"This Seems Like the Path Straight to Hell"	October 9, 2002	8.04	3.6/9
27	3	"You Always Just Forget About Me!"	October 16, 2002	9.16	3.9/10
28	4	"Did You See How I Stopped It? In My Face"	October 23, 2002	8.05	3.3/8
29	5	"What Happens If I Slip? Am I Just Hanging Off a Cliff?"	October 30, 2002	7.73	3.1/8
30	6	"I'm a Much Better Liar Than You Are"	November 13, 2002	8.04	3.3/8
31	7	"I'm Supposed to Be Indebted to Her for the Rest of the Race?!"	November 20, 2002	7.80	2.9/8
32	8	"This Is More Important Than Your Pants Falling Down!"	November 27, 2002	9.94	4.2/12
33	9	"Why Did You Have to Take Your Pants Off?"	December 4, 2002	8.99	3.9/10
34	10	"Don't Try to Play the Moralist Now!"	December 11, 2002	9.39	4.0/10
35	11	"They're Slithering to the Finish Line Like the Rest of Us"	December 18, 2002	11.00	4.7/13

== Works cited ==
- Castro, Adam-Troy (2006). My Ox Is Broken!. BenBella Books. ISBN 978-1-932100-91-4.
