= Ian F. Pollack =

American pediatric neurosurgeon

Ian F. Pollack is an American pediatric neurosurgeon. Pollack is currently the A. Leland Albright Distinguished Professor of neurosurgery at University of Pittsburgh. He was previously the chief of pediatric neurosurgery at UPMC Children's Hospital of Pittsburgh.

He has been featured in Who’s Who in America and Who’s Who in the World.

== Education ==
After graduating from Emory University in 1980 with a Bachelors of Science in Chemistry, Pollack attended Johns Hopkins University School of Medicine for his Doctorate of Medicine, graduating in 1984. Between 1990-1992, Pollack completed 5 fellowships.

== Career ==
Pollack's career started at the University of Pittsburgh Department of Neurological Surgery in 1992. Pollack has published nearly 400 papers in pediatric neurosurgery and neuroscience.
