= Hungerburg =

District of Innsbruck, Austria

Coordinates: 47°17′11″N 11°23′49″E

Hungerburg is a district of Innsbruck, Austria. It has a population of 1,005 (as of 2014). It is connected with the city center through a hybrid funicular railway, the Hungerburgbahn, and from Hungerburg the Nordkette Cable Car continues in 2 sections up the mountain, to Seegrube and then to Hafelekar.

== Gallery ==
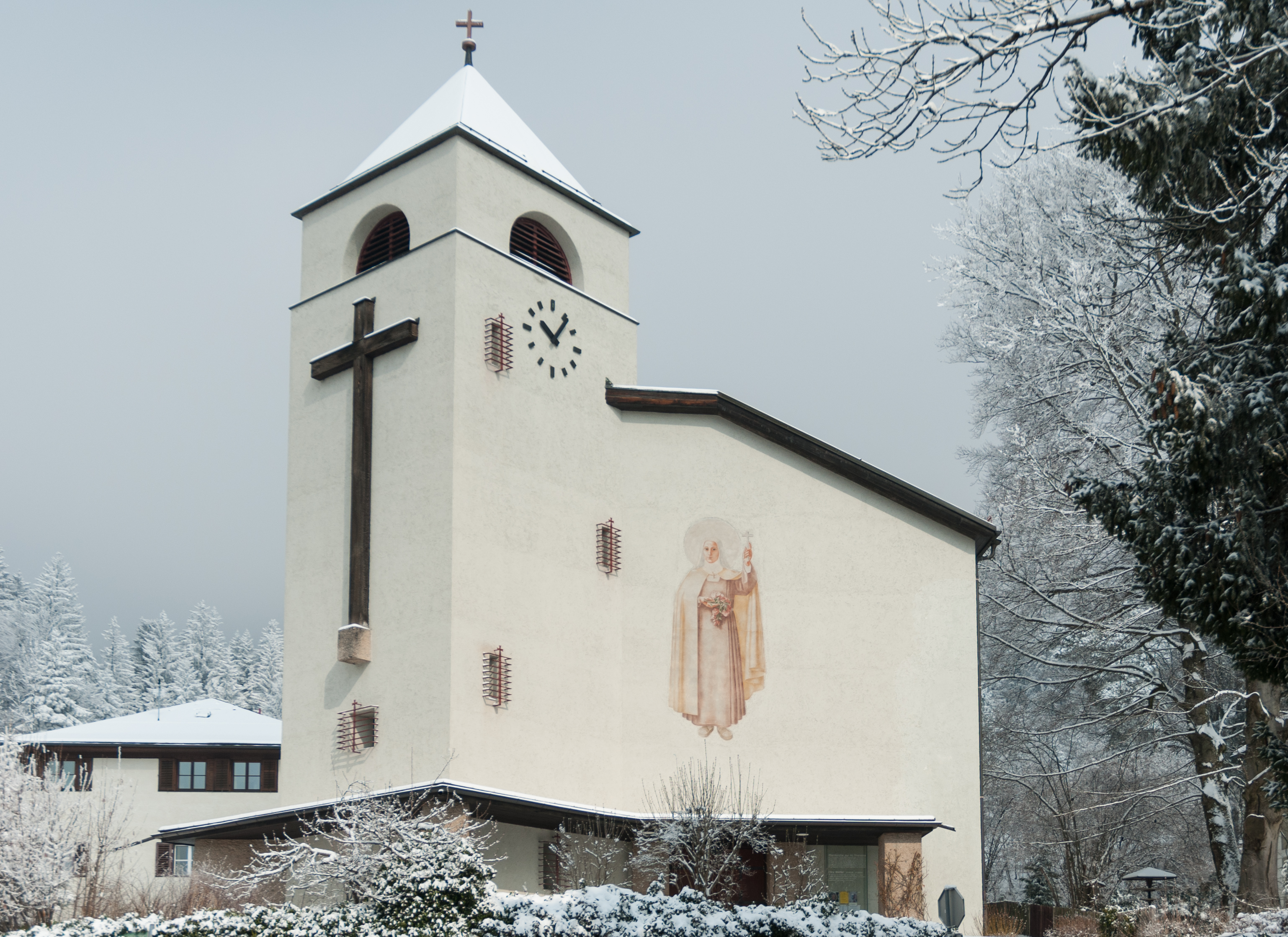
St Theresa church

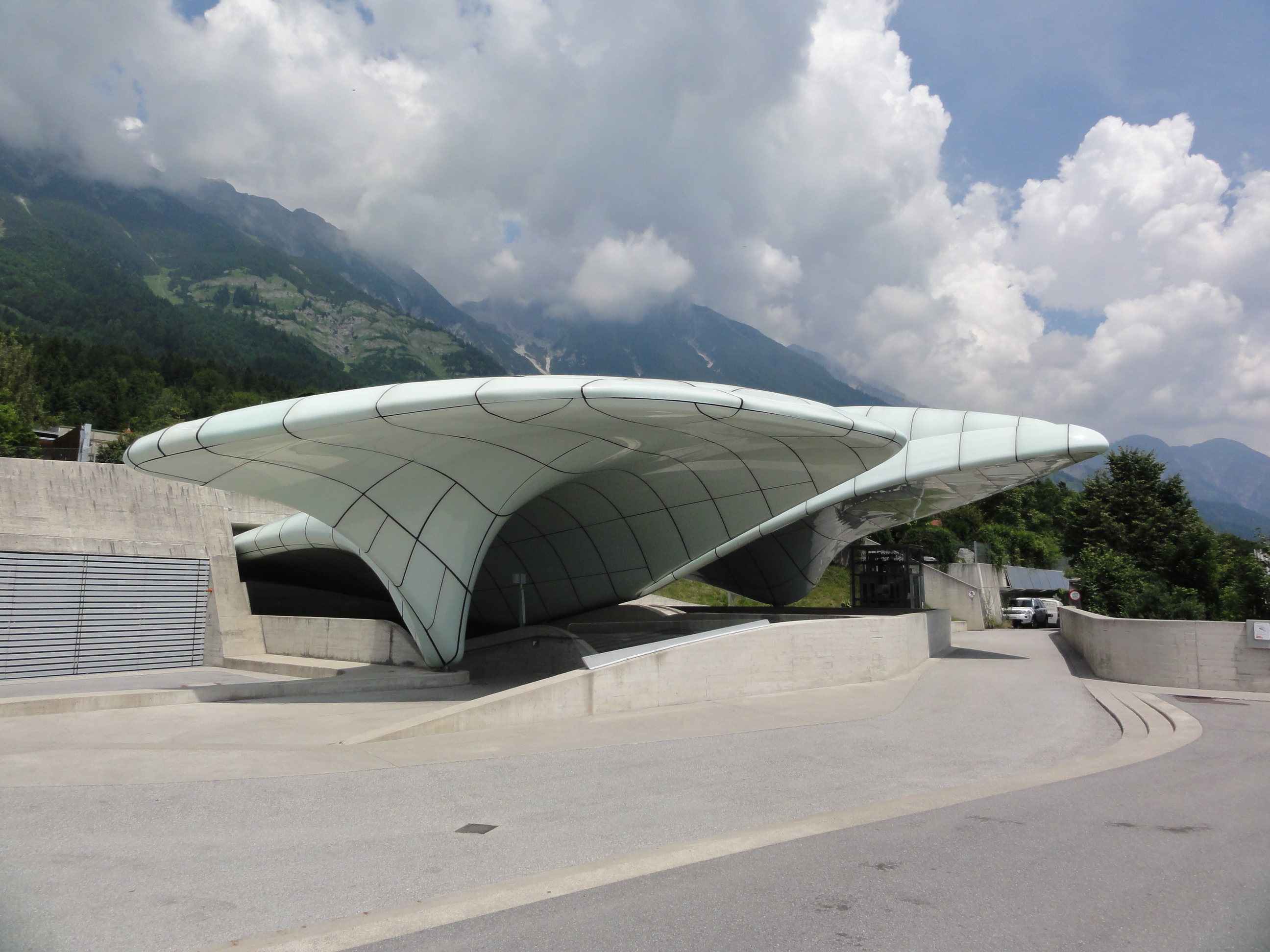
Bergstation of Hungerburgbahn in Hungerburg.

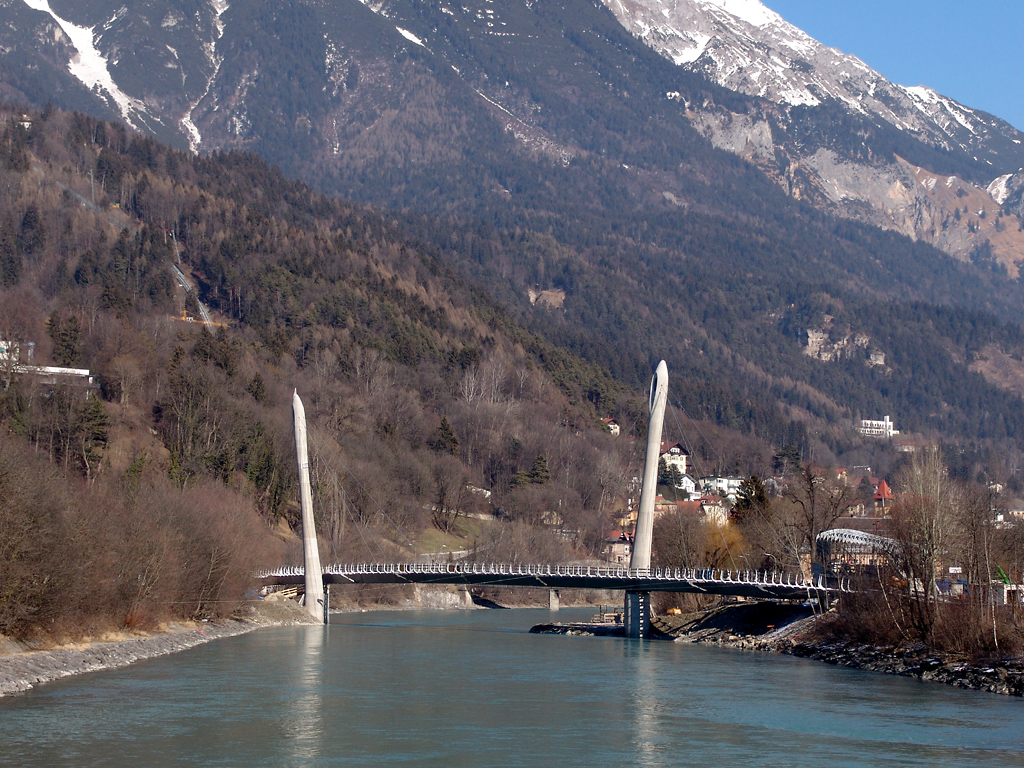
Hungerburgbahn crossing the Inn River in Hungerburg.
