= Nordkette Cable Car =

Cableway in Tyrol, Austria

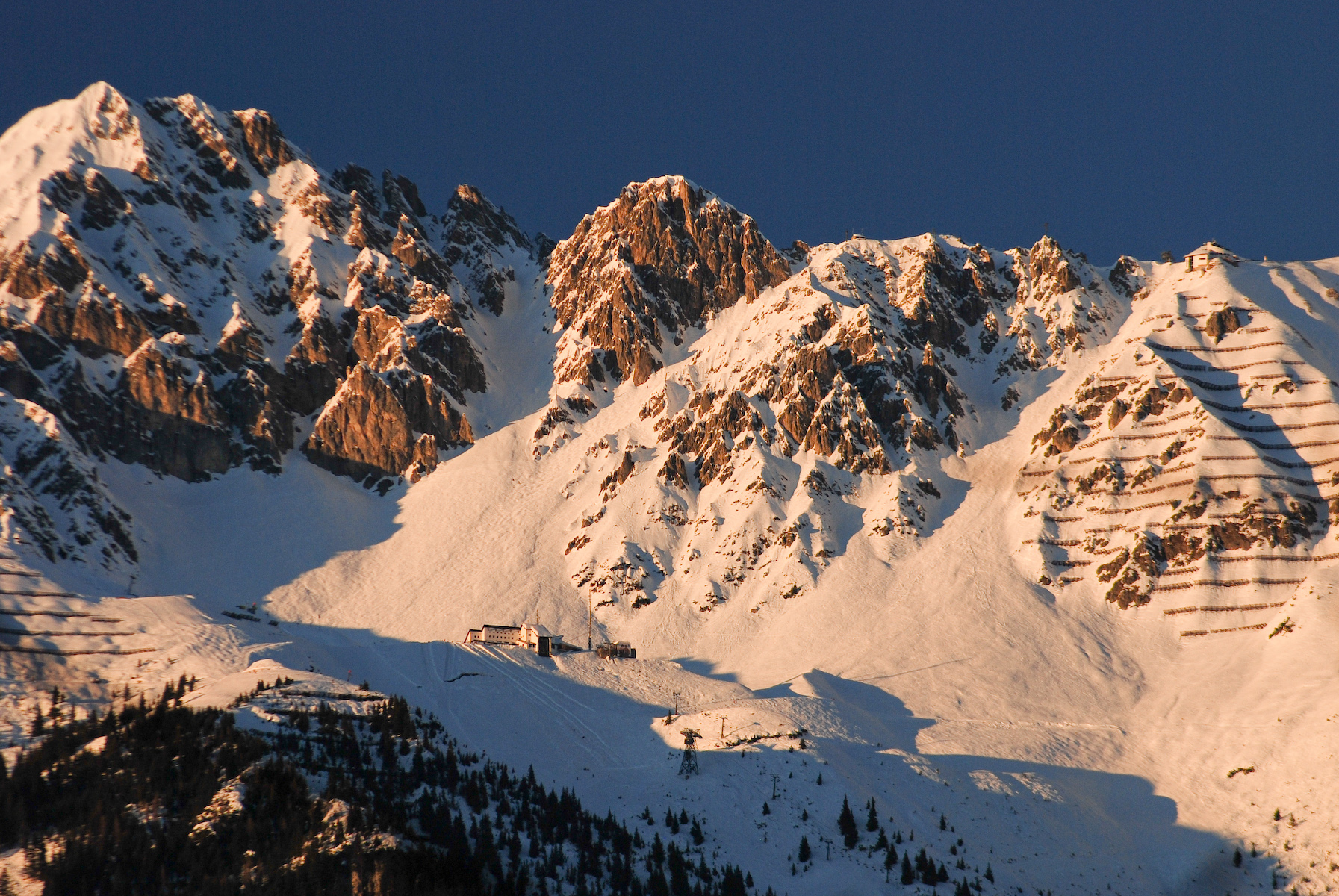
Seegrube and Hafelekar

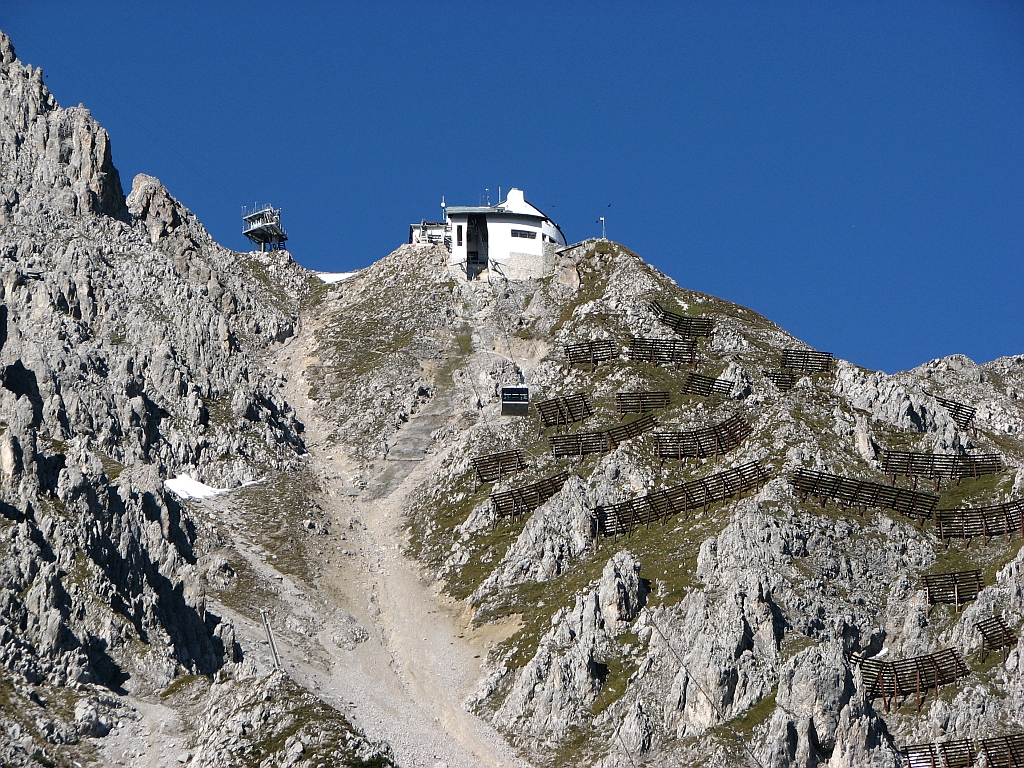
The gondola of the second leg from Seegrube to Hafelekar entering Hafelekar Station.

The Nordkette Cable Car (German: Nordkettenbahn) in the Austrian state of Tyrol is a gondola lift from Innsbruck to the Nordkette, the southernmost mountain chain of the Karwendel.

It runs in two sections from the Innsbruck quarter of Hungerburg via Seegrube Station (1,905 m (AA)) to the top station, Hafelekar (2,269 m above sea level (AA)). The cableway is the heart of the Innsbrucker Nordkettenbahnen ski area.

== Literature ==
- Die Seilbahnstationen der Nordkettenbahn bei Innsbruck von Architekt F(ranz) Baumann. In: Die Bau- und Werkkunst. Monatsschrift für alle Gebiete der Architektur und angewandten Kunst, Haus und Heim, Year 1928, (V. Jahrgang), p. 101–114. (Online bei ANNO).
- Roland Kubanda (Hrsg.): Stadtflucht 10 m/s. Innsbruck und die Nordkettenbahn. Beiträge zum 75-Jahr-Jubiläum. Studien Verlag, Innsbruck 2003, Veröffentlichungen des Innsbrucker Stadtarchivs, 352 S., Gebunden, ISBN 978-3-7065-1890-1.
