= The Amazing Race (American TV series) =

American adventure reality game show

- Genre: Reality competition
- Created by: Elise Doganieri; Bertram van Munster
- Presented by: Phil Keoghan
- Starring: The Amazing Race contestants
- Theme music composer: John M. Keane
- Composers: Lee Sanders; Christopher Franke; Vaughn Johnson; Devin Powers; Thomas Morse; John M. Keane; Nate Fenwick Smith; Stu Goldberg; Jason Greenberg; Eric Hester
- Country of origin: United States
- Original language: English
- No. of seasons: 39
- No. of episodes: 451 (list of episodes)

Production
- Executive producers: Jerry Bruckheimer; Phil Keoghan; Bertram van Munster; Jonathan Littman; Elise Doganieri; Mark Vertullo
- Production location: See below
- Camera setup: Multi-camera
- Running time: 43–86 minutes
- Production companies: Jerry Bruckheimer Television; Earthview, inc. (2001); Worldrace Productions (2002–present); Amazing Race Productions (2002–present); CBS Studios (Note: Known as CBS Productions from 2001 to 2006, CBS Paramount Television from 2006 to 2009, and CBS Television Studios from 2009 to 2020; Uncredited from 2002 onwards.); 20th Television (Note: Known as Touchstone Television from 2001 to 2007, ABC Studios from 2007 to 2020, and ABC Signature from 2020 to 2024; Credited in copyright only from 2004 onwards.)

Original release
- Network: CBS
- Release: September 5, 2001 – present

Related
- International versions

The Amazing Race is an American reality competition show in which teams of two race around the world (except the Family Edition which featured 10 teams of four and was contested entirely within North and Central America). Each season is split into legs, with each leg requiring teams to deduce clues, navigate themselves in foreign areas, interact with locals, perform physical and mental challenges, and travel by airplane, boat, taxi, and other public transportation options on a limited budget provided by the show. Teams are progressively eliminated at the end of most legs, while the first team to arrive at the end of the final leg wins the grand prize of US$1 million. As the original version of the Amazing Race franchise, the CBS program has been running since September 5, 2001. Numerous international versions have been developed following the same core structure, while the American version is also broadcast to several other countries.

The show was created by Elise Doganieri and Bertram van Munster, who, along with Jonathan Littman, serve as executive producers. The show is produced by Earthview Inc. (headed by Doganieri and van Munster), Jerry Bruckheimer Television for CBS Studios and 20th Television (divisions of Skydance and The Walt Disney Company, respectively). The series has been hosted by veteran New Zealand television personality Phil Keoghan since its premiere.

Since the inception of the Primetime Emmy Award for Outstanding Reality-Competition Program in 2003, The Amazing Race has won ten out of nineteen times; the show has also won other awards and commendations. Although it has moved around several prime time slots, the program has averaged about 10 million viewers per season.

== The Race ==
The Amazing Race is a reality television competition, typically involving eleven teams of two, in a race around the world. The race cycle is divided into a number of legs, normally twelve; each episode generally covers the events of one leg. Each leg ends with a Pit Stop, where teams are given a chance to rest and recover before starting the next leg twelve hours later. The first team to arrive at a Pit Stop is often awarded a prize such as a trip, while the last team is normally eliminated from the race. Some legs are non-elimination legs, where the last team to arrive may be penalized in the following leg. Some races have featured double-length legs, where the teams meet the host at what appears to be a Pit Stop, only to be told to continue to race. The final leg of each race is run by the last three remaining teams, and the first to arrive at the final destination wins the show's prize, US$1 million. The average length of each race is approximately 21 to 30 days.

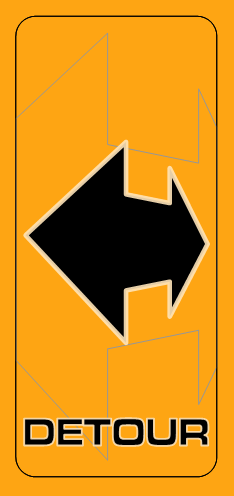
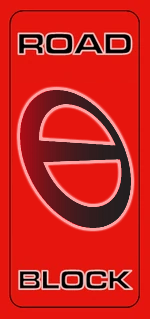
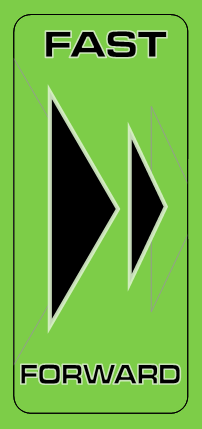
Teams follow clues given to them in marked envelopes, including (from left to right) Route Info, Detour, Roadblock and Fast Forward.

During each leg, teams follow clues from Route Markers boxes containing clue envelopes marked in the race's red, yellow, and white colors to determine their next destination. Travel between destinations includes commercial and chartered airplanes, boats, trains, taxis, buses, and rented vehicles provided by the show, or the teams may simply travel by foot. Teams are required to pay for all expenses while traveling from a small stipend (on the order of $100) given to them at the start of each leg. Any money left unspent can be used in future legs of the race. The only exception is air travel, where teams are given a credit card to purchase economy-class fares. Some teams have resorted to begging to replenish their funds.

Clues may directly identify locations, contain cryptic riddles such as "Travel to the westernmost point in continental Europe" that teams must figure out, or include physical elements, such as a country's flag, indicating their next destination. Clues may also describe a number of tasks that teams must complete before continuing to race. As such, teams are generally free and sometimes required to engage locals to help in any manner to decipher clues and complete tasks. Tasks are typically designed to highlight the local culture of the country they are in.

Teams are penalized for failing to complete these tasks as instructed or other rules of the race, generally thirty minutes plus any time gained for the infraction where they sit out (reference to timeout). Such penalties may be enforced while teams are racing when they arrive at the Pit Stop, or at the start of the next leg.

The events of the race are generally edited and shown in chronological order, cutting between the actions of each team as they progress. More recent seasons have been edited to show split-screen footage of simultaneous actions or two or more different teams in the style of 24. Footage from the race is interspersed with commentary from the individual teams or members recorded after each leg to give more insight on the events being shown. The show helps track racers' progress through a leg by providing frequent on-screen information identifying teams and their placement.

== Series overview ==
Season	Episodes	Originally released		Winners	Teams	Legs
Season	Episodes	First released	Last released	Winners	Teams	Legs
1	13	September 5, 2001	December 13, 2001	Rob Frisbee & Brennan Swain	11	13
2	11	March 11, 2002	May 15, 2002	Chris Luca & Alex Boylan	11	13
3	11	October 2, 2002	December 18, 2002	Flo Pesenti & Zach Behr	12	13
4	13	May 29, 2003	August 21, 2003	Reichen Lehmkuhl & Chip Arndt	12	13
5	12	July 6, 2004	September 21, 2004	Chip & Kim McAllister	11	13
6	13	November 16, 2004	February 8, 2005	Freddy Holliday & Kendra Bentley	11	12
7	12	March 1, 2005	May 10, 2005	Uchenna & Joyce Agu	11	12
8	12	September 27, 2005	December 13, 2005	Nick, Alex, Megan, & Tommy Linz	10	11
9	12	February 28, 2006	May 17, 2006	B. J. Averell & Tyler MacNiven	11	12
10	13	September 17, 2006	December 10, 2006	Tyler Denk & James Branaman	12	12
11	12	February 18, 2007	May 6, 2007	Eric Sanchez & Danielle Turner	11	13
12	11	November 4, 2007	January 20, 2008	TK Erwin & Rachel Rosales	11	11
13	11	September 28, 2008	December 7, 2008	Nick & Starr Spangler	11	11
14	12	February 15, 2009	May 10, 2009	Tammy & Victor Jih	11	11
15	11	September 27, 2009	December 6, 2009	Meghan Rickey & Cheyne Whitney	12	12
16	12	February 14, 2010	May 9, 2010	Dan & Jordan Pious	11	12
17	12	September 26, 2010	December 12, 2010	Nat Strand & Kat Chang	11	12
18	11	February 20, 2011	May 8, 2011	Kisha & Jen Hoffman	11	12
19	12	September 25, 2011	December 11, 2011	Ernie Halvorsen & Cindy Chiang	11	12
20	11	February 19, 2012	May 6, 2012	Rachel & Dave Brown, Jr.	11	12
21	11	September 30, 2012	December 9, 2012	Josh Kilmer-Purcell & Brent Ridge	11	12
22	11	February 17, 2013	May 5, 2013	Bates & Anthony Battaglia	11	12
23	11	September 29, 2013	December 8, 2013	Jason Case & Amy Diaz	11	12
24	12	February 23, 2014	May 18, 2014	Dave & Connor O'Leary	11	12
25	12	September 26, 2014	December 19, 2014	Amy DeJong & Maya Warren	11	12
26	12	February 25, 2015	May 15, 2015	Laura Pierson & Tyler Adams	11	12
27	12	September 25, 2015	December 18, 2015	Kelsey Gerckens & Joey Buttitta	11	12
28	12	February 12, 2016	May 13, 2016	Dana Borriello & Matt Steffanina	11	12
29	12	March 30, 2017	June 1, 2017	Brooke Camhi & Scott Flanary	11	12
30	8	January 3, 2018	February 21, 2018	Cody Nickson & Jessica Graf	11	12
31	11	April 17, 2019	June 26, 2019	Colin Guinn & Christie Woods	11	12
32	12	October 14, 2020	December 16, 2020	Will Jardell & James Wallington	11	11
33	11	January 5, 2022	March 2, 2022	Kim & Penn Holderness	11	11
34	12	September 21, 2022	December 7, 2022	Derek Xiao & Claire Rehfuss	12	10
35	12	September 27, 2023	December 13, 2023	Greg & John Franklin	13	12
36	10	March 13, 2024	May 15, 2024	Ricky Rotandi & Cesar Aldrete	13	11
37	12	March 5, 2025	May 15, 2025	Carson McCalley & Jack Dodge	14	12
38	12	September 25, 2025	December 10, 2025	Jas & Jag Bains	13	12
39	TBA	September 30, 2026	TBA	TBA	13	12

== Production ==
=== Concept ===
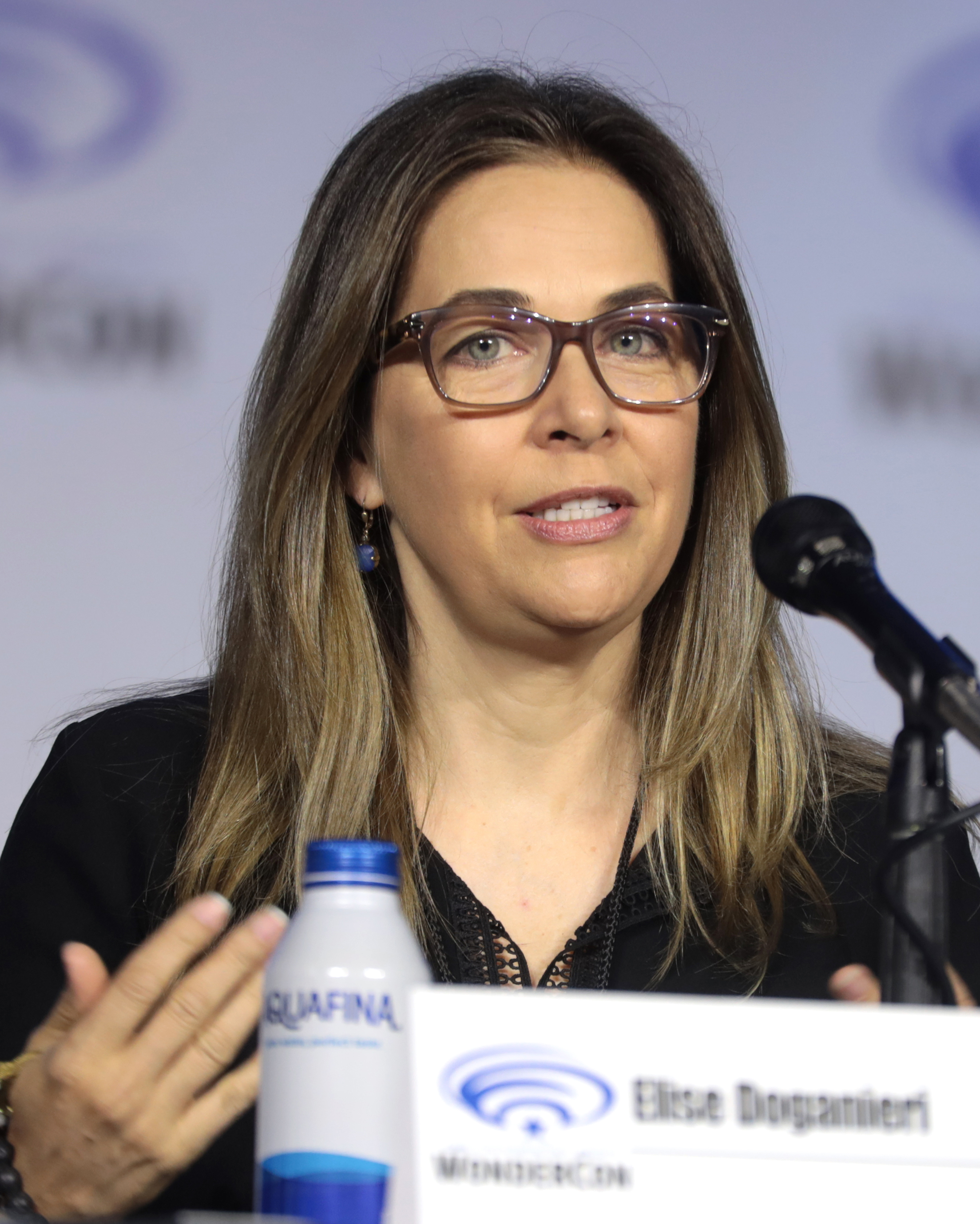
Co-creator Elise Doganieri

The original idea for The Amazing Race came from Elise Doganieri and Bertram van Munster. The two had previously met when Van Munster was producing programs such as Cops, and they continued to work together and eventually married. Around 2000, Van Munster was wrapping up production of his nature documentary series Wild Things, and he was looking for another concept. Doganieri, an advertising executive at that point, had come back from that year's MIPCOM, and she complained about the lack of good ideas from people working in television. Van Munster jokingly bet her on the spot to come up with an idea herself. Though her by-then husband was only joking, Dogenieri declared him "on," and she recalled her previous experience backpacking across Europe and meeting and interacting with the various local residents, on which basis she offered the idea of several teams of players racing across the world, interspersed with local challenges that would test the team's resolve and relationships, and which teams would be eliminated along the way but not due to someone else doing something against that team. Van Munster was intrigued with the idea, and had already had experience with "reality" television with Cops, considered to be the predecessor of reality television during the 1990s. The two approached Jerry Bruckheimer and Jonathan Littman with the idea, and the four refined it into the concept of The Amazing Race. Van Munster pitched the idea to Les Moonves of CBS shortly thereafter, who greenlit the show by June 2000. Initial scouting for locations for the first season started in August 2000. At least one casting call in New York City, at that point calling the show the "CBS Summer Global Adventure Series", took place in December 2000. Filming took place between March and April 2001.

=== Planning ===
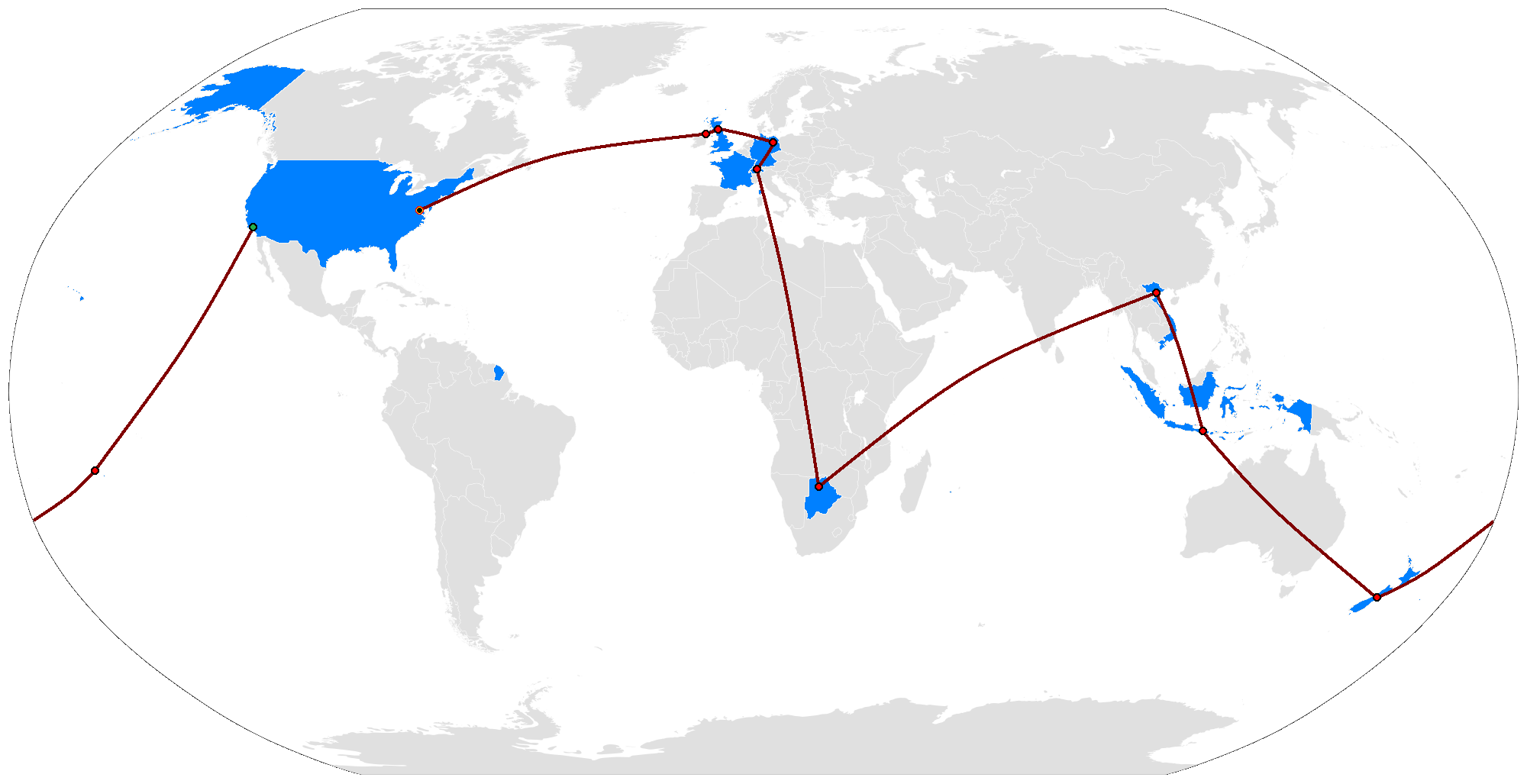
Most seasons, including The Amazing Race 22 (shown above), almost fully circumnavigate the globe, starting and ending in the United States and visiting three to six continents.

Prior to each of the Races, the production team plans out the locations and tasks that the racers will travel, working in conjunction with local representatives, each of whom Van Munster had initially had available for a different show. The staff also consults with ex-military or federal agents that are aware of political matters in foreign areas, who may advise on countries or regions to avoid. Van Munster and others will then travel the proposed course to verify the locations and identify needs for filming for the show. The crew works with local government representatives to assure the safety of the racers while traveling through certain areas of the world. Despite pre-planning, the production crew may be faced with obstacles forcing them to change tasks or even locations. In one situation during planning of the second race, the Argentine bank system failed, creating political unrest, and a new country was selected. Similarly, after the Egyptian Revolution of 2011 and the sexual assault of South African-American reporter Lara Logan who worked for CBS, the production staff considers Egypt to be "off the map right now." While filming had started on the 33rd season of the race in early February 2020, CBS temporarily stopped production and ordered all teams and staff back to the United States due to the COVID-19 pandemic out of caution, though stated that the virus had not been contracted by anyone on the show. At the time, three episodes of the season had been filmed and no new production start date for the series had yet been determined. In 2023, van Munster said that they would not be traveling to Russia, Mainland China, and certain parts of West Africa for the foreseeable future. It has been estimated, by Van Munster, that over 2,000 people worldwide are involved in the production of any one season of the Race.

Tasks are generally selected to represent the local flavor of the country or region they are in. They typically look for activities that are not often considered something a tourist would do but part of the way of life in a country, as this would generally be a new experience for all the racers. Production relies on their own experiences as well to develop tasks; Van Munster noted that a task in season 21 involving synchronized swimming was based on his own struggles as a teenager to learn how to do a similar routine, thus assuring that if he could do it, racers could do it as well.

A Race's route has to be approved by CBS before production can start on their scouting. The specific tasks, clues, and other Race elements like the sequence of non-elimination legs, are all set about a month before filming. The production can allow for some flexibility to minimize the difficulties of production. In the first season, one Pit Stop was located and extended to 72 hours instead of the normal 12 due to a sandstorm. Also in that season, two of the four final teams ended up about 24 hours behind the lead teams due to flight and hours-of-operation limitations, creating a production nightmare. In later seasons, production has improvised extended Pit Stops by a day or so to prevent teams from becoming too spread out. In the tenth season, Phil Keoghan, host of the Races, was detained by officials in Ukraine, where the ninth leg took place, and the local American ambassador, who happened to be a fan of the show, helped to free him. The 33rd season had started filming at the onset of the COVID-19 pandemic, and production was forced to stop the race after 3 legs; after a year of additional planning and rerouting, the remaining legs were filmed but with a course through countries with low COVID-19 rates and using a charter jet for transport between countries to minimize the impact of COVID-19 on the cast and crew.

The producers review previous seasons and make changes to new seasons as to keep the show fresh and unexpected; Littman stated that with as many seasons now filmed as have been of the Race, many racers come to know what to expect and as producers, they need a way to shake things up, as "whenever you throw a wrench into [the Race], it completely throws them off." For example, while teams at Pit Stops during the first several seasons were allowed to mingle, the producers have since purposely kept teams apart during this time, as it serves to both keep teams unaware of the finishing order and the fate of an eliminated team, and prevents alliances from forming to keep the teams competitive. They also looked to change the format of the team structure, but found that their first such experiment with the season 8 "Family Edition" was poorly received by American audiences though had a strong reception from overseas broadcasts of that series.

==== Product placement ====
Though The Amazing Race involves significant amounts of travel across the world for around a hundred people, Doganieri has published her own estimates that their production costs are in line with, if not less than, those of other reality television shows, which estimates she bases in part on the fact that most of the production staff have been with the show for a long period and work efficiently to help move the competition. The cost of the show has been subsidized by its sponsors, who provide trips and other prizes to teams that arrive first on certain legs, or have their products featured as a task. For example, the seventh through thirty-third seasons were sponsored by Travelocity, and typically one leg per season will involve a task that includes the Travelocity "Roaming Gnome;" trip prizes for first-place finishes on many legs are funded by Travelocity and the local hotel at the trip destination. Ford Motor Company was also a major sponsor during nine seasons of the show, and typically teams will be given Ford vehicles to drive for various legs and as prizes for finishing first on a leg. In another example, a tea-themed leg in the 18th season was sponsored by Snapple Beverages, which had developed a new limited edition flavor specifically for the show. Since the thirty-fourth season, Expedia has served as the primary sponsor of the show providing trip prizes for first-place finishes and with one leg per season featuring a local tourism-inspired task called an "Expedia Experience". The Amazing Race has been considered to be a show that incorporates a large number of product placements as tracked by ACNeilsen, often being one of the top shows for product placement each year.

=== Casting ===
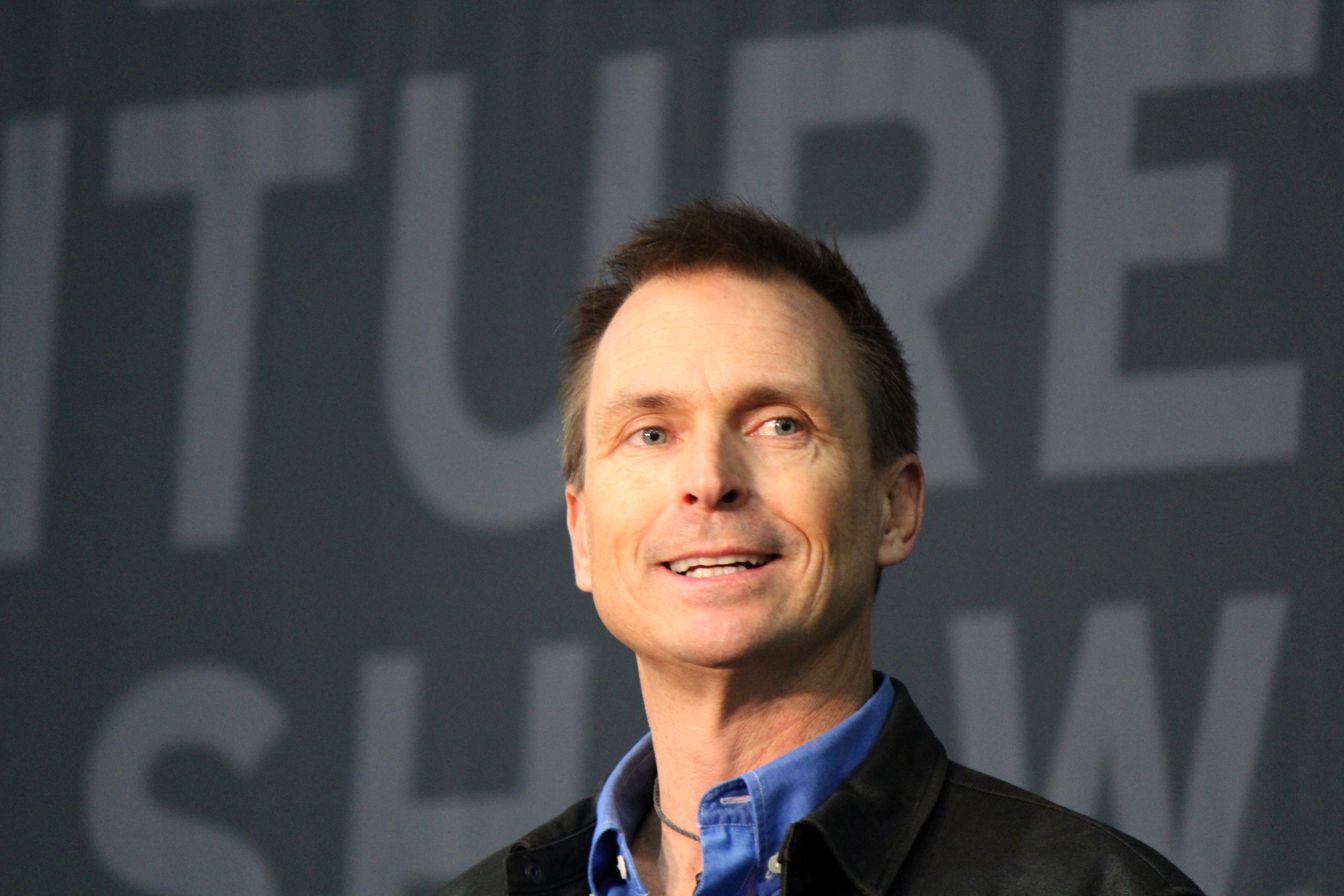
Phil Keoghan, the host of The Amazing Race

The Amazing Race has been hosted by New Zealander Phil Keoghan since its 2001 debut. Keoghan initiates the start of the race, introduces each new area and describes each task for the viewers, and meets each team at the Pit Stops along with a local greeter informing the teams of their placement or their elimination followed by a short interview, as well as announcing the winners at the finish line. Keoghan was a television host in New Zealand prior to The Amazing Race, and had traveled the world and performed adventurous feats for these shows. His background led him to apply for the hosting duties of Survivor. Though Keoghan was on the shortlist, the producers of Survivor chose Jeff Probst, while Keoghan was found to be a better fit for The Amazing Race. Keoghan's performance as a host has been highlighted by his ability to arch his eyebrows to the arriving teams to increase suspense before revealing their position, which Keoghan says he copied as a kid from Lee Majors' role in The Six Million Dollar Man. Racers and fans of the show often refer to the progressive elimination of teams as "Philimination". Keoghan signed an extended contract with CBS to continue hosting The Amazing Race for "several years", according to TV Guide, shortly after the conclusion of The Amazing Race 18. The contract will also allow Keoghan to develop ideas into shows for the network.

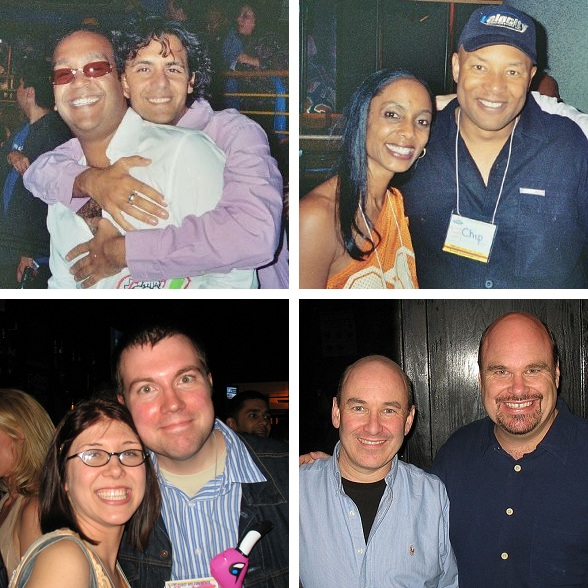
Four teams from four different seasons. Clockwise from top left: best friends Danny & Oswald of Season 2, married parents Kim & Chip of Season 5, brothers Gerard & Ken of Season 3, and dating couple Lori & David of Season 9.

Prior to each race, CBS and World Race Productions hold casting auditions around the country and accept submissions through postal mail. More recent seasons have included recruited contestants. According to casting director Lynne Spillman, they look to cast a diverse array of teams to appeal to a wide range of audience members. Spillman notes they put more value on contestants that are "great talkers" as well as racers, and see those that have deep knowledge of the Race as a plus over other factors like looks and strength. The casting process takes about four months to complete. All teams are compensated for the time missed from their jobs, though the amount is undisclosed and confidential; one racer claimed that most people would lose money from their Amazing Race stipend compared to their typical salaries. While the producers prefer to use teams that have never been on the show before or celebrities, they are at times pressured by CBS to include known people.

Each member of the two-person teams is required to be adult American citizen with an existing relationship with their teammate; according to Keoghan, in contrast to other reality television shows that pit individuals against each other, "it's more interesting to see how an experience like [The Amazing Race] affects an existing relationship". Teams are primarily married and dating couples (regardless of sexual orientation), near and distant relatives, co-workers, and friends. Most teams that participate are average Americans, but The Amazing Race has included teams or team members with some celebrity status, along with contestants from other reality TV shows. The show's 28th season was primarily made up of social media celebrities and their partners, friends, or relatives as a means to capture a younger audience demographic. The show's 29th season featured 22 strangers who met for the first time at the starting line. Three special seasons of The Amazing Race have featured returning teams or racers, and the 31st season featured 11 teams, each representing 3 different reality shows: Big Brother, The Amazing Race, and Survivor.

Racers have found fame in part due to their appearance on The Amazing Race. Chip Arndt, who had raced with his civil partner Reichen Lehmkuhl, has become an activist for the lesbian and gay community. Blake Mycoskie, based on his experiences traveling to Argentina after the show, later founded TOMS Shoes with the concept to donate one pair of shoes to poor children in countries like Argentina for each one sold. Dating goth couple Kent "Kynt" Kaliber and Vyxsin Fiala became models for the Hot Topic chain of punk/rock culture clothing stores after their appearance on the show. Jet and Cord McCoy used their celebrity status from their appearances to run for separate positions in the 56th Oklahoma Legislature.

=== Filming ===
Through the 17th season of the Race, the show used standard-definition television cameras despite the move of most other primetime shows, including reality television shows like Survivor, to high-definition television (HD) cameras prior to 2010. Worldrace Productions cited the cost and fragility of HD equipment as a barrier to its use for the Race. While other scripted or reality shows that film in one location have the ability to replace equipment quickly from a nearby facility, the mobile nature of the Race made the prospect of using HD difficult. The 18th season of the Race, filmed in late 2010, was the first to be filmed in HD. The production team uses Sony XDCAMs, allowing the filming to be transferred directly to digital format and couriered to the editors.

Prior to the filming of the race, selected teams are given a list of countries – including additional countries that are not planned for the race – for which they will need to apply for visas. Teams prepare backpacks for clothing, hygiene, and other personal items; the racers are given a list of items that are forbidden from taking. Electronics like laptops, cell phones, and GPS devices are banned from the race, and racers are asked to avoid clothing with brand logos. Travelers can not bring maps ahead of time, although they can buy maps during the competition if they choose. A few days before the race, teams are sequestered at a hotel for a final review of the rules, before they are finally taken to the race starting line. Several takes of the start of the Race are recorded for production of the show and to go over any final rules clarifications with the racers, before the Race is officially started.

Once the Race starts, each team is accompanied by a two-person audio/video crew that films and records the team, alongside body mics worn by the racers. Unless otherwise indicated, the crew must be able to accompany the team through all travels; for example, teams must be able to acquire four tickets on a single flight or otherwise cannot take that flight. Four tickets are usually purchased off-camera using a credit card supplied by World Race Productions. Teams must stay within twenty feet of their crew except for restroom breaks and pit stops, and if for some reason teams are separated from their audio/video crew, such as due to limited space in ground transportation options, they must wait for the crew to catch up to them before continuing. The crews rotate between teams at Pit Stops to avoid any possible favoritism that may develop between a team and its crew, and to avoid giving the appearance of collusion. At Pit Stops, a team of captains accurately record arrival times, amounts of money teams have remaining, and other factors to make sure that racers have properly completed each leg, assuring that the Race is run in a fair manner. The production team will remind players about critical local rules and laws they must follow to avoid any legal conflicts, but otherwise try to avoid giving too many instructions to players; Littman stated they chose not to interfere too much as "that's when you get the best material. They're wild cards." van Munster stated: "...when Phil yells 'Go,' it's 'Action' until three weeks later when we say 'Cut.'"

The production crew, including Keoghan, Doganieri, and van Munster, all typically travel to the next destination of the race ahead of the teams. In planning the race, the production team develops what Doganieri calls a Fast/Slow document, outlining what they believe is the fastest and slowest times that a team may take to complete all tasks on a leg based on test runs, from which they use to plan their travel ahead of the teams. According to Doganieri, this Fast/Slow document has been about 98% accurate through all seasons through 2014. Productions work with local agents, representatives, and film crews to prepare for the tasks before the racers arrive, and are in coordination with the audio/video crews to track racers during a leg. For example, to prevent clue boxes from being interfered with by locals, they are covered with garbage bags and monitored by production staff, and only when teams are about five minutes out are the bags removed. At times, the production team has been only minutes ahead of teams before they check into the Pit Stop, forcing production to restage the teams' arrival there once they are ready. Since the 25th season, Keoghan has been featured filming explanations for tasks as racers ran about behind him.

Most eliminated teams are sent to a resort destination informally dubbed "Sequesterville", where they will wait until the end of the race to be flown into the final destination city so they can be present at the Finish Line. In later seasons, short web videos hosted by CBS titled "Elimination Station" show the events at this location as new teams arrive and the events that occur during the teams' stay. Other teams, generally the last few eliminated before the final three, are used as "decoy teams", and run the race's final leg ahead of the actual final teams, in hopes of confusing possible spoilers about the race's outcome from locals. Keoghan has also recorded his own videos during the show's filming, used to show what happens behind the scenes to viewers.

== Countries and locales visited ==
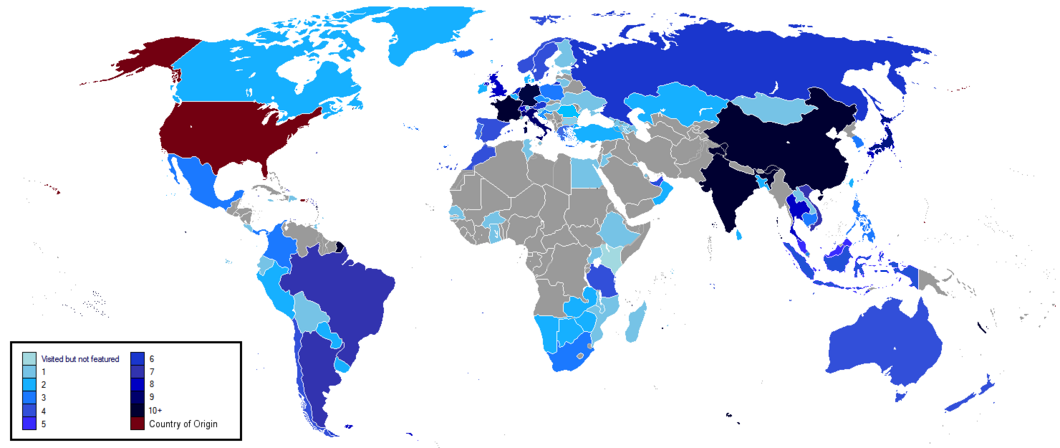
Countries that The Amazing Race visited are shown in color.

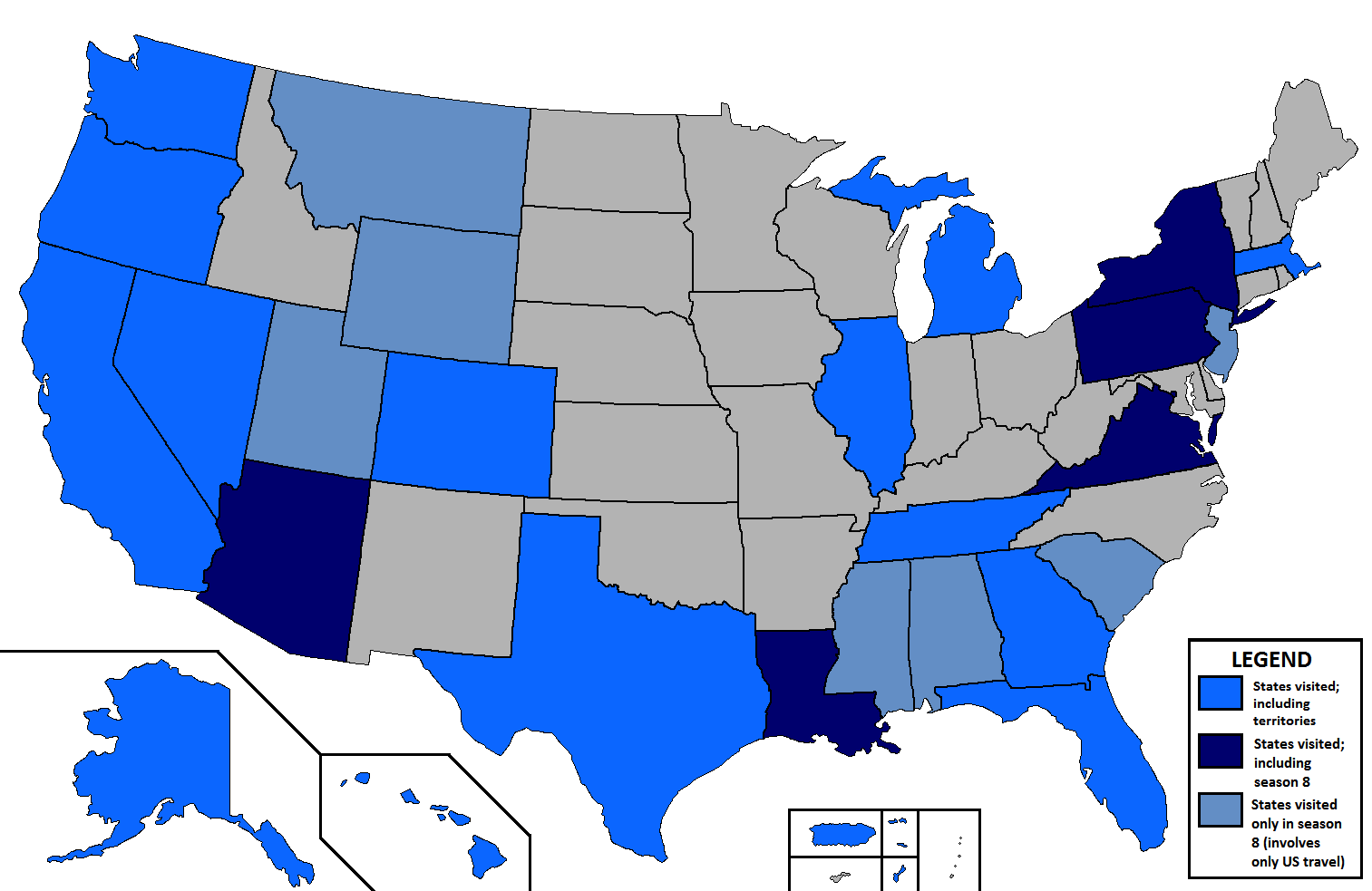
U.S. states and territories that The Amazing Race visited are shown in color.

Most routes in The Amazing Race circumnavigate the globe, starting from one American city (since season 12, the starting line has typically been located in or near Los Angeles (Note: Exceptions are typically seasons that visit California during the Finale)) and ending in another American city. There are several exceptions:

- In three seasons, The Amazing Race began and ended in the same city: season one (New York City), season six (Chicago), and season nine (Denver); only in season nine was the Starting Line and Finish Line in the same place: Red Rocks Amphitheater.
- Season seven crossed through Argentina, South Africa, and India before returning westward to the U.S. via Europe and the Caribbean.
- Season eight (also known as Family Edition) stayed entirely within North and Central America.
- Season twenty-eight and season thirty-three began in the contestants' homes – scattered across the United States – via video message from Phil Keoghan. Teams in season twenty-eight were instructed to travel Mexico City for the first leg, while teams in season thirty-three were instructed to travel to London for the first leg.
- Three seasons produced between 2020 and 2022 were all impacted by special protocols regarding travel due to the COVID-19 pandemic. As such, they did not circumnavigate the globe:
  - Season thirty-three was held entirely in Europe, with two separate filming periods. The first three legs were held in London and Glasgow, both in the United Kingdom, filmed in February 2020 as normal before the race was suspended due to the emergence of COVID-19. Following a 19-month suspension, the race was restarted, with another seven legs filmed in September 2021 across Europe. The contestants and production crew traveled on a charter plane between these legs.
  - Season thirty-four began in Munich, Germany, and traveled within Continental Europe, Jordan and Iceland before concluding in Nashville. The season also used charter plane travel between legs.
  - Season thirty-six (which was filmed before season thirty-five) began in Puerto Vallarta, Mexico, and traveled across South America and the Caribbean before concluding in Philadelphia. The season also used charter plane travel between legs.
- Season thirty-eight (European Adventure) began in Hoorn, Netherlands and, similar to season thirty-three, was held entirely in Europe in one single filming period before returning to the United States and finishing in New York City.
- Season thirty-nine began in Vancouver, Canada.

=== Countries and territories visited ===
As of season 39, The Amazing Race has visited 98 countries, one overseas country, and three territories. (Note: This count only includes international countries or U.S. states that fielded actual route markers, challenges or finish mats. Airport stopovers and mandatory layovers are not counted or listed.) The most visited country in the original American series is France, with 22 Pit Stops among 16 seasons, followed by China, with 22 Pit Stops among 15 seasons.

==== North America ====
Rank	Country/Territory	Seasons visited	Pit Stops
1	United States (Note: Including the unincorporated organized territories and the Commonwealth of: Puerto Rico (7); Guam (11), which is located in Oceania; United States Virgin Islands (25))	All	50 (Note: Includes 38 Finish Lines.) (Note: See United States section for details regarding visits to each state.)
2	Canada	3 (5, 8, 39)	1
2	Mexico	3 (3, 28, 36)	5
2	Panama	3 (8, 19, 29)	3
5	Barbados	1 (36)	1
5	Costa Rica	1 (8)	1
5	Dominican Republic	1 (36)	2
5	Jamaica	1 (7)	1
5	Puerto Rico	1 (7)	0
5	Trinidad and Tobago	1 (32)	1
5	United States Virgin Islands	1 (25)	1

==== South America ====
Rank	Country	Seasons visited	Pit Stops
1	Argentina	7 (5, 7, 11, 16, 20, 27, 36)	11
1	Brazil	7 (2, 9, 13, 18, 27, 29, 32)	10
3	Chile	5 (7, 11, 16, 23, 36)	8
4	Colombia	3 (28, 32, 36)	5
5	Paraguay	2 (20, 32)	2
5	Peru	2 (7, 26)	3
5	Uruguay	2 (5, 36)	2
8	Bolivia	1 (13)	1
8	Ecuador	1 (11)	1

==== Europe ====
Rank	Country	Seasons visited	Pit Stops
1	France (Note: In addition to metropolitan France, this list includes overseas country of French Polynesia (22), which is in Oceania.)	16 (1, 4, 6, 10, 16, 21, 22, 26, 27, 28, 30, 32, 33, 34, 37, 38)	22
2	Germany	12 (3, 6, 9, 14, 16, 19, 20, 22, 26, 32, 34, 35)	10
3	Italy	11 (1, 4, 9, 12, 20, 24, 25, 29, 34, 37, 38)	15
4	Netherlands	8 (4, 12, 15, 21, 26, 27, 31, 38)	8
4	Switzerland	8 (3, 14, 18, 22, 24, 28, 31, 33)	11
4	United Kingdom (Note: As of season 33, the show has visited all four of the constituent countries of the United Kingdom: England (all 8 above listed seasons); Scotland (3, 22, 25, 33); Northern Ireland (22); Wales (24))	8 (3, 7, 17, 22, 24, 25, 31, 33)	12
7	Austria	6 (3, 4, 14, 18, 23, 34)	5
7	Russia (Note: Russia is officially counted as in Europe, as revealed in Season 13 when Phil summarized that season had visited 5 continents, with Russia being the only European country. This list includes the region of Siberia (14), which is part of the Asian continent.)	6 (5, 9, 13, 14, 17, 21)	10
7	Spain	6 (3, 10, 21, 24, 34, 39)	5
10	Sweden	5 (6, 15, 17, 25, 35)	4
11	Greece	4 (9, 29, 33, 38)	5
11	Norway	4 (6, 17, 23, 29)	4
11	Portugal	4 (3, 23, 33, 37)	4
14	Croatia	3 (12, 31, 38)	4
14	Czech Republic	3 (15, 30, 38)	5
14	Iceland	3 (6, 30, 34)	3
14	Poland	3 (11, 23, 27)	4
18	Belgium	2 (19, 30)	3
18	Denmark	2 (19, 25)	2
18	Hungary	2 (6, 38)	2
18	Ireland	2 (12, 35)	2
18	Romania	1 (14, 38)	3
18	Turkey (Note: Turkey is officially counted as in Europe, the list includes traveled east of the Bosphorus Strait (all 2 seasons), which is part of the Asian continent.)	2 (7, 21)	2
24	Albania	1 (39)	2
24	Bulgaria	1 (37)	2
24	Estonia	1 (15)	1
24	Finland	1 (10)	0
24	Lithuania	1 (12)	1
24	Liechtenstein	1 (18)	0
24	Malta	1 (25)	1
24	Monaco	1 (26)	0
24	Slovenia	1 (35)	2
24	Ukraine	1 (10)	1

==== Africa ====
Rank	Country	Seasons visited	Pit Stops
1	Morocco	5 (3, 10, 25, 30, 39)	8
2	Tanzania	4 (5, 11, 20, 29)	6
3	South Africa	3 (1, 2, 7)	2
4	Botswana	2 (7, 22)	4
4	Namibia	2 (2, 26)	3
4	Zambia	2 (1, 27)	1
4	Zimbabwe	2 (27, 30)	4
8	Burkina Faso	1 (12)	2
8	Egypt	1 (5)	2
8	Ethiopia	1 (6)	1
8	Ghana	1 (17)	2
8	Kenya	1 (5)	0
8	Madagascar	1 (10)	1
8	Malawi	1 (19)	2
8	Mauritius	1 (10)	1
8	Mozambique	1 (11)	1
8	Senegal	1 (6)	1
8	Seychelles	1 (16)	1
8	Tunisia	1 (1)	2
8	Uganda	1 (31)	1

==== Asia ====
Rank	Country	Seasons visited	Pit Stops
1	China (Note: In addition to mainland China, this list includes the Special Administrative Regions of: Hong Kong (2, 11, 17, 27, 30, 37); Macau (11, 27))	15 (1, 2, 6, 10, 11, 14, 16, 17, 18, 21, 24, 27, 28, 30, 37)	22
2	India	13 (1, 4, 5, 7, 10, 12, 13, 14, 18, 20, 27, 32, 35)	20
3	Japan	9 (9, 12, 15, 18, 20, 23, 26, 31, 37)	11
4	Thailand	8 (1, 2, 9, 14, 19, 26, 30, 35)	14
5	Vietnam	7 (3, 10, 15, 22, 29, 31, 35)	13
6	Indonesia	6 (19, 21, 22, 23, 28, 37)	11
6	United Arab Emirates	6 (5, 15, 23, 28, 31, 37)	8
8	Malaysia	5 (3, 4, 11, 16, 24)	6
9	Cambodia	3 (13, 15, 32)	3
9	Philippines	3 (5, 25, 32)	5
9	Singapore	3 (3, 16, 25)	3
9	Sri Lanka	3 (6, 24, 39)	4
9	South Korea	3 (4, 17, 29)	3
14	Bangladesh	2 (17, 21)	3
14	Kazakhstan	2 (13, 32)	2
14	Laos	2 (31, 39)	3
14	Oman	2 (9, 17)	2
14	Taiwan	2 (12, 19)	2
19	Armenia (Note: Armenia, Azerbaijan, and Georgia are geographically located in both Europe and Asia, but they are officially counted as in Asia.)	1 (28)	1
19	Azerbaijan	1 (20)	1
19	Bahrain	1 (30)	1
19	Georgia	1 (28)	1
19	Jordan	1 (34)	2
19	Kuwait	1 (10)	1
19	Mongolia	1 (10)	1

==== Oceania ====
Rank	Country/Territory	Seasons visited	Pit Stops
1	Australia	4 (2, 4, 9, 18)	8
1	New Zealand	4 (2, 5, 13, 22)	5
3	French Polynesia	1 (22)	2
3	Guam	1 (11)	1

=== United States counts ===
As of season 38, The Amazing Race has visited 26 states and one federal district. The following list of visits by the show to each U.S. state, overseas territories are not included. The most visited state in the original American series is California in 29 seasons, followed by Hawaii and New York. (Note: Does not include minor visits as virtual Starting Line locations.)

==== West ====
Rank	State	Seasons visited	Pit Stops
1	California	29 (2, 4, 5, 7, 11, 12, 13, 14, 15, 16, 17, 18, 19, 20, 21, 22, 23, 24, 25, 26, 27, 28, 29, 30, 31, 32, 33, 35, 37)	8 (Note: Includes 8 Finish Lines.)
2	Hawaii	7 (2, 3, 4, 6, 11, 14, 20)	3 (Note: Includes 2 Finish Lines.)
3	Alaska	5 (1, 2, 9, 12, 23)	3
4	Nevada	3 (2, 15, 24)	2
4	Washington	3 (3, 10, 35)	2
6	Arizona	2 (4, 8)	3 (Note: Includes 1 Finish Line.)
7	Colorado	1 (9)	1
7	Montana	1 (8)	1
7	Oregon	1 (13)	1
7	Utah	1 (8)	1
7	Wyoming	1 (8)	1

==== Midwest ====
Rank	State	Seasons visited	Pit Stops
1	Illinois	2 (6, 29)	2
2	Michigan	1 (31)	1

==== Northeast ====
Rank	State	Seasons visited	Pit Stops
1	New York	7 (1, 8, 10, 21, 25, 27, 30, 38)	6 (Note: Includes 6 Finish Lines.)
2	Pennsylvania	2 (8, 36)	2
2	Virginia	2 (8, 22)	2
2	Washington, D.C.	2 (8, 22)	0
3	Massachusetts	1 (17)	0
3	New Jersey	1 (8)	0

==== South ====
Rank	State	Seasons visited	Pit Stops
1	Florida	5 (3, 7, 11, 18, 37)	3 (Note: Includes 3 Finish Lines.)
2	Louisiana	2 (8, 32)	2
2	Texas	2 (5, 26)	2
6	Alabama	1 (8)	1
6	Georgia	1 (19)	1
6	Mississippi	1 (8)	0
6	South Carolina	1 (8)	0
6	Tennessee	1 (34)	1

=== Continent counts ===
The first season of The Amazing Race visited four continents in total (three if excluding the United States). Season two extended the racecourse to South America and Oceania, and season three was the first time having route markers in North America outside the United States. The Amazing Race has yet to visit Antarctica.

Rank	Continent	Seasons visited
1	North America	All (Note: Excluding the U.S. states, the total count of visits in North America is 11 overall (3, 5, 7, 8, 19, 25, 28, 29, 32, 36 & 39), including Central America, the Caribbean, and the U.S. insular area within the continent.)
2	Europe	36 (1, 3–7, 9–35, 37–39)
3	Asia	35 (1–7, 9–32, 34–35, 37, 39)
4	Africa	21 (1–3, 5–7, 10–12, 16, 17, 19, 20, 22, 25–27, 29–31, 39)
5	South America	16 (2, 5, 7, 9, 11, 13, 16, 18, 20, 23, 26–29, 32, 36)
6	Oceania (Note: Referring as the Continent of Australia and Pacific Islands. The list does not include Hawaii, which counts as North America under U.S. state, proven by Phil counting "Four continents" at Season 3's Finish Line.)	9 (2, 4, 5, 9, 11, 13, 18, 22, 39)

== Impact and reception ==
=== U.S. broadcast and ratings ===
Seasonal rankings (based on average total viewers per episode) of The Amazing Race on CBS.

Season	Timeslot (ET)	Season premiere	Premiere viewers (millions)	Season finale	Finale viewers (millions)	TV season (Note: Each American network television season starts in late September and ends in late May, which coincides with the completion of May sweeps.)	Rank	Average viewers (millions)
1	Wednesday 9:00 pm (September 5, 2001 – December 18, 2002); Thursday 9:00 pm (December 13, 2001); Monday 9:00 pm (March 11, 2002)	September 5, 2001	11.83	December 13, 2001	13.65	2001–2002	73	8.80
2	Wednesday 9:00 pm (September 5, 2001 – December 18, 2002); Thursday 9:00 pm (December 13, 2001); Monday 9:00 pm (March 11, 2002)	March 11, 2002	8.95	May 15, 2002	11.25	2001–2002	49	10.30
3	Wednesday 9:00 pm (September 5, 2001 – December 18, 2002); Thursday 9:00 pm (December 13, 2001); Monday 9:00 pm (March 11, 2002)	October 2, 2002	9.49	December 18, 2002	11.00	2002–2003	71	8.98
4	Thursday 8:00 pm	May 29, 2003	9.94	August 21, 2003	9.88	2002–2003	N/A (Note: Because this edition of The Amazing Race aired during the summer (and outside of the typical television season, which runs September to May), it was not ranked in either the television season preceding it or succeeding it.)	8.32
5	Tuesday 10:00 pm	July 6, 2004	10.30	September 21, 2004	12.85	2003–2004	N/A	10.73
6	Tuesday 9:00 pm	November 16, 2004	11.79	February 8, 2005	12.62	2004–2005	31	11.54
7	Tuesday 9:00 pm	March 1, 2005	11.76	May 10, 2005	16.01	2004–2005	25	13.05
8	Tuesday 9:00 pm	September 27, 2005	10.64	December 13, 2005	11.51	2005–2006	42	10.80
9	Tuesday 9:00 pm (February 28, 2006) (Note: The two-hour premiere was the only episode to air Tuesday at 9:00 pm.); Tuesday 10:00 pm (March 7–28, 2006) (Note: Episodes aired Tuesdays at 10:00 pm during the entire month of March 2006, and then moved to Wednesdays at 8:00 pm for the remainder of the season to make room for CSI: NY.); Wednesday 8:00 pm (April 5, 2006 – May 17, 2006)	February 28, 2006	10.40	May 17, 2006	8.99	2005–2006	56	9.10
10	Sunday 8:00 pm	September 17, 2006	10.12	December 10, 2006	12.73	2006–2007	31	11.50
11	Sunday 8:00 pm	February 18, 2007	10.29	May 6, 2007	10.31	2006–2007	44	10.10
12	Sunday 8:00 pm	November 4, 2007	13.82	January 20, 2008	9.75	2007–2008	25	11.84
13	Sunday 8:00 pm	September 28, 2008	10.03	December 7, 2008	10.57	2008–2009	27	11.14
14	Sunday 8:00 pm	February 15, 2009	9.20	May 10, 2009	12.49	2008–2009	29	10.91
15	Sunday 8:00 pm	September 27, 2009	10.40	December 6, 2009	12.32	2009–2010	28	11.14
16	Sunday 8:00 pm	February 14, 2010	9.07	May 9, 2010	10.63	2009–2010	29	10.40
17	Sunday 8:00 pm	September 26, 2010	11.54	December 12, 2010	12.12	2010–2011	22	11.93
18	Sunday 8:00 pm	February 20, 2011	9.15	May 8, 2011	8.97	2010–2011	39	10.35
19	Sunday 8:00 pm	September 25, 2011	10.18	December 11, 2011	11.72	2011–2012	34	11.13
20	Sunday 8:00 pm	February 19, 2012	10.34	May 6, 2012	9.40	2011–2012	37	10.30
21	Sunday 8:00 pm	September 30, 2012	9.40	December 9, 2012	9.35	2012–2013	29	10.68
22	Sunday 8:00 pm	February 17, 2013	9.57	May 5, 2013	9.10	2012–2013	36	10.17
23	Sunday 8:00 pm	September 29, 2013	8.62	December 8, 2013	9.21	2013–2014 (Note: Starting from 2013–14 TV season ranking, the two seasons are listed together in the final rankings together as The Amazing Race. Previously, seasons were listed separately.)	34	9.49
24	Sunday 8:00 pm	February 23, 2014	6.71	May 18, 2014	8.22	2013–2014	34	9.49
25	Friday 8:00 pm	September 26, 2014	5.48	December 19, 2014	6.59	2014–2015 (Note: Starting with the 2014–15 season, final season viewer averages are based on Live+7 ratings data.)	69	7.49
26	Wednesday 9:30 pm (February 25, 2015) (Note: The ninety-minute premiere was the only episode to air Wednesday at 9:30 pm.); Friday 8:00 pm (February 27, 2015 – May 15, 2015)	February 25, 2015	6.16	May 15, 2015	5.72	2014–2015	69	7.49
27	Friday 8:00 pm	September 25, 2015	5.79	December 11, 2015	6.16	2015–2016	58	7.56
28	Friday 8:00 pm	February 12, 2016	6.09	May 13, 2016	5.93	2015–2016	58	7.56
29	Thursday 10:00 pm (Note: Two episodes aired on April 20, 2017, and May 18, 2017, with the first airing at the earlier time of 9:00 pm and the second at the regular time.)	March 30, 2017	4.30	June 1, 2017		2016–2017	64	6.33
30	Wednesday 8:00 pm (January 3–31, 2018) (Note: Episodes aired Wednesdays at 8:00 pm during the entire month of January 2018, and then moved to Wednesdays at 9:00 pm for the remainder of the season to make way for Celebrity Big Brother, all in 2-hour episodes.); Wednesday 9:00 pm (February 7–21, 2018)	January 3, 2018	7.33	February 21, 2018	4.34	2017–2018	50	7.70
31	Wednesday 9:00 pm (April 17, 2019 – May 8, 2019 and June 26, 2019) (Note: Episodes aired Wednesdays at 9:00 pm in the first four episodes after Survivor: Edge of Extinction, and then moved to Wednesdays at 8:00 pm for the remainder of the season. The season finale aired on June 26, 2019, to its former time slot to make way for Big Brother 21.); Wednesday 8:00 pm (May 22, 2019 – June 19, 2019)	April 17, 2019	5.74	June 26, 2019	3.82	2018–2019	57	6.86
32	Wednesday 9:00 pm (October 14–21, 2020) (Note: Episodes aired on Wednesdays at 9:00 pm for the first two episodes after Big Brother: All-Stars, and then moved to Wednesdays at 8:00 pm for the remainder of the season.); Wednesday 8:00 pm (October 28, 2020 – December 16, 2020)	October 14, 2020	3.58	December 16, 2020	4.46	2020–2021	59	5.41
33	Wednesday 8:00 pm (January 5, 2022 and March 2, 2022) (Note: The two-hour premiere and two-hour finale were the episodes to air Wednesday at 8:00 pm.); Wednesday 9:00 pm (January 12, 2022 – February 23, 2022)	January 5, 2022	4.40	March 2, 2022	3.97	2021–2022	49	5.50
34	Wednesday 10:00 pm (September 21, 2022 and October 5–26, 2022) (Note: Episode two was the only episode to air on September 28, 2022, at 9:30 pm.); Wednesday 9:00 pm (November 2, 2022 – December 7, 2022) (Note: Remaining episodes moved to 9:00 pm after Survivor 43 following the move of The Real Love Boat to Paramount+.)	September 21, 2022	3.07	December 7, 2022	3.67	2022–2023	54	4.65
35	Wednesday 9:30 pm	September 27, 2023	2.70	December 13, 2023	3.31	2023–2024	47	4.55
36	Wednesday 9:30 pm	March 13, 2024	2.89	May 15, 2024	2.86	2023–2024	47	4.55
37	Wednesday 9:30 pm Thursday 9:00 pm (May 15, 2025)	March 5, 2025	2.62	May 15, 2025	2.82	2024–2025	96 (Note: Starting with the 2024–25 United States network television schedule, the Nielsen Media Research included broadcast and streaming shows for its top 100 list.)	5.60
38	Thursday 9:30 pm (September 25, 2025); Wednesday 9:30 pm	September 25, 2025	2.03	December 10, 2025		2025–2026		
39	Wednesday 9:30 pm Thursday 9:30 pm (October 1, 2026)	September 30, 2026	2.83			2026–2027		

Notes

During its first four seasons, even with extensive critical praise, the show garnered low Nielsen ratings, facing cancellation a number of times. The premiere of the show aired six days before the September 11 attacks, leaving the fate of the show in doubt. Producer van Munster stated that "Once we saw our billboards covered in dust from the 9/11 tragedy, we knew we had a problem". Low viewership of the show was also attributed to it being lost among all other reality television shows at the time and unable to garner similar numbers as Survivor. The Amazing Race premiered against a similarly themed reality show, Lost on NBC (unrelated to the ABC series of the same name), Lost featured teams of two stranded in a remote area of the world and forced to find their way back to the United States. A vice president of programming at CBS considered The Amazing Race to be "a show that was always on the bubble" of being canceled.

The show was considered to be saved due to several factors: the show was well received by critics, winning the Emmy for Outstanding Reality Competition Programming in 2003 and 2004; consistent viewership numbers, and feedback from the large number of fans representing the young target demographic, including Sarah Jessica Parker, who had called in directly to CBS President Les Moonves asking to save the show. The fifth season of the series, which aired from July to September 2004, had very high viewership numbers for that time of the year, averaging 10.7 million with a finale of nearly 13 million, doubling the viewership in the 18-to-34 demographic and won its time slot for every episode. The improved ratings are credited to the particular teams selected for that season. As a result, CBS began airing the sixth season during the "high-profile heart" of the November 2004 sweeps. The New York Times's Kate Aurthur suggests that ratings increases for the fifth, sixth, and seven season were a direct result of the show having racers that were portrayed as "villain" characters (specifically, Colin from season 5, Jonathan from season 6, and Rob and Amber from season 7) that created more tension between teams than previous seasons, and gave viewers teams to root for or against.

A temporary setback struck The Amazing Race after a Family Edition that aired in the fall of 2005 was not received warmly by viewers, which resulted in lowered viewership. The change in format, with teams of four and allowing for young children to race alongside their parents, hampered the travel ability of the show. Keoghan, though pleased they had tried something different with the show, attributed the poor response to the Family Edition due to too many people to follow and lack of exotic locations. This spilled over to Season 9 where it experienced dismaying ratings of only an average of 9.1 million viewers per episode, a drop from 13 million just 2 seasons ago in Season 7. The timeslot changing for Season 9 was also attributed to the drop in ratings.

From the tenth season to the twenty-fourth season, the show was moved to Sunday nights, as a result, The Amazing Race has seen further increases in its numbers. It is believed that part of this increase is due to "sports overruns" (football, basketball, or golf) that resulted from games played earlier on Sunday pushing the airtime for The Amazing Race back by some amount on the East Coast along with other CBS programming. In the Sunday timeslot, The Amazing Race follows 60 Minutes, Variety states that, while both shows have different target demographics, the crossover audience between the shows is very high based on the average household income of its viewers, and is part of the Race's success. In the 2010 season, another reality television show, Undercover Boss, was scheduled following The Amazing Race, the overall impact of these three shows have helped CBS to regain viewership on Sunday nights. According to Variety, the average age of Amazing Race viewers that watch the show live in 2009 was 51.9 years, while for those that time-shifted the show, the average age was 39.2 years. In a 2010 survey by Experian Simmons, The Amazing Race was found to be the second-highest show proportion of viewers that identify themselves as Republicans, following Glenn Beck. The season 16 finale, however, was the lowest-rated finale since season 4.

Although season 18 averaged over 10 million viewers and finished in top 40 most watched shows of the 2010–2011 television season, the ratings dropped and the season 18 finale was the second-lowest-rated Sunday night finale. The season 21 finale was down 31% from the season 19 finale on December 11, 2011. It tied as the show's lowest rated finale ever. Ratings also dropped during the season 24 finale, which was down 33% from the season 15 finale on May 18, 2014. As a result of decreasing ratings, starting with the twenty-fifth season, the show moved to Fridays at 8:00 p.m., where it had its lowest viewership ever in this series. Ratings for the show since the move to Friday have remained steady, with seasons premieres maintaining around 6 million viewers and only small drops over the course of a given season. With the show's age, some of its current fans were not born when the show had first aired in 2001, and the production team used a concept like season 28, aired in 2016, where the use of YouTube and other Internet celebrities was intended to help bridge the gap between long-time and new fans.

Starting around season 29, CBS has only ordered one series of the show per broadcast year, keeping the show as a mid-season replacement to fill it for any failing shows on the network's schedule, or otherwise broadcasting towards the latter part of the season. This has led the show to have various time slots depending on the situation. The 30th season of the show was moved by CBS to a Wednesday night slot and resulted in an improvement in viewership from previous seasons. van Munster and Doganieri credit this new timeslot to help boost ratings, as it is more amenable for family viewing than previous timeslots. Similarly, when season 31, which featured former contestants from Race, Survivor and Big Brother, premiered after Survivor: Edge of Extinction in the Wednesday night slot, the show saw a ratings boost.

The success of The Amazing Race has led other networks to attempt to develop reality shows in a similar vein; CBS Vice President for alternative programming Jennifer Bresnan stated that many of these shows pose themselves as "The Amazing Race mixed with 'X'" to try to vary the format. Such shows include Treasure Hunters (NBC, 2006), Expedition Impossible (ABC, 2011), Around the World in 80 Plates (Bravo, 2012) The Pack (Amazon, 2020), and Destination X (NBC, 2025). The Great Escape (TNT, 2012) brought van Munster and Doganieri to help with production, and was considered by critics as a "lite" version of The Amazing Race.

=== International broadcast and versions ===
The American version of The Amazing Race is rebroadcast in several countries around the world. Airings in both Canada and Australia are very popular. The Canadian showing on CTV is commonly one of the top ten most watched shows each week, according to BBM Canada, Australian broadcasts of the episodes on the Seven Network often fall into the top 20 programs for the week. Episodes of The Amazing Race also air in several other countries shortly after the American broadcast, including Israel, Latin America, China, Vietnam and the Philippines.

AXN Asia broadcasts The Amazing Race across southeast Asia. The popularity of the show through the service led to CBS allowing for the option of creating international versions of the show in October 2005. The Amazing Race Asia was one of the first versions created, following essentially the same format as the United States version.

Other international versions of the show have been produced in Latin America, Europe, Israel, Australia, and Canada.

=== Critical reception ===
Part of the show's success is considered to be the relatively simple formula of following several teams on a race around the world. Because of this, viewers can live "vicariously through the people on the screen", according to Andy Dehnart of the RealityBlurred.com website. The show is often considered to be "travel porn", offering locations that most people would never get to see in their lifetimes. Keoghan offers that:

"[The Amazing Race] exposes particular Americans to a world they don't see in primetime TV. Most of what they see is a war here, a person killed there, a natural disaster over here. We present a world that seems inviting, with people who are warm and helpful, not this big scary place that if you get in a plane you're going to be killed by traveling to some foreign land."

The show is also considered to be successful in that it does not rely on the typical tropes of reality television, where players are trying to avoid becoming too much of a target to be voted off by their fellow contestants; in The Amazing Race, a team's success is primarily based on their own performance. At the same time, the reality show setting can bring out unbecoming behavior, often leading to the stereotypical idea of ugly American tourists.

Latter seasons of the Race have been more critically panned. One factor is the predictability of the show, with little variety in the construction of specific legs and foregone outcomes of which team would be eliminated. The media site The A.V. Club, which had covered the Race for several seasons, opted to end its Race recaps mid-Season 21, with editor Scott Von Doviak stating that the show "has become so stale and predictable". Though Denhert was a supporter of the show in its earlier seasons, he has criticized latter seasons for becoming too predictable, as "failed to grow and evolve, it seems stale". Denhert does acknowledge that budget cuts for all CBS programming, including the Race, are likely causes for simple tasks and lackluster legs; Keoghan does state that the reduced budgets has made the timetable for filming "really brutal", but also considers that the difficulty of filming also reflects on the difficulty of the Race for the teams as well. Denhert further points to the lack of time given for the viewer to learn about the individuals on each team, and instead has added elements like the U-Turn and the Yield to create inter-team drama.

The show is known for a dedicated fan base that keeps in touch with the show's producers and contestants. While a race is being run and filmed, fans of the show watch for news or spotting of the racers and attempt to track their progress in real time, enhanced by recent social media tools, leading production to figure out ways to masquerade their presence in any city such as through the use of decoy teams. Despite this, fans readily track the Race as it is being run across the globe. In the 19th season, one contestant had lost her passport at a gas station while getting directions to Los Angeles International Airport. Though spotted by their A/V crew, they could not intervene, but instead alerted production, who prepared for an early elimination of the team at LAX. A bystander found the passport, and after he posted about it on Twitter, he was directed by a fan tracking the Race's progress to take the passport to the airport, returning it before the scheduled flight and keeping the team in the race. Subsequent seasons have had publicly attended live starts such as starting in Times Square for season 25, and frequent use of live social media updates by the racers by permission of production during season 28.

Coinciding with the broadcast finale for each season through about the 22nd season, fans from the website Television Without Pity arranged for a "TARCon" event in New York City along with the season's teams and other former racers.

=== Awards and nominations ===
The Amazing Race won the Primetime Emmy Award for Outstanding Reality Competition Program for the first seven years after the creation of the award in 2003, and ten of the twelve years since its creation, against other, more popular reality TV shows such as Survivor, Dancing with the Stars, and American Idol. Its streak was ended in 2010 when Top Chef won the Emmy for this category. Host Phil Keoghan revealed in an interview that the show's loss that year made him and the producers realize that they will have to try harder to win the Emmy again. In 2011, the show won in the category again for the eighth time. After its seventh consecutive win, some in the media, including Survivor host Jeff Probst suggested that The Amazing Race willingly drop out from the competition in future years, similar to Candice Bergen declining any further nominations after her fifth Emmy win for her role in Murphy Brown. van Munster has stated that it is "not likely" he will pull the show from future Emmy awards, considering that it reflects on his and his crew's hard work and high standards. The show has also been nominated and won several times for technical production (Creative Arts) Emmy awards, for Cinematography and Picture Editing for Non-Fiction programs, whereas it has only been nominated for Sound Mixing and Sound Editing for Non-Fiction programs. The show has been nominated in the same five categories for three years consecutively, a trend which continued with the 2007 Primetime Emmy Awards.

Summary of Emmy Awards and nominations
Year	Type	Category	Result	Record
2003	Primetime	Outstanding Reality-Competition Program	Won	1 for 1
2004	Primetime	Outstanding Reality-Competition Program	Won	2 for 2
2004	Creative Arts	Outstanding Sound Mixing for Nonfiction Programming (Single or Multi-Camera) for the episode "I Could Never Have Been Prepared for What I'm Looking at Right Now"	Nominated	0 for 1
2004	Creative Arts	Outstanding Picture Editing for Nonfiction Programming (Single or Multi-Camera) for the episode "I Could Never Have Been Prepared for What I'm Looking at Right Now"	Nominated	0 for 1
2004	Creative Arts	Outstanding Cinematography for Nonfiction Programming (Single or Multi-Camera) for the episode "I Could Never Have Been Prepared for What I'm Looking at Right Now"	Nominated	0 for 1
2005	Primetime	Outstanding Reality-Competition Program	Won	3 for 3
2005	Creative Arts	Outstanding Picture Editing for Nonfiction Programming (Single or Multi-Camera) for the episode "We're Moving Up the Food Chain"	Won	1 for 2
2005	Creative Arts	Outstanding Sound Mixing for Nonfiction Programming (Single or Multi-Camera) for the episode "We're Moving Up the Food Chain"	Nominated	0 for 2
2005	Creative Arts	Outstanding Cinematography for Nonfiction Programming (Single or Multi-Camera) for the episode "We're Moving Up the Food Chain"	Nominated	0 for 2
2005	Creative Arts	Outstanding Sound Editing for Nonfiction Programming (Single or Multi-Camera) for the episode "We're Moving Up the Food Chain"	Nominated	0 for 1
2006	Primetime	Outstanding Reality-Competition Program	Won	4 for 4
2006	Creative Arts	Outstanding Picture Editing for Nonfiction Programming (Single or Multi-Camera) for the episode "Here Comes the Bedouin!"	Won	2 for 3
2006	Creative Arts	Outstanding Cinematography for Reality Program for the episode "Here Comes the Bedouin!"	Won	1 for 3
2006	Creative Arts	Outstanding Sound Mixing for Nonfiction Programming (Single or Multi-Camera) for the episode "Here Comes the Bedouin!"	Nominated	0 for 3
2006	Creative Arts	Outstanding Sound Editing for Nonfiction Programming (Single or Multi-Camera) for the episode "Here Comes the Bedouin!"	Nominated	0 for 2
2007	Primetime	Outstanding Reality-Competition Program	Won	5 for 5
2007	Creative Arts	Outstanding Picture Editing for Nonfiction Programming (Single or Multi-Camera) for the episode "I Know Phil, Little Ol' Gorgeous Thing!"	Won	3 for 4
2007	Creative Arts	Outstanding Cinematography for Reality Program for the episode "I Know Phil, Little Ol' Gorgeous Thing!"	Won	2 for 4
2007	Creative Arts	Outstanding Sound Mixing for Nonfiction Programming (Single or Multi-Camera) for the episode "I Know Phil, Little Ol' Gorgeous Thing!"	Nominated	0 for 4
2007	Creative Arts	Outstanding Sound Editing for Nonfiction Programming (Single or Multi-Camera) for the episode "I Know Phil, Little Ol' Gorgeous Thing!"	Nominated	0 for 3
2008	Primetime	Outstanding Reality-Competition Program	Won	6 for 6
2008	Creative Arts	Outstanding Picture Editing for Nonfiction Programming (Single or Multi-Camera) for the episode "Honestly, They Have Witch Powers or Something"	Nominated	3 for 5
2008	Creative Arts	Outstanding Directing for Nonfiction Programming for the episode "Honestly, They Have Witch Powers or Something"	Nominated	0 for 1
2008	Creative Arts	Outstanding Cinematography for Reality Program for the episode "Honestly, They Have Witch Powers or Something"	Nominated	2 for 5
2008	Creative Arts	Outstanding Sound Mixing for Nonfiction Programming (Single or Multi-Camera) for the episode "Honestly, They Have Witch Powers or Something"	Nominated	0 for 5
2008	Creative Arts	Outstanding Sound Editing for Nonfiction Programming (Single or Multi-Camera) for the episode "Honestly, They Have Witch Powers or Something"	Nominated	0 for 4
2009	Primetime	Outstanding Reality-Competition Program	Won	7 for 7
2009	Primetime	Outstanding Host for a Reality or Reality-Competition Program; Phil Keoghan	Nominated	0 for 1
2009	Creative Arts	Outstanding Picture Editing for Nonfiction Programming (Single or Multi-Camera) for the episode "Don't Let a Cheese Hit Me"	Nominated	3 for 6
2009	Creative Arts	Outstanding Directing for Nonfiction Programming for the episode "Don't Let a Cheese Hit Me"	Nominated	0 for 2
2009	Creative Arts	Outstanding Cinematography for Reality Program for the episode "Don't Let a Cheese Hit Me"	Nominated	2 for 6
2009	Creative Arts	Outstanding Sound Mixing for Nonfiction Programming (Single or Multi-Camera) for the episode "Don't Let a Cheese Hit Me"	Nominated	0 for 6
2009	Creative Arts	Outstanding Sound Editing for Nonfiction Programming (Single or Multi-Camera) for the episode "Don't Let a Cheese Hit Me"	Nominated	0 for 5
2010	Primetime	Outstanding Reality-Competition Program	Nominated	7 for 8
2010	Primetime	Outstanding Host for a Reality or Reality-Competition Program; Phil Keoghan	Nominated	0 for 2
2010	Creative Arts	Outstanding Picture Editing for Nonfiction Programming (Single or Multi-Camera) for the episode "I Think We're Fighting the Germans. Right?"	Nominated	3 for 7
2010	Creative Arts	Outstanding Directing for Nonfiction Programming for the episode "I Think We're Fighting the Germans. Right?"	Nominated	0 for 3
2010	Creative Arts	Outstanding Cinematography for Reality Program for the episode "I Think We're Fighting the Germans. Right?"	Nominated	2 for 7
2010	Creative Arts	Outstanding Sound Mixing for Nonfiction Programming (Single or Multi-Camera) for the episode "I Think We're Fighting the Germans. Right?"	Nominated	0 for 7
2010	Creative Arts	Outstanding Sound Editing for Nonfiction Programming (Single or Multi-Camera) for the episode "I Think We're Fighting the Germans. Right?"	Nominated	0 for 6
2011	Primetime	Outstanding Reality-Competition Program	Won	8 for 9
2011	Primetime	Outstanding Host for a Reality or Reality-Competition Program; Phil Keoghan	Nominated	0 for 3
2011	Creative Arts	Outstanding Picture Editing for Nonfiction Programming (Single or Multi-Camera) for the episode "You Don't Get Paid Unless You Win"	Nominated	3 for 8
2011	Creative Arts	Outstanding Directing for Nonfiction Programming for the episode "You Don't Get Paid Unless You Win"	Nominated	0 for 4
2011	Creative Arts	Outstanding Cinematography for Reality Program for the episode "You Don't Get Paid Unless You Win"	Nominated	2 for 8
2011	Creative Arts	Outstanding Sound Mixing for Nonfiction Program (Single or Multi-Camera) for the episode "You Don't Get Paid Unless You Win"	Nominated	0 for 8
2011	Creative Arts	Outstanding Sound Editing for Nonfiction Programming (Single or Multi-Camera) for the episode "You Don't Get Paid Unless You Win"	Nominated	0 for 7
2012	Primetime	Outstanding Reality-Competition Program	Won	9 for 10
2012	Primetime	Outstanding Host for a Reality or Reality-Competition Program; Phil Keoghan	Nominated	0 for 4
2012	Creative Arts	Outstanding Picture Editing for Reality Program for the episode "Let Them Drink Their Haterade"	Nominated	3 for 9
2012	Creative Arts	Outstanding Directing for Nonfiction Programming for the episode "Let Them Drink Their Haterade"	Nominated	0 for 5
2012	Creative Arts	Outstanding Cinematography for Reality Program for the episode "Let Them Drink Their Haterade"	Nominated	2 for 9
2012	Creative Arts	Outstanding Sound Mixing for Nonfiction Program (Single or Multi-Camera) for the episode "Let Them Drink Their Haterade"	Nominated	0 for 9
2012	Creative Arts	Outstanding Sound Editing for Nonfiction Programming (Single or Multi-Camera) for the episode "Let Them Drink Their Haterade"	Nominated	0 for 8
2013	Primetime	Outstanding Reality-Competition Program	Nominated	9 for 11
2013	Creative Arts	Outstanding Picture Editing for Reality Programming for the episode "Be Safe and Don't Hit a Cow"	Nominated	3 for 10
2013	Creative Arts	Outstanding Cinematography for a Reality Program for the episode "Be Safe and Don't Hit a Cow"	Nominated	2 for 10
2013	Creative Arts	Outstanding Sound Mixing for a Nonfiction Program (Single or Multi-Camera) for the episode "Be Safe and Don't Hit a Cow"	Nominated	0 for 10
2013	Creative Arts	Outstanding Sound Editing for a Nonfiction Program (Single or Multi-Camera) for the episode "Be Safe and Don't Hit a Cow"	Nominated	0 for 9
2014	Primetime	Outstanding Reality-Competition Program	Won	10 for 12
2014	Creative Arts	Outstanding Directing for Nonfiction Program for the episode "Part Like the Red Sea"	Nominated	0 for 6
2014	Creative Arts	Outstanding Cinematography for Reality Program for the episode "Part Like the Red Sea"	Nominated	2 for 11
2014	Creative Arts	Outstanding Picture Editing for Reality Programming for the episode "Part Like the Red Sea"	Nominated	3 for 11
2014	Creative Arts	Outstanding Sound Mixing for Nonfiction Program (Single or Multi-Camera) for the episode "Part Like the Red Sea"	Nominated	0 for 11
2014	Creative Arts	Outstanding Sound Editing for Nonfiction Programming (Single or Multi-Camera) for the episode "Part Like the Red Sea"	Nominated	0 for 10
2015	Primetime	Outstanding Reality-Competition Program	Nominated	10 for 13
2015	Creative Arts	Outstanding Cinematography for Reality Program for the episode "Morocc'and Roll"	Nominated	2 for 12
2015	Creative Arts	Outstanding Picture Editing for Reality Programm for the episode "Morocc'and Roll"	Nominated	3 for 12
2016	Primetime	Outstanding Reality-Competition Program	Nominated	10 for 14
2016	Creative Arts	Outstanding Cinematography for Reality Program for the episode "We're Only Doing Freaky Stuff Today"	Nominated	2 for 13
2016	Creative Arts	Outstanding Picture Editing for Reality Programming for the episode "We're Only Doing Freaky Stuff Today"	Nominated	3 for 12
2017	Primetime	Outstanding Reality-Competition Program	Nominated	10 for 15
2017	Creative Arts	Outstanding Cinematography for Reality Programm for the episode "Bucket List Type Stuff"	Nominated	2 for 14
2017	Creative Arts	Outstanding Picture Editing for a Structured or Competition Reality Program for the episode "Bucket List Type Stuff"	Nominated	3 for 14
2018	Primetime	Outstanding Reality-Competition Program	Nominated	10 for 16
2018	Creative Arts	Outstanding Directing for a Reality Program; Bertram van Munster, for the episode "It's Just a Million Dollars, No Pressure"	Nominated	0 for 7
2018	Creative Arts	Outstanding Cinematography for Reality Program for the episode "It's Just a Million Dollars, No Pressure"	Nominated	2 for 15
2018	Creative Arts	Outstanding Picture Editing for a Structured or Competition Reality Programg for the episode "It's Just A Million Dollars, No Pressure"	Nominated	3 for 16
2019	Primetime	Outstanding Reality-Competition Program	Nominated	10 for 17
2019	Creative Arts	Outstanding Directing for a Reality Program; Bertram van Munster, for the episode "Who Wants a Rolex?"	Nominated	0 for 8
2019	Creative Arts	Outstanding Picture Editing for a Structured or Competition Reality Program for the episode "Who Wants a Rolex?"	Nominated	3 for 17
2021	Primetime	Outstanding Reality-Competition Program	Nominated	10 of 18
2021	Creative Arts	Outstanding Directing for a Reality Program; Bertram van Munster, for the episode "Give Me a Beard Bump"	Nominated	0 for 9
2021	Creative Arts	Outstanding Cinematography for Reality Program for the episode "Give Me a Beard Bump"	Nominated	2 for 16
2021	Creative Arts	Outstanding Picture Editing for a Structured or Competition Reality Programg for the series body of work	Nominated	3 for 18
2022	Primetime	Outstanding Competition Program	Nominated	10 of 19
2022	Creative Arts	Outstanding Cinematography for Reality Program for the series body of work	Nominated	2 for 17
2023	Primetime	Outstanding Reality-Competition Program	Nominated	10 of 20
2023	Creative Arts	Outstanding Directing for a Reality Program; Bertram van Munster, for the episode "Patience, Is The New Me"	Nominated	0 for 10
2023	Creative Arts	Outstanding Cinematography for Reality Program for the series body of work	Nominated	2 for 18
2023	Creative Arts	Outstanding Picture Editing for a Structured or Competition Reality Program for the series body of work	Nominated	3 for 19
2023	Creative Arts	Outstanding Sound Mixing for a Reality Program (Single or Multi-Camera) for the series body of work	Nominated	0 for 12
2024	Primetime	Outstanding Reality-Competition Program	Nominated	10 of 21
2024	Creative Arts	Outstanding Casting for a Reality Program; Jessie Tannenbaum, Alex Stern, Pollyanna Jacobs & Pedro Gomez	Nominated	0 for 1
2024	Creative Arts	Outstanding Cinematography for Reality Program for the series body of work	Nominated	2 for 19
2024	Creative Arts	Outstanding Picture Editing for a Structured or Competition Reality Program for the series body of work	Nominated	3 for 20
2024	Creative Arts	Outstanding Sound Mixing for a Reality Program (Single or Multi-Camera) for the series body of work	Nominated	0 for 13
2025	Primetime	Outstanding Reality-Competition Program	Nominated	10 of 22
2025	Creative Arts	Outstanding Directing for a Reality Program; Bertram van Munster, for the episode "It Smells Like The Desert"	Nominated	0 for 11
2025	Creative Arts	Outstanding Casting for a Reality Program; Jesse Tannenbaum, Alex Stiner, Kayla Kellerbauer, and Pollyanna Jacobs	Nominated	0 for 2
2025	Creative Arts	Outstanding Cinematography for Reality Program for the series body of work	Nominated	2 for 20
2025	Creative Arts	Outstanding Picture Editing for a Structured or Competition Reality Program for the series body of work	Nominated	3 for 21
2025	Creative Arts	Outstanding Sound Mixing for a Reality Program for the series body of work	Nominated	0 for 14
Total: 15 wins, 103 nominations

The production staff of The Amazing Race has been nominated each year since 2004 for the Producers Guild of America's Golden Laurel award for Television Producer of a Non-Fiction Program, and won this award in 2005.

Bertram van Munster has been nominated six times for the Directors Guild of America Outstanding Directorial Achievement in Reality Programs award for The Amazing Race each year between 2005 and 2010, and winning the award in 2007.

Due to its favorable portrayal of gay couples, The Amazing Race has been nominated in 2004 and 2006 for, but not won, the GLAAD Media Award for Outstanding Reality Program. It has received a similar nomination for 2009, and won in 2012.

=== Home media ===
Seasons 1 and 7 were released in stores, while other seasons have been released exclusively on Amazon.com through its CreateSpace manufacture on demand program. Only region 1 is available. Select seasons have also been released on Blu-ray.

DVD name	Release date
The First Season	September 27, 2005
The Second Season	January 24, 2011
The Third Season	November 22, 2011
The Fourth Season	November 29, 2011
The Fifth Season	April 24, 2012
The Sixth Season	April 24, 2012
The Seventh Season	December 20, 2005
The Eighth Season: Family Edition	October 23, 2012
The Ninth Season	October 23, 2012
The Tenth Season	May 1, 2013
The Eleventh Season: All-Stars	May 1, 2013
The Twelfth Season	March 24, 2014
The Thirteenth Season	April 8, 2014
The Fourteenth Season	May 21, 2014
The Fifteenth Season	May 21, 2014
The Sixteenth Season	November 4, 2014
The Seventeenth Season	November 4, 2014
The Eighteenth Season: Unfinished Business	October 7, 2015
The Nineteenth Season	October 7, 2015
The Twentieth Season	February 13, 2017
The Twenty-First Season	December 9, 2016
The Twenty-Second Season	November 28, 2017
The Twenty-Third Season	November 21, 2017
The Twenty-Fourth Season: All-Stars	November 19, 2017
The Twenty-Fifth Season	November 21, 2017
The Twenty-Sixth Season	November 21, 2017
The Twenty-Seventh Season	November 21, 2017
The Twenty-Eighth Season	October 25, 2018
The Twenty-Ninth Season	October 23, 2018
The Thirtieth Season	May 10, 2019
The Thirty-First Season: Reality Showdown	December 5, 2019
The Thirty-Second Season	June 29, 2021
The Thirty-Third Season	June 14, 2022
The Thirty-Fourth Season	March 21, 2023

The Amazing Race was also added to Pluto TV, ViacomCBS's free Internet television service, as a standalone channel on September 1, 2020.

The fifth and seventh seasons of The Amazing Race were added to Netflix in November 2022. They would later be removed in 2023, being replaced by the seventeenth and thirty-first seasons until its removal in 2024.

All seasons are available to stream on Paramount+ and Amazon Prime Video.

=== Other media ===
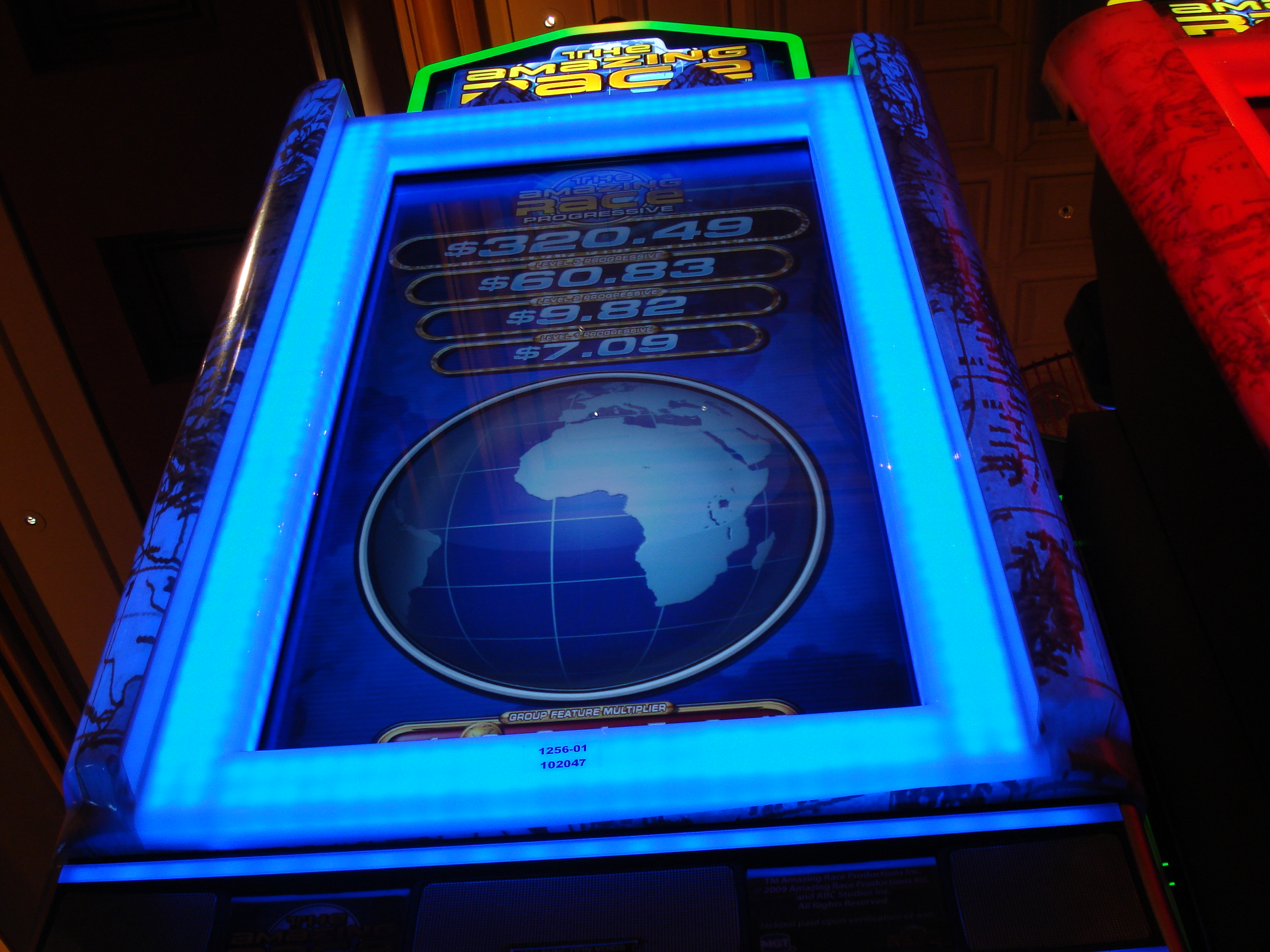
A slot machine based on The Amazing Race that was first installed in casinos in 2010.

Two board games have been made based on The Amazing Race: a DVD Board Game and a traditional board game. A video game for the Wii home game console has been also been produced as well as an iOS version. Both versions were developed by Ludia and published by Ubisoft.

In 2010, International Game Technology (IGT) developed a progressive slot machine game based on The Amazing Race and was installed in casinos across the United States. Phil Keoghan featured prominently in the game and served as host of various bonus rounds, inspired by travel and destinations seen on the show, during play. The slot machines were phased out of casinos a couple of years later.

Two books have been written by fans of the show; the first is written by Adam-Troy Castro, titled "My Ox Is Broken!": Detours, Roadblocks, Fast Forwards and Other Great Moments from TV's The Amazing Race", which features an introduction from Season 8 racers Billy and Carissa Gaghan. The second book is "Circumnavigating the Globe: Amazing Race 10 to 14 and Amazing Race Asia 1 to 3" written by Arthur E. Perkins Jr.

Ahead of the shows 39th season, to celebrate its 25th anniversary, a special Entertainment Tonight episode "The Amazing Race: 25 Years Around the World", aired on September 29, 2026, featuring interviews with Keoghan, the crew, and several past contestants, covering the origins, production, and impact of the show.

=== Legacy ===
"The Amazing Alphabet Race", a segment shown during Sesame Street's 38th season as previewed on NBC's Today Show, is played by Elmo and hosted by "Amazing Al", the muppet version of Phil Keoghan.

- The format of The Amazing Race has led to much smaller scale events for local cities and towns, having teams race through the area with clues and tasks.
- Countries and cities that are featured on the show often see the exposure as a boon. A member of the Icelandic Tourist Board noted that after their country shown as one of the locations in The Amazing Race 6, their website saw an increase in information requests, and they worked to develop a "Trace the Race" travel package to allow visitors to see the same locations shown on the show.
- "Competitours" was created by Steve Belkin to create 8 to 14-days European tours in the style of The Amazing Race; the tourists are only given instructions each night on where they will be traveling next with a Race-like task to do the next day (such as encouraging locals to dance with them at a tourist location), to be demonstrated by recording themselves with a video camera.
- The Amazing Race has inspired popular culture, with notable references to it in shows and films such as Glee, Robot Chicken, Mad TV (in which Charla & Mirna of Season 5 participated), 30 Rock, American Dad! (in which host Phil Keoghan guest starred in the episode), The Simpsons (in the episode "Heartbreak Hotel", where Marge Simpson is shown to be a super-fan of a competition show The Amazing Place), The Lovebirds (which concluded with the protagonists competing on The Amazing Race with a cameo voice-over from Phil Keoghan), iCarly (which referenced the infamous watermelon misfire from Season 17), Better Call Saul (in the episode "Waterworks"), Hacks (in the episode "D'Amazing Race" which host Phil Keoghan and co-creator Elise Doganieri guest starred), and even Sesame Street. The Canadian cartoon/reality show Total Drama Presents: The Ridonculous Race is a direct parody of The Amazing Race. Additionally, an episode titled "The Amazing Model Race" of the twelfth cycle of America's Next Top Model, featured a race-themed challenge.
- Edutainment YouTuber Sam Denby, co-creator of YouTube/Nebula game show Jet Lag: The Game, cites The Amazing Race as a substantial inspiration for his show, although he has stated that his show differs in that it incorporates travel into the gameplay more directly, and that due to being shot vlog-style by the players themselves (rather than with TV film crews), it is able to more accurately capture the spontaneity real-life travel experience.
