= Primetime Emmy Award for Outstanding Sound Mixing for a Reality Program =

- Awarded for: Outstanding Sound Mixing for a Reality Program
- Country: United States
- Presented by: Academy of Television Arts & Sciences
- Currently held by: Welcome to Wrexham (2026)
- Website: emmys.com

The Primetime Emmy Award for Outstanding Sound Mixing for a Reality Program is awarded to one reality series each year. Prior to 2023, nonfiction programs and reality programs competed together. From 2019 to 2022, nominations were proportional to the number of submissions of each. They were split in 2023 with Outstanding Sound Mixing for a Nonfiction Program becoming its own category.

== Winners and nominations ==
=== 2000s ===
Year	Program	Episode	Nominees	Network
2001	Survivor	"Episode 1"	Terrance Dwyer	CBS
2001	The Beatles Revolution		Ken Hahn, David Jaunai, Ashley Howe	ABC
2001	Behind the Music	"John Lennon: The Last Years"	Earl Martin, Richard Gray	VH1
2001	Jazz	"Dedicated to Chaos"	Dominick Tavella	PBS
2001	Living Dolls: The Making of a Child Beauty Queen		John McCormick, Mitch Dorf	HBO
2002	9/11		Grant Maxwell, Ken Hahn, Danny Caccavo	CBS
2002	The Blue Planet	"The Deep"	Graham Wild	Discovery
2002	In Memoriam: New York City		Larry Rock, Ken Hahn	HBO
2002	Recording 'The Producers': A Musical Romp with Mel Brooks (Great Performances)		Peter Miller, Roger Phenix, Lee Dichter	PBS
2002	The True Story of Black Hawk Down		Marcus Pardo	History
2003	American Masters	"Joni Mitchell: Woman of Heart and Mind"	Peter Waggoner	PBS
2003	American Idol	"Finale"	Klaus Landsberg, Brian Riordan	Fox
2003	The Day the Towers Fell		Sammy Jackson, Scott Delaney	History
2003	Expedition: Bismarck		Ben Zarai, Ken Skoglund, Eric Reuveni, Aaron F. Quirk, Buck Robinson	Discovery
2003	Journeys with George		Coll Anderson	HBO
2004	Dinosaur Planet	"Pod's Travels" / "Alpha's Egg"	Mike Olman, Ken Kobett	Discovery
2004	The Amazing Race	"I Could Never Have Been Prepared for What I'm Looking at Right Now"	Troy Smith	CBS
2004	American Masters	"Judy Garland: By Myself"	Ed Campbell	PBS
2004	Failure Is Not an Option		Greg McCleary	History
2004	Survivor	"They're Back"	Terrance Dwyer, Jeremy Ireland, Heron Alencar, Roger Arguello, Rick Armstrong, Jerry Masanky Chabane, Christina Chin, Dan Foster, Richard Hill, Matthias Hoffman, Tony Jensen, Chris Kelly, Drew Levinson, Terry Meehan, Robert MacKay, Mike Ormsby, Rob Rosales, Bram Tulloch, Jim Ursulak	CBS
2005	Broadway: The American Musical	"Oh, What a Beautiful Mornin'"	Ed Campbell	PBS
2005	The Amazing Race	"We're Moving Up the Food Chain"	Troy Smith, Jim Ursulak, Heron Alencar, Gary Azzinaro, Tyler Bender, Stephen Crawley, Dean Gaveau, Brian Johnson, Peter Jones, William Minchin, Gustavo Gama Rodrigues, Kris Bagley, Barry Weissman	CBS
2005	American Idol	"Episode 401/402"	Brian Riordan	Fox
2005	America's Deadliest Season: Alaskan Crab Fishing	"The Clock's Ticking"	Bob Bronow	Discovery
2005	Survivor	"Love Is in the Air, Rats Are Everywhere"	Terrance Dwyer, Jeremy Ireland, Christina Chin, Tony Jensen, Robert MacKay, Terry Meehan, Chris Kelly, Molefi J. Chabane, Dan Foster, Mike Ormsby, Steve Guercio, Scott Hanlon, Michael St. Hilaire, Colette Stewart, Jonathan Andrews, Drew Levinson	CBS
2006	American Masters	"No Direction Home: Bob Dylan"	Tom Fleischman	PBS
2006	The Amazing Race	"Here Comes the Bedouin!"	Troy Smith, Jim Ursulak, Jerry Masanky Chabane, Peter Jones	CBS
2006	Baghdad ER		Jon Alpert, Matthew O'Neill, Paul Hsu	HBO
2006	Deadliest Catch	"The Clock's Ticking"	Bob Bronow	Discovery
2006	Survivor	"Big Trek, Big Trouble, Big Surprise"	Terrance Dwyer, Jeremy Ireland, Matthias Hoffman, Tony Jensen	CBS
2007	American Masters	"Atlantic Records: The House That Ahmet Built"	Ed Campbell	PBS
2007	The Amazing Race	"I Know Phil, Little Ol' Gorgeous Thing"	Jim Ursulak, Jerry Masanky Chabane, Dean Gaveau, Barry Weissman, Peter Wong, Troy Smith	CBS
2007	Deadliest Catch	"The Unforgiving Sea"	Bob Bronow	Discovery
2007	Planet Earth	"Pole to Pole"	Graham Wild	Discovery
2007	When the Levees Broke: A Requiem in Four Acts		Ken Ishii, Stuart Deutsch, Charles R. Hunt, Bo Walker, Bob Chefalas, Douglas Murray	HBO
2008	American Masters	"Tony Bennett: The Music Never Ends"	Jason King	PBS
2008	The Amazing Race	"Honestly, They Have Witch Powers or Something"	Jim Ursulak, Jerry Masanky Chabane, Dean Gaveau, Troy Smith	CBS
2008	Deadliest Catch	"No Mercy"	Bob Bronow	Discovery
2008	The War	"When Things Get Tough"	Dominick Tavella	PBS
2009	102 Minutes That Changed America		Damon Trotta	History
2009	The Amazing Race	"Don't Let a Cheese Hit Me"	Jim Ursulak, Jerry Masanky Chabane, Dean Gaveau, Troy Smith	CBS
2009	American Idol	"Episode 801/802"	Brian Riordan, Adrian Ordonez	Fox
2009	Deadliest Catch	"Stay Focused or Die"	Bob Bronow	Discovery
2009	Survivor	"The Poison Apple Needs to Go"	Robert Mackay, Terry Meehan, Christopher Kelly, Terrance Dwyer	CBS

=== 2010s ===
Year	Program	Episode	Nominees	Network
2010	Deadliest Catch	"No Second Chances"	Bob Bronow	Discovery
2010	The Amazing Race	"I Think We're Fighting the Germans, Right?"	Jim Ursulak, Dean Gaveau, Jerry Masanky Chabane, Troy Smith	CBS
2010	Life	"Challenges of Life"	Graham Wild, John Rigatuso	Discovery
2010	The National Parks: America's Best Idea	"The Scripture of Nature"	Dominick Tavella	PBS
2010	Spectacle: Elvis Costello with...	"Bruce Springsteen"	Neil Cedar	Sundance Channel
2011	Deadliest Catch	"Redemption Day"	Bob Bronow	Discovery
2011	The Amazing Race	"You Don't Get Paid Unless You Win"	Jim Ursulak, Dean Gaveau, Jerry Masanky Chabane, Troy Smith	CBS
2011	American Idol	"Auditions No. 2: New Orleans"	Brian Riordan, Kamal Humphrey, Phil Valdivia, Chris Tront	Fox
2011	American Masters	"LENNONYC"	Ed Campbell	PBS
2011	Gettysburg		Dieter Keck	History
2012	Paul Simon's Graceland Journey: Under African Skies		Tom Paul	A&E
2012	The Amazing Race	"Let Them Drink Their Haterade"	Jim Ursulak, Dean Gaveau, Jerry Masanky Chabane, Troy Smith	CBS
2012	Deadliest Catch	"I Don't Wanna Die"	Bob Bronow	Discovery
2012	Frozen Planet	"Ends of the Earth"	Graham Wild, Archie Moore	Discovery
2012	George Harrison: Living in the Material World		Tom Fleischman and Bob Chefalas	HBO
2013	History of the Eagles		Tom Fleischman, Bret Johnson, Richard F.W. Davis, Elliot Scheiner, Mike Harlow	Showtime
2013	The Amazing Race	"Be Safe and Don't Hit a Cow"	Jim Ursulak, Dean Gaveau, Jerry Masanky Chabane, Troy Smith	CBS
2013	Anthony Bourdain: Parts Unknown	"Myanmar"	Benny Mouthon	CNN
2013	Crossfire Hurricane		Jason W. Jennings, Steve Pederson	HBO
2013	Deadliest Catch	"Mutiny on the Bering Sea"	Bob Bronow	Discovery
2013	Survivor	"Create a Little Chaos"	Terrance Dwyer	CBS
2014	American Masters	"Jimi Hendrix: Hear My Train A Comin'"	Eddie Kramer, Steve Crook	PBS
2014	The Amazing Race	"Part Like the Red Sea"	Jim Ursulak, Dean Gaveau, Jerry Masanky Chabane, Troy Smith	CBS
2014	Anthony Bourdain: Parts Unknown	"Tokyo"	Brian Bracken	CNN
2014	Cosmos: A Spacetime Odyssey	"Standing Up in the Milky Way"	Mark Hensley, Joel D. Catalan, Paul Aronoff, David Torres	Fox
2014	Deadliest Catch	"Careful What You Wish For"	Bob Bronow	Discovery
2015	Foo Fighters: Sonic Highways	"Seattle"	Fred Stuben, Jeffrey Fuller, Eddie Kim	HBO
2015	Anthony Bourdain: Parts Unknown	"Jamaica"	Brian Bracken	CNN
2015	Deadliest Catch	"Lost at Sea"	Bob Bronow	Discovery
2015	Going Clear: Scientology and the Prison of Belief		David Mitlyng, Tony Volante	HBO
2015	The Jinx: The Life and Deaths of Robert Durst	"Chapter 2: Poor Little Rich Boy"	Tim Hays, Paul Vik Marshall, Coll Anderson	HBO
2015	Kurt Cobain: Montage of Heck		Steve Pederson	HBO
2016	Vice	"Fighting ISIS"	Erik Schuiten	HBO
2016	Anthony Bourdain: Parts Unknown	"Ethiopia"	Benny Mouthon	CNN
2016	Deadliest Catch	"Carpe Diem"	Bob Bronow	Discovery
2016	Making a Murderer	"Lack of Humanity"	Leslie Shatz	Netflix
2016	What Happened, Miss Simone?		Tony Volante, Tammy Douglas	Netflix
2017	The Beatles: Eight Days a Week — The Touring Years		Chris Jenkins, Cameron Frankley, Nathan Evans, Sam O'Kell	Hulu
2017	Anthony Bourdain: Parts Unknown	"Rome"	Brian Bracken	CNN
2017	O.J.: Made in America	"Part 2"	Keith Hodne, Eric Di Stefano	ESPN
2017	Planet Earth II	"Cities"	Graham Wild	BBC America
2017	13th		Jeffrey Perkins	Netflix
2018
2018	Anthony Bourdain: Parts Unknown	"Lagos"	Benny Mouthon	CNN
2018	The Defiant Ones	"Episode 1"	Christopher Jenkins, Gabriel Andy Giner	HBO
2018	Jane		David E. Fluhr, Marc Fishman, Lee Smith, Derek Lee	Nat Geo
2018	The Vietnam War	"Episode 6: Things Fall Apart (January 1968 – July 1968)"	Dominick Tavella	PBS
2018	Wild Wild Country	"Part 1"	Chapman Way	Netflix
2019
2019	Free Solo		Tom Fleischman, Ric Schnupp, Tyson Lozensky, Jim Hurst	Nat Geo
2019	Anthony Bourdain: Parts Unknown	"Kenya"	Brian Bracken	CNN
2019	Fyre: The Greatest Party That Never Happened		Tom Paul	Netflix
2019	Leaving Neverland		Matt Skilton, Marguerite Gaudin	HBO
2019	Our Planet	"One Planet"	Graham Wild	Netflix

=== 2020s ===
Year	Program	Episode	Nominees	Network
Primetime Emmy Award for Outstanding Sound Mixing for a Nonfiction or Reality Program (Single or Multi-Camera)
2020
2020	Apollo 11		Eric Milano	CNN
2020	Beastie Boys Story		William Tzouris, Jacob Feinberg and Martyn Zub	Apple TV+
2020	Cheer	"Daytona"	Ryan David Adams	Netflix
2020	Laurel Canyon: A Place in Time		Gary A. Rizzo, Stephen Urata, Danielle Dupre and Tony Villaflor	Epix
2020	RuPaul's Drag Race	"I'm That Bitch"	Glenn Gaines, Ryan Brady, Erik Valenzuela and Sal Ojeda	VH1
2020	Tiger King: Murder, Mayhem and Madness	"The Noble Thing to Do"	Jose Araujo, Royce Sharp, Jack Neu and Ian Cymore	Netflix
2021
2021	David Attenborough: A Life on Our Planet		Graham Wild	Netflix
2021	The Bee Gees: How Can You Mend a Broken Heart		Gary A. Rizzo, Jeff King and John Rampey	HBO
2021	Billie Eilish: The World's a Little Blurry		Elmo Ponsdomenech, Jason "Frenchie" Gaya, Aron Forbes and Jae Kim	Apple TV+
2021	Life Below Zero	"The Other Side"	Tony Crowe	Nat Geo
2021	Stanley Tucci: Searching for Italy	"Naples and the Amalfi Coast"	Tom O'Pray and Chris Gibbions	CNN
2021	Tina		Lawrence Everson and Phil McGowan	HBO
2022
2022	The Beatles: Get Back	"Part 3: Days 17–22"	Michael Hedges, Brent Burge, Alexis Feodoroff and Giles Martin	Disney+
2022	George Carlin's American Dream		Earl Martin, Jason Gaya, Brad Bergbom and Kevin Rosen Quan	HBO Max
2022	Lizzo's Watch Out for the Big Grrrls	"Becoming 100% That Bitch"	Erik Brena, Ross D'Alessandro, Julianne Kane and Deanna Decenario	Prime Video
2022	McCartney 3,2,1	"These Things Bring You Together"	Gary A. Rizzo and Laura Cunningham	Hulu
2022	RuPaul's Drag Race	"Big Opening #1"	Erik Valenzuela, David Nolte and Glenn Gaines	VH1
2022	Stanley Tucci: Searching for Italy	"Venice"	Tom O'Pray and Renato Ferrari	CNN
Primetime Emmy Award for Outstanding Sound Mixing for a Reality Program (Single or Multi-Camera)
2023
2023	Welcome to Wrexham	"Do or Die"	Mark Jensen	FX
2023	The Amazing Race	"The Only Leg That Matters"	Jim Ursulak, Troy Smith and The Amazing Race Production Mixing Team	CBS
2023	Deadliest Catch	"Call of a New Generation"	Jared Robbins	Discovery
2023	RuPaul's Drag Race	"Wigloose: The Rusical!"	Erik Valenzuela, Sal Ojeda, David Nolte and Gabe Lopez	MTV
2023	The Voice	"Live Top 10"	Michael Abbott, Randy Faustino, Tim Hatayama and The Voice Production Mixing Team	NBC
Primetime Emmy Award for Outstanding Sound Mixing for a Reality Program
2024
2024	Welcome to Wrexham	"Giant Killers"	Mark Jensen	FX
2024	The Amazing Race		Troy Smith, Jim Ursulak, Jim Blank, Emerson Boergadine, Paul Bruno, John Buchanan, Jerry Chabane, Alfredo R. Del Portillo, Freddie DiPasquale, Dean Gaveau, Ryan P. Kelly, Richard Chardy Lopez, Mickey McMullen, Sean Milburn, Simon Paine, John A. Pitron, Jody Stillwater and Jeff Zipp	CBS
2024	Deadliest Catch	"Nautical Deathtrap"	Jared Robbins	Discovery
2024	RuPaul's Drag Race		Sal Ojeda, Erik Valenzuela, Ryan Brady, David Nolte and Andrew Papastephanou	MTV
2024	The Voice	"Live Finale"	Michael Abbott, Kenyata Westbrook, Randy Faustino, Christian Schrader, Carlos A. Torres, Andrew Fletcher, Shaun Sebastian, Tim Hatayama, Adrian Ordonez, Barry Weir Jr. and Ryan Young	NBC
2025
2025	Welcome to Wrexham	"Down to the Wire"	Mark Jensen	FX
2025	The Amazing Race		Jim Ursulak, Allie Boettger, Paul Bruno, John Buchanan, Dean Gaveau, Ryan P. Kelly, Marcus Lominy, Richard Chardy Lopez, Mickey McMullen, Sean Milburn, Paul Orozco, Simon Paine, John Pitron, Jeff Zipp, Troy Smith and Ryan Gerle	CBS
2025	American Idol	"Grand Finale"	Patrick Smith, Randy Faustino, Michael Parker, Manny Barrajas, Christian Schrader, Jesse Dunham, Barry Weir Jr. and Adrian Ordonez	ABC
2025	Deadliest Catch	"My Brother's Keeper"	Jared Robbins	Discovery
2025	The Voice	"Live Finale, Part 2"	Michael Abbott, Randy Faustino, Tim Hatayama, Christian Schrader, Carlos Torres, Andrew Fletcher, Shaun Sebastian, Kenyata Westbrook, Colin Bonney, Servio Escobedo, John Koster, Robert P. Matthews Jr., Marlon Moore and Ryan Young	NBC
2026
2026	Welcome to Wrexham	"Do a Wrexham"	Mark Jensen	FX
2026	The Amazing Race		Jim Ursulak, Allie Boettger, Paul Bruno, John Buchanan, Molefi Jerry Chabane, Dean Gaveau, Ryan P. Kelly, Marcus Lominy, Mickey McMullen, Sean Milburn, Simon Paine, John A. Pitron, Jeff Zipp, Ryan Gerle, Troy Smith, Freddie DiPasquale, Chase Mollak and Jody Stillwater	CBS
2026	Deadliest Catch	"Kings of the Frozen North"	Jared Robbins	Discovery
2026	RuPaul's Drag Race	"Fannie: The Hard Knock Ball Rusical"	David Nolte, Gregory Keslake, Ryan Brady, Erik Valenzuela and Sal Ojeda	MTV
2026	The Voice	"The Blind Auditions Premiere"	Michael Abbott, Jeff Fusting, Randy Faustino, Tim Hatayama, Shaun Sebastian, Ryan Young and Phil DeTolve	NBC

== Programs with multiple awards ==
4 awards

- Welcome to Wrexham

2 awards

- Deadliest Catch

== Programs with multiple nominations ==
15 nominations

- The Amazing Race

14 nominations

- Deadliest Catch

6 nominations

- Survivor

5 nominations

- American Idol
- RuPaul's Drag Race

4 nominations

- The Voice
- Welcome to Wrexham
