= List of The Amazing Race (American TV series) episodes =

The Amazing Race is an American adventure reality game show in which teams of two race around the world (except the Family Edition which featured teams of four and was raced entirely in North America). The show premiered on CBS on September 5, 2001 and is hosted by Phil Keoghan, and aired semi-annually between fall and late winter/early spring from 2001 until 2016, then annually from 2017 to 2022, before headed back to semi-annually in the TV schedule since the 2023–24 television season, and back to annually in the 2025–26 and 2026–27 series.

As of October 14, 2026, 449 episodes of The Amazing Race have aired, currently in its thirty-ninth season. In January 2026, the series was renewed for a thirty-ninth season for the 2026–27 TV season.

Since the second season, episode titles are taken from quotes made by the racers in each episode. Quotes were sometimes altered slightly for humorous effect.

== Series overview ==
Season	Episodes	Originally released		Winners	Teams	Legs
Season	Episodes	First released	Last released	Winners	Teams	Legs
1	13	September 5, 2001	December 13, 2001	Rob Frisbee & Brennan Swain	11	13
2	11	March 11, 2002	May 15, 2002	Chris Luca & Alex Boylan	11	13
3	11	October 2, 2002	December 18, 2002	Flo Pesenti & Zach Behr	12	13
4	13	May 29, 2003	August 21, 2003	Reichen Lehmkuhl & Chip Arndt	12	13
5	12	July 6, 2004	September 21, 2004	Chip & Kim McAllister	11	13
6	13	November 16, 2004	February 8, 2005	Freddy Holliday & Kendra Bentley	11	12
7	12	March 1, 2005	May 10, 2005	Uchenna & Joyce Agu	11	12
8	12	September 27, 2005	December 13, 2005	Nick, Alex, Megan, & Tommy Linz	10	11
9	12	February 28, 2006	May 17, 2006	B. J. Averell & Tyler MacNiven	11	12
10	13	September 17, 2006	December 10, 2006	Tyler Denk & James Branaman	12	12
11	12	February 18, 2007	May 6, 2007	Eric Sanchez & Danielle Turner	11	13
12	11	November 4, 2007	January 20, 2008	TK Erwin & Rachel Rosales	11	11
13	11	September 28, 2008	December 7, 2008	Nick & Starr Spangler	11	11
14	12	February 15, 2009	May 10, 2009	Tammy & Victor Jih	11	11
15	11	September 27, 2009	December 6, 2009	Meghan Rickey & Cheyne Whitney	12	12
16	12	February 14, 2010	May 9, 2010	Dan & Jordan Pious	11	12
17	12	September 26, 2010	December 12, 2010	Nat Strand & Kat Chang	11	12
18	11	February 20, 2011	May 8, 2011	Kisha & Jen Hoffman	11	12
19	12	September 25, 2011	December 11, 2011	Ernie Halvorsen & Cindy Chiang	11	12
20	11	February 19, 2012	May 6, 2012	Rachel & Dave Brown, Jr.	11	12
21	11	September 30, 2012	December 9, 2012	Josh Kilmer-Purcell & Brent Ridge	11	12
22	11	February 17, 2013	May 5, 2013	Bates & Anthony Battaglia	11	12
23	11	September 29, 2013	December 8, 2013	Jason Case & Amy Diaz	11	12
24	12	February 23, 2014	May 18, 2014	Dave & Connor O'Leary	11	12
25	12	September 26, 2014	December 19, 2014	Amy DeJong & Maya Warren	11	12
26	12	February 25, 2015	May 15, 2015	Laura Pierson & Tyler Adams	11	12
27	12	September 25, 2015	December 18, 2015	Kelsey Gerckens & Joey Buttitta	11	12
28	12	February 12, 2016	May 13, 2016	Dana Borriello & Matt Steffanina	11	12
29	12	March 30, 2017	June 1, 2017	Brooke Camhi & Scott Flanary	11	12
30	8	January 3, 2018	February 21, 2018	Cody Nickson & Jessica Graf	11	12
31	11	April 17, 2019	June 26, 2019	Colin Guinn & Christie Woods	11	12
32	12	October 14, 2020	December 16, 2020	Will Jardell & James Wallington	11	11
33	11	January 5, 2022	March 2, 2022	Kim & Penn Holderness	11	11
34	12	September 21, 2022	December 7, 2022	Derek Xiao & Claire Rehfuss	12	10
35	12	September 27, 2023	December 13, 2023	Greg & John Franklin	13	12
36	10	March 13, 2024	May 15, 2024	Ricky Rotandi & Cesar Aldrete	13	11
37	12	March 5, 2025	May 15, 2025	Carson McCalley & Jack Dodge	14	12
38	12	September 25, 2025	December 10, 2025	Jas & Jag Bains	13	12
39	TBA	September 30, 2026	TBA	TBA	13	12

== Episodes ==
=== Season 21 (2012) ===
No. overall	No. in season	Title	Original release date	U.S. viewers (millions)	Rating/share (18–49)
238	1	"Double Your Money"	September 30, 2012	9.40	2.5/6
239	2	"Long Hair, Don't Care"	October 7, 2012	9.66	2.6/6
240	3	"There's No Crying in Baseball"	October 14, 2012	9.11	2.6/7
241	4	"Funky Monkey"	October 21, 2012	9.54	2.6/5
242	5	"Chill Out, Freak"	October 28, 2012	9.41	2.5/6
243	6	"Get Your Sexy On"	November 4, 2012	10.20	2.6/6
244	7	"Off to See the Wizard"	November 11, 2012	9.18	2.5/6
245	8	"We Was Robbed"	November 18, 2012	9.59	2.4/6
246	9	"Fishy Kiss"	November 25, 2012	9.58	2.5/6
247	10	"Not a Well-Rounded Athlete"	December 2, 2012	10.02	2.7/6
248	11	"Take Down That Million"	December 9, 2012	9.35	2.6/6

=== Season 22 (2013) ===
No. overall	No. in season	Title	Original release date	U.S. viewers (millions)	Rating/share (18–49)
249	1	"Business in the Front, Party in the Back"	February 17, 2013	9.57	2.5/6
250	2	"Loose Lips Sink Ships"	February 24, 2013	6.95	1.9/4
251	3	"Like James Bond Again"	March 3, 2013	9.24	2.5/6
252	4	"I Love Monkeys!"	March 10, 2013	9.27	2.4/7
253	5	"Your Tan Is Totally Cool"	March 17, 2013	8.91	2.3/6
254	6	"Scorpion King Hunter"	March 24, 2013	9.33	2.4/7
255	7	"Be Safe and Don't Hit a Cow"	March 31, 2013	9.24	2.3/6
256	8	"My Cheese is Out of Control"	April 14, 2013	9.76	2.3/6
257	9	"The Ultimate Fun House"	April 21, 2013	9.16	2.4/7
258	10	"Working Our Barrels Off"	April 28, 2013	9.32	2.4/7
259	11	"Beacon of Hope"	May 5, 2013	9.10	2.4/7

=== Season 23 (2013) ===
No. overall	No. in season	Title	Original release date	U.S. viewers (millions)	Rating/share (18–49)
260	1	"We're Not in Oklahoma No More"	September 29, 2013	8.62	2.0/5
261	2	"Zip It, Bingo"	October 6, 2013	9.74	2.4/6
262	3	"King Arthur Style"	October 13, 2013	8.08	1.9/5
263	4	"Beards in the Wind"	October 20, 2013	8.87	1.9/5
264	5	"Get Our Groove On"	October 27, 2013	8.11	1.8/4
265	6	"Choir Boy at Heart"	November 3, 2013	9.38	2.1/5
266	7	"Speed Dating Is the Worst"	November 10, 2013	9.12	2.2/5
267	8	"One Hot Camel"	November 17, 2013	9.12	2.0/5
268	9	"Part Like the Red Sea"	November 24, 2013	7.97	1.6/4
269	10	"Cobra in My Teeth"	December 1, 2013	10.29	2.1/4
270	11	"Amazing Crazy Race"	December 8, 2013	9.21	2.1/5

=== Season 24: All-Stars (2014) ===
No. overall	No. in season	Title	Original release date	U.S. viewers (millions)	Rating/share (18–49)
271	1	"Back in the Saddle"	February 23, 2014	6.71	1.5/4
272	2	"Baby Bear's Soup"	March 2, 2014	6.10	1.5/4
273	3	"Welcome to the Jungle"	March 9, 2014	8.46	1.9/5
274	4	"Smarter, Not Harder"	March 16, 2014	8.30	1.8/5
275	5	"Can't Make Fish Bite"	March 23, 2014	8.70	1.8/5
276	6	"Down and Dirty"	March 30, 2014	9.51	2.0/5
277	7	"The Gladiators Are Here!"	April 13, 2014	8.83	1.8/5
278	8	"Donkeylicious"	April 20, 2014	7.65	1.8/5
279	9	"Accidental Alliance"	April 27, 2014	8.45	1.9/6
280	10	"Bull Down"	May 4, 2014	8.09	1.7/5
281	11	"Hei Ho Heidi Ho"	May 11, 2014	7.37	1.7/5
282	12	"Do You Believe in Magic?"	May 18, 2014	8.22	1.8/5

=== Season 25 (2014) ===
No. overall	No. in season	Title	Original release date	U.S. viewers (millions)	Rating/share (18–49)
283	1	"Go Big or Go Home"	September 26, 2014	5.48	1.1/4
284	2	"When You Gotta Go, You Gotta Go"	October 3, 2014	6.08	1.2/5
285	3	"Get Your Sheep Together"	October 10, 2014	5.89	1.1/4
286	4	"Thinly Sliced Anchovies"	October 17, 2014	6.57	1.4/6
287	5	"Morocc'and Roll"	October 24, 2014	5.51	1.0/4
288	6	"I Feel Like I Just Kissed a Goat"	October 31, 2014	5.89	1.1/5
289	7	"Pretty Fly for a Food Scientist"	November 7, 2014	6.05	1.2/3
290	8	"Hot Sexy Knights"	November 21, 2014	5.95	1.2/4
291	9	"You're Taking My Tan Off"	November 28, 2014	5.42	1.0/3
292	10	"Smells Like Dirty Tube Socks"	December 5, 2014	6.22	1.2/4
293	11	"Hooping It Up"	December 12, 2014	5.99	1.2/4
294	12	"All or Nothing"	December 19, 2014	6.59	1.3/5

=== Season 26 (2015) ===
No. overall	No. in season	Title	Original release date	U.S. viewers (millions)	Rating/share (18–49)
295	1	"Great Way to Start a Relationship"	February 25, 2015	6.16	1.5/4
296	2	"I Got the Smartest Dude"	February 27, 2015	6.15	1.1/4
297	3	"#MurphysLaw"	March 6, 2015	6.07	1.2/5
298	4	"The Great Amazing Nasty Race"	March 13, 2015	6.29	1.3/5
299	5	"Get in That Lederhosen, Baby"	April 3, 2015	6.05	1.3/5
300	6	"Smells Like a Million Bucks"	April 10, 2015	6.05	1.3/5
301	7	"Back in Business"	April 17, 2015	5.54	1.1/4
302	8	"Moment of Truth"	April 17, 2015	5.54	1.1/4
303	9	"Can I Get a Hot Tub!"	April 24, 2015	5.75	1.1/4
304	10	"Fruits of Our Labor"	May 1, 2015	5.52	1.1/5
305	11	"In It or Win It"	May 8, 2015	5.48	1.1/5
306	12	"Monster Truck Heroes"	May 15, 2015	5.72	1.1/5

=== Season 27 (2015) ===
No. overall	No. in season	Title	Original release date	U.S. viewers (millions)	Rating/share (18–49)
307	1	"A Little Too Much Beefcake"	September 25, 2015	5.82	1.2/5
308	2	"Get in There and Think Like a Dog"	October 2, 2015	5.98	1.2/5
309	3	"Where My Dogs At?"	October 9, 2015	5.92	1.1/5
310	4	"Good Old Fashioned Spit in the Face"	October 16, 2015	5.92	1.1/5
311	5	"King of the Jungle"	October 23, 2015	5.94	1.2/5
312	6	"My Tongue Doesn't Even Twist That Way"	October 30, 2015	6.07	1.2/5
313	7	"Full Speed Ahead, Captain!"	November 6, 2015	5.83	1.1/4
314	8	"Krakow, I'm Gonna Get You"	November 13, 2015	5.68	1.1/4
315	9	"It's Always the Quiet Ones"	November 20, 2015	6.03	1.0/4
316	10	"Bring the Fun, Baby!"	November 27, 2015	5.53	1.0/4
317	11	"It's Not Easy Beating Green"	December 4, 2015	5.75	1.1/5
318	12	"We Got a Chance, Baby!"	December 11, 2015	6.16	1.0/4

=== Season 28 (2016) ===
No. overall	No. in season	Title	Original release date	U.S. viewers (millions)	Rating/share (18–49)
319	1	"I Should've Been a Boy Scout"	February 12, 2016	6.09	1.3/5
320	2	"You Look Like Gollum"	February 19, 2016	5.82	1.1/4
321	3	"Bros Being Jocks"	February 26, 2016	5.69	1.1/4
322	4	"Get It Trending"	March 4, 2016	5.79	1.1/4
323	5	"We're Only Doing Freaky Stuff Today"	March 11, 2016	5.45	1.0/4
324	6	"Let the Good Times Roll"	April 1, 2016	5.83	1.1/5
325	7	"Welcome to Bloody Fingers 101"	April 8, 2016	5.51	1.1/5
326	8	"I Have a Wedgie and a Half"	April 15, 2016	5.47	1.0/4
327	9	"Salt That Sand!"	April 22, 2016	5.43	1.0/4
328	10	"Monkey Dance!"	April 29, 2016	5.44	0.9/4
329	11	"That's Money, Honey"	May 6, 2016	5.19	0.9/4
330	12	"The Only First That Matters"	May 13, 2016	5.93	1.1/4

=== Season 29 (2017) ===
No. overall	No. in season	Title	Original release date	U.S. viewers (millions)	Rating/share (18–49)
331	1	"We're Coming for You, Phil!"	March 30, 2017	4.30	0.9/3
332	2	"Scared Spitless"	April 6, 2017	3.99	0.9/4
333	3	"Bucket List Type Stuff"	April 13, 2017	4.18	0.8/3
334	4	"Another One Bites the Dust"	April 20, 2017	4.40	0.9/4
335	5	"Have Faith in Me, Broski"	April 20, 2017	3.84	0.8/3
336	6	"Double U-Turn Ahead"	April 27, 2017	3.80	0.7/3
337	7	"Have Fun and Get It Done"	May 4, 2017	4.01	0.9/4
338	8	"Good Job, Donkey"	May 11, 2017	4.04	0.9/3
339	9	"I Thought Were Playing It Nice"	May 18, 2017	4.42	0.9/4
340	10	"Riding a Bike Is Like Riding a Bike"	May 18, 2017	3.86	0.8/3
341	11	"As Easy As Stacking Cups"	May 25, 2017	3.63	0.6/3
342	12	"We're Going to Victory Lane"	June 1, 2017	3.92	0.8/3

=== Season 30 (2018) ===
No. overall	No. in season	Title	Original release date	U.S. viewers (millions)	Rating/share (18–49)
343	1	"You're a Champion, Prove It"	January 3, 2018	7.33	1.6/6
344	2	"You're the Best French Fry Ever"	January 10, 2018	6.98	1.4/5
345	3	"It's Gonna Be a Fragrant Day"	January 17, 2018	6.89	1.5/6
346	4	"Gotta Put Your Sole Onto It"	January 24, 2018	6.17	1.2/5
347	5	"The Claws Are Out"	January 31, 2018	6.54	1.3/5
348	6	"All's Fair in Love and War"	February 7, 2018	5.07	1.1/4
349	7	"The First Rule of Amazing Race Club"	February 14, 2018	4.12	0.9/3
350	8	"It's Just a Million Dollars, No Pressure"	February 21, 2018	4.34	0.9/3

=== Season 31: Reality Showdown (2019) ===
No. overall	No. in season	Title	Original release date	U.S. viewers (millions)	Rating/share (18–49)
351	1	"You're in Our Race Now"	April 17, 2019	5.74	1.2/6
352	2	"Knock the Newbie Out of Us"	April 24, 2019	4.65	1.0/5
353	3	"Hey, Fishy, Fishy, Fishy"	May 1, 2019	4.50	0.9/4
354	4	"I Took Out a Polar Bear"	May 8, 2019	4.44	0.8/4
355	5	"I'm a Bird, I'm a Plane, I'm on The Amazing Race"	May 22, 2019	4.50	0.9/5
356	6	"Who Wants a Rolex?"	May 22, 2019	3.70	0.7/4
357	7	"Living Fearlessly"	May 29, 2019	4.74	0.8/4
358	8	"You're the Apple in My Eye"	June 5, 2019	4.67	0.9/5
359	9	"Let's Split"	June 12, 2019	4.66	0.8/4
360	10	"Chugga Chugga Choo Choo!"	June 19, 2019	4.75	0.8/5
361	11	"This One Is for One Million Dollars"	June 26, 2019	3.82	0.7/4

=== Season 32 (2020) ===
No. overall	No. in season	Title	Original release date	U.S. viewers (millions)	Rating/share (18–49)
362	1	"One Million Miles"	October 14, 2020	3.58	0.7/4
363	2	"Red Lipstick is Not My Color"	October 21, 2020	3.30	0.7/4
364	3	"We're Makin' Big Moves"	October 28, 2020	4.16	0.7/4
365	4	"Olé, Olé!"	November 4, 2020	4.03	0.7/4
366	5	"You Don’t Strike Me as a Renaissance Man"	November 11, 2020 (Note: Episode 5 was originally scheduled to air on November 4, 2020 in a double episode with the previous episode, but was postponed to accommodate special coverage from CBS News regarding updated 2020 United States presidential election results.)	3.72	0.7/4
367	6	"I’m Not Even Walking, I’m Falling"	November 18, 2020 (Note: This episode was originally scheduled to air on November 11, 2020, but was postponed due to the preemption of the previous double episode on November 4.)	3.90	0.7/4
368	7	"Give Me a Beard Bump"	November 18, 2020	3.18	0.6/3
369	8	"Are You a Rickshaw?"	November 25, 2020 (Note: This episode was originally scheduled to air on November 18, 2020, but was postponed due to the preemption of the fifth episode. Instead it aired over a two hour period with the subsequent episode.)	4.20	0.6/3
370	9	"This is Not Payback, This is Karma"	November 25, 2020	3.80	0.6/3
371	10	"Getting Down to the Nitty Gritty"	December 2, 2020	4.15	0.7/3
372	11	"Run on Your Tippy Toes"	December 9, 2020	4.15	0.7/4
373	12	"Now It's About Winning"	December 16, 2020	4.46	0.8/4

=== Season 33 (2022) ===
No. overall	No. in season	Title	Original release date	U.S. viewers (millions)	Rating/share (18–49)
374	1	"We're Back!"	January 5, 2022	4.40	0.7
375	2	"It Can't Be That Easy"	January 5, 2022	4.40	0.7
376	3	"Who Has This One in the Bag?"	January 12, 2022	3.49	0.5
377	4	"Ready to Restart the Race"	January 19, 2022	3.66	0.7
378	5	"Stairway to Hell"	January 26, 2022	3.93	0.6
379	6	"Say Cheese"	February 2, 2022	3.76	0.6
380	7	"Gently Down the Stream"	February 9, 2022	2.97	0.6
381	8	"Souvlaki"	February 16, 2022	3.17	0.5
382	9	"Rock Bottom"	February 23, 2022	3.28	0.5
383	10	"No Room for Error"	March 2, 2022	3.97	0.7
384	11	"In the Hands of the Amazing Race Gods"	March 2, 2022	3.97	0.7

=== Season 34 (2022) ===
No. overall	No. in season	Title	Original release date	U.S. viewers (millions)	Rating/share (18–49)
385	1	"Many Firsts But Don't Be Last"	September 21, 2022	3.03	0.5
386	2	"Patience Is the New Me"	September 28, 2022	2.55	0.4
387	3	"It's All in the Details"	October 5, 2022	2.38	0.3
388	4	"Everyone's an Artist"	October 12, 2022	2.42	0.3
389	5	"The Amazing Race of Arabia"	October 19, 2022	2.33	0.3
390	6	"Step by Step"	October 26, 2022	2.44	0.3
391	7	"It's Simply Medieval"	November 2, 2022	2.80	0.4
392	8	"La Ville Rose"	November 9, 2022	2.88	0.4
393	9	"Vamos a la Playa"	November 16, 2022	3.22	0.4
394	10	"Don't Look Down"	November 23, 2022	3.19	0.4
395	11	"How Am I Going to Survive This?"	November 30, 2022	3.15	0.4
396	12	"The Only Leg That Matters"	December 7, 2022	3.67	0.5

=== Season 35 (2023) ===
No. overall	No. in season	Title	Original release date	U.S. viewers (millions)	Rating/share (18–49)
397	1	"The Amazing Race Is Back!"	September 27, 2023	2.70	0.4
398	2	"You Don't See That at Home"	October 4, 2023	2.82	0.4
399	3	"No Sleep and a Million Dollar Dream"	October 11, 2023	2.87	0.4
400	4	"The Day Keeps Rockin' Here in Vietnam"	October 18, 2023	2.91	0.4
401	5	"Yessir, the Pink City"	October 25, 2023	2.83	0.4
402	6	"Driving Head on Into Scooters"	November 1, 2023	2.60	0.3
403	7	"Like Two Cats Fighting in a Car"	November 8, 2023	2.62	0.4
404	8	"A Planes, Trains and Automobiles Day"	November 15, 2023	3.03	0.4
405	9	"In the Belly of the Earth"	November 22, 2023	3.01	0.4
406	10	"Everyone Loves a Comeback Story"	November 29, 2023	3.01	0.4
407	11	"We're Finding Our Pot of Gold"	December 6, 2023	2.84	0.4
408	12	"A Sunset, Seattle Scramble"	December 13, 2023	3.31	0.4

=== Season 36 (2024) ===
No. overall	No. in season	Title	Original release date	U.S. viewers (millions)	Rating/share (18–49)
409	1	"You Can't Drive While You're Crying"	March 13, 2024	2.89	0.4/5
410	2	"Trust But Verify"	March 20, 2024	2.67	0.4/5
411	3	"It's Not Over Til Phil Sings"	March 27, 2024	2.79	0.4/4
412	4	"Those Who Wander Are Not Lost"	April 3, 2024	2.72	0.4/4
413	5	"Save The Stress For Later"	April 10, 2024	2.81	0.3/4
414	6	"Our Alliance Strikes Again"	April 17, 2024	2.78	0.4/4
415	7	"Walk and Chew Gum Baby"	April 24, 2024	2.83	0.3/4
416	8	"That's What Being Strong Will Do"	May 1, 2024	2.73	0.4/5
417	9	"My Precious Cacao"	May 8, 2024	2.84	0.4/4
418	10	"The Longest Minute of Your Life"	May 15, 2024	2.86	0.4/5

=== Season 37 (2025) ===
No. overall	No. in season	Title	Original release date	U.S. viewers (millions)	Rating/share (18–49)
419	1	"Double the Stakes, Double the Eliminations"	March 5, 2025	2.62	0.3/5
420	2	"Very Strong Warrior Energy"	March 12, 2025	2.56	0.3/5
421	3	"Chaotic, Crazy, That's What We're Used To"	March 19, 2025	2.67	0.4/6
422	4	"There's No Addresses in the Jungle"	March 26, 2025	2.48	0.3/4
423	5	"It's Not Personal, It's Business"	April 2, 2025	2.53	0.3/5
424	6	"It Smells Like the Desert"	April 9, 2025	2.65	0.4/5
425	7	"Be One With the Hay"	April 16, 2025	2.59	0.3/4
426	8	"We're Letting Race Brain Win"	April 23, 2025	2.44	0.3/4
427	9	"The Pizza de Résistance"	April 30, 2025	2.68	0.3/4
428	10	"Up the River Without a Joust"	May 7, 2025	2.57	0.3/4
429	11	"My Knight in Shining Armor"	May 14, 2025	2.51	0.3/4
430	12	"We're in Miami Baby!"	May 15, 2025	2.81	0.3/4

=== Season 38: European Adventure (2025) ===
No. overall	No. in season	Title	Original release date	U.S. viewers (millions)	Rating/share (18–49)
431	1	"Two Worlds Colliding"	September 25, 2025	2.03	0.2
432	2	"Mom's Gonna Have the Willies"	October 1, 2025	2.27	0.3
433	3	"Cry and Rally"	October 8, 2025	2.34	0.3
434	4	"What Would Houdini Do?"	October 15, 2025	2.39	0.3
435	5	"I Wanna Be a Little Angry Right Now"	October 22, 2025	2.31	0.3
436	6	"The System Hacked Me"	October 29, 2025	2.46	0.3
437	7	"It Feels Like Falling the Whole Time"	November 5, 2025	2.37	0.2
438	8	"Oh Egg, Where Art Thou"	November 12, 2025	2.30	0.2
439	9	"I'm Not a Big Fan of Olives"	November 19, 2025	N/A	TBA
440	10	"It's Hard Not to Feel Hopeless"	November 26, 2025	N/A	TBA
441	11	"The Can't Can't"	December 3, 2025	N/A	TBA
442	12	"One Million Cookies"	December 10, 2025	N/A	TBA

=== Season 39 (2026) ===
No. overall	No. in season	Title	Original release date	U.S. viewers (millions)	Rating/share (18–49)
443	1	"Sorry Guys, We Used Our Express Pass"	September 30, 2026	2.83	0.4/6
444	2	"Are Tomatoes Good for Skin Care?"	October 1, 2026	2.11	0.3/4
445	3	"This Is Sick and Twisted"	October 7, 2026	2.50	0.3/4
446	4	"Deception and Sleight of Hand"	October 14, 2026	2.59	0.4/6
447	5	"That's Honestly on Them"	October 21, 2026	2.65	0.4/6
448	6	"A Fine Line Between Confidence and Stupidity"	October 28, 2026	2.43	0.3/4
449	7	"The Amazing Nightmare"	November 4, 2026	TBD	TBA
450	8	"Million Dollar Moves"	November 11, 2026	TBD	TBA
451	9	"A Double-Edged Sword with an Alliance"	November 18, 2026	TBD	TBA
452	10	"We're Not Their Friends"	November 25, 2026	TBD	TBA
453	11	"Woman of My Word"	December 2, 2026	TBD	TBA
454	12	"Trust Yourself, Trust Your Confidence"	December 9, 2026	TBD	TBA

== Ratings ==
The Amazing Race (American TV series) (Part 1) : U.S. viewers per episode (millions)

Season	Episode number												
Season	1	2	3	4	5	6	7	8	9	10	11	12	13
1	11.83	10.02	8.62	8.70	8.28	8.37	9.17	8.40	9.44	8.24	9.48	9.39	13.65
2	8.95	12.50	13.29	9.73	10.09	8.97	8.85	9.56	8.80	9.95	11.25	–	
3	9.49	8.04	9.16	8.05	7.73	8.04	7.80	9.94	8.99	9.39	11.00	–	
4	9.94	8.27	8.13	7.59	7.86	6.93	8.05	7.78	8.60	8.13	8.35	8.70	9.88
5	10.30	10.50	11.10	10.05	10.55	10.39	8.73	10.49	9.98	10.85	10.30	12.85	–
6	11.79	11.46	11.84	11.72	10.73	10.72	10.14	10.66	11.07	10.61	12.30	12.01	12.62
7	11.76	11.69	12.71	12.43	13.18	12.28	5.16	12.97	12.34	13.27	12.84	16.01	–
8	10.64	11.25	10.95	11.11	10.38	10.89	10.84	10.30	8.80	11.16	11.51	–	
9	10.40	9.46	9.67	9.40	9.20	8.15	7.54	8.75	8.55	7.70	8.41	8.99	–
10	10.13	10.57	11.75	10.15	11.65	10.89	11.66	11.38	10.90	12.40	12.40	10.60	12.73
11	10.29	8.17	10.77	9.82	12.00	10.59	8.95	8.95	9.29	9.04	8.69	9.43	10.31
12	13.82	10.48	11.86	11.80	11.26	11.95	8.97	9.69	11.99	11.65	9.75	–	
13	10.04	11.00	9.01	12.29	9.70	9.72	11.71	12.13	9.87	11.83	10.50	–	
14	9.20	7.81	10.60	10.13	10.33	12.42	11.99	10.57	10.31	10.27	10.84	10.49	–
15	10.40	9.80	10.52	10.62	11.22	11.22	11.62	11.39	12.19	11.61	12.30	–	
16	9.00	9.01	10.21	8.11	10.10	11.99	12.73	9.12	11.88	10.65	10.29	10.58	–
17	11.54	10.67	11.99	10.94	11.42	9.09	11.01	10.34	10.59	11.57	10.34	12.12	–
18	9.15	7.68	9.78	9.44	10.13	10.96	10.48	8.78	9.37	9.20	8.97	–	
19	10.18	10.87	9.62	9.21	9.60	11.01	9.73	10.27	10.24	10.15	9.59	11.72	–
20	10.34	7.71	10.30	9.65	9.54	9.35	9.18	9.12	9.14	8.60	9.40	–	
21	9.40	9.66	9.11	9.54	9.41	10.20	9.18	9.59	9.58	10.02	9.35	–	
22	9.57	6.95	9.24	9.27	8.91	9.33	9.24	9.76	9.16	9.32	9.10	–	
23	8.62	9.74	8.08	8.87	8.11	9.38	9.12	9.12	7.97	10.29	9.21	–	
24	6.71	6.10	8.46	8.30	8.70	9.51	8.83	7.65	8.45	8.09	7.37	8.22	–
25	5.48	6.08	5.89	6.57	5.51	5.89	6.05	5.95	5.42	6.22	5.99	6.59	–
26	6.16	6.15	6.07	6.29	6.05	6.05	5.54	5.54	5.75	5.52	5.48	5.72	–
27	5.82	5.98	5.92	5.92	5.94	6.07	5.83	5.68	6.03	5.53	5.75	6.16	–
28	6.09	5.82	5.69	5.79	5.45	5.83	5.51	5.47	5.43	5.44	5.19	5.93	–
29	4.30	3.99	4.18	4.40	3.84	3.80	4.01	4.04	4.42	3.86	3.63	3.92	–
30	7.33	6.98	6.89	6.17	6.54	5.07	4.12	4.34	–				
31	5.74	4.65	4.50	4.44	4.50	3.70	4.74	4.67	4.66	4.75	3.82	–	
32	3.58	3.30	4.16	4.03	3.72	3.90	3.18	4.20	3.80	4.15	4.15	4.46	–
33	4.40	4.40	3.49	3.66	3.93	3.76	2.97	3.17	3.28	3.97	3.97	–	
34	3.03	2.55	2.38	2.42	2.33	2.44	2.80	2.88	3.22	3.19	3.15	3.67	–
35	2.70	2.82	2.87	2.91	2.83	2.60	2.62	3.03	3.01	3.01	2.84	3.31	–
36	2.89	2.67	2.79	2.72	2.81	2.78	2.83	2.73	2.84	2.86	–		
37	2.62	2.56	2.67	2.48	2.53	2.65	2.59	2.44	2.68	2.57	2.51	2.81	–
38	2.03	2.27	2.34	2.39	2.31	2.46	2.37	2.30	TBD	TBD	TBD	TBD	–
39	2.83	2.11	2.50	–									
