= Tanners' Gate =

Tanners' Gate (or Gate of the Tannery or Gate of the Tanneries) may refer to:

- Bab ad-Debbagh, Marrakesh, Morocco
- Tanners' Gate, Jerusalem: one of the Old City gates
