= The Amazing Race 25 =

Season of television series

- Season 25
- Region 1 DVD cover
- Presented by: Phil Keoghan
- No. of teams: 11
- Winners: Amy DeJong & Maya Warren
- No. of legs: 12
- Distance traveled: 26,000 mi (42,000 km)
- No. of episodes: 12

Release
- Original network: CBS
- Original release: September 26 – December 19, 2014

Additional information
- Filming dates: May 31 – June 22, 2014

Series chronology
- ← Previous; Season 24 Next → Season 26

The Amazing Race 25 is the twenty-fifth season of the American reality competition show The Amazing Race. Hosted by Phil Keoghan, it featured eleven teams of two, each with a pre-existing relationship, competing in a race around the world to win US$1,000,000. This season visited four continents and ten countries and traveled over 26,000 miles (42,000 km) during twelve legs. Starting in New York City, racers traveled through the U.S. Virgin Islands, England, Scotland, Denmark, Sweden, Morocco, Italy, Malta, Singapore, and the Philippines before returning to the United States and finishing in Greater Los Angeles. Elements introduced in this season include a public start; the Save, which was awarded to the winners of the first leg and would save them from elimination once; an Express Pass hidden on the racecourse; the Blind Detour, where teams learned about the task that they chose after arriving at its location; and four teams racing in the final leg. Elements of the show that returned for this season include the mid-leg elimination. The season premiered on CBS on September 26, 2014, and concluded on December 19, 2014.

Food scientists Amy DeJong and Maya Warren were the winners of this season, while married dentists Jim and Misti Raman finished in second place, and married surfers Adam Dirks and Bethany Hamilton finished in third place.

== Production ==
=== Development and filming ===
The 25th season of The Amazing Race started filming on May 31, 2014, at the red bleachers of Duffy Square at Times Square in New York City.

Filming began in the early morning of May 31, 2014, at Times Square in New York City. CBS invited fans to appear at the starting line to see the teams off. According to host Phil Keoghan, the show's production crew had sought to keep filming secret but included a public start this season due to the ubiquity of social media and fans' excitement. The publicity of the Times Square start led CBS to announce the identities of the competing teams the same day. It was revealed at the public start that instead of the Express Pass, teams would be awarded a new immunity from elimination pass called the Save for finishing first in the first leg. It could be used by that team if they were to finish last on any elimination leg before the ninth leg. The Save was presented once in a non-elimination leg so it was never used. Filming for this season ended in Los Angeles on June 22, 2014.

This season spanned 26,000 miles (42,000 km) and included first-time visits to the U.S. Virgin Islands, Malta, and the Shetland Islands of Scotland.

At various points throughout the filming of the season, teams encountered Phil Keoghan on the course where he explained a task to the home audience while the competition continued behind him.

For the first time in The Amazing Race history, four teams competed in the season's final leg. However, Phil eliminated one team in the middle of the final leg, leaving only three teams racing to the finish line.

== Contestants ==
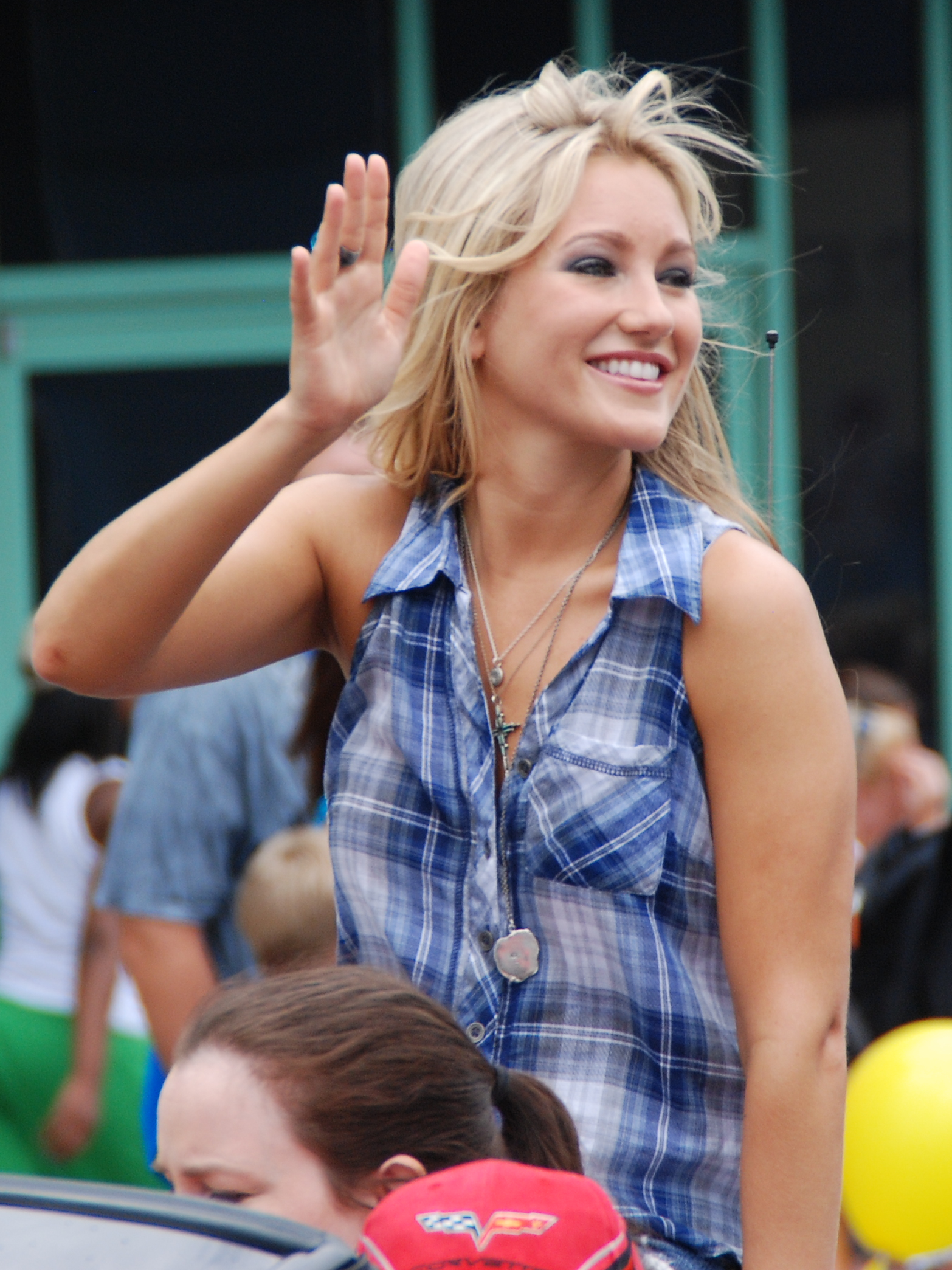
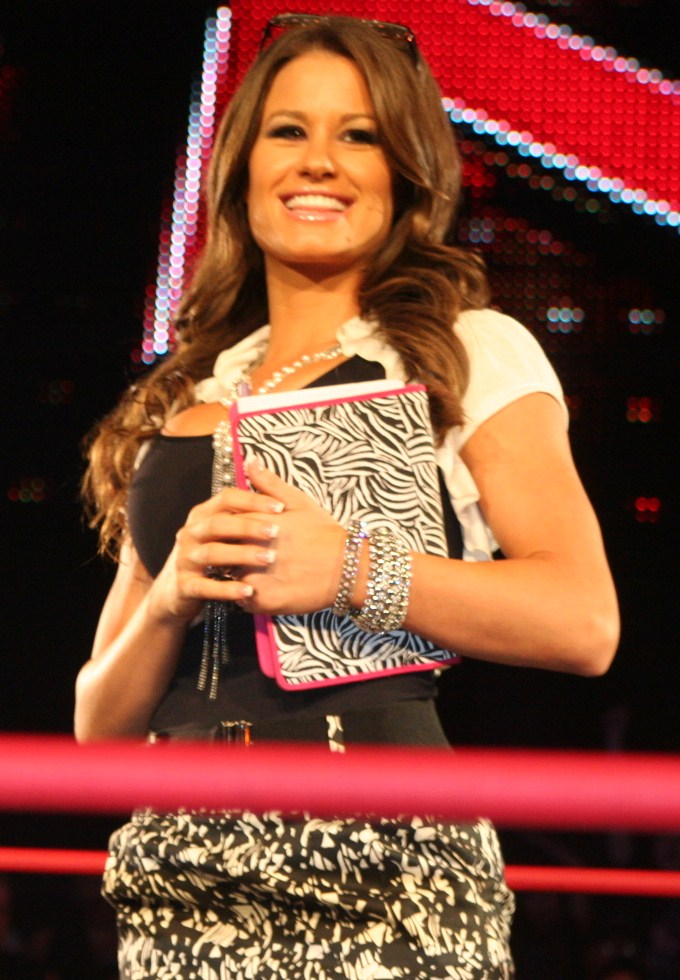
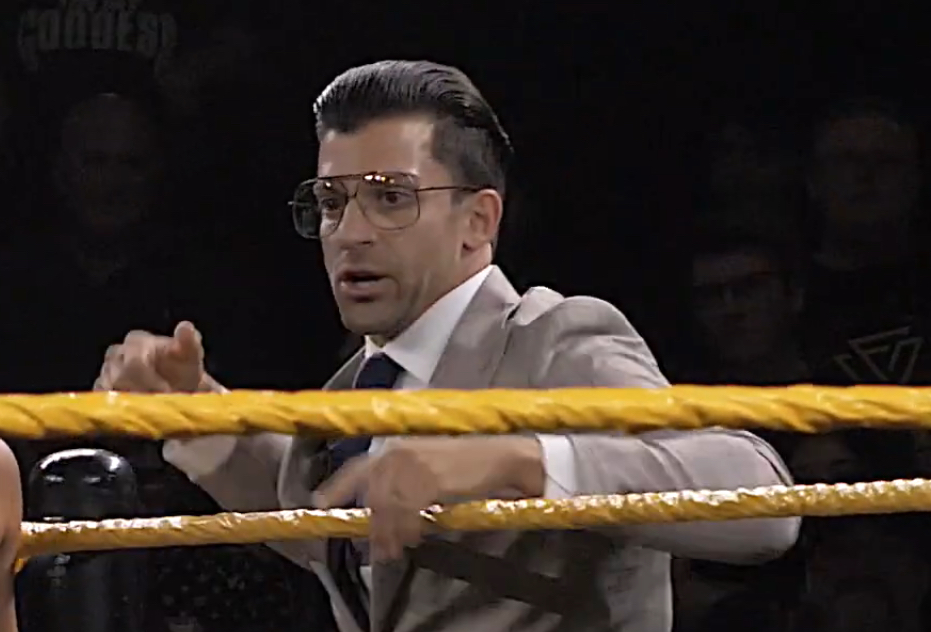
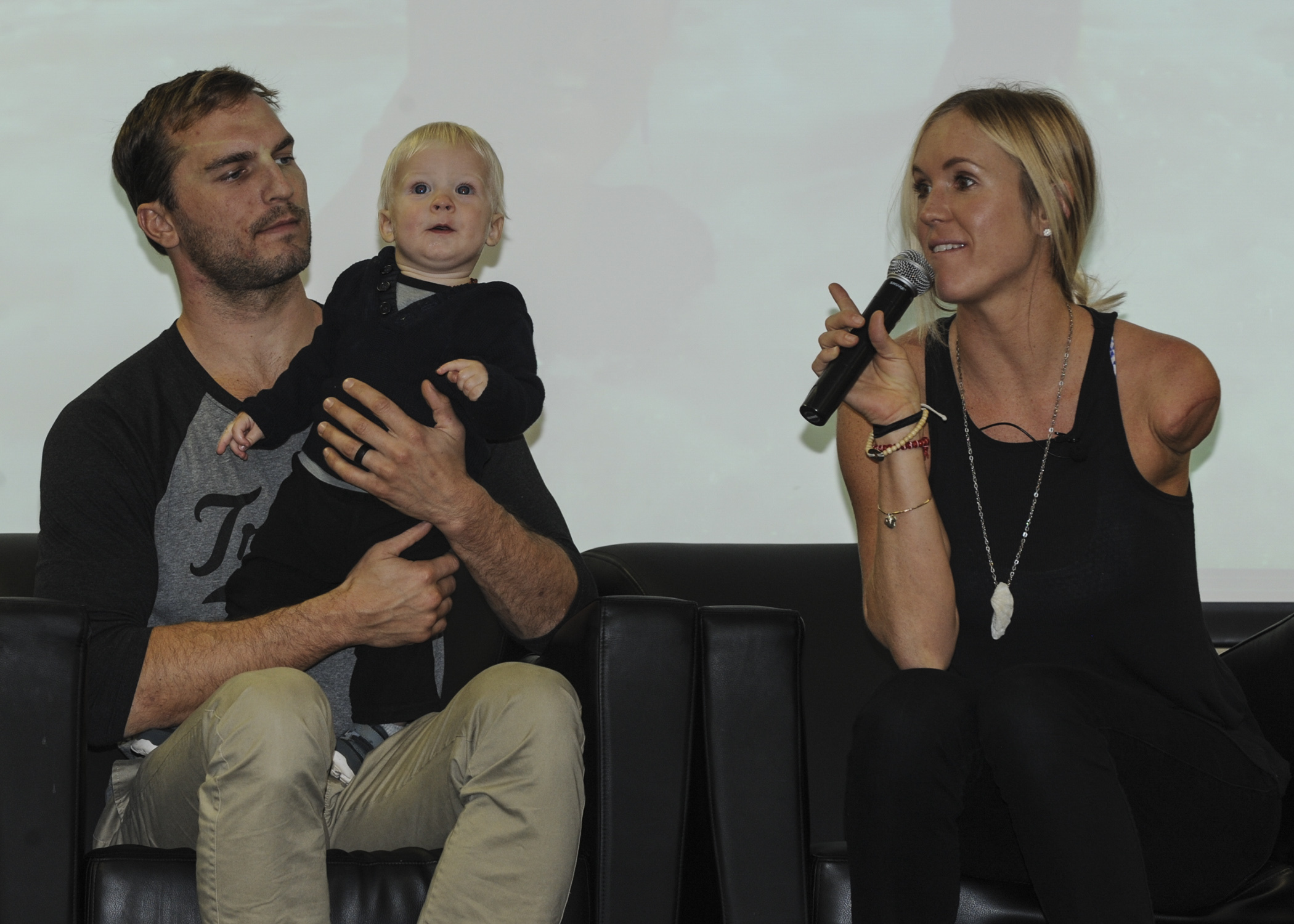
From left to right: Isabelle Du, Whitney Duncan, Brooke Tessmacher, Robbie Strauss, Adam Dirks, and Bethany Hamilton

The cast included married professional surfers Bethany Hamilton, a shark attack survivor whose story was told in her memoirs and the film Soul Surfer, and Adam Dirks; former Survivor: South Pacific contestants and engaged couple Whitney Duncan and Keith Tollefson; and TNA Wrestling stars Brooke Adams and Robbie Strauss.

Contestants	Age	Relationship	Hometown	Status
Lisa Thomson	28	Realtor Sisters (Miami Realtors)	Miami, Florida	Eliminated 1st (in Charlotte Amalie, U.S. Virgin Islands)
Michelle Thomson	22	Realtor Sisters (Miami Realtors)	Miami, Florida	Eliminated 1st (in Charlotte Amalie, U.S. Virgin Islands)
Dennis Hour	30	Newly Dating (The Dating Couple)	Tustin, California	Eliminated 2nd (in Woodstock, England)
Isabelle Du	28	Newly Dating (The Dating Couple)	Tustin, California	Eliminated 2nd (in Woodstock, England)
Michael Ward	40	Firefighters (The Firefighters)	Boston, Massachusetts	Eliminated 3rd (on St Ninian's Isle, Scotland)
Scott Strazzullo	39	Firefighters (The Firefighters)	Boston, Massachusetts	Eliminated 3rd (on St Ninian's Isle, Scotland)
Keith Tollefson	29	Engaged (Team Nashville)	Nashville, Tennessee	Eliminated 4th (in Marrakesh, Morocco)
Whitney Duncan	29	Engaged (Team Nashville)	Nashville, Tennessee	Eliminated 4th (in Marrakesh, Morocco)
Shelley Porter	42	Mother & Daughter (Mom/Daughter)	Detroit, Michigan	Eliminated 5th (in Hajar, Morocco)
Nici Porter	24	Mother & Daughter (Mom/Daughter)	Detroit, Michigan	Eliminated 5th (in Hajar, Morocco)
Tim Tsao	23	College Sweethearts (College Sweethearts)	Pasadena, California	Eliminated 6th (in Gżira, Malta)
Te Jay McGrath	24	College Sweethearts (College Sweethearts)	Pasadena, California	Eliminated 6th (in Gżira, Malta)
Kym Perfetto	34	Urban Bike Racers (The Cyclists)	Brooklyn, New York	Eliminated 7th (in Singapore)
Alli Forsythe	26	Urban Bike Racers (The Cyclists)	Brooklyn, New York	Eliminated 7th (in Singapore)
Brooke Adams	29	Dating Pro Wrestlers (The Wrestlers)	Houston, Texas	Eliminated 8th (in Los Angeles, California)
Robbie Strauss	30	Dating Pro Wrestlers (The Wrestlers)	Woodbridge, New Jersey	Eliminated 8th (in Los Angeles, California)
Adam Dirks	26	Married Surfers (Soul Surfers)	Princeville, Hawaii	Third place
Bethany Hamilton	24	Married Surfers (Soul Surfers)	Princeville, Hawaii	Third place
Misti Raman	36	Married Dentists (The Dentists)	Columbia, South Carolina	Runners-up
Jim Raman	37	Married Dentists (The Dentists)	Columbia, South Carolina	Runners-up
Amy DeJong	24	Food Scientists (Sweet Scientists)	Madison, Wisconsin	Winners
Maya Warren	29	Food Scientists (Sweet Scientists)	Madison, Wisconsin	Winners

Future appearances

In 2017, Brooke Adams appeared on the second season of the TLC reality show Rattled. In 2019, Robbie Strauss competed on the second episode of The Titan Games. In 2024, Bethany Hamilton competed on the twelfth season of The Masked Singer as "Macaron".

== Results ==
The following teams are listed with their placements in each leg. Placements are listed in finishing order.

- A red placement with a dagger (†) indicates that the team was eliminated.
- An underlined blue placement with a double-dagger (‡) indicates that the team was the last to arrive at a Pit Stop in a non-elimination leg, and had to perform a Speed Bump task in the following leg.
- An italicized and underlined placement indicates that the team was the last to arrive at a Pit Stop, but there was no rest period at the Pit Stop and all teams were instructed to continue racing. There was no required Speed Bump task in the next leg.
- A green ƒ indicates that the team won the Fast Forward.
- A purple ε indicates that the team used an Express Pass on that leg to bypass one of their tasks.
- A brown ⊃ indicates that the team used the U-Turn and a brown ⊂ indicates the team on the receiving end of the U-Turn.

Team placement (by leg)
Team	1	2	3	4	5	6	7	8	9	10	11	12
Amy & Maya	6th	8th	5th	4th	7th	6th	3rd	4th	4th	2nd	4th (Note: This team arrived last at the Pit Stop, but they were instructed to continue racing.)	1st
Misti & Jim	1st	2nd	1st	8th‡	6th	1st	1st	2nd	3rd	1st	3rd	2nd
Adam & Bethany	5th	1st	2nd	7th	2nd	2nd	5th	1stε (Note: Adam & Bethany used their Express Pass to bypass the Detour on this leg.)	1stƒ (Note: This team won the Fast Forward on this leg.)	3rd	2nd	3rd
Brooke & Robbie	4th	7th	6th	2nd	5th	5th	4th	5th	2nd	4th‡	1st	4th† (Note: Brooke & Robbie were last to arrive at the Southwest Marine Warehouse and were eliminated in the middle part of the final leg.)
Kym & Alli	3rd	3rd	7th	1st	1st	3rd	2nd	3rd	5th†			
Tim & Te Jay	2nd	5th	8th	5th	3rd	4th	6th‡	6th†				
Shelley & Nici	8th	9th	4th	6th	4th⊃ (Note: Shelley & Nici chose to use the U-Turn on Keith & Whitney.)	7th†						
Keith & Whitney	9th	4th	3rd	3rd	8th†⊂							
Michael & Scott	10th	6th	9th†									
Dennis & Isabelle	7th	10th†										
Lisa & Michelle	11th†											

== Race summary ==
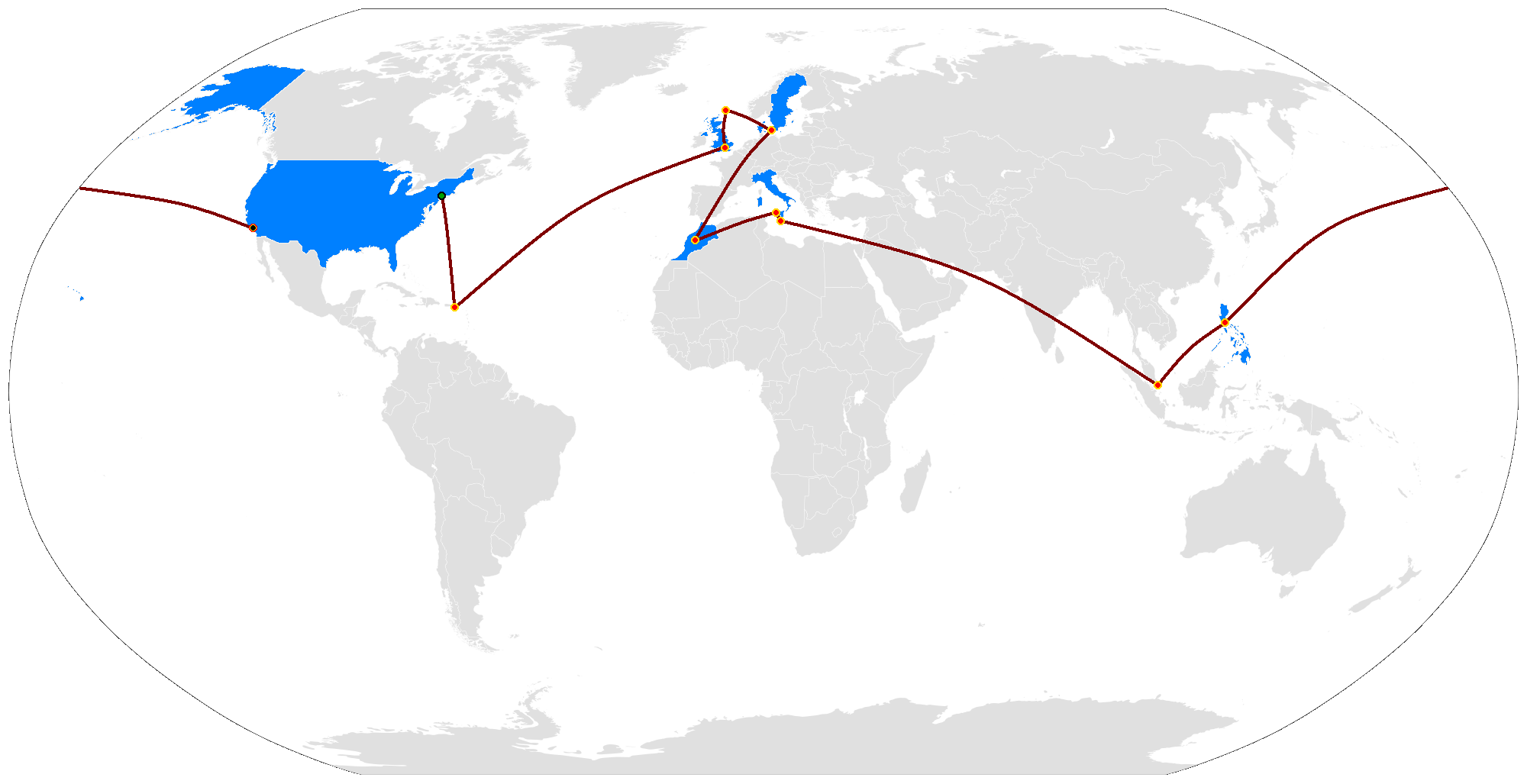
The route of The Amazing Race 25.

Destinations	Air travel Rail travel Water travel Bus travel Helicopter travel Bicycle travel Gondola travel
Route Markers	Detour Roadblock Fast Forward Express Pass; U-Turn Speed Bump Pit Stop

=== Leg 1 (United States → U.S. Virgin Islands) ===
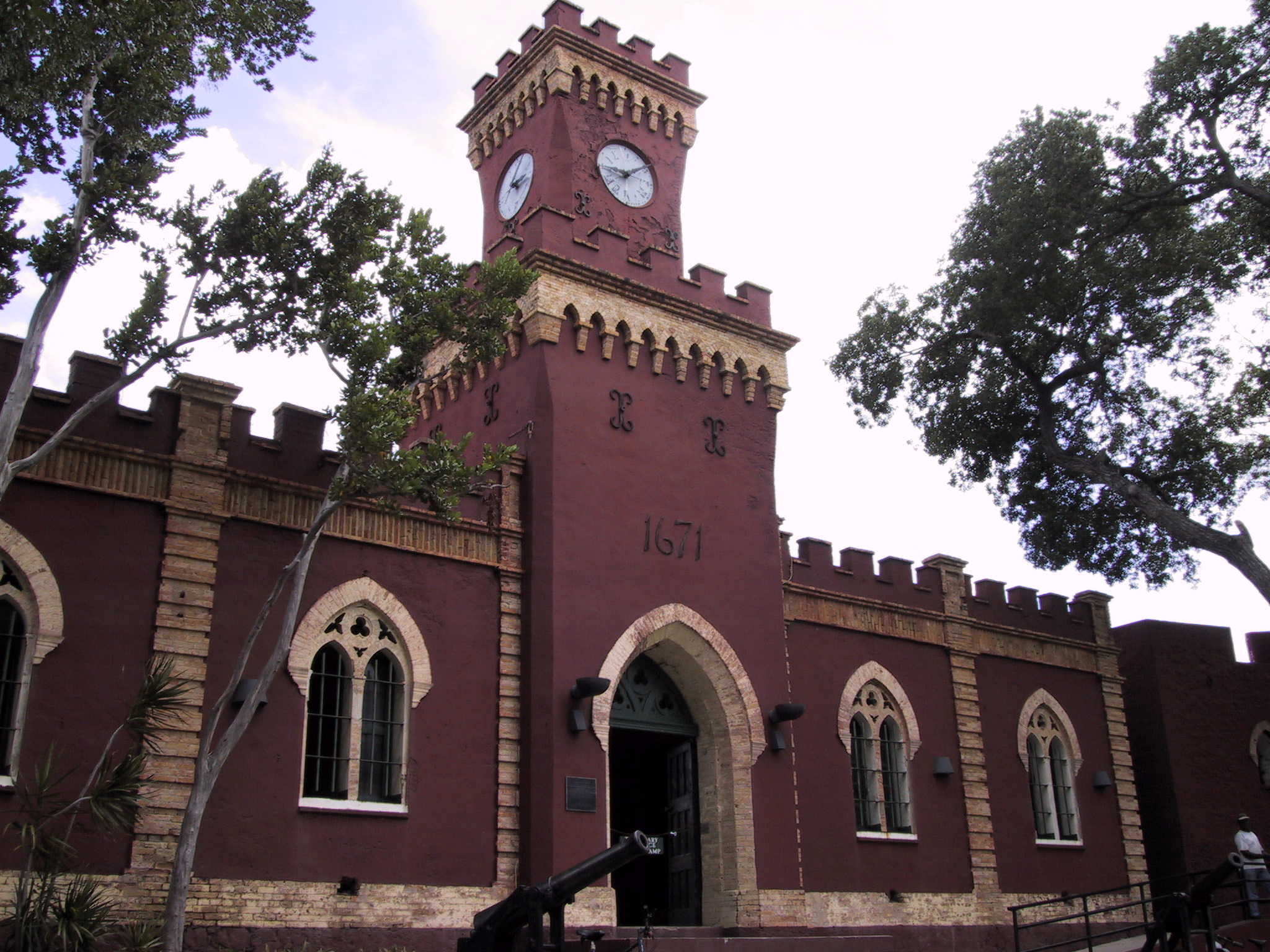
Fort Christian on Saint Thomas in the U.S. Virgin Islands served as the Pit Stop for the first leg of The Amazing Race 25.

- Episode 1: "Go Big or Go Home" (September 26, 2014)
- Prize: The Save (awarded to Misti & Jim)
- Eliminated: Lisa & Michelle

Locations

- New York City, New York (Times Square – Duffy Square) (Starting Line)
- New York City (Flushing Meadows–Corona Park – Unisphere)
- New York City → Charlotte Amalie, U.S. Virgin Islands
- Charlotte Amalie (Vendor's Plaza)
- Charlotte Amalie (Charlotte Amalie Harbor Seaplane Base) → Saint John (Lovango Cay)
- Saint John (Lovango Cay → Carval Rock)
- Saint John (Carval Rock) → Hans Lollik Island (Blackbeard's Revenge)
- Hans Lollik Island (Beach)
- Hans Lollik Island (Beach) → Enighed (Magens Bay)
- Charlotte Amalie (Fort Christian)

Episode summary

- At Duffy Square, teams were told to travel to the location of the finish line from the first season of The Amazing Race, which they had to figure out was the Unisphere at Flushing Meadows–Corona Park. There, they found their next clue, which instructed them to book one of two flight to the island of Saint Thomas in the U.S. Virgin Islands. (Note: Five teams were on the first flight from John F. Kennedy International Airport, while the remaining six teams departed forty minutes later.) Once there, teams had to travel to Vendor's Plaza in Charlotte Amalie and sign up for one of six chartered seaplane flights to Lovango Cay.
- After landing on Lovango Cay, teams found their next clue, which instructed them to travel by boat to Carval Rock and climb up and along its length. At the end of the islet, teams jumped into the Caribbean Sea and then swam to a series of floating bottles that held their next clue. Teams then traveled by boat to Hans Lollik Island, where they boarded Blackbeard's Revenge. Teams were greeted by a Blackbeard impersonator, who gave them their next clue directing them to pull themselves to shore in a rowboat.
- In this season's first Roadblock, one team member had to start from one of four landmarks on the beach and use a traditional liquid compass and a unique set of directions to search the beach for a treasure chest buried in the sand that held their next clue.
- After the Roadblock, teams had to return by boat to Saint Thomas and then check in at the Pit Stop: Fort Christian in Charlotte Amalie.

Additional notes

- Frank Mesa, who had competed in season 1, appeared at the starting line, where he directed teams to the Unisphere when they asked the audience for help in finding the location of their next clue.
- Keith, Scott, and Lisa chose to quit the Roadblock. Keith & Whitney and Michael & Scott were issued four-hour penalties that were applied at the start of the next leg, while Lisa & Michelle were the last team to arrive and were therefore eliminated.

=== Leg 2 (U.S. Virgin Islands → England) ===
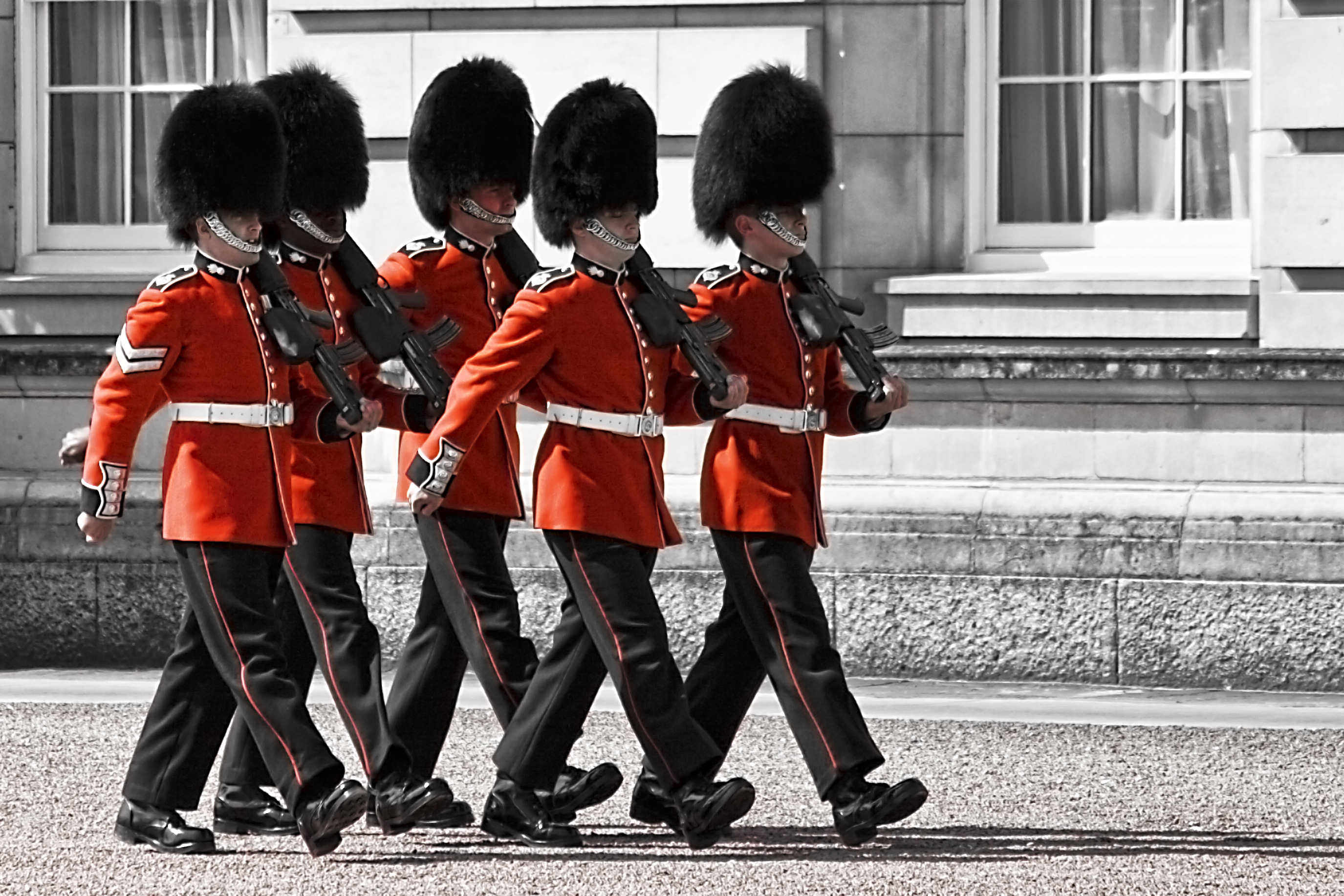
One of the Detour choices in London had teams dress in Queen's Guard uniforms and participate in a Changing of the Guard ceremony.

- Episode 2: "When You Gotta Go, You Gotta Go" (October 3, 2014)
- Prize: A trip for two to Jukkasjärvi, Sweden (awarded to Adam & Bethany)
- Eliminated: Dennis & Isabelle

Locations

- Charlotte Amalie (Fort Christian)
- Charlotte Amalie → London, England
- London (Tower Bridge)
- London (Somerset House or Victoria Tower Gardens)
- London → Oxford
- Oxford (Magdalen Bridge – Boathouse)
- Oxford (Christ Church College – Tom Quad)
- Oxford (Bear Inn)
- Woodstock (Blenheim Palace)

Episode summary

- At the start of this leg, teams were instructed to fly to London, England. (Note: There were only two available flights with limited seats from Charlotte Amalie to London, so the first six teams to check in at the airport left before the remaining four teams.) Once there, teams had to travel to Tower Bridge and find the Pearly King and Queen, who gave them their next clue.
- This season's first Detour was a choice between About Face or Pancake Race. In About Face, teams traveled to Somerset House, where they dressed as members of the Queen's Guard and had to perform the Changing of the Guard ceremony to the satisfaction of the parade commander before receiving their next clue. In Pancake Race, teams traveled to the Victoria Tower Gardens to participate in a Parliamentary Pancake Race. Racers had to dress as a chef, cook a pancake, and then complete one lap around the course while constantly flipping their pancakes within 75 seconds before receiving their next clue. If racers dropped a pancake, ran out of time, or did not flip the pancakes enough, they had to start over.
- After the Detour, teams had to travel by train to Oxford and find their next clue at the boathouse beneath the Magdalen Bridge. There, teams had to punt themselves along the River Cherwell around Magdalen College Island before receiving their next clue. Teams then traveled to Christ Church College, where each racer received a bowler hat and an umbrella that they had to bring to the Pit Stop. Their previous clue had informed them to tip their bowlers, which revealed "Churchill's Birthplace" printed on the inside, which they had to figure out was Blenheim Palace.
- The clue also instructed teams to open their umbrellas for a chance at finding the Express Pass by searching for the oldest pub in Oxford – the Bear Inn – rather than heading directly to the Pit Stop. Adam & Bethany obtained the Express Pass.

=== Leg 3 (England → Scotland) ===
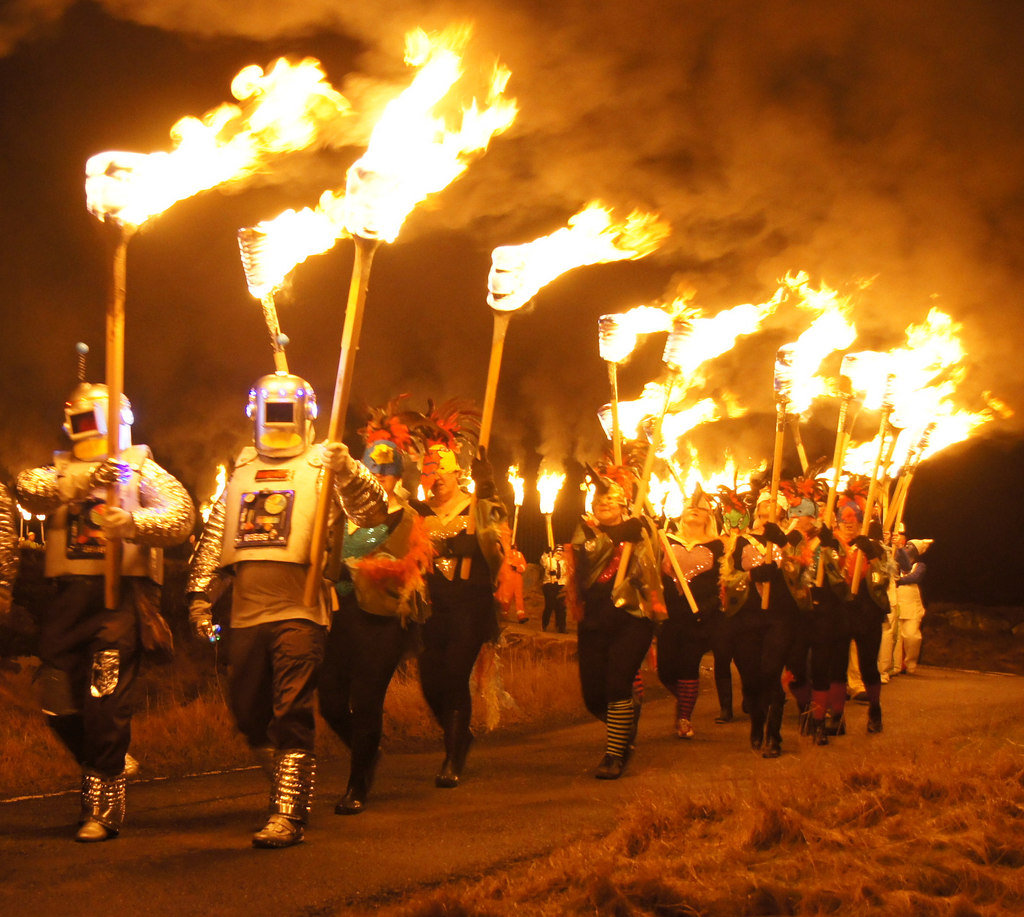
One of the Detour choices in the Shetland Islands had some teams participated in the Scottish fire festivals of Up Helly Aa.

- Episode 3: "Get Your Sheep Together" (October 10, 2014)
- Prize: A trip for two to Dubai, United Arab Emirates (awarded to Misti & Jim)
- Eliminated: Michael & Scott

Locations

- Oxford (Walton Street – Oxford University Press)
- Oxford → Aberdeen, Scotland
- Aberdeen (Union Square Parking Area)
- Aberdeen → Lerwick
- Lerwick (Royal National Lifeboat Station)
- Scalloway (Scalloway Castle)
- Scalloway (Peats of Scalloway) or Lerwick (DITT Store, Up Helly Aa Galley Shed & Hay's Dock)
- Scalloway (Berry Farm)
- St Ninian's Isle (Tombolo)

Episode summary

- At the start of this leg, teams were instructed to travel by train to Aberdeen, Scotland, drive to the ferry terminal, and then travel by ferry to the Shetland Islands. After docking, teams had to drive to the Royal National Lifeboat Station and search for a puffin mascot, who gave them their next clue. Teams then drove to Scalloway Castle, where they had to search the castle grounds for a knight and a Scottish Deerhound guarding a room that held their next clue.
- This leg's Detour was a choice between Pony Up or Light My Fire. In Pony Up, teams drove to the Peats of Scalloway, where they had to cut fifty blocks of peat from a peat bank. They then had to load up a Shetland pony with two loads of peat and deliver them uphill to a farmer, who gave them their next clue. In Light My Fire, teams had to build a viking torch for Up Helly Aa. Once finished, teams drove to Hay's Dock, where they presented the torch to the guizer jarl, who lit their torch and gave them their next clue.
- After the Detour, teams had to drive to Berry Farm and find their next clue, which instructed them to shepherd a flock of sheep through a series of gates and into a pen. Once finished, the shepherd gave teams a Celtic brooch and instructed them to travel to where it was originally found. Teams had to figure out that the brooch was part of an 8th-century treasure horde from St Ninian's Isle, which was the Pit Stop.

=== Leg 4 (Scotland → Denmark & Sweden) ===
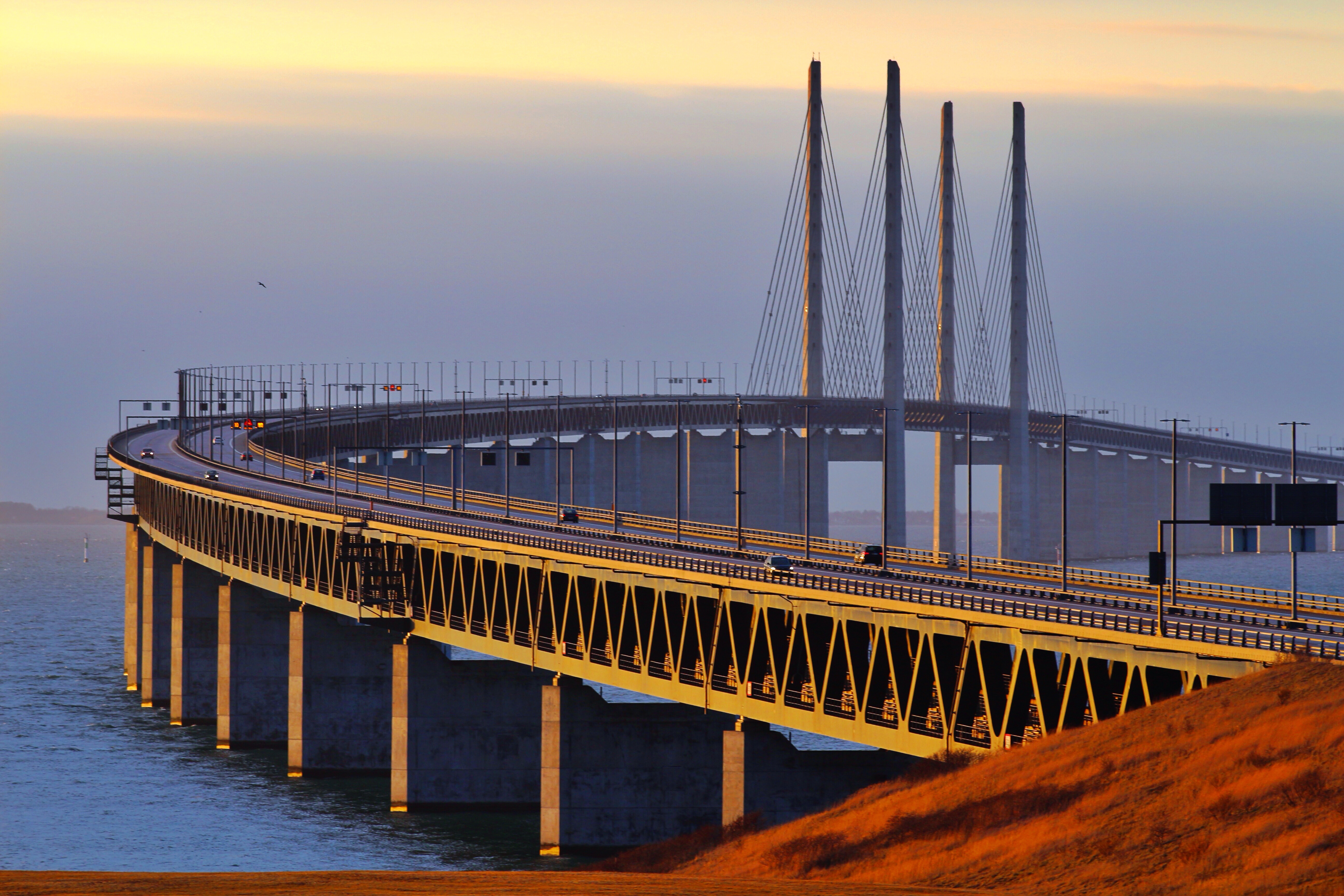
After arriving in Copenhagen, teams drove to Malmö, Sweden, by crossing the Øresund Bridge, before returning to Denmark for the rest of the leg.

- Episode 4: "Thinly Sliced Anchovies" (October 17, 2014)
- Prize: A Ford C-Max Hybrid for each team member (awarded to Kym & Alli)

Locations

- St Ninian's Isle (Tombolo)
- Lerwick → Aberdeen
- Aberdeen → Copenhagen, Denmark (Copenhagen Airport)
- Malmö, Sweden (Stortorget)
- Copenhagen, Denmark (Sankt Jørgens Allé or Det Franske Conditori Bakery & Allegade 10 Restaurant)
- Copenhagen (Ida Davidsen)
- Copenhagen (VM Houses)

Episode summary

- At the start of this leg, teams had to return by ferry to Aberdeen and then fly to Copenhagen, Denmark. Once there, teams had to search the airport for a marked car with their next clue, which instructed them to drive across the Øresund Bridge to Malmö, Sweden. If teams used less than 0.10 US gallons (0.38 L) of gasoline, they were automatically given their next clue. If teams used more than 0.10 US gallons (0.38 L), they had to answer a Scandinavian geography question before receiving their next clue.
- This leg's Detour was a choice between Parking Space or Wedding Cake. In Parking Space, teams drove to Sankt Jørgens Allé, where they had to set up one of two types of parklets in a parking spot within 30 minutes so that it matched a photograph before receiving their next clue. If the time expired before they were finished, teams had to move to a new parking space and start over. In Wedding Cake, teams drove to the Det Franske Conditori bakery, where they had to put together a traditional wedding cake known as a kransekage. They then had to transport the cake across town using a cargo bike to the Allegade 10 restaurant, receive a signature from the maître d', and return the receipt to the head baker in exchange for their next clue.
- After the Detour, teams had to drive to Ida Davidsen, which had their next clue.
- In this leg's Roadblock, one team member had to take a smørrebrød (sandwich) order from two restaurant patrons, remembering the menu number of the two sandwiches that they had each ordered, and then use a menu to memorize the contents of the four sandwiches. They had to relay the order and if they were correct, they had to deliver the sandwiches to the customers, who gave them their next clue directing them to the Pit Stop: the VM Houses.

Additional note

- This was a non-elimination leg.

=== Leg 5 (Denmark → Morocco) ===
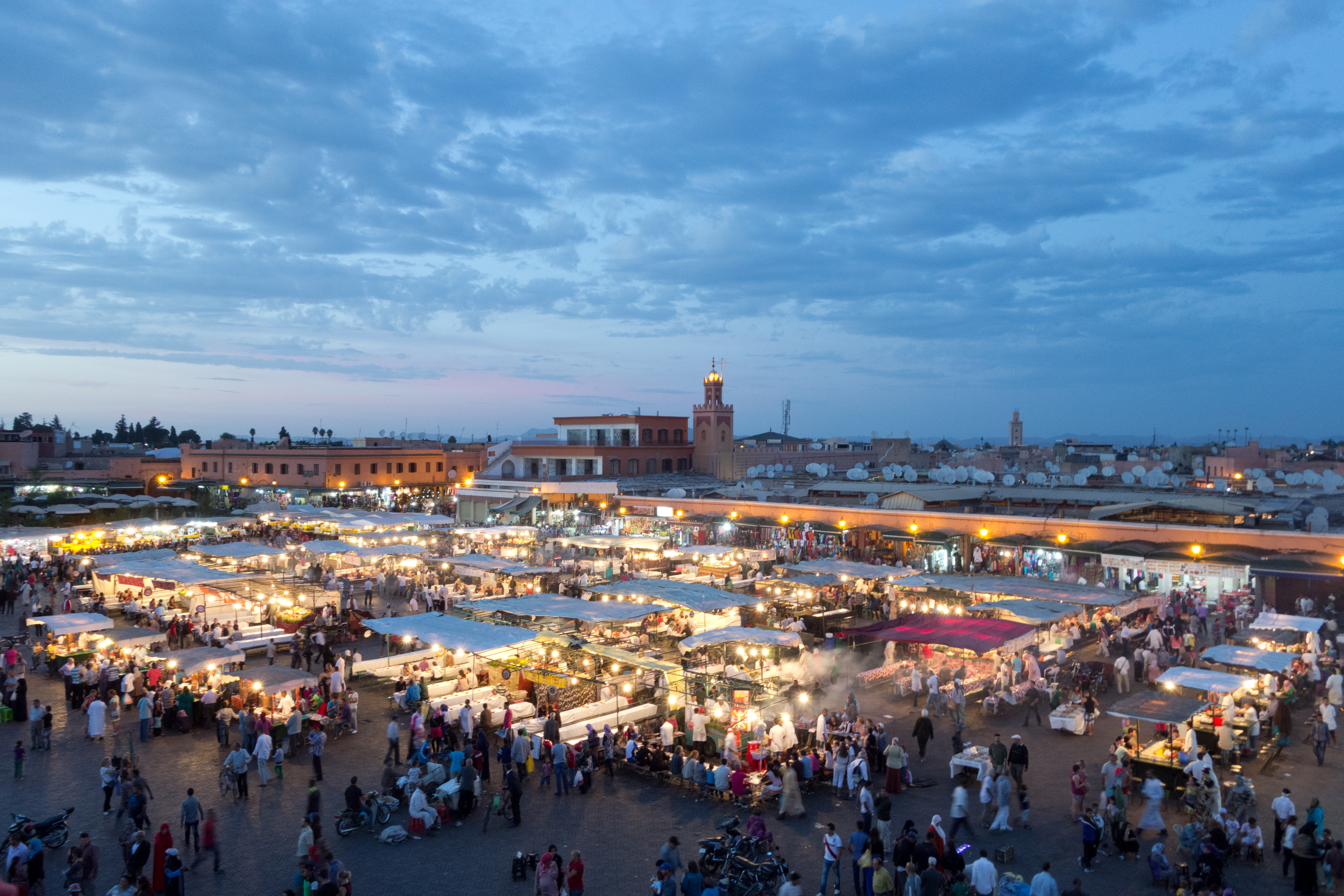
While in Marrakesh, most of the tasks centered around the city's Jemaa el-Fnaa marketplace.

- Episode 5: "Morocc'and Roll" (October 24, 2014)
- Prize: US$5,000 for each team member (awarded to Kym & Alli)
- Eliminated: Keith & Whitney

Locations

- Copenhagen (VM Houses)
- Copenhagen → Marrakesh, Morocco
- Marrakesh (Jemaa el-Fnaa)
- Marrakesh (Le Cadeau Berbère & Riad Monceau)
- Marrakesh (Bab Debbagh Tannery)
- Marrakesh (Ben Youssef Madrasa)
- Marrakesh (Bob Magic Music & Jemaa el-Fnaa or Le Paradis du Thée & Palais Gharnata)
- Marrakesh (Le Grand Balcon du Café Glacier)
- Marrakesh (Al Matjar Carpet Shop)

Episode summary

- At the start of this leg, teams were instructed to fly to Marrakesh, Morocco. Once there, teams had to travel to Jemaa el-Fnaa, find the food cart garage, bring a cart to the marketplace, and set up the cart to the satisfaction of the cart owner before receiving their next clue, which directed them to the Bab Debbagh Tannery.
- In this leg's Roadblock, one team member had to collect three unfinished goat skins and remove the remaining hairs from the skins. They then had to load three bundles of finished hides onto a bike and deliver them to a nearby cobbler. After getting a receipt, they had to return to the tannery and trade it for their next clue.
- For their Speed Bump, Misti & Jim had to travel to Le Cadeau Berbère, pick up ten Moroccan rugs, and then hang the rugs on a wall outside the Riad Monceau hotel so as to prepare them for sale before they could continue racing.
- After the Roadblock, teams had to travel to the Ben Youssef Madrasa, where they found their next clue.
- This leg's Detour was a choice between Twirl Time or Tea Time. In Twirl Time, teams had to pick up their Gnawa music costumes and instruments and receive instruction on how to play them. While one team member played a drum to keep a rhythm, the other had to play the krakebs while using their head to continuously twirl a tassel on their hat for one minute before receiving their next clue. In Tea Time, teams had collect a Moroccan mint tea set before traveling to the Palais Gharnata, where they donned costumes and observed how to properly serve the tea. While one team member held the serving tray with one hand, the other had to ceremonially pour the tea into two cups at once before receiving their next clue.
- After the Detour, teams had to travel on foot to the Café Glacier and find their next clue, which directed them to the Pit Stop: the Al Matjar Carpet Shop.

Additional note

- Shelley & Nici chose to use the U-Turn on Keith & Whitney. In an unaired scene, Keith & Whitney chose to use the U-Turn on Amy & Maya; however, they had already passed the U-Turn and were therefore unaffected.

=== Leg 6 (Morocco) ===
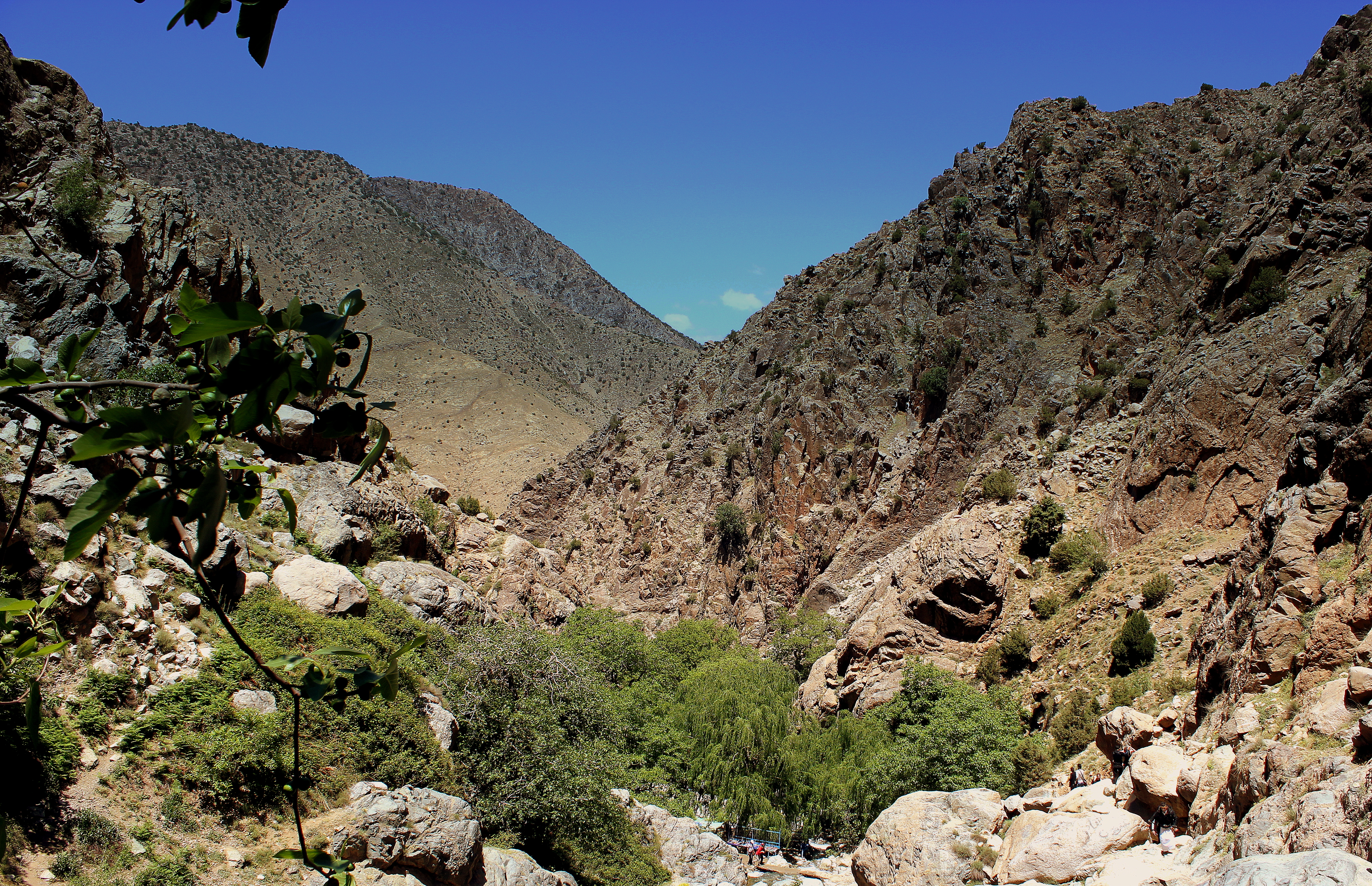
During the Roadblock, racers zip-lined across the Moroccan canyons of the Atlas Mountains in Tahannaout.

- Episode 6: "I Feel Like I Just Kissed a Goat" (October 31, 2014)
- Prize: A trip for two to Iguaçu Falls in Brazil (awarded to Misti & Jim)
- Eliminated: Shelley & Nici

Locations

- Marrakesh (Al Matjar Carpet Shop)
- Marrakesh (El Massi)
- Marrakesh (Koutoubia Mosque)
- Amizmiz (Abdessadek Boufoulouss Pottery Stand)
- Oumnass (Oumnasse Casbah)
- Tahannaout (Terres d'Amanar)
- Hajar (Casbah d'If)

Episode summary

- At the start of this leg, teams were instructed to search for a feed station at El Massi, pick up two bags of hay, and then deliver them to a horse stable across town. They then picked a horse-drawn carriage that took them back into the center of Marrakesh and had to feed their horses an apple before they were given their next clue. Then, from the Koutoubia Mosque, teams had to drive to the Abdessadek Boufoulouss pottery stand in Amizmiz and search for their next clue hidden amongst the pots.
- This leg's Detour was a choice between Camp or Cream. In Camp, teams had to set up a traditional Berber tent to the satisfaction of the judge before receiving their next clue. In Cream, teams had to milk a goat so as to fill a pail. They then had to use a goat skin to churn the goat milk until they made at least three ounces (85 g) of butter before receiving their next clue.
- After the Detour, teams had to drive to Terres d'Amanar in Tahannaout, which had their next clue.
- In this leg's Roadblock, one team member had to cross a series of rope-and-plank bridges and ziplines across a canyon in the Atlas Mountains. Once on the other side of the canyon, they had to put together a wooden puzzle. Once the puzzle was correct, they received their next clue and then joined their partner back on the other side of the canyon.
- After the Roadblock, teams received a photo depicting the Casbah d'If, which was the Pit Stop.

=== Leg 7 (Morocco → Italy) ===
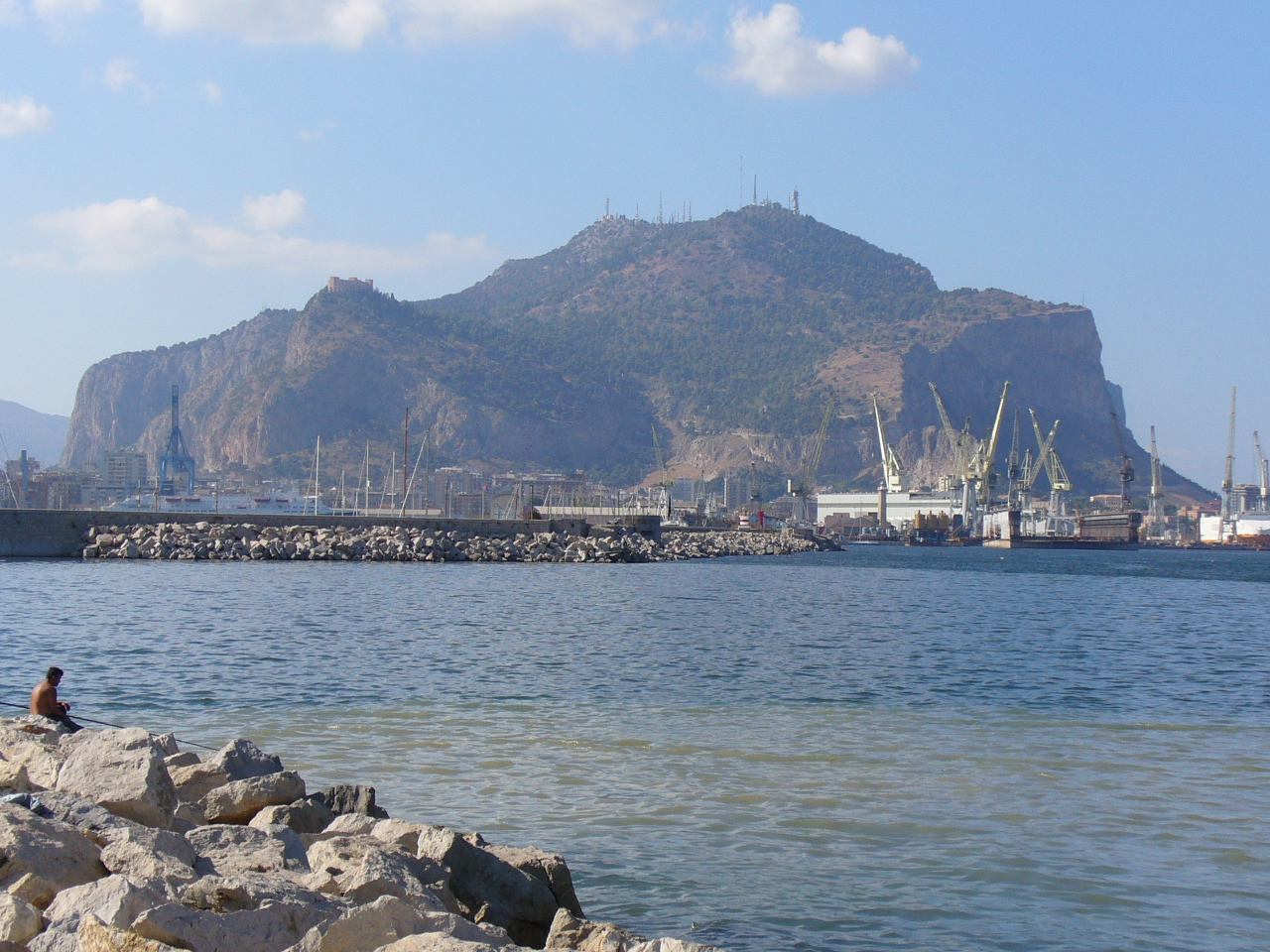
In Sicily, contestants raced around Mount Pellegrino, paying homage to Italy's racing history.

- Episode 7: "Pretty Fly For a Food Scientist" (November 7, 2014)
- Prize: A trip for two to Ocho Rios, Jamaica (awarded to Misti & Jim)

Locations

- Hajar (Casbah d'If)
- Marrakesh → Palermo, Italy
- Palermo (Teatro di Verdura)
- Palermo (Villa Costanza)
- Palermo (Mondello – Antico Stabilimento Balneare)
- Palermo (Tonnara Florio or Teatro Politeama Garibaldi)
- Palermo (Villa Niscemi)

Episode summary

- At the start of this leg, teams were instructed to fly to Palermo on the island of Sicily. Once there, teams found a series of tambourines marked with one of three departure times the next morning at the Teatro di Verdura. Teams then had to travel to Villa Costanza, which had their next clue.
- In this leg's Roadblock, one team member had to drive a go-kart along the old route of the Targa Florio around Mount Pellegrino within 4:07 minutes before receiving their next clue from Nino Vaccarella. If unsuccessful, they had to follow a pace car back to the starting line and try again. Once racers got their next clue, they were driven back down the mountain to reunite with their partner at Antico Stabilimento Balneare.
- This leg's Detour was a choice between Painters or Posers. In Painters, teams had to travel to the Tonnara Florio and restore a fresco while lying on their backs on a high scaffolding to the satisfaction of the restoration artist before receiving their next clue. In Posers, teams had to travel to the Teatro Politeama Garibaldi and watch a series of opera performers. They then had to go backstage, identify the costumes worn by the performers, and write down the characters' names and their operas in the order the performers appeared on stage in a playbook before receiving their next clue.
- After the Detour, teams had to check in at the Pit Stop: Villa Niscemi.

Additional notes

- Phil Keoghan announced that this was The Amazing Race's 300th leg.
- Palermo mayor Leoluca Orlando appeared as the Pit Stop greeter outside the mayoral headquarters at Villa Niscemi.
- This was a non-elimination leg.

=== Leg 8 (Italy → Malta) ===
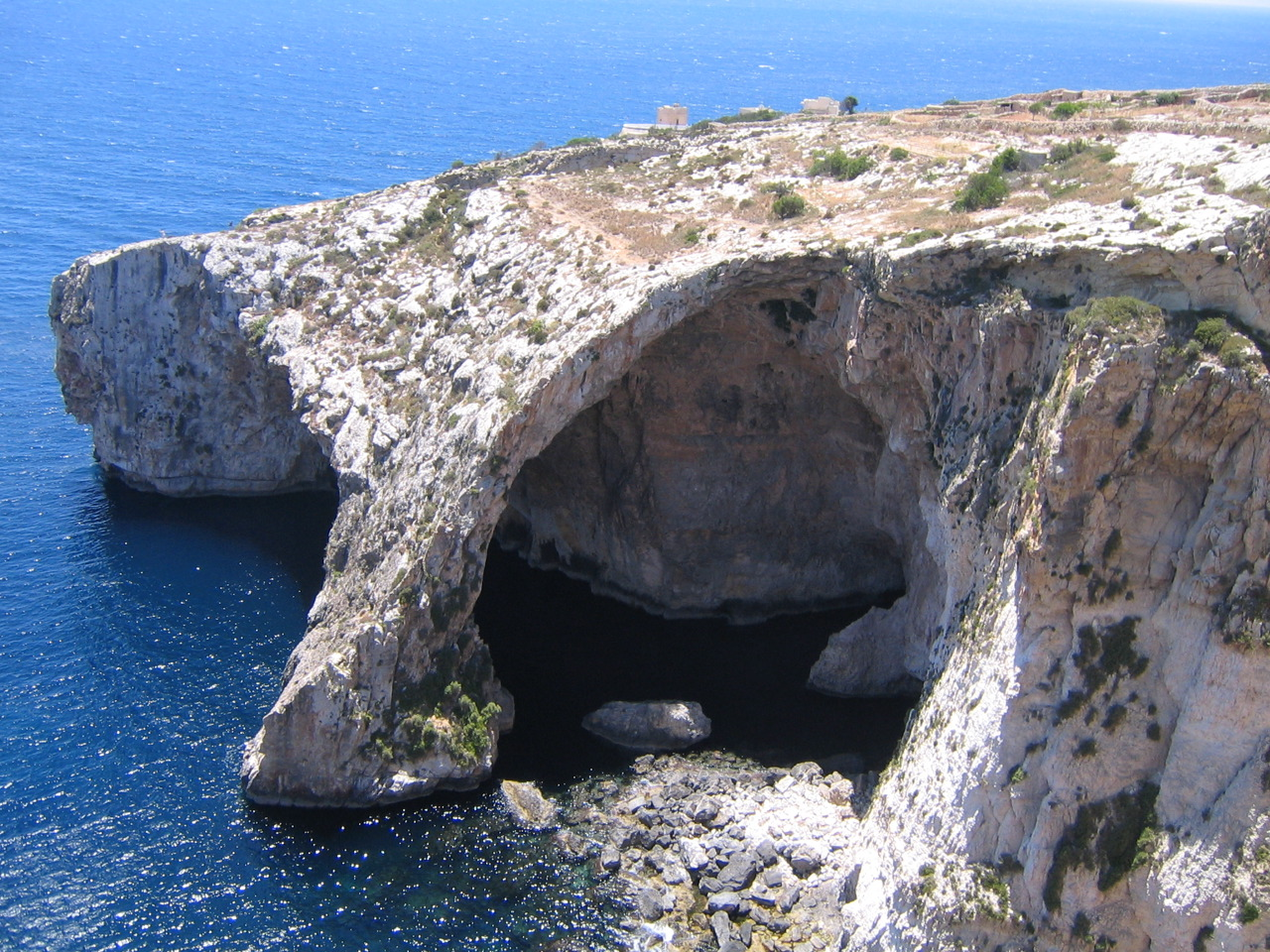
The Roadblock in Malta had racers descending into its Blue Grotto.

- Episode 8: "Hot Sexy Knights" (November 21, 2014)
- Prize: US$10,000 for each team member (awarded to Adam & Bethany)
- Eliminated: Tim & Te Jay

Locations

- Palermo (Villa Niscemi)
- Pozzallo → Valletta, Malta
- Valletta (Bridge Bar & Upper Barrakka Gardens)
- Qrendi (Żurrieq Valley Sea Inlet – Boathouse)
- Qrendi (Blue Grotto)
- Birgu (Church of St. Scholastica – Triq Antika)
- Birgu (Saint Lawrence's Church Oratory)
- Birgu (Birgu Harbour or Gate of Provence)
- Gżira (Manoel Island – Fort Manoel)

Episode summary

- At the start of this leg, teams were instructed to travel by ferry to Valletta, Malta. Once there, teams were given a drink order at the Bridge Bar and had to carry the order on a tray up Saint Ursula Street's staircase to a group of the Knights of Malta at the Upper Barrakka Gardens in exchange for receive their next clue. If racers dropped anything along the way, they had to clean up the mess before the bartender replaced their broken items. Teams were then directed to the boathouse at the Żurrieq Valley Sea Inlet, where they found a series of Maltese cross necklaces with departure times the next morning.
- In this leg's Roadblock, one team member had to rappel twenty stories down into the water of the Blue Grotto, swim into the cave, and retrieve their next clue. They then rejoined their partner in a waiting boat and were taken ashore.
- After the Roadblock, teams had to travel to the Church of St. Scholastica in Birgu, where they found their next clue.
- For their Speed Bump, Tim & Te Jay had to travel to the oratory of Saint Lawrence's Church and paint the Maltese cross onto two shields before they could continue racing.
- This season's first Blind Detour, where teams only learned about the task they chose once they arrived at its location, was a choice between Flag or Shine. In Flag, teams traveled to the Birgu Harbour and had to participate in a traditional Maltese game of ġostra, which involved both team members running up a greased log over the harbor and grabbing a flag before receiving their next clue. In Shine, teams traveled to the Gate of Provence, where both team members had to don a helmet and chest plate and polish each other's armor to the satisfaction of the knights before receiving their next clue. Adam & Bethany used their Express Pass to bypass this Detour.
- After the Detour, teams had to check in at the Pit Stop: Fort Manoel on Manoel Island.

=== Leg 9 (Malta → Singapore) ===
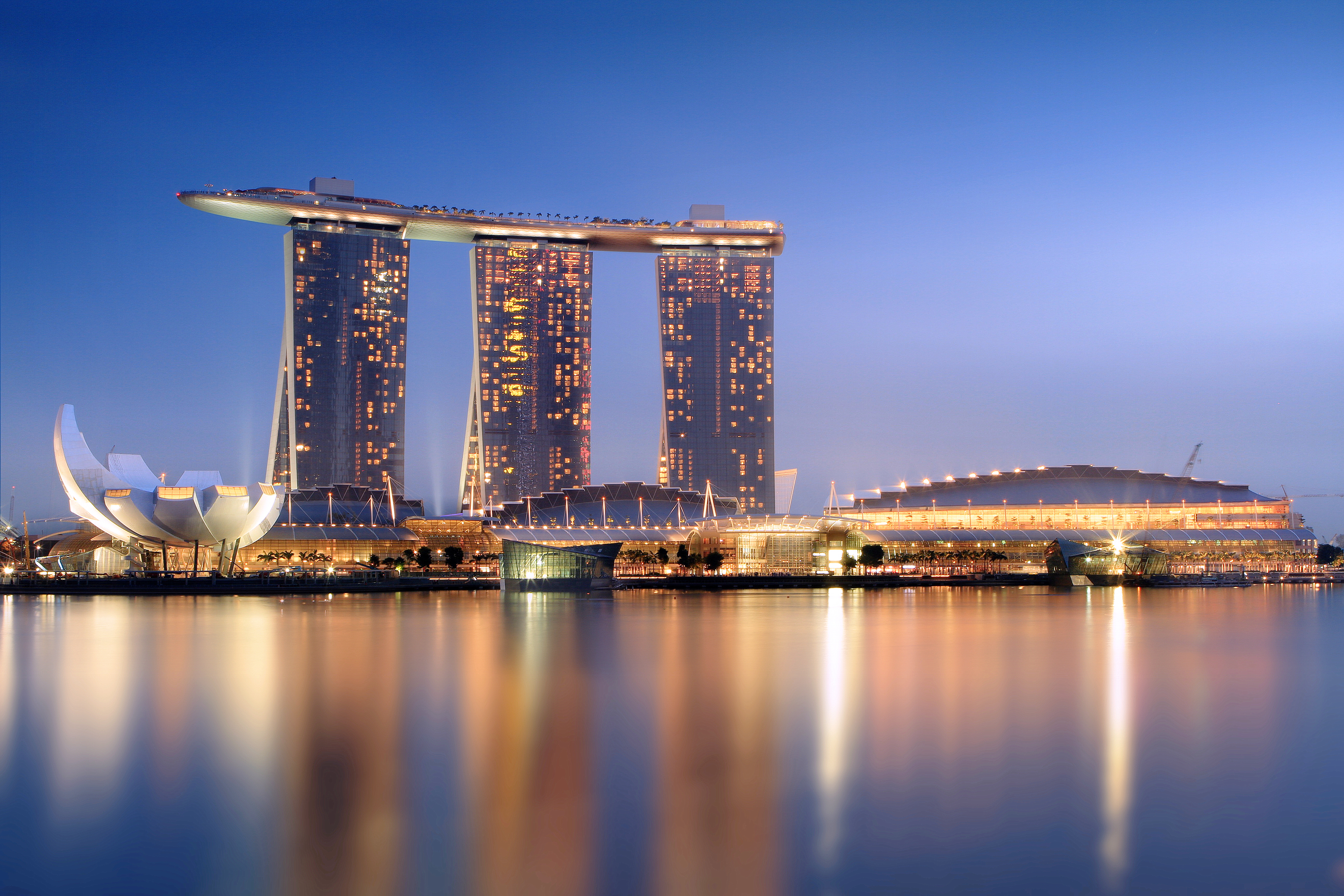
For the Roadblock in Singapore, one team member walked on a tightrope between the towers of the Marina Bay Sands.

- Episode 9: "You're Taking My Tan Off" (November 28, 2014)
- Prize: A trip for two to Bali, Indonesia (awarded to Adam & Bethany)
- Eliminated: Kym & Alli

Locations

- Valletta (City Gate)
- Valletta → Singapore
- Singapore (Changi Village & Pulau Ubin – Coconut Stand)
- Singapore (Sentosa – Wave House)
- Singapore (Marina Bay Sands)
- Singapore (Raffles Place – Centre Square)
- Singapore (Hong San See Temple or Robertson Quay – Red House)
- Singapore (Fort Canning Park)
- Singapore (Mount Faber – Merlion Statue)
- Singapore (The Fullerton Pavilion)

Episode summary

- At the start of this leg, teams were instructed to fly to Singapore. Once there, teams took a bumboat to Pulau Ubin, where they had to find a coconut stand and drink the coconut water before receiving their next clue.
- For this season's only Fast Forward, teams had to surf on an artificially-generated wave at Sentosa's Wave House for two minutes without falling. Adam & Bethany won the Fast Forward.
- Teams who chose to not attempt the Fast Forward had to travel to the observation deck of the Marina Bay Sands, which had their next clue.
- In this leg's Roadblock, one team member had to walk across a tightrope suspended 600 feet (180 m) above the ground from one tower of the Marina Bay Sands to a second, pick up their next clue, and then return to their partner at the original tower.
- After the Roadblock, teams had to travel to Centre Square at Raffles Place, where they had to find a man wearing a red-and-yellow "Onward Singapore" placard on his back with their next clue.
- This leg's Detour was a choice between China Cups or Chili Crabs. In China Cups, teams traveled to the Hong San See temple, where they had to undergo a deep tissue massage, skin exfoliation, and cupping therapy before receiving their next clue. In Chili Crabs, teams traveled to the Red House seafood restaurant, where they had to prepare chilli crab by cracking open crab claws smothered in hot chili sauce and collecting two pounds (0.91 kg) of crab meat before receiving their next clue.
- After the Detour, teams found their next clue at Fort Canning Park. There, they were instructed to find their next clue at one of the five official Merlion monuments throughout the city – two at Merlion Park, and one each at Sentosa, Tourism Court, and Mount Faber – the latter of which was the correct site. Teams then had to check in at the Pit Stop: The Fullerton Pavilion, overlooking Marina Bay.

Additional notes

- Teams were given tickets on a pre-arranged flight to Paris, France, but were under no obligation to use them.
- Amy & Maya chose to use the U-Turn on Adam & Bethany. However, Adam & Bethany had won the Fast Forward and were therefore unaffected.
- Melody Chen from The Amazing Race Asia 1 was the Pit Stop greeter on this leg.

=== Leg 10 (Singapore → Philippines) ===
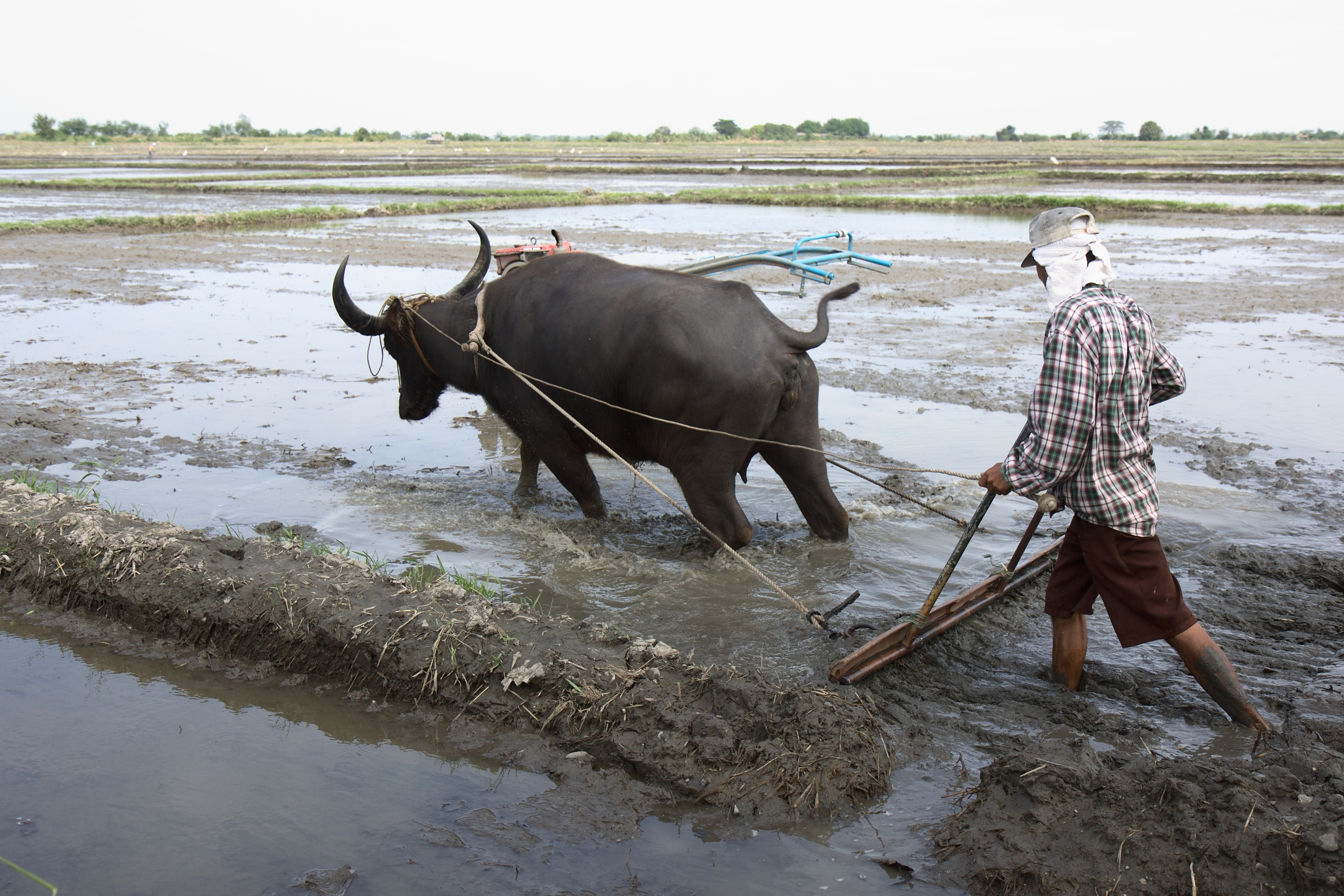
In the Philippines, teams participated in a Switchback of the infamous ox-plow task from season 5.

- Episode 10: "Smells Like Dirty Tube Socks" (December 5, 2014)
- Prize: A trip for two to Ninh Vân, Vietnam (awarded to Misti & Jim)

Locations

- Singapore (The Fullerton Pavilion)
- Singapore → Manila, Philippines
- Parañaque (Baclaran Church) → Rosario (Rosario Municipal Plaza – Salinas Specials)
- Rosario (Manila Bay – Rosario Fish Port or RGC Side Car and Welding Shop)
- Naic (Sitio Maname – Rice Fields)

Episode summary

- At the start of this leg, teams were instructed to fly to Manila, Philippines. Once there, teams had to pick up their clue from the flower vendor at Baclaran Church the next morning. This clue instructed teams to then travel by jeepney to Salinas Specials at Rosario Municipal Plaza, where they found their next clue.
- This leg's Detour was a choice between Catch or Coach. In Catch, teams had to wade into Manila Bay to a pump boat offshore. They then had to fill a bucket with fish and transport it back to shore until they filled three large buckets with 300 pounds (140 kg) of fish before receiving their next clue. In Coach, teams had to properly assemble and attach a side car onto a motorcycle using the provided tools, making sure to match the motorcycle to their provided side car, before receiving their next clue.
- After the Detour, teams had to travel to the rice fields in Naic, where they took part in a Switchback from season 5. Teams had to use a plow attached to a water buffalo to dredge up their next clue hidden within the mud of a rice paddy. Teams then had to search on foot for the nearby Pit Stop.

Additional note

- This was a non-elimination leg.

=== Leg 11 (Philippines) ===
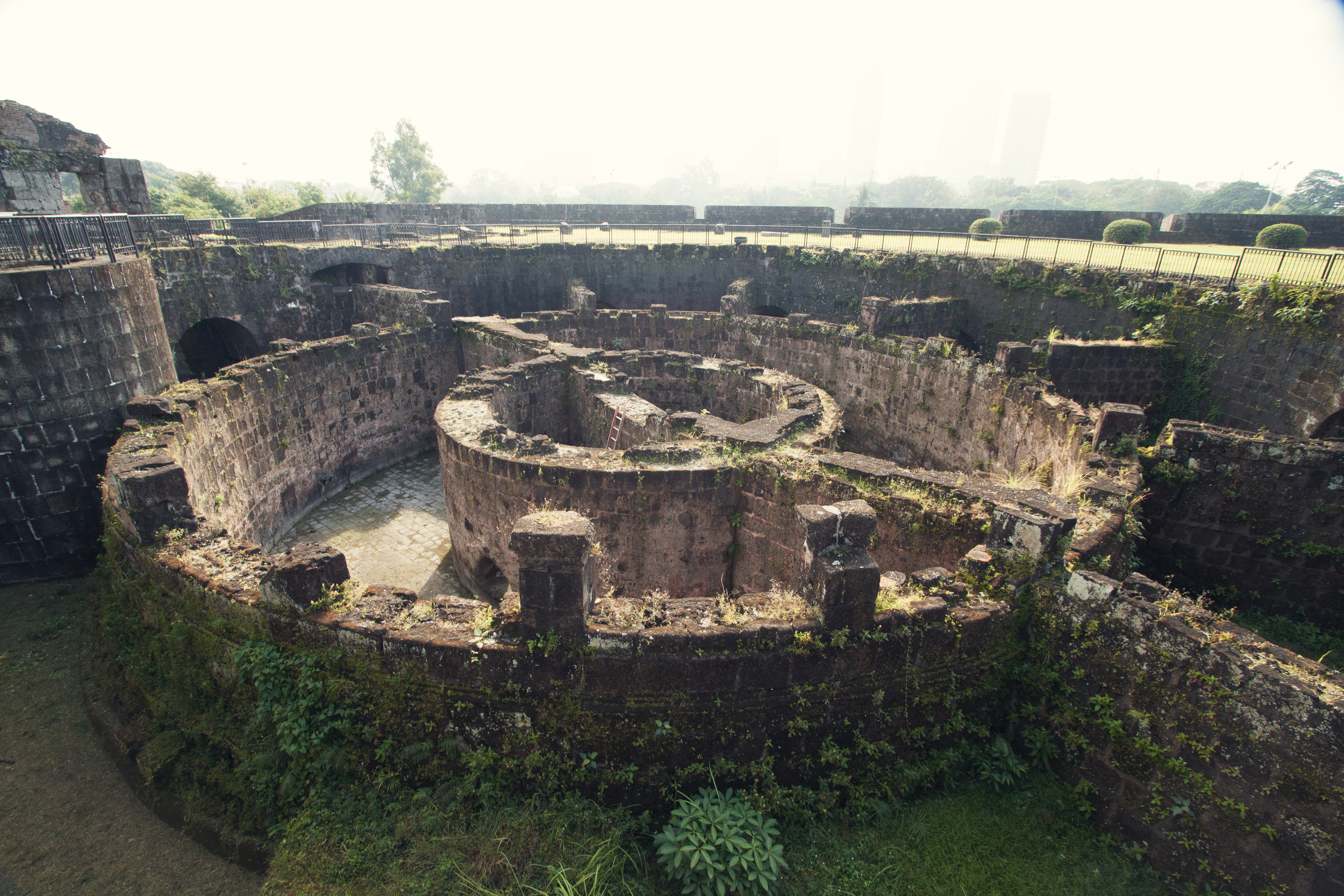
The Baluarte de San Diego in Manila's historic center of Intramuros was the Pit Stop on this leg.

- Episode 11: "Hooping It Up" (December 12, 2014)

Locations

- Bacoor (Molino Boulevard)
- Bacoor (Molino Boulevard) → Manila (Rajah Sulayman Park)
- Manila (Manila Baywalk)
- Manila (Malate Neighborhood)
- Manila (Divisoria Market)
- Manila (Intramuros – Baluarte de San Diego)

Episode summary

- At the start of this leg, teams had to travel by jeepney to Rajah Sulayman Park in Manila, which had their next clue.
- For their Speed Bump, Brooke & Robbie had to unload the items from a man's broken padyak and load them onto a second padyak before they could continue racing.
- This season's final Detour was also a Blind Detour and was a choice between This or That. In This, teams traveled on foot to the intersection of Bocobo and Malvar Streets, where they had to play street basketball against a neighborhood team and score 21 points before receiving their next clue. In That, teams traveled on foot to the intersection of Pedro Gil Street and Pilar Hidalgo Lim, where they had to race padyaks around a marked course for four laps with each teammate pedaling the bicycle for two laps each. If teams finished four laps of the course within 17:55 minutes, they would receive their next clue.
- After the Detour, teams had to travel to the intersection of Santo Cristo Street and San Nicolas Street within the Divisoria Market and find their next clue.
- In this leg's Roadblock, one team member had to deliver specified quantities of two coconut-based products – bunot (a coconut shell used to clean floors) and walis tingting (a broom made of palm fronds) – to three different addresses within the Divisoria Market, collect a receipt from each delivery, and then return all three receipts before receiving their next clue, which directed them to the Pit Stop: the Baluarte de San Diego in Intramuros.

Additional note

- There was no elimination at the end of this leg; all teams were instead instructed to continue racing.

=== Leg 12 (Philippines → United States) ===
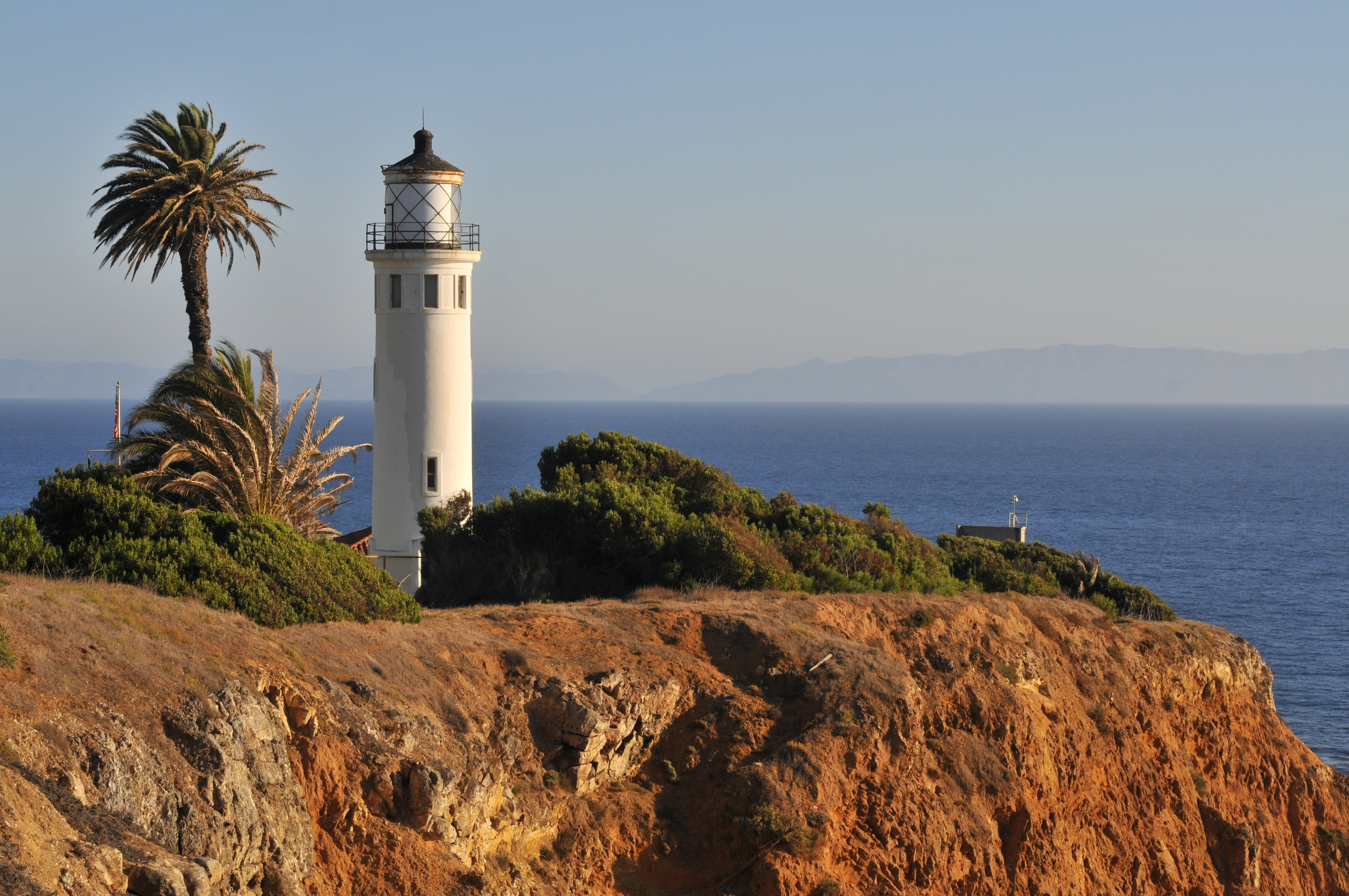
Point Vicente Lighthouse in Rancho Palos Verdes was the finish line of The Amazing Race 25.

- Episode 12: "All or Nothing" (December 19, 2014)
- Prize: US$1,000,000
- Winners: Amy & Maya
- Runners-up: Misti & Jim
- Third place: Adam & Bethany
- Eliminated (at the episode's midpoint): Brooke & Robbie

Locations

- Manila → Los Angeles, California (Los Angeles International Airport)
- Los Angeles (Downtown City Hall)
- Los Angeles (Terminal Island – Southwest Marine Warehouse) (Elimination Point)
- Los Angeles (Terminal Island – United States Coast Guard Base)
- Los Angeles (ConGlobal Industries)
- Rancho Palos Verdes (Point Vicente Lighthouse)

Episode summary

- At the start of this leg, Phil Keoghan gave teams a manila envelope along with their clue, which instructed them to travel to the "City of Angels": Los Angeles. At the airport, teams had to find a marked vehicle and use its voice control feature to listen to their next clue, which directed them to drive to Los Angeles City Hall. There, teams met the city's film clerk, who stamped the filming permit in their manila envelope and directed them to the Southwest Marine Warehouse, where they had to hand the permit to an assistant director in exchange for their next clue.
- In this leg's first Roadblock, one team member had to learn how to jump out of a third story window from a stunt coordinator. When ready, they had to pick up a satchel, jump through a window made of breakaway glass, and land safely on a pile of boxes below. Once completed, they could retrieve their next clue inside their satchel. Brooke & Robbie were the last team to arrive at this midpoint and were eliminated before being allowed to complete the Roadblock.
- After the first Roadblock, teams had to travel to the United States Coast Guard Base at Terminal Island and participate in a search-and-rescue exercise with the Coast Guard. After a response boat took them out into the ocean, teams had to swim to a crash test dummy, set off a safety smoke bomb, and swim with the dummy back to the boat before receiving their next clue, which directed them to ConGlobal Industries.
- In this season's final Roadblock, the team member who did not perform the previous Roadblock had to search amongst 15,000 shipping containers for nine with the names of the cities they visited during the race and remember a color-coded digit on each container. Without using notes, they then had to write the numbers down on a requisition form in the order that they visited the cities before receiving their final clue, which directed teams to the finish line: Point Vicente Lighthouse in Rancho Palos Verdes.

City	Numbers		
City	Amy	Misti	Bethany
Saint Thomas	8	2	3
London	1	5	6
Lerwick	7	1	8
Copenhagen	6	0	1
Marrakesh	5	9	6
Palermo	1	5	0
Valletta	4	8	9
Singapore	9	2	3
Manila	8	3	4

== Reception ==
=== Critical response ===
The Amazing Race 25 received positive reviews. Jodi Walker of Entertainment Weekly called this season a "good underdog story". Daniel Fienberg of HitFix was critical of some structural decisions but was positive towards this season overall. Daron Aldridge of Box Office Prophets called it an "otherwise enjoyable season" and wrote, "I think it was very entertaining and most of the challenges were fun to watch because they were actually challenging." Alex Morella of "Survivor Oz" said "Well…it started really well…went bland in the middle for a bit…but finished strongly! I enjoyed this season and The Amazing Race put out a good product for its Silver Anniversary! I enjoyed the teams…quite a few of the challenges (although several better detours are needed in some legs…and no Morocco!)" In 2016, this season was ranked 7th out of the first 27 seasons by the Rob Has a Podcast Amazing Race correspondents. In 2023, Rhenn Taguiam of Game Rant ranked this season as the fourteenth-best season. In 2024, Taguiam's ranking was updated with this season ranked 17th out of 36.

=== Ratings ===
U.S. Nielsen ratings

No.	Airdate	Episode title	Rating/Share		Rank				Viewers (millions)	Ref
No.	Airdate	Episode title	House- holds	18–49	Timeslot (Viewers)	Timeslot (18–49)	Week (Viewers)	Week (18–49)	Viewers (millions)	Ref
1	September 26, 2014	"Go Big or Go Home"	—N/a	1.1/4	2	2	<25	<25	5.48	
2	October 3, 2014	"When You Gotta Go, You Gotta Go"	—N/a	1.2/5	2	2	<25	<25	6.08	
3	October 10, 2014	"Get Your Sheep Together"	—N/a	1.1/4	2	2	<25	<25	5.89	
4	October 17, 2014	"Thinly Sliced Anchovies"	—N/a	1.4/6	1	1	<25	<25	6.57	
5	October 24, 2014	"Morocc'and Roll"	—N/a	1.0/4	3	4	<25	<25	5.51	
6	October 31, 2014	"I Feel Like I Just Kissed a Goat"	—N/a	1.1/5	3	2 (tie)	<25	<25	5.89	
7	November 7, 2014	"Pretty Fly For a Food Scientist"	—N/a	1.2/3	2	2	<25	<25	6.05	
8	November 21, 2014	"Hot Sexy Knights"	—N/a	1.2/4	3	2	<25	<25	5.95	
9	November 28, 2014	"You're Taking My Tan Off"	—N/a	1.0/3	2	2	<25	<25	5.42	
10	December 5, 2014	"Smells Like Dirty Tube Socks"	—N/a	1.2/4	1	1	<25	<25	6.22	
11	December 12, 2014	"Hooping It Up"	—N/a	1.2/4	2	2	<25	<25	5.99	
12	December 19, 2014	"All or Nothing"	—N/a	1.3/5	1	1	<25	<25	6.59	

Canadian ratings

Canadian broadcaster CTV also airs The Amazing Race on Fridays. Episodes air at 8:00 p.m. Eastern and Central (9:00 p.m. Pacific, Mountain and Atlantic).

Canadian DVR ratings are included in Numeris' count.

No.	Airdate	Episode	Viewers (millions)	Rank (Week)	Ref
1	September 26, 2014	"Go Big or Go Home"	2.07	15	
2	October 3, 2014	"When You Gotta Go, You Gotta Go"	2.21	10	
3	October 10, 2014	"Get Your Sheep Together"	1.97	13	
4	October 17, 2014	"Thinly Sliced Anchovies"	2.10	13	
5	October 24, 2014	"Morocc'and Roll"	2.14	11	
6	October 31, 2014	"I Feel Like I Just Kissed a Goat"	1.93	16	
7	November 7, 2014	"Pretty Fly For a Food Scientist"	1.99	6	
8	November 21, 2014	"Hot Sexy Knights"	1.99	11	
9	November 28, 2014	"You're Taking My Tan Off"	2.10	11	
10	December 5, 2014	"Smells Like Dirty Tube Socks"	2.09	7	
11	December 12, 2014	"Hooping It Up"	1.97	8	
12	December 19, 2014	"All or Nothing"	2.06	5	
