= Ida Davidsen =

Smørrebrød restaurant in Copenhagen, Denmark

Coordinates: 55°41′04″N 12°35′17″E

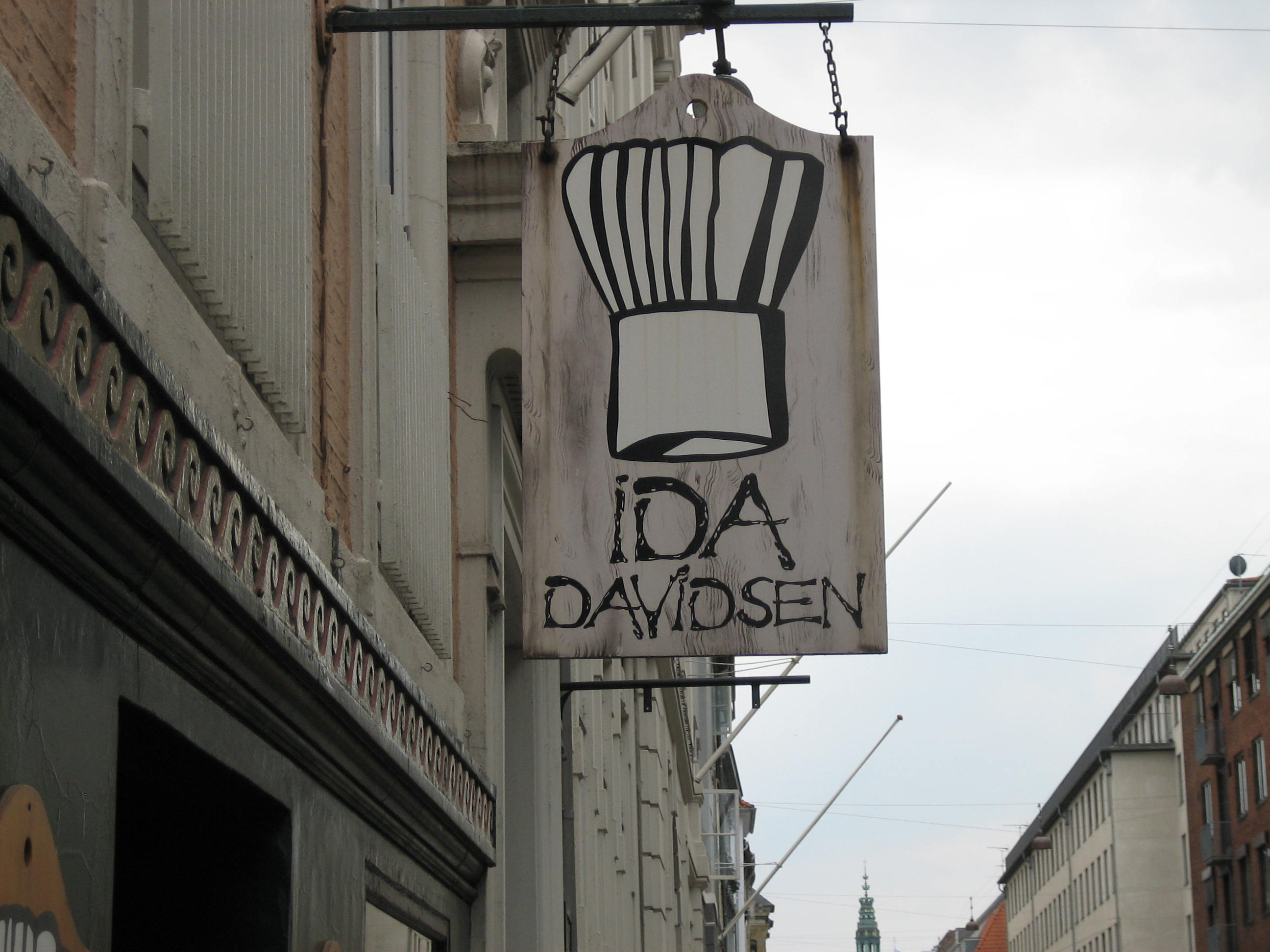
Ida Davidsen Storefront, next to Kongens Nytorv square.

Ida Davidsen is a celebrated smørrebrød restaurant located in the heart of Copenhagen, Denmark. The restaurant is more than a century old and is considered a cultural institution in Denmark with a menu of over 280 varieties of open-faced sandwiches. Popular among tourists and locals alike, Queen Margrethe II has also been known to have the restaurant cater royal events. It is adjacent to the Kongens Nytorv square. It was also featured in a task on The Amazing Race 25.
