= Villa Niscemi =

Building in Palermo, Italy

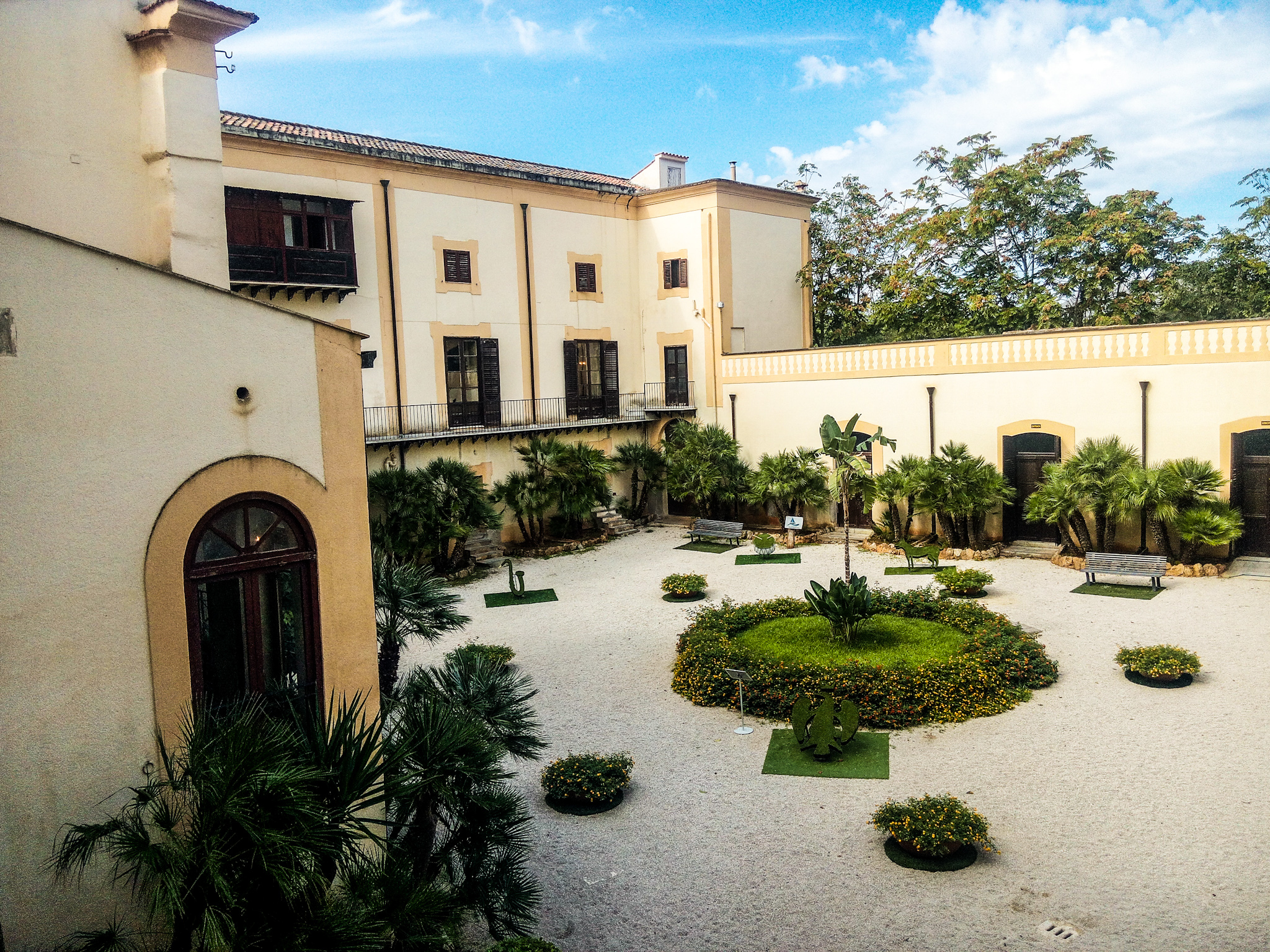
- Villa Niscemi, exterior
- Interactive map of the Villa Niscemi area

General information
- Status: Representing Headquarters of the Comune of Palermo
- Type: Villa
- Architectural style: Renaissance and Baroque
- Location: Palermo, Sicily, Italy, Piazza dei Quartieri, 2
- Coordinates: 38°09′53.53″N 13°20′03.41″E
- Construction started: 16th century
- Completed: 18th century
- Client: Valguarnera family

Technical details
- Floor count: 3

Villa Niscemi is a villa in Palermo. It is located in the north-western part of the city, near La Favorita Park.

== History ==
The villa has been the main residence of the noble Valguarnera family for about three centuries. The origins of the building date back to the 16th century, but the villa has taken the current aspect during the late 18th century. In fact, at that time, the Valguarnera family reconfigured the existing structure, by giving it a more Baroque physiognomy and enriching it of paintings, frescoes and other artworks.

The famous jeweller Fulco di Verdura, son of Carolina Valguarnera, spent his childhood in this villa.

In 1987 the Valguarnera family sold the villa to the Comune of Palermo and, thus, the villa has been chosen as one of the representing headquarters of the Mayor.

== In popular culture ==
The villa appeared on the seventh episode of The Amazing Race 25 as the pit stop.
