= Bab ad-Debbagh =

City gate in Marrakesh, Morocco

- باب الدباغين
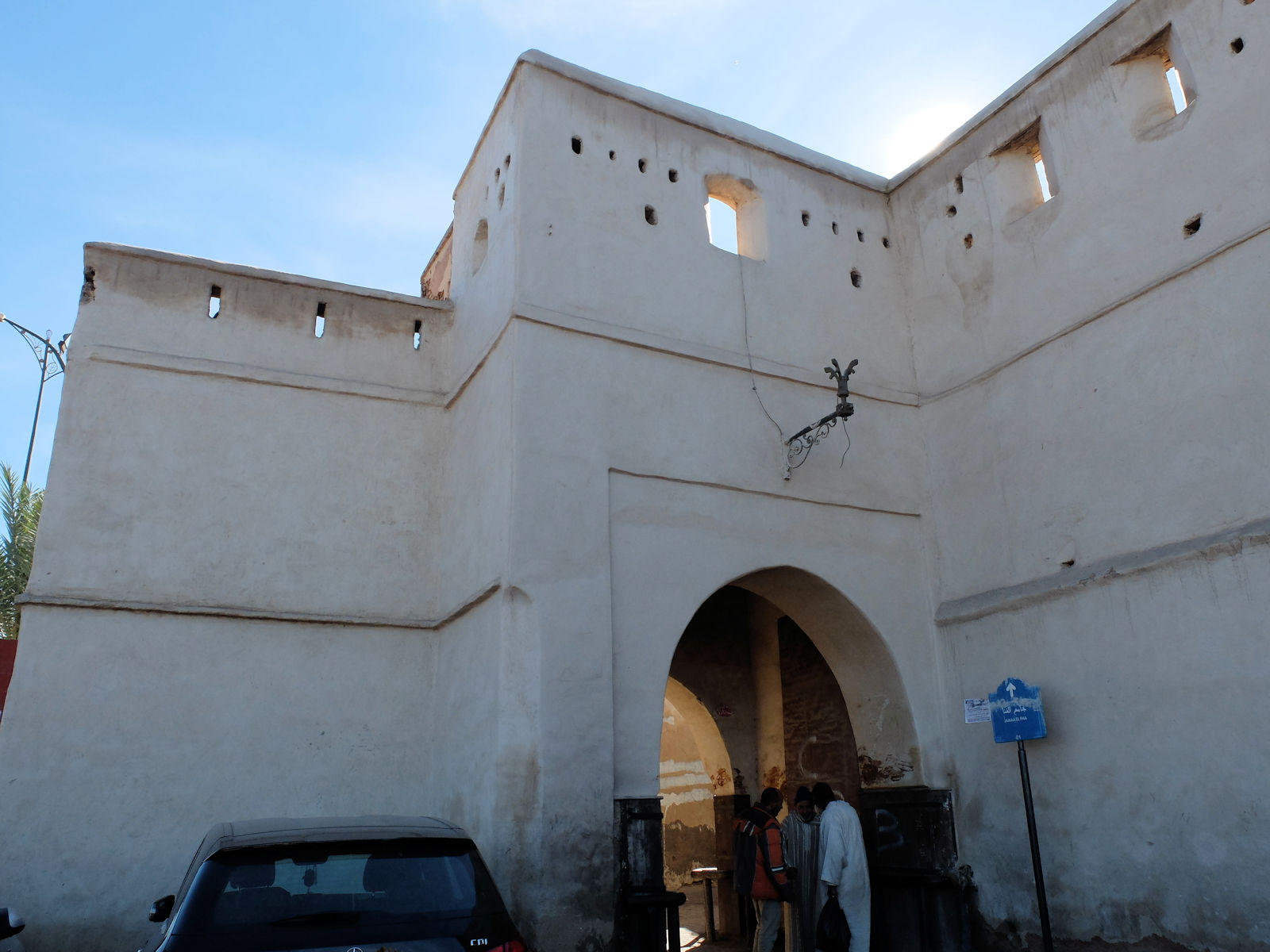
- Interactive map of the Bab ad-Debbagh area

General information
- Type: city gate
- Architectural style: Almoravid, Moorish, Moroccan
- Location: Marrakesh, Morocco
- Coordinates: 31°37′25.2″N 7°58′29.4″W
- Completed: circa 1126

Bab ad-Debbagh or Bab Debbagh (Arabic: باب الدباغين, lit. 'gate of the tanners') is one of the main eastern gates of the medina (historic walled city) of Marrakesh, Morocco.

== Description ==
The gate is the northernmost of the two eastern gates of the medina. It dates back to around 1126 CE when the Almoravid emir Ali ibn Yusuf built the first walls of the city. Its name means "Gate of the Tanners" and refers to the nearby tanneries which have been present here since the Almoravid period.

It has the most complicated layout of any gate in the city: its passage bends 5 times, in an almost S-like path, passing through two open-air courts and one elongated chamber with a vaulted ceiling. A staircase in the southeastern corner of the structure grants access to the roof of the gate. Scholars believe that only the central part of the gate (the vaulted chamber) dates back to the original Almoravid gate and that the inner and outer courtyard sections were added later by the Almohads. The gate originally would have had a "simple" bent entrance (i.e. turning 90-degrees only once).

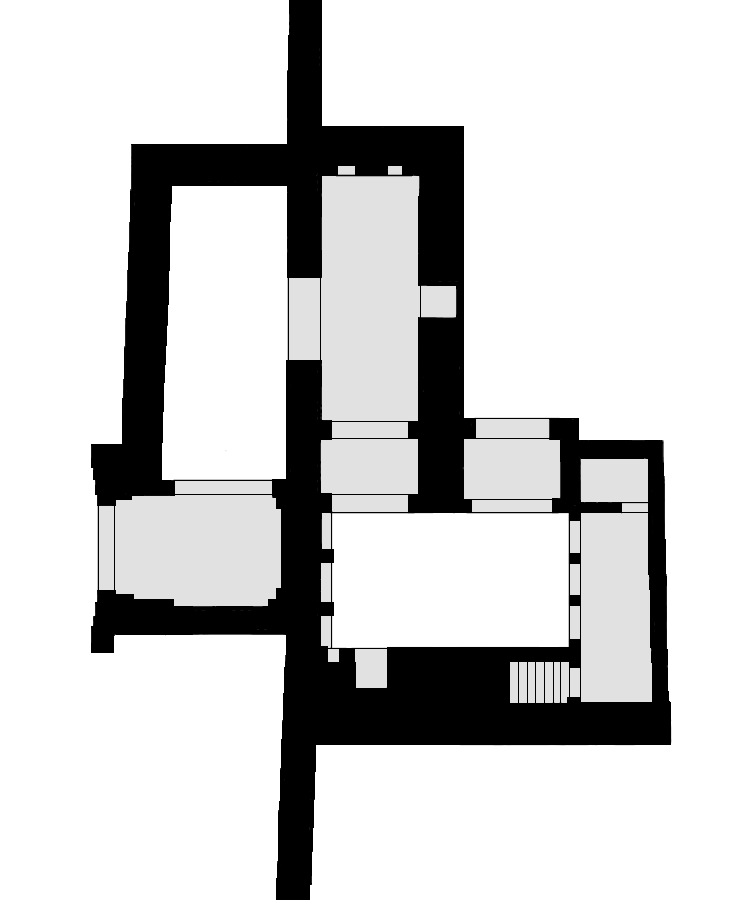
The floor plan of the gate today (light grey shaded areas indicate roofed areas)

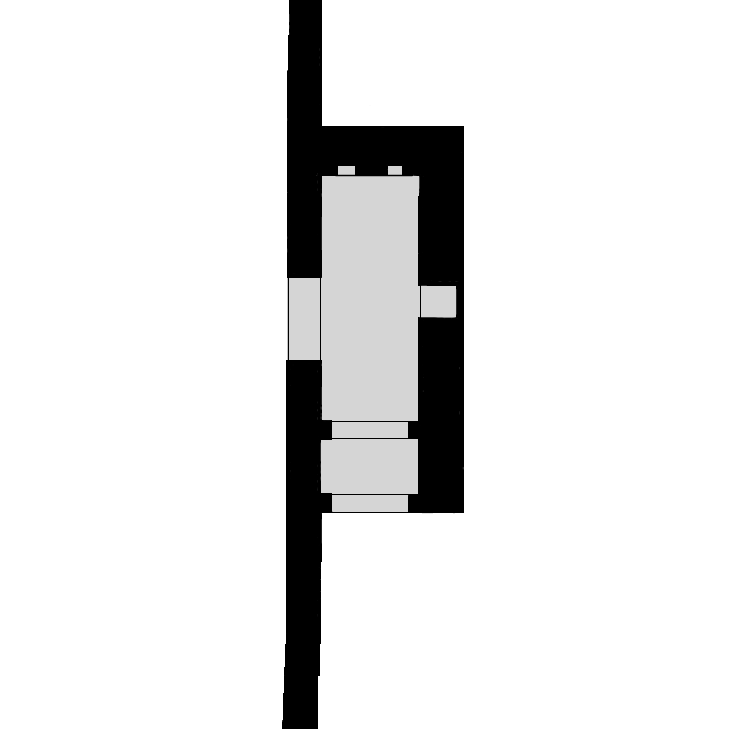
The hypothesized original floor plan of the gate

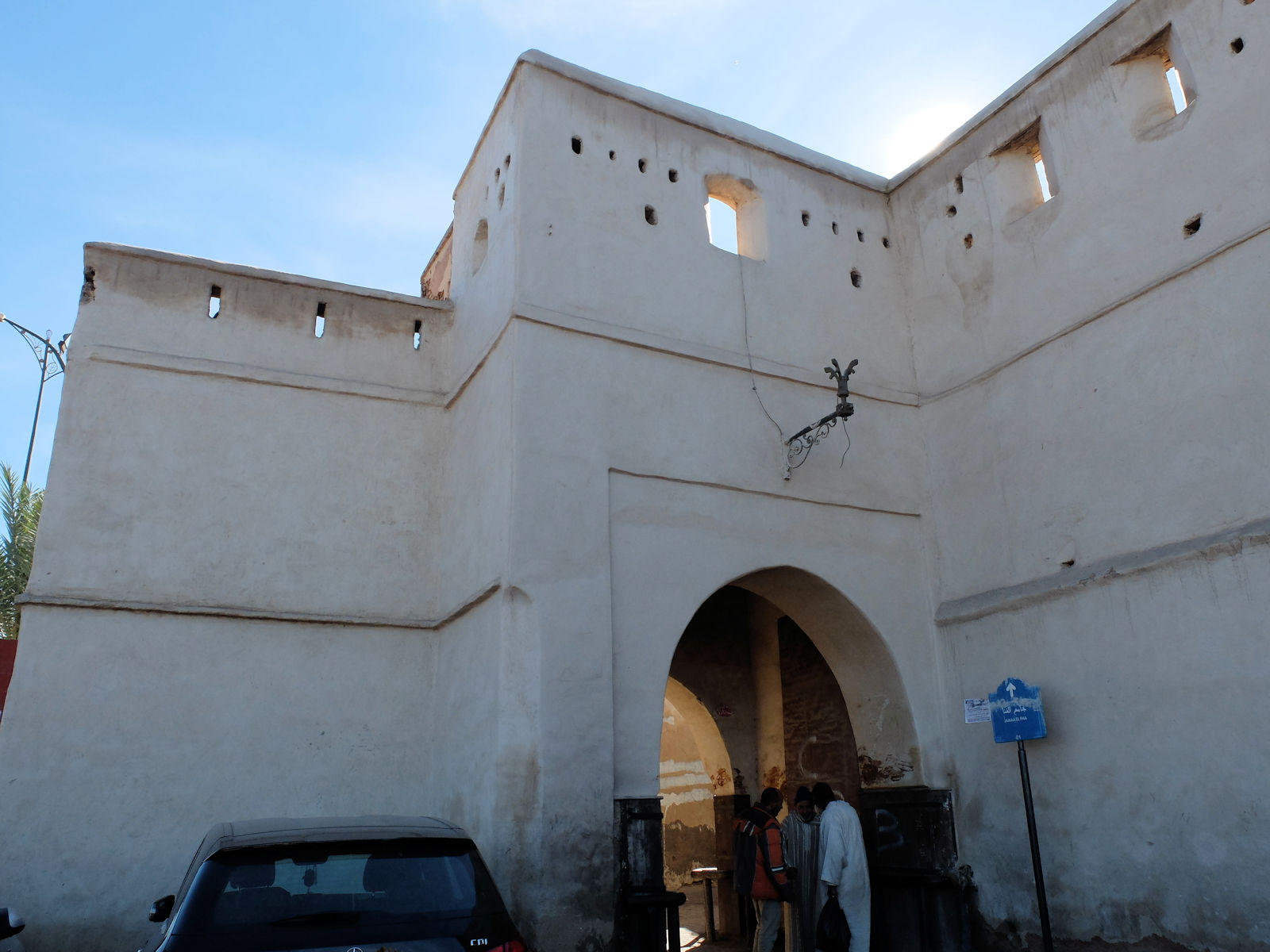
The outer (eastern) entrance of the gate

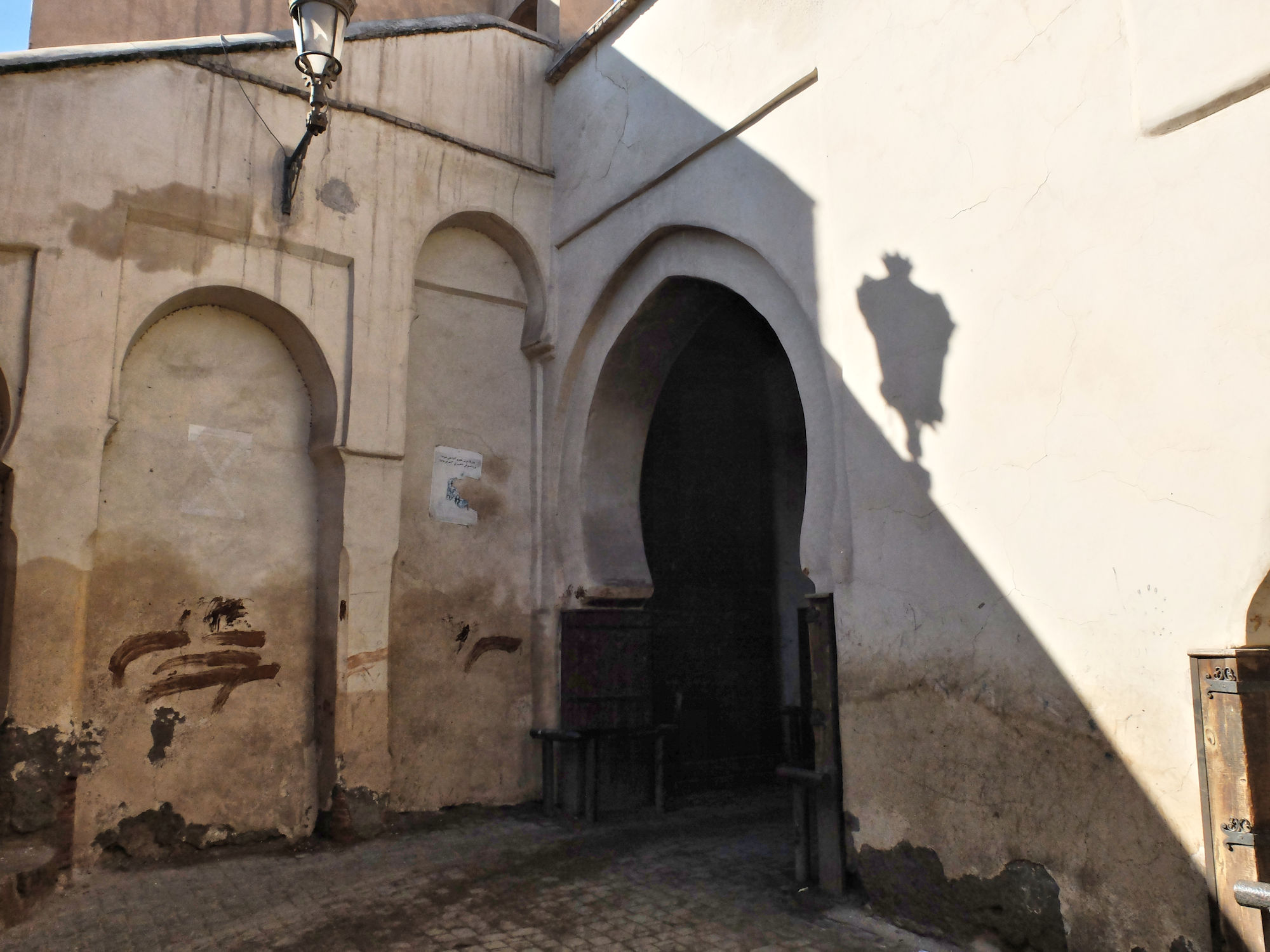
The first (eastern) inner courtyard of the gate, with one of the inner doorways

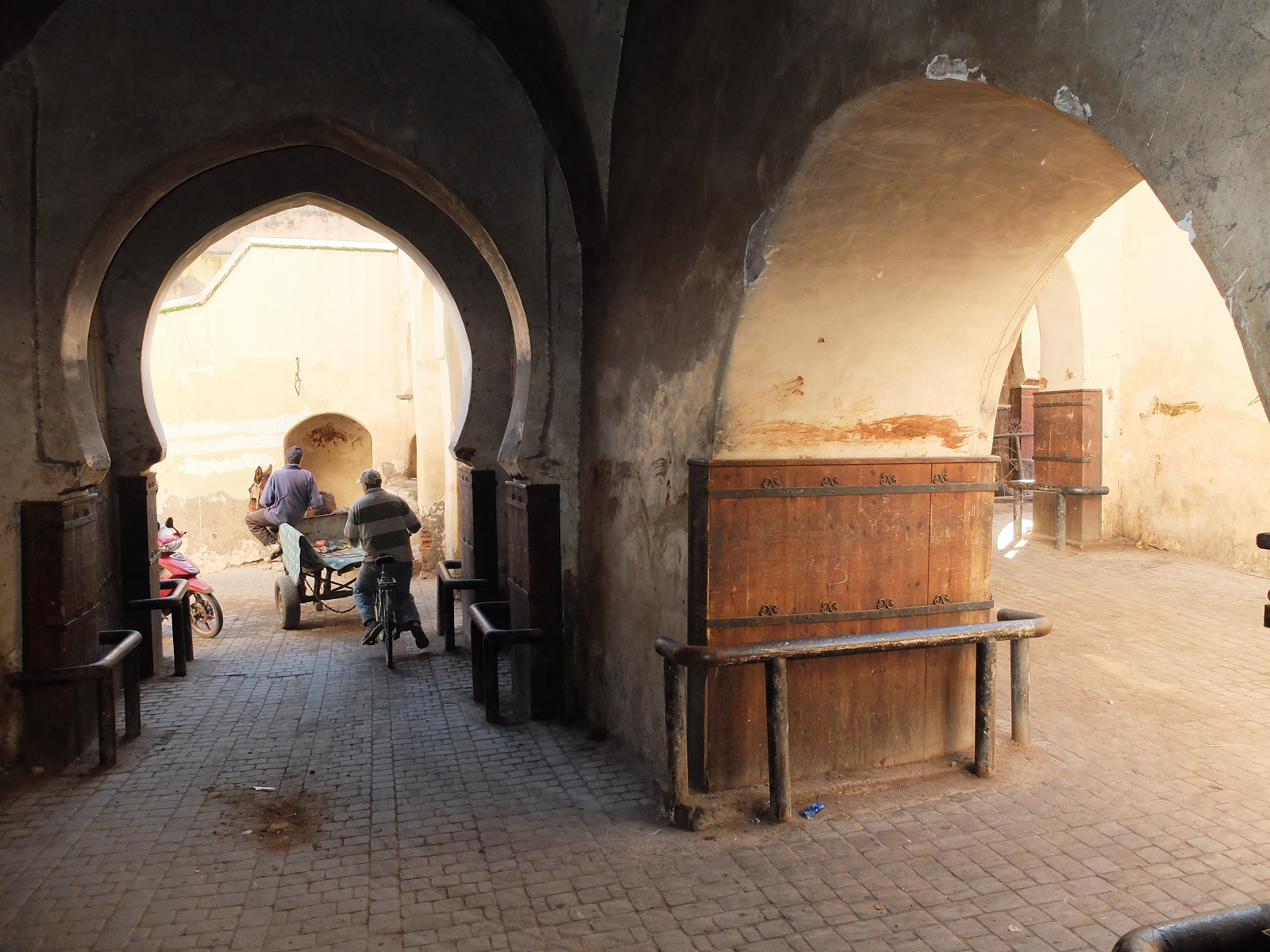
The bending passage inside the gate

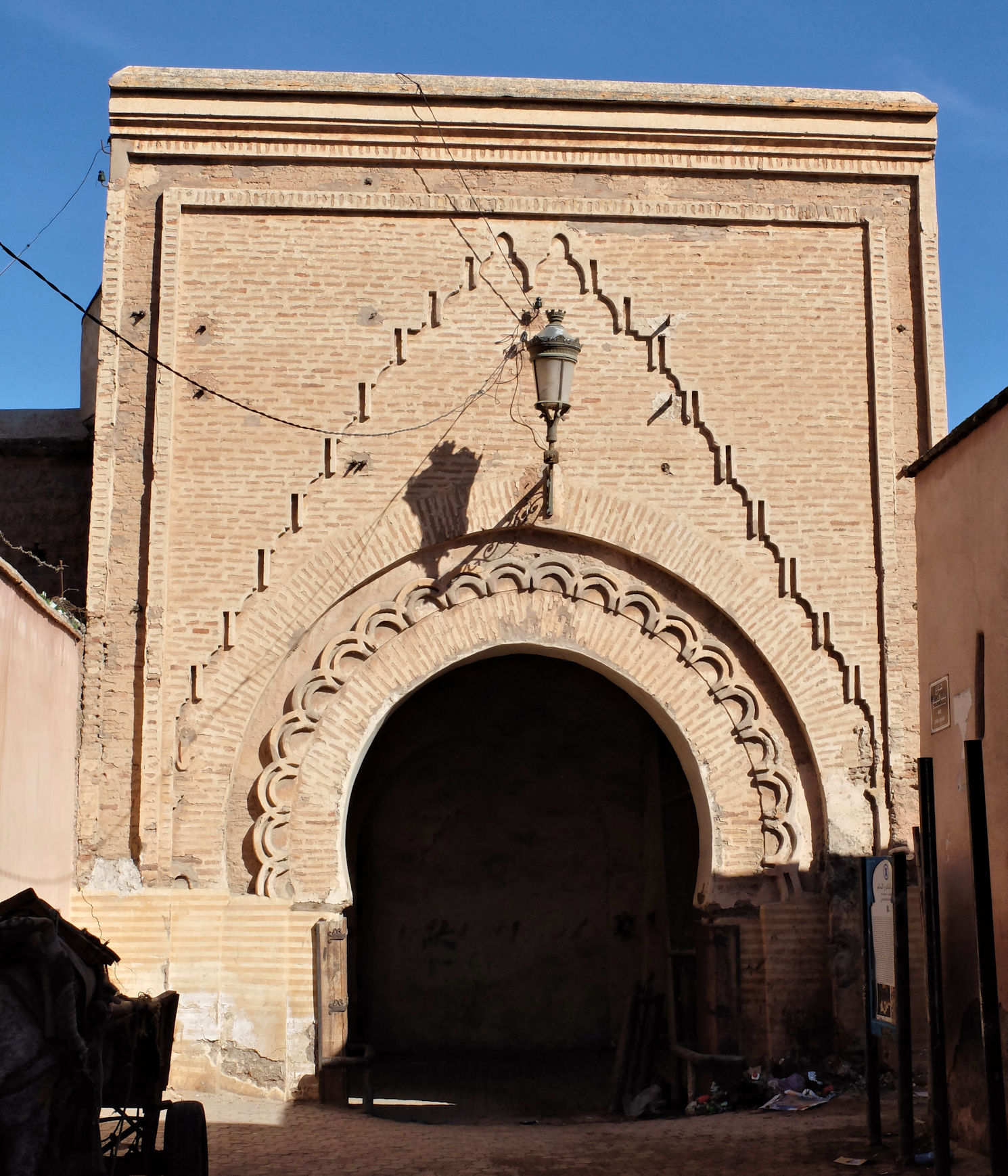
The inner (western) entrance of the gate
