= The Amazing Race 26 =

Season of television series

- Season 26
- Region 1 DVD cover
- Presented by: Phil Keoghan
- No. of teams: 11
- Winners: Laura Pierson & Tyler Adams
- No. of legs: 12
- Distance traveled: 35,000 mi (56,000 km)
- No. of episodes: 12

Release
- Original network: CBS
- Original release: February 25 – May 15, 2015

Additional information
- Filming dates: November 12 – December 6, 2014

Series chronology
- ← Previous; Season 25 Next → Season 27

The Amazing Race 26 is the twenty-sixth season of the American reality competition show The Amazing Race. Hosted by Phil Keoghan, it featured eleven teams of dating couples (six existing couples and five blind date teams who met for the first time at the start of the race) competing in a race around the world to win US$1,000,000. This season visited five continents and nine countries and traveled over 35,000 miles (56,000 km) during twelve legs. Starting in Castaic, California, racers traveled through Japan, Thailand, Germany, France, Monaco, Namibia, the Netherlands, and Peru before returning to the United States and finishing in Dallas. Elements of the show that returned for this season include the Blind Double U-Turn. The season premiered on CBS with a special 90-minute episode on February 25, 2015, and concluded on May 15, 2015.

All three of the final teams were couples matched up as blind dates at the start of the race. Laura Pierson and Tyler Adams were the winners of this season, while Jelani Roy and Jenny Wu finished in second place, and Hayley Keel and Blair Townsend finished in third place.

== Format ==
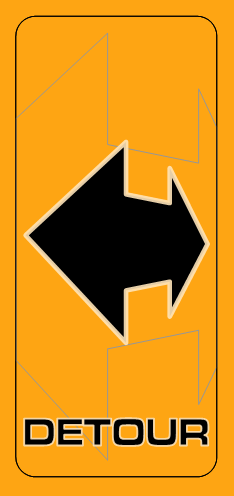
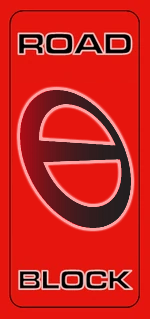
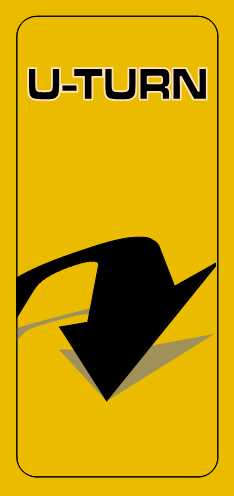
The clues which contestants receive during the course of the race generally fall into four categories: Route Info, Detour, Roadblock, and U-Turn.

The Amazing Race is a reality television show created by Bertram van Munster and Elise Doganieri, and hosted by Phil Keoghan. The series follows teams of two competing in a race around the world. Each leg of the race requires teams to deduce clues, navigate foreign environments, interact with locals, perform physical and mental challenges, and travel on a limited budget provided by the show. At each stop during the leg, teams receive clues inside sealed envelopes, which fall into one of these categories:

- Route Info: These are simple instructions that teams must follow before they can receive their next clue.
- Detour: A Detour is a choice between two tasks. Teams may choose either task and switch tasks if they find one option too difficult. There is usually one Detour present on each leg.
- Roadblock: A Roadblock is a task that only one team member can complete. Teams must choose which member will complete the task based on a brief clue they receive before fully learning the details of the task. There is usually one Roadblock present on each leg.
- U-Turn: The U-Turn allows teams to force another team to complete both options of the Detour before they can continue the race.
- Speed Bump: A penalty for teams who finished in last place on a non-elimination leg. It required the team to complete an additional task in the following leg that only they had to complete.

Most teams who arrive last at the Pit Stop of each leg are progressively eliminated, while the first team to arrive at the finish line in the final episode wins the grand prize of US$1,000,000.

== Contestants ==
The cast of The Amazing Race 26 from left to right: Matt Cucolo, Ashley Gordon, Aly Dudek, Steve Langton, Libby Simpson, C.J. Harris, Laura Pierson, Tyler Adams, Bergen Olsen, Kurt Belcher, Jackie Ibarra, Jeff Weldon, Jelani Roy, Jenny Wu, Blair Townsend, Hayley Keel, Harley Rodriguez, Jonathan Knight, Mike Dombrowski, Rochelle Nevedal, Jeff Magee, and Lyda Grawn

The cast included a pair of dating Olympians: short-track speed skater Aly Dudek and bobsledder Steven Langton; as well as New Kids on the Block singer Jonathan Knight.

At the Pit Stop of the third leg, Matt Cucolo proposed to Ashley Gordon, who accepted.

Contestants	Age	Relationship	Hometown	Status
Jeff Magee	57	Dating for 4 Years (Flight Crew)	McCall, Idaho	Eliminated 1st (in Tokyo, Japan)
Lyda Grawn	49	Dating for 4 Years (Flight Crew)	Scottsdale, Arizona	Eliminated 1st (in Tokyo, Japan)
Libby Simpson	25	Dating for 10 Years (Team Tuskegee)	Tuskegee, Alabama	Eliminated 2nd (in Nagano, Japan)
C.J. Harris	26	Dating for 10 Years (Team Tuskegee)	Tuskegee, Alabama	Eliminated 2nd (in Nagano, Japan)
Harley Rodriguez	41	Dating for 7 Years (Team New Kid)	New York City, New York	Eliminated 3rd (in Bangkok, Thailand)
Jonathan Knight	46	Dating for 7 Years (Team New Kid)	New York City, New York	Eliminated 3rd (in Bangkok, Thailand)
Bergen Olsen	23	Blind Dating (The Blonde Date)	Sunnyvale, California	Eliminated 4th (in Schliersee, Germany)
Kurt Belcher	24	Blind Dating (The Blonde Date)	Butler, Kentucky	Eliminated 4th (in Schliersee, Germany)
Jeff Weldon	26	Blind Dating (Team JJ)	Tampa, Florida	Eliminated 5th (in Saint-Jean-Cap-Ferrat, France)
Jackie Ibarra	27	Blind Dating (Team JJ)	Las Vegas, Nevada	Eliminated 5th (in Saint-Jean-Cap-Ferrat, France)
Aly Dudek	24	Dating for 7 Months (Sochi Love)	Milwaukee, Wisconsin	Eliminated 6th (in Erongo Region, Namibia)
Steve Langton	31	Dating for 7 Months (Sochi Love)	Boston, Massachusetts	Eliminated 6th (in Erongo Region, Namibia)
Matt Cucolo	30	Dating for 3 Years (Legs 1–3); Engaged (Legs 3–10) (The Hairstylists)	Scarsdale, New York	Eliminated 7th (in Otuzco, Peru)
Ashley Gordon	28	Dating for 3 Years (Legs 1–3); Engaged (Legs 3–10) (The Hairstylists)	Scarsdale, New York	Eliminated 7th (in Otuzco, Peru)
Mike Dombrowski	26	Dating for 8 Months (Truck Stop Love)	Traverse City, Michigan	Eliminated 8th (in Burleson, Texas)
Rochelle Nevedal	29	Dating for 8 Months (Truck Stop Love)	Kalkaska, Michigan	Eliminated 8th (in Burleson, Texas)
Hayley Keel	28	Blind Dating (Rx for Love)	Saint Petersburg, Florida	Third place
Blair Townsend	31	Blind Dating (Rx for Love)	Amelia Island, Florida	Third place
Jelani Roy	32	Blind Dating (The Legal Team)	New York City, New York	Runners-up
Jenny Wu	32	Blind Dating (The Legal Team)	Los Angeles, California	Runners-up
Laura Pierson	29	Blind Dating (Team SoCal)	Los Angeles, California	Winners
Tyler Adams	26	Blind Dating (Team SoCal)	Santa Monica, California	Winners

Future appearances

In June 2015, Jackie Ibarra and Jeff Weldon were revealed as additional contestants on the seventeenth season of Big Brother by host Phil Keoghan.

== Contestant progress ==
The following teams are listed with their placements in each leg. Placements are listed in finishing order.

- A red placement with a dagger (†) indicates that the team was eliminated.
- An underlined blue placement with a double-dagger (‡) indicates that the team was the last to arrive at a Pit Stop in a non-elimination leg, and had to perform a Speed Bump task in the following leg.
- An italicized and underlined placement indicates that the team was the last to arrive at a Pit Stop, but there was no rest period at the Pit Stop and all teams were instructed to continue racing. There was no required Speed Bump task in the next leg.
- A purple ε indicates that the team used an Express Pass on that leg to bypass one of their tasks.
- A brown ⊃ indicates that the team used the U-Turn and a brown ⊂ indicates the team on the receiving end of the U-Turn.

Team placement (by leg)
Team	1	2	3	4	5	6	7	8	9	10	11	12
Laura & Tyler	3rd	2nd	4th	4th	6th	6th	2nd	1st⊃ (Note: Laura & Tyler chose to use the U-Turn on Aly & Steve.)	1st	4th	3rd	1st
Jelani & Jenny	1st	1st	3rd	7th	4th	5th	4th	4th^{ε}_{⊂} (Note: Jelani & Jenny used their Express Pass to bypass the Detour on this leg.) (Note: Matt & Ashley chose to use the U-Turn on Jelani & Jenny.)	3rd	2nd	2nd	2nd
Hayley & Blair	8th	9th	2nd	2nd	5th	1st	3rd	3rd	2nd	1st	1st	3rd
Mike & Rochelle	7th⊃ (Note: Mike & Rochelle chose to use the U-Turn on Jeff & Lyda.)	8th	1st	6th	7th	3rd	5th	5th	4th	3rd	4th (Note: This team arrived last at the Pit Stop, but they were instructed to continue racing.)	4th† (Note: Mike & Rochelle were the last team to arrive at the P2 ranch and were eliminated at the midpoint of the final leg.)
Matt & Ashley	9th	7th	6th	8th	2nd	4th	1st	2nd⊃	5th‡	5th†		
Aly & Steve	4th	3rd	5th	3rd	1st	2nd	6th‡	6th†⊂				
Jeff & Jackie	2nd	6th	8th	5th	3rd	7th†						
Bergen & Kurt	6th	5th	7th	1st	8th†							
Harley & Jonathan	5th	4th	9th‡	9th†								
Libby & C.J.	10th	10th†										
Jeff & Lyda	11th†⊂											

== Race summary ==
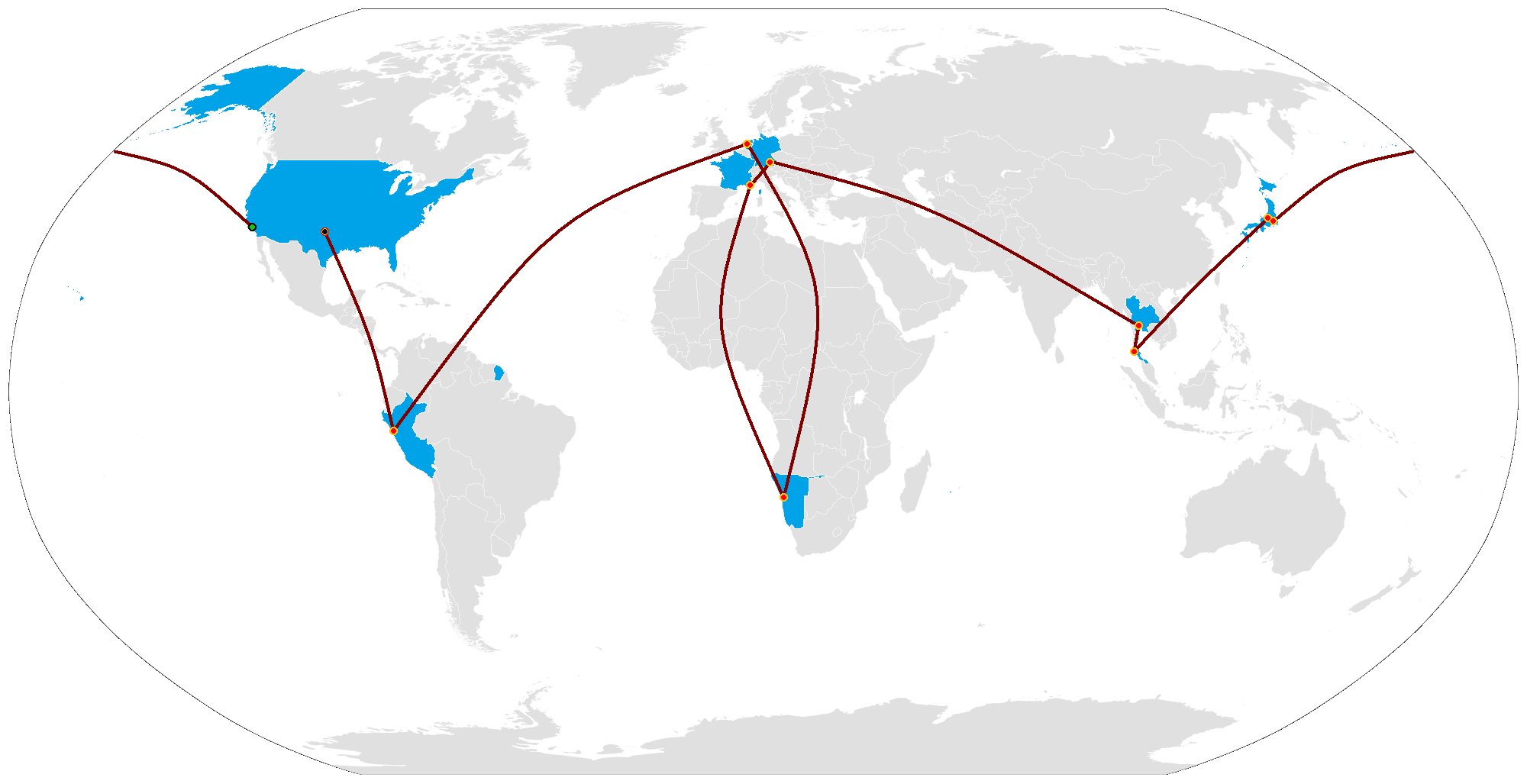
The route of The Amazing Race 26.

Destinations	Air travel Rail travel Water travel Bus travel Helicopter travel Bicycle travel Gondola travel
Route Markers	Detour Roadblock U-Turn Speed Bump Pit Stop

=== Leg 1 (United States → Japan) ===
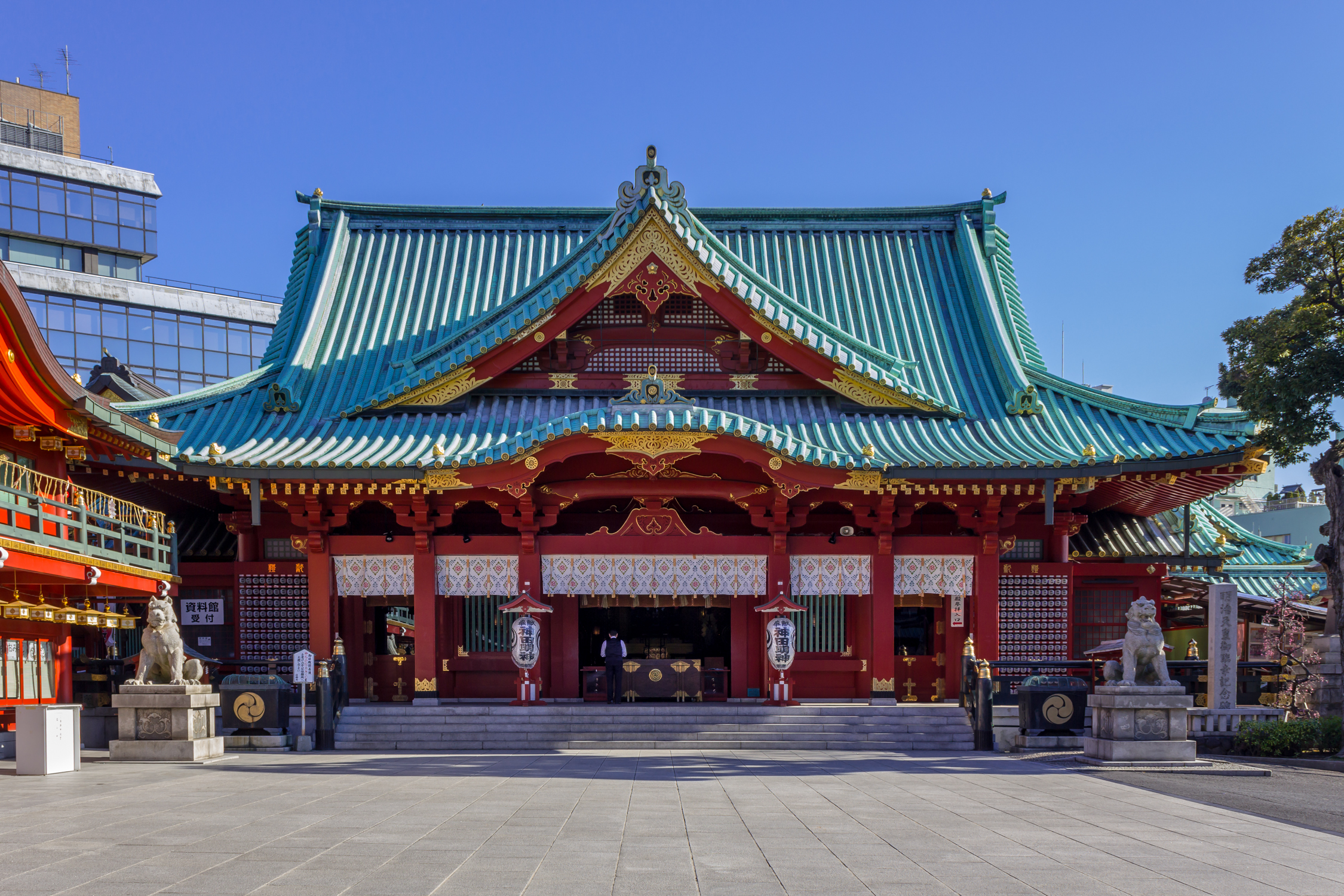
After arriving in Tokyo, teams traveled to Kanda Myojin: a Japanese Shinto shrine.

- Episode 1: "Great Way to Start a Relationship" (February 25, 2015)
- Prize: Express Pass (awarded to Jelani & Jenny)
- Eliminated: Jeff & Lyda

Locations

- Castaic, California (Castaic Lake) (Starting Line)
- Los Angeles → Tokyo, Japan
- Tokyo (Kanda Myojin)
- Tokyo (Shinjuku Central Park or Nakanosakaue Chicken Tavern)
- Tokyo (Wakaba Higashi Park)
- Tokyo (Akihabara UDX Building)

Episode summary

- At Castaic Lake, six dating couples and five blind date couples, who met for the first time at the starting line, began the race. Teams had to complete a mud run obstacle course on the lake shore and grab a ring, which contained airplane tickets to their first destination: Tokyo, Japan. The first eight teams were booked on the first flight and the last three teams were booked on the second flight, which departed 45 minutes later. Once there, teams had to travel to Kanda Myojin, where they found their next clue.
- This season's first Detour was a choice between Syncing Steps or Samurai Sake. In Syncing Steps, teams had to travel to Shinjuku Central Park and learn a series of synchronized robotic dance moves with members of World Order in order to receive their next clue. In Samurai Sake, teams had to travel to Nakanosakaue Chicken Tavern, where they were shown ten bottles of sake. One team member had to take an order from a pair of samurai, while the other team member had to find the correct bottle from a large display. When the correct sake bottle was presented, teams made a toast with the samurai before receiving their next clue.
- After the Detour, teams had to travel to Wakaba Higashi Park in order to find their next clue, which instructed them to search in the vicinity of the Akihabara UDX building for a parking space in order to find the Pit Stop.

Additional note

- This leg featured a Blind Double U-Turn. Mike & Rochelle chose to use the U-Turn on Jeff & Lyda, while Jeff & Lyda chose to use the U-Turn on Jeff & Jackie. However, Jeff & Jackie had already passed the U-Turn by this point and were therefore unaffected.

=== Leg 2 (Japan) ===
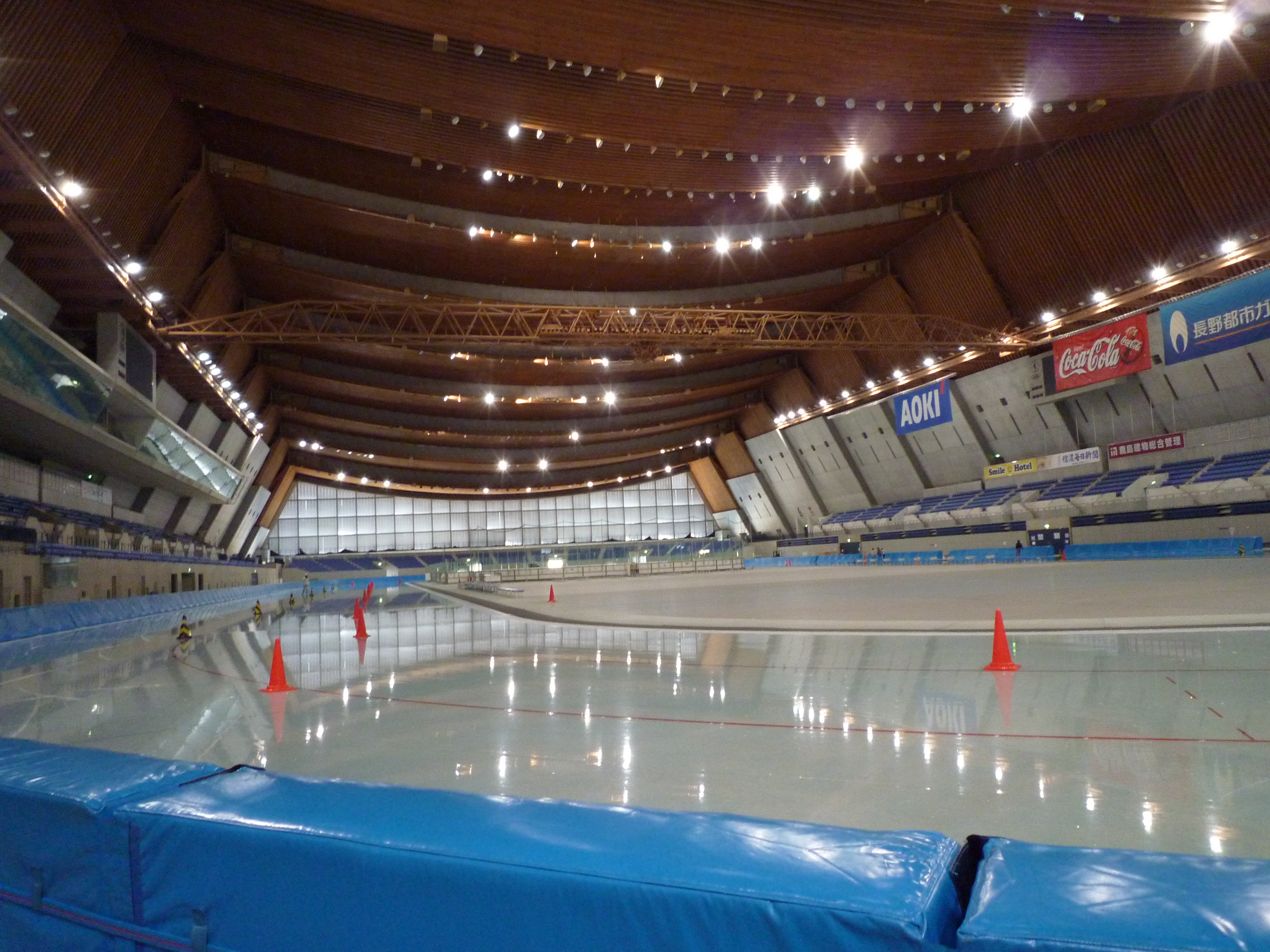
One of the Detour choices in Nagano paid tribute to the 1998 Winter Olympics, where team members had to push their partners around M-Wave's speed skating track.

- Episode 2: "I Got the Smartest Dude" (February 27, 2015)
- Prize: Fitbit watches and a fitness package for each team member, plus a personal chef, cooking lessons, and either a one-year gym membership or a year of fresh grocery delivery (awarded to Jelani & Jenny)
- Date Night Reward: A trip to a Japanese hot spring (awarded to Harley & Jonathan)
- Eliminated: Libby & C.J.

Locations

- Tokyo (Akihabara UDX Building)
- Tokyo → Nagano
- Nagano (Matsushiro Castle)
- Nagano (Nishi-guchi Zenkō-ji)
- Nagano (Takesan Donabe Restaurant or M-Wave Olympic Arena)
- Nagano (Patio Daimon)

Episode summary

- At the start of this leg, teams had to ride a bullet train to Nagano and travel to Matsushiro Castle, where they found their next clue.
- In this season's first Roadblock, one team member had to solve a traditional puzzle box called a yosegi, which contained the password they needed in order to receive their next clue.
- After the Roadblock, teams had to travel to Nishi-guchi Zenkō-ji in order to receive their next clue.
- This leg's Detour was a Blind Detour, where teams only learned about the task that they chose once they arrived at its location. It was a choice between Share or Chair. In Share, teams traveled to the Takesan Donabe Restaurant and had to feed each other a bowl of noodles using only a pair of chopsticks while sitting in front of a large fan in order to receive their next clue. In Chair, teams traveled to the M-Wave Olympic Arena. One team member had to sit on a chair mounted on a sled while their partner pushed the chair around a speed skating track for one lap, after which they switched places for a second lap. Teams had to finish both laps within a combined time of 3:55 minutes in order to receive their next clue.
- After the Detour, teams had to check in at the Pit Stop: the Patio Daimon.

=== Leg 3 (Japan → Thailand) ===
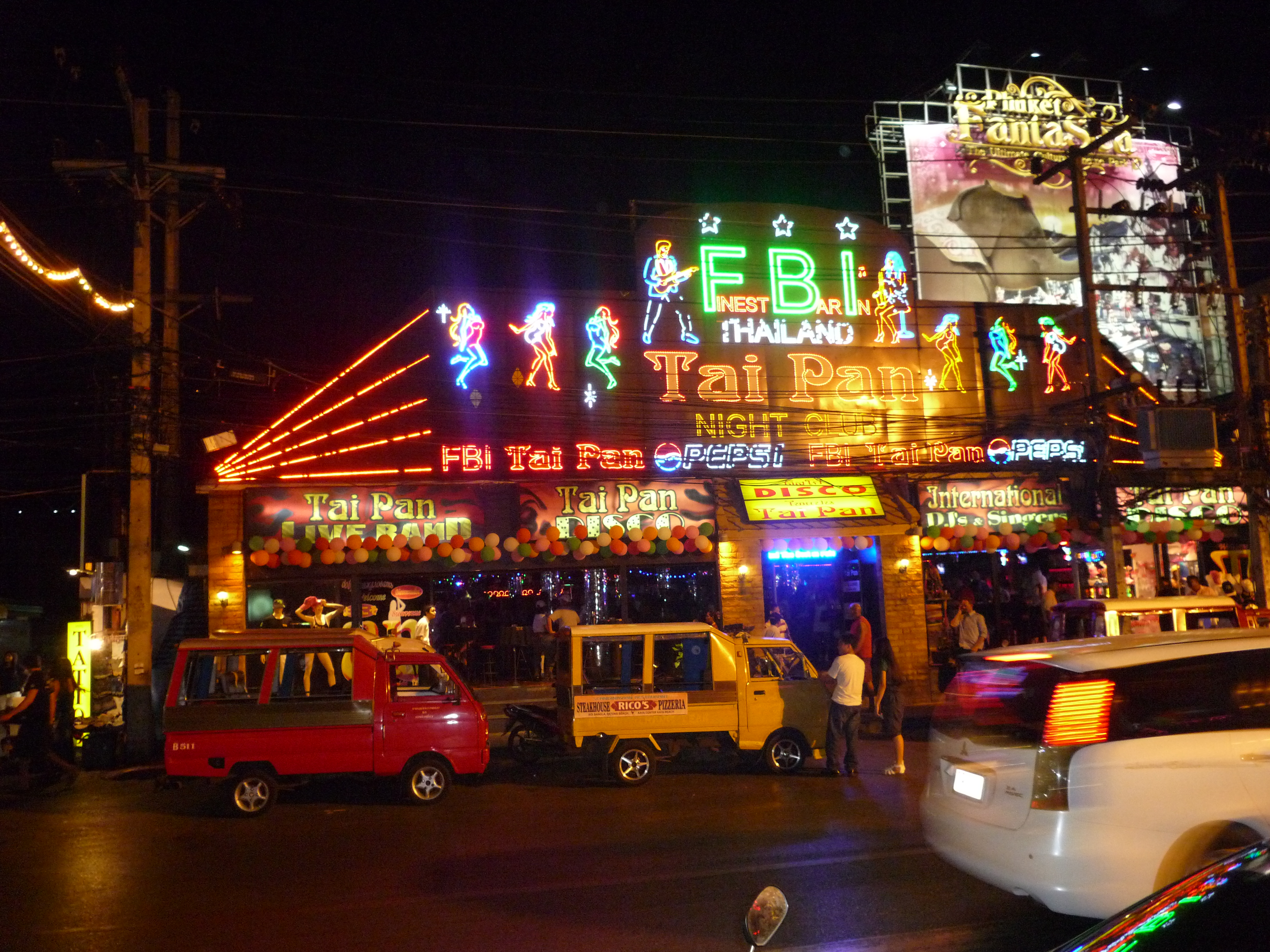
This leg focused on the nightlife in Phuket's Patong Beach.

- Episode 3: "#MurphysLaw" (March 6, 2015)
- Prize: A trip for two to Prague, Czech Republic (awarded to Mike & Rochelle)
- Date Night Reward: A romantic evening on the beach (awarded to Bergen & Kurt, who gifted it to Matt & Ashley)

Locations

- Nagano (Patio Daimon)
- Nagano → Tokyo
- Tokyo → Phuket, Thailand
- Kathu (Patong Beach – Bangla Road)
- Kathu (Patong Beach Bed and Breakfast)
- Mueang Phuket (Baan Teelanka)
- Kathu (Phuket Wake Park or Flying Hanuman)
- Kathu (Patong Beach – My Way Cabaret)
- Mueang Phuket (Sri Panwa Phuket – Baba Nest Rooftop Bar)

Episode summary

- At the start of this leg, teams were instructed to return by train to Tokyo and then fly to Phuket, Thailand. Once there, teams had to travel to Bangla Road and search for a street hawker with selfie sticks. Each selfie stick had one of three departure times the next morning, when teams had to travel to the Patong Beach Bed and Breakfast in Kathu, where they found their next clue. They were then directed to the Baan Teelanka (the "Upside Down House"), where teams had to search for their next clue hanging upside-down from a toilet.
- This leg's Detour was a choice between Ski or Tree. In Ski, teams traveled to Phuket Wake Park, where each member had to ride one lap of the wave pool on a wakeboard in order to receive their next clue. In Tree, teams traveled to Flying Hanuman, where they dressed as waiters and had to deliver a full meal intact to customers via zipline in order to receive their next clue.
- After the Detour, teams had to travel to the My Way Cabaret in order to find their next clue. There, they had to don showgirl costumes and then perform a dance before an audience to the satisfaction of the manager in order to receive their next clue, which directed them to the Pit Stop: the Baba Nest Rooftop Bar at Sri Panwa Phuket.

Additional notes

- This was a non-elimination leg.
- Matt proposed to Ashley at the Pit Stop and she accepted. Bergen & Kurt, who had won the Date Night Reward, gifted it to Matt & Ashley in congratulations.

=== Leg 4 (Thailand) ===
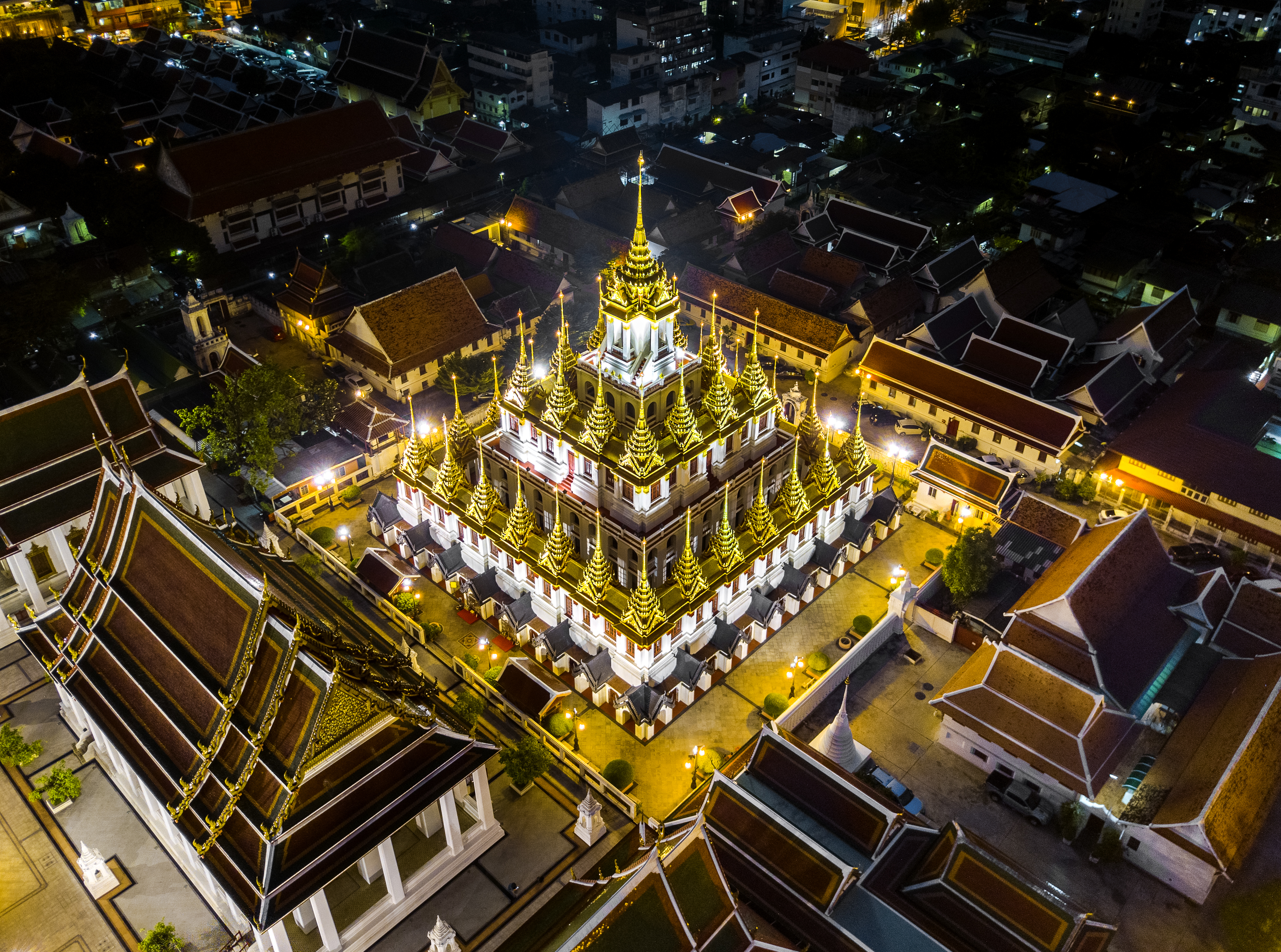
Maha Chetsadabodin Pavilion Court inside the Wat Ratchanatdaram complex, overlooking Loha Prasat, was the Pit Stop for this leg.

- Episode 4: "The Great Amazing Nasty Race" (March 13, 2015)
- Prize: A trip for two to Puerto Vallarta, Mexico (awarded to Bergen & Kurt)
- Date Night Reward: A romantic evening on a water boat at Chao Phraya River (awarded to Laura & Tyler)
- Eliminated: Harley & Jonathan

Locations

- Kathu (Patong Beach)
- Phuket → Bangkok
- Bangkok (Wat Yannawa)
- Bangkok (Snooker Club & Caturday Café or Wat Klang Food Market & Wat Paknam Bhasicharoen)
- Bangkok (Pathumwan Siang Gong)
- Bangkok (Wat Ratchanatdaram – Maha Chetsadabodin Pavilion Court)

Episode summary

- At the start of this leg, teams were instructed to fly to Bangkok, Thailand. Once there, teams had to travel to Wat Yannawa in order to find their next clue.
- For their Speed Bump, Harley & Jonathan had to assemble a traditional Thai grasshopper out of river reeds before they could continue racing.
- This leg's Detour was a choice between Wheel or Water. In Wheel, teams had to travel by tuk tuk to the Snooker Club, where they had to play snooker until they sank a red ball. They then had to take a glass milk bottle to the Caturday Café and feed the cats in order to receive their next clue. In Water, teams had to travel by water taxi to Wat Intharam Pier and then search for Wat Klang Food Market, where both team members had to eat a thousand-year-old egg. They then received a metal placard sending them to the Wat Paknam Bhasicharoen, where they participated in a traditional Thai prayer before receiving their next clue.
- After the Detour, teams had to travel to Pathumwan Siang Gong in order to find their next clue.
- In this leg's Roadblock, one team member had to use power tools to remove the transmission from a faulty engine block. Inside the transmission was a screwdriver with the next clue tucked inside the handle. The clue was a piece of fabric with the inscription "Metal Castle", which directed teams to the Pit Stop at Loha Prasat within Wat Ratchanatdaram.

=== Leg 5 (Thailand → Germany) ===
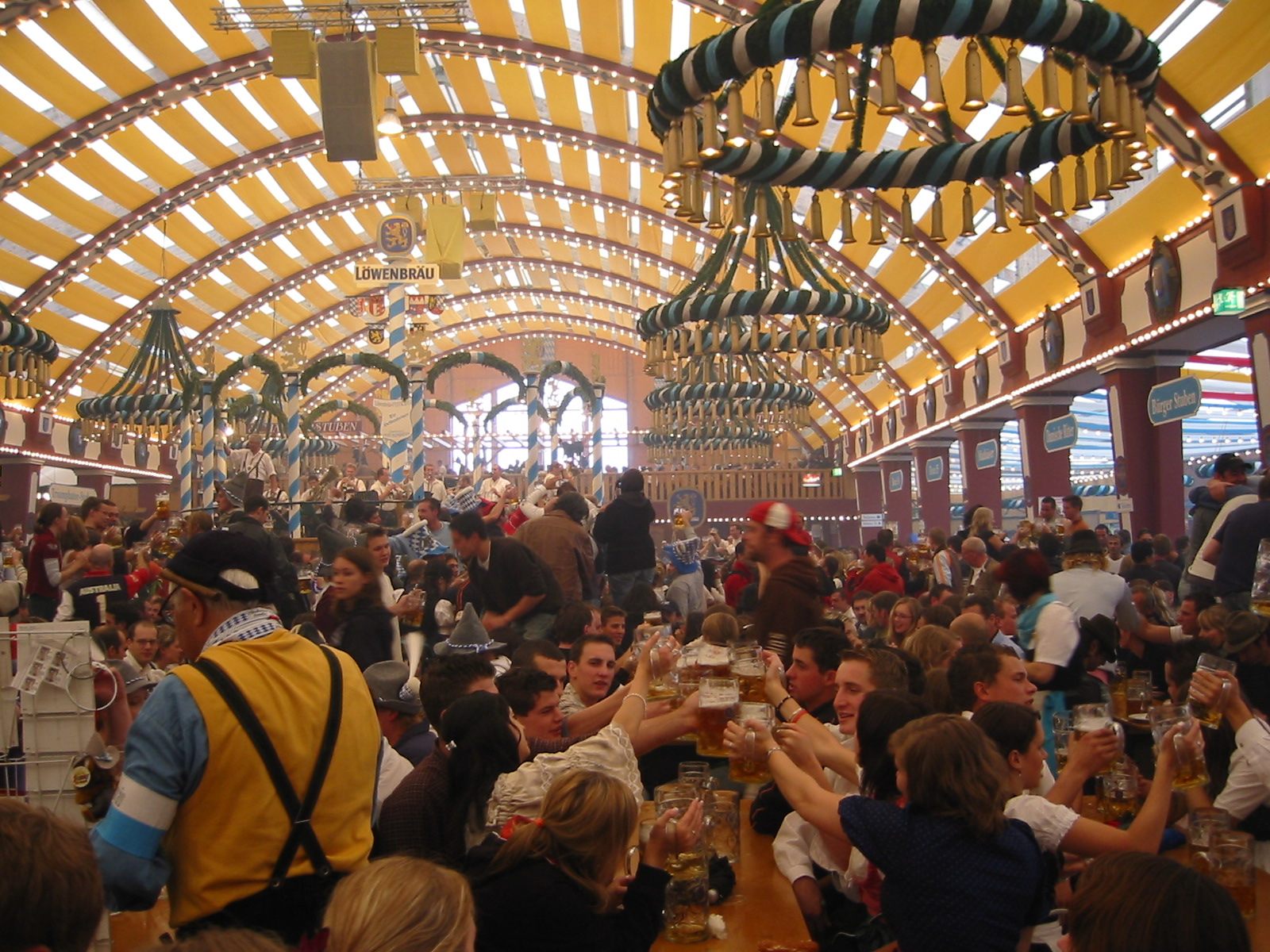
One of the Detour choices in Bavaria required teams to participate in Germany's world-famous beer festival, Oktoberfest.

- Episode 5: "Get in That Lederhosen, Baby" (April 3, 2015)
- Prize: A 2015 Ford Focus for each racer (awarded to Aly & Steve)
- Date Night Reward: A romantic evening at the Bavarian Public Observatory (awarded to Mike & Rochelle)
- Eliminated: Bergen & Kurt

Locations

- Bangkok (Wat Ratchanatdaram – Maha Chetsadabodin Pavilion Court)
- Bangkok → Munich, Germany
- Munich (Wies'n Tracht und Mehr)
- Munich (St. Peter's Church)
- Munich (Schlafwagenfabrik)
- Schliersee (Lake Schliersee)
- Fischbachau (Wolfsee Halle Restaurant) or Bayrischzell (Hasenöhrl-Hof)
- Schliersee (Markus Wasmeier Museum)
- Schliersee (Lake Spitzingsee)

Episode summary

- At the start of this leg, teams were instructed to fly to Munich, Germany. Once there, teams had to travel by train to a clothing shop and don traditional German outfits, which they had to wear for the duration of the leg.
- Teams had to travel to St. Peter's Church, where they had to climb to the top of the Alter Peter Tower and search for a marked vehicle below. They then had to drive to the Schlafwagenfabrik and drive in reverse through a Winter Wonderland, using the car's rear-view camera to see four signposts. At the end of the course, they had to tell the princess their next destination – Schliersee – in order to receive their next clue. Once teams arrived at Lake Schliersee, they had to row to their next clue, which was attached on a buoy.
- This leg's Detour was a choice between Stein or Stack. In Stein, teams traveled to the Wolfsee Halle restaurant, where they had to carry twenty-two steins full of beer and carefully deliver them all at once while walking through a crowd in order to receive their next clue. In Stack, teams traveled to the grounds of Hasenöhrl-Hof and had to vertically stack fifteen empty beer crates in order to receive their next clue.
- After the Detour, teams had to drive to the Markus Wasmeier Museum in order to find their next clue.
- In this leg's Roadblock, one team member had to learn a Bavarian love song and then serenade their partner with correct German pronunciation and musicality while perched on a ladder in order to receive their next clue. If they sang unsatisfactorily, a bucket of water was dumped on them and they had to start over.
- After the Roadblock, teams had to check in at the Pit Stop: Lake Spitzingsee.

Additional note

- Bergen & Kurt left their vehicle behind on their way to the Schlafwagenfabrik because they had difficulty driving it and instead traveled by taxi. They were then issued a two-hour penalty upon arrival. Additionally, Bergen & Kurt had difficulty finding the Hasenöhrl-Hof and were waiting at the train station when they were instructed to stop racing. Phil came to the train station to inform them of their elimination after all of the other teams had checked in.

=== Leg 6 (Germany → France & Monaco) ===
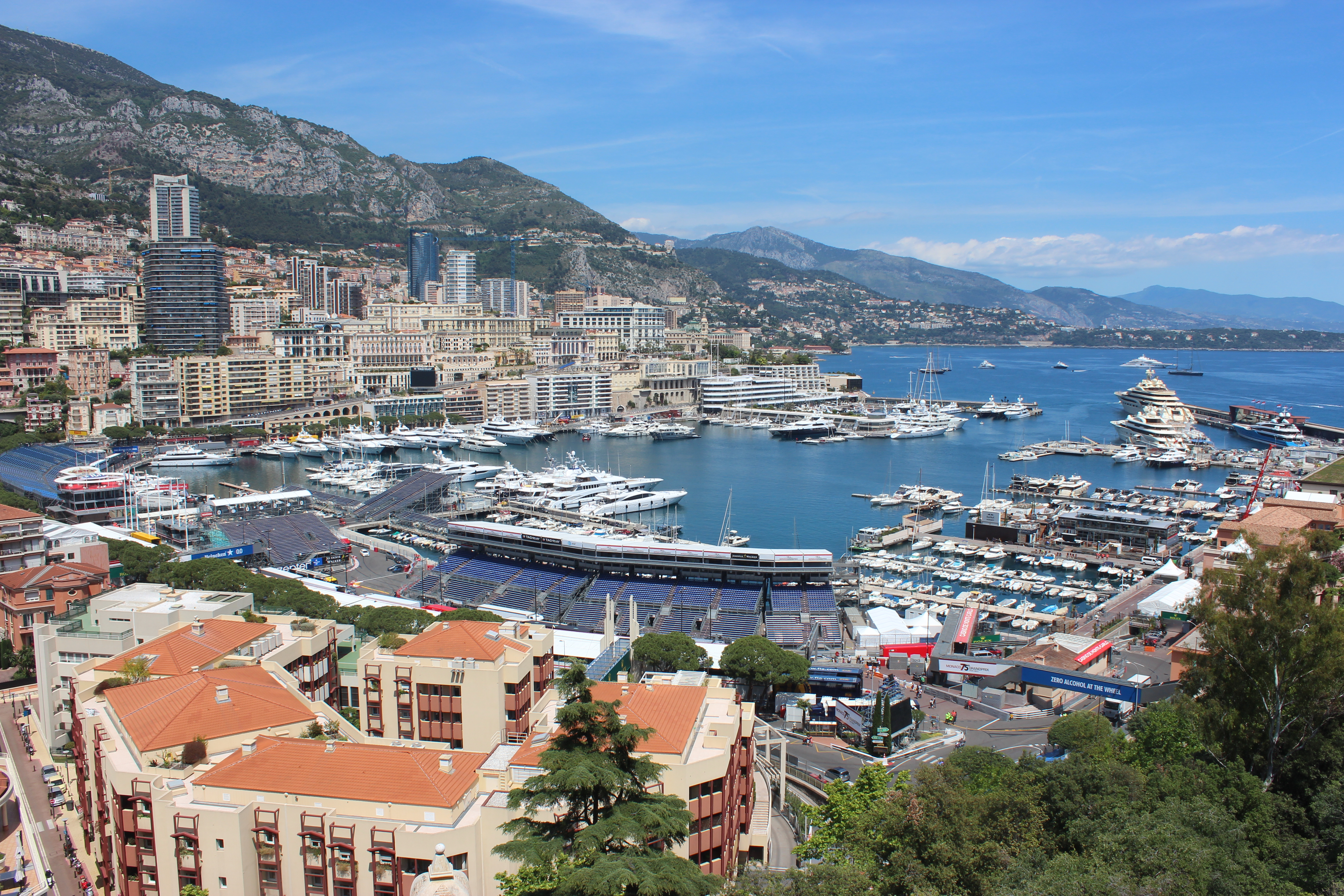
The Roadblock in Monaco had team members searching the yachts around Port Hercules for their partners.

- Episode 6: "Smells Like a Million Bucks" (April 10, 2015)
- Prize: A trip for two to Cape Town, South Africa (awarded to Hayley & Blair)
- Date Night Reward: A romantic evening at a hotel on the French Riviera (awarded to Laura & Tyler)
- Eliminated: Jeff & Jackie

Locations

- Munich (Hotel Pullman)
- Munich → Nice, France
- Nice (Hotel Westminster)
- Nice → Fontvieille, Monaco (Monaco Heliport)
- Monaco-Ville (St Martin Gardens, Chocolaterie de Monaco & Port Hercules)
- Monte Carlo (Casino de Monte Carlo)
- Èze, France (Église Notre-Dame-de-l'Assomption d'Èze) or La Turbie, France (Tête de Chien)
- Saint-Jean-Cap-Ferrat (Plage de Passable)

Episode summary

- At the start of this leg, teams were instructed to fly to Nice, France. Once there, teams had to travel to the Hotel Westminster, where they had to choose from a variety of formal outfits to wear for the rest of the leg. Once they were dressed and ready the following morning, they took a helicopter across the border to Monaco and found their next clue at the heliport.
- In this leg's Roadblock, one team member had to travel by foot and purchase a bouquet of roses at St Martin Gardens and a box of chocolates at the Chocolaterie de Monaco. They then delivered them to their partner waiting on a yacht at Port Hercules, at which point they could receive their next clue.
- After the Roadblock, teams had to travel to the Casino de Monte Carlo and spin a roulette wheel to determine which Detour they had to do.
- A black spin required the teams to do Win By a Nose, where teams had to make Fragonard's signature perfume and cologne by using twelve essences to match the original scents. When the perfumer confirmed that teams correctly recreated the scents, they received their next clue. A red spin required the teams to do Don't Slack Off, where each team member had to zipline 2,000 ft (610 m) above the city to La Turbie and then walk back across a tightrope in order to receive their next clue.
- After the Detour, teams had to check in at the Pit Stop: Plage de Passable in Saint-Jean-Cap-Ferrat.

=== Leg 7 (France → Namibia) ===
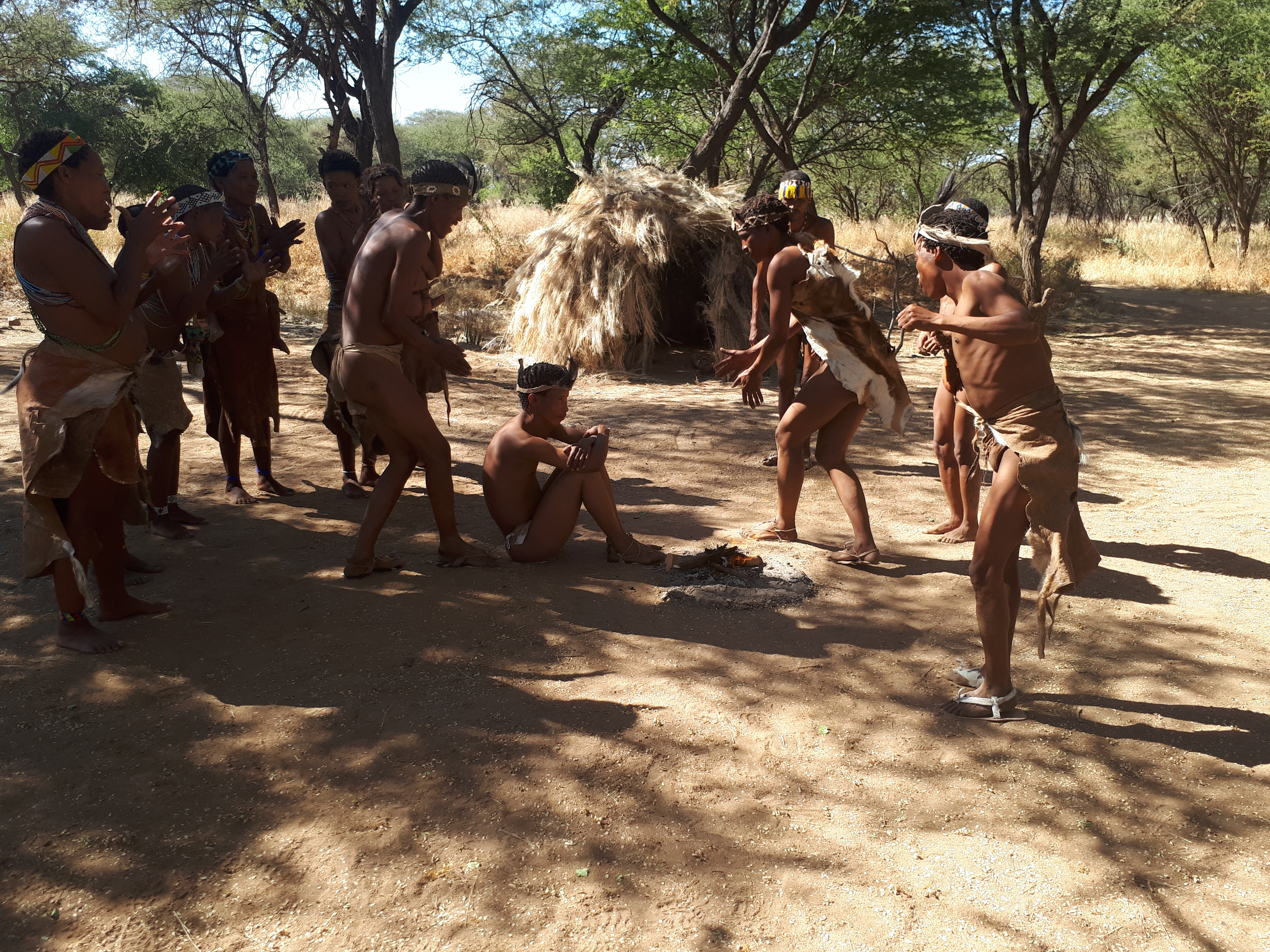
While in Namibia, racers built grass huts for the Roadblock with Bushmen.

- Episode 7: "Back in Business" (April 17, 2015)
- Prize: US$5000 each (awarded to Matt & Ashley)
- Date Night Prize: Massages (awarded to Laura & Tyler)

Locations

- Cap-d'Ail (Marina)
- Nice → Windhoek, Namibia (Hosea Kutako International Airport)
- Windhoek → Omaruru (Erindi Private Game Reserve)
- Omaruru (Erindi Private Game Reserve – San Village)
- Omaruru (Erindi Private Game Reserve – Ranger Headquarters)
- Usakos (Spitzkoppe)

Episode summary

- At the start of this leg, teams were instructed to fly to Windhoek, Namibia. Once there, teams had to search the airport for a bush plane pilot, who flew them to the Erindi Private Game Reserve. There, teams had to drive themselves to a San village, picking up a salt lick en route, in order to retrieve their next clue.
- In this leg's Roadblock, one team member had to work with bushmen to build a traditional hut in order to receive their next clue.
- After the Roadblock, teams had to deliver their salt lick to the head ranger at the ranger headquarters in order to receive their next clue.
- This leg's Detour was a choice between Track or Pack. In Track, teams had to choose a truck and use a telemetric device to track down an elephant in order to receive their next clue. In Pack, teams worked as butchers and had to cut slices of wildebeest meat until they filled a bucket. Teams then boarded a truck and fed the meat to a pack of African wild dogs in order to receive their next clue.
- After the Detour, teams drove themselves to the Pit Stop at the Spitzkoppe.

Additional note

- This was a non-elimination leg.

=== Leg 8 (Namibia) ===
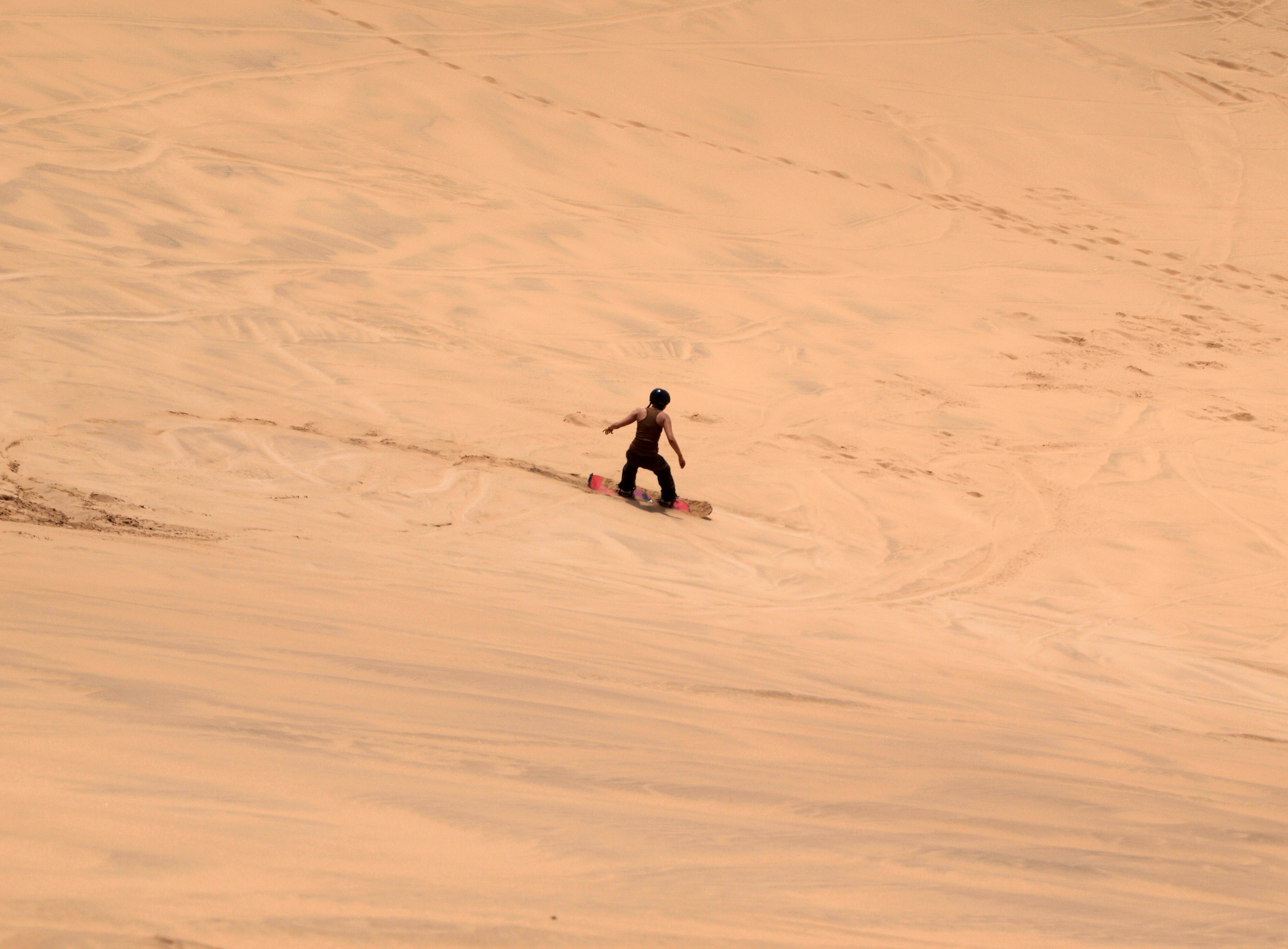
As one of the choices for the second Detour in Namibia, teams took part in sand skiing through the Namib Desert.

- Episode 8: "Moment of Truth" (April 17, 2015)
- Prize: A trip for two to Queenstown, New Zealand (awarded to Laura & Tyler)
- Eliminated: Aly & Steve

Locations

- Usakos (Spitzkoppe)
- Swakopmund (Swakopmunder Buchhandlung)
- Erongo Region (Dorob National Park – Ground Rush Adventures Skydiving Club)
- Erongo Region (Dorob National Park – Snake Bend Pan)
- Erongo Region (Moon Valley Landscape – Goanikontes Oasis)

Episode summary

- At the start of this leg, teams had to find the Swakopmunder Buchhandlung, a German-language bookstore in Swakopmund, where they had to pick up a copy of the Allgemeine Zeitung and find their next clue, which was written in German and directed them to the Ground Rush Adventures Skydiving Club.
- For their Speed Bump, Aly & Steve had to properly assemble six toy airplanes from repurposed soda cans before they could continue racing.
- In this leg's Roadblock, one team member had to watch a yellow supply case drop 1,000 feet (300 m) from an airplane and retrieve it on foot. After locating the case, they had to walk to a hilltop, pick up a Travelocity Roaming Gnome, and then reunite with their partner at the starting point in order to open the case, which contained their next clue.
- After the Roadblock, teams had to drive to Snake Bend Pan in order to find their next clue.
- This leg's Detour was a choice between Work or Play. In Work, teams had to attach five tires to their vehicles and drive 5 miles (8.0 km) over a bumpy dirt road to smooth the road to a foreman's satisfaction in order to receive their next clue. In Play, teams had to sand ski across a series of sand dunes and then slide on a sand board to the bottom of a dune in order to receive their next clue. Jelani & Jenny used their Express Pass to bypass this Detour; however, they still had to do one side of the Detour because they had been U-Turned.
- After the Detour, teams had to drive to the Goanikontes Oasis in the Moon Valley Landscape. There, each team member had to pick one of four animals (a camel, donkey, oryx, or zebra) and lead it to the Pit Stop.

Additional note

- This leg featured a Double U-Turn. Laura & Tyler chose to use the U-Turn on Aly & Steve, while Matt & Ashley chose to use the U-Turn on Jelani & Jenny.

=== Leg 9 (Namibia → Netherlands) ===
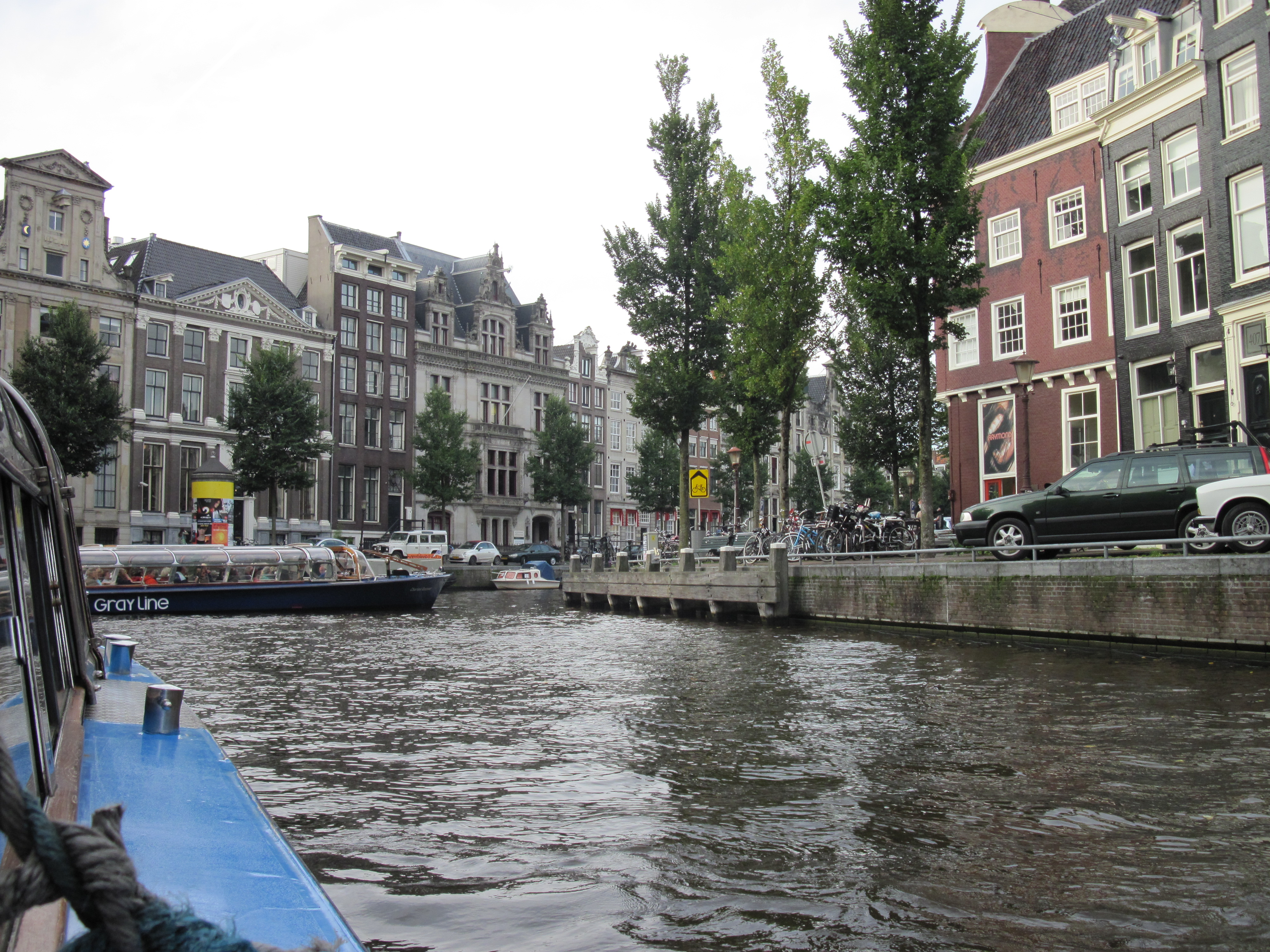
One of the Detour choices in Amsterdam required teams to ride in a hot tub through the canals of Amsterdam.

- Episode 9: "Can I Get a Hot Tub!" (April 24, 2015)
- Prize: A trip for two to Seoul, South Korea (awarded to Laura & Tyler)

Locations

- Erongo Region (Moon Valley Landscape – Goanikontes Oasis)
- Windhoek → Amsterdam, Netherlands
- Ouderkerk aan de Amstel (Jagershuis)
- Amsterdam (Munttoren)
- Amsterdam (Reguliersgracht or Felix Meritis)
- Amsterdam (Museumplein Ice Skating Rink)

Episode summary

- At the start of this leg, teams were instructed to fly to Amsterdam, Netherlands. Once there, teams had to travel to the Jagershuis in Ouderkerk aan de Amstel in order to find their next clue.
- In this leg's Roadblock, one team member had to don a traditional Dutch costume and search among hundreds of klompen (traditional wooden shoes) for the one that exactly matched a display in order to receive their next clue.
- After the Roadblock, teams had to ride bicycles along the Amstel River to the Munttoren in Amsterdam, where they found their next clue.
- This leg's Detour was a choice between Soak or Shuffle. In Soak, teams had to pilot an electric-powered hot tub through the city's canals while solving a rebus along the route. Once teams wrote down the right answer – Ice Skating Rink – they received their next clue. In Shuffle, teams had to play a traditional shuffleboard game called sjoelen and score 51 points in order to receive their next clue.
- After the Detour, teams had to ride their bicycles to the Pit Stop: the ice rink at Museumplein.

Additional note

- This was a non-elimination leg.

=== Leg 10 (Netherlands → Peru) ===
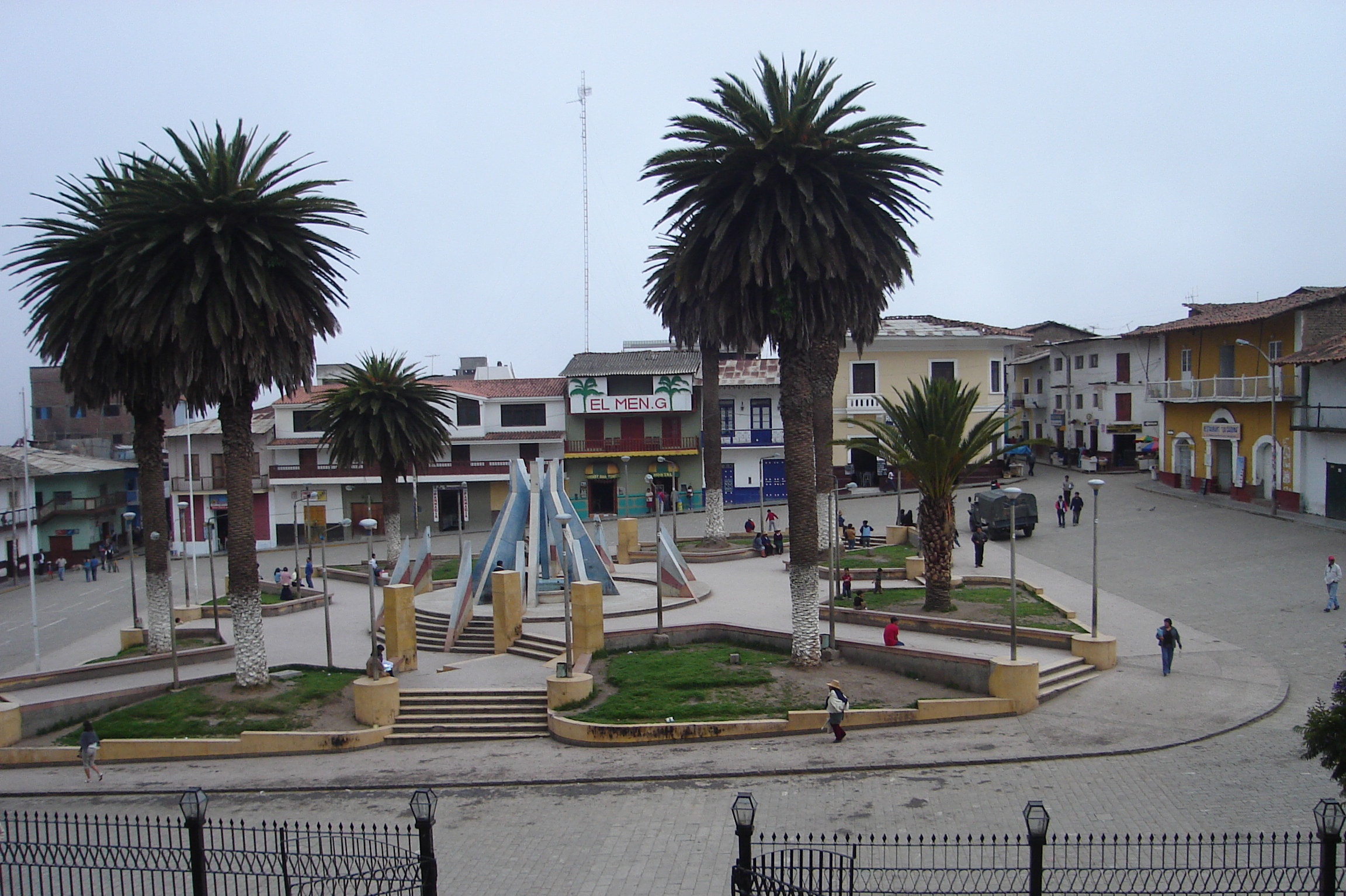
The Plaza de Armas in Otuzco served as the tenth Pit Stop.

- Episode 10: "Fruits of Our Labor" (May 1, 2015)
- Prize: A Fitbit package for each racer, a phone and laptop of the racer's choice, and either home gym equipment or a one-year gym membership (awarded to Hayley & Blair)
- Date Night Prize: A romantic dinner (awarded to Jelani & Jenny)
- Eliminated: Matt & Ashley

Locations

- Amsterdam (Museumplein Ice Skating Rink)
- Amsterdam → Trujillo, Peru
- Trujillo (Plaza de Armas)
- Trujillo (Plazuela de la Merced)
- Santo Domingo (Fundo San Fernando – Cuartel #1)
- Otuzco (Parque Ramón Castillo)
- Otuzco (Mercado Central de Otuzco or Potato Field & Mercado Central de Otuzco)
- Otuzco (Plaza de Armas)

Episode summary

- At the start of this leg, teams were instructed to fly to Trujillo, Peru. Once there, teams had to travel to the Plaza de Armas and find a brass band master of ceremonies, who had their next clue. Teams that arrived at night received a departure time for the next day, when they had to travel to Plazuela de la Merced and find "a shine with the morning sun" (a shoeshine stand) with their next clue, which directed them to Fundo San Fernando.
- For their Speed Bump, Matt & Ashley had to use an old-fashioned typewriter to properly type out a llama loan application before they could continue racing.
- In this leg's Roadblock, one team member had to harvest a row of sugarcane using a machete in order to receive their next clue and a bundle of sugarcane.
- After the Roadblock, teams had to travel to the Parque Ramón Castillo in Otuzco, where they gave their sugarcane from the Roadblock to a fitness expert. They then used a chalkboard to record the activity data (steps and calories) from their fitness watch and calculate the steps needed to work off the calories from the sugarcane juice. Lastly, they had to drink a glass of sugarcane juice in order to receive their next clue.
- This leg's Detour was a choice between Mamas or Papas. In Mamas, teams had to walk through the busy streets of Otuzco's marketplace and purchase the ingredients needed to prepare chicha, a Peruvian moonshine, and then deliver them to an elderly lady known as La Señora de La Chicha. She traded the ingredients for a glass of chicha, which teams had to drink before receiving their next clue. In Papas, teams traveled to a potato field and had to pack potatoes into bags. They then had to deliver the potatoes to a market and correctly arrange each type of potato in separate bins of a marked stall in order to receive their next clue. If the potatoes were incorrectly sorted, they were dumped onto the ground and teams had to start over.
- After the Detour, teams had to walk to the Pit Stop: the Plaza de Armas, across from the Statue of the Virgen de La Puerta.

Additional note

- Teams were provided tickets for a flight to Trujillo, but were under no obligation to use them.

=== Leg 11 (Peru) ===
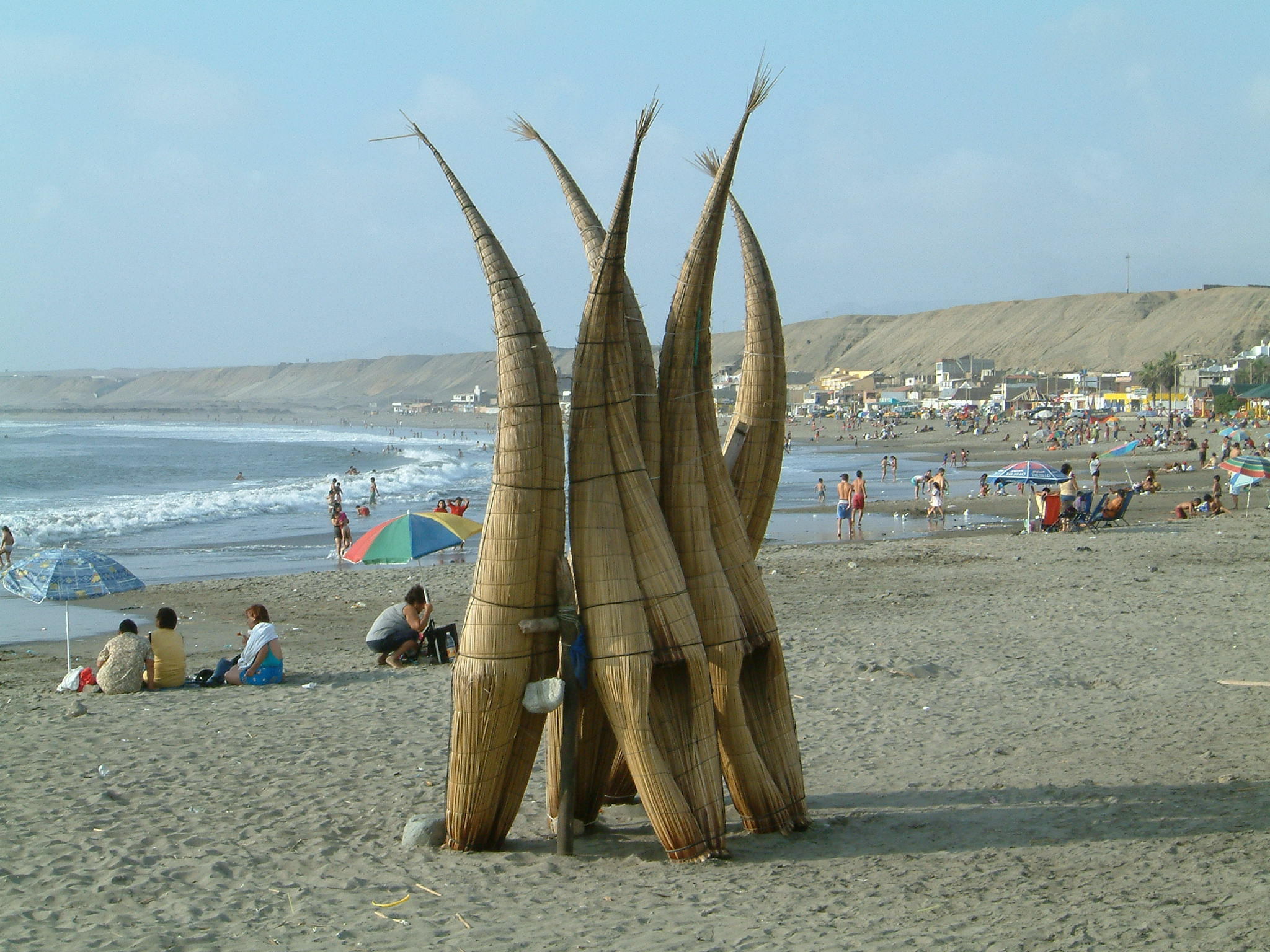
The Roadblock in Huanchaco required racers to take a ride on a caballito de totora.

- Episode 11: "In It to Win It" (May 8, 2015)
- Prize: A trip for two to Goa, India (awarded to Hayley & Blair)

Locations

- Otuzco (Plaza de Armas)
- Trujillo (Universidad Nacional de Trujillo)
- Trujillo (Asociación de Criadores y Propietarios de Caballos de Paso or Chan Chan)
- Huanchaco (Avenida Ribera & Manco Capac)
- Huanchaco (Beach)
- Huanchaco (Church of the Virgen del Socorro)

Episode summary

- At the start of this leg, teams returned to Trujillo and were instructed to search for "South America's largest mosaic." Once there, they had to find a payaso (a clown) with a magnifying glass and were taken to a specific section of the mosaic located outside of the Universidad Nacional de Trujillo, where they had to find a tiny route marker flag and exchange it with the clown for their next clue.
- This season's final Detour was a choice between Shake Your Hips or Make Some Bricks. In Shake Your Hips, teams had to perform the marinera dance in traditional costume to the satisfaction of a judge in order to receive their next clue. In Make Some Bricks, teams traveled to the Chan Chan ruins, where they had to make twelve wet bricks from mud and sand. Once all twelve bricks were completed to the foreman's satisfaction, they used a wheelbarrow to transport twelve dry bricks to a worksite in order to receive their next clue.
- After the Detour, teams had to travel to Huanchaco and find their next clue at the intersection of Avenida Ribera and Manco Capac.
- In this leg's Roadblock, both team members had to carry a caballito de totora to the beach on foot. Once there, the chosen team member had to paddle out to a buoy in order to retrieve their next clue.
- After the Roadblock, teams had to travel on foot to the Pit Stop: the Church of the Virgen del Socorro.

Additional note

- There was no elimination at the end of this leg; all teams were instead instructed to continue racing.

=== Leg 12 (Peru → United States) ===
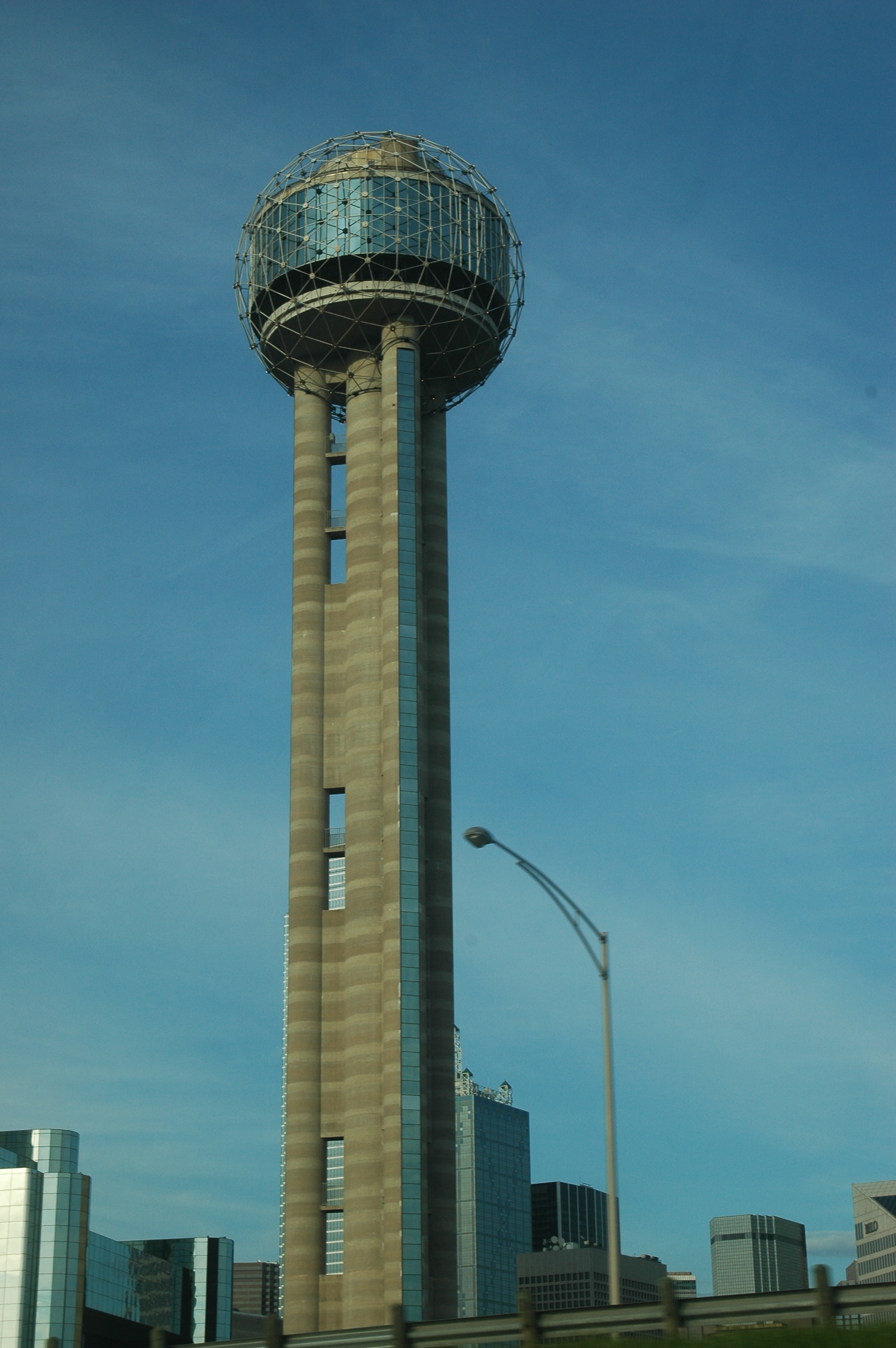
The Reunion Tower in Dallas was the location for the final Roadblock in The Amazing Race 26.

- Episode 12: "Monster Truck Heroes" (May 15, 2015)
- Prize: US$1,000,000
- Winners: Laura & Tyler
- Runners-up: Jelani & Jenny
- Third place: Hayley & Blair
- Eliminated (at the episode's midpoint): Mike & Rochelle

Locations

- Trujillo → Dallas, Texas
- Arlington (AT&T Stadium)
- Burleson (P2 Ranch) (Elimination Point)
- Dallas (Reunion Tower)
- Dallas (Railroad Track Shed near Trinity River)
- Dallas (Continental Avenue Bridge)

Episode summary

- At the start of this leg, teams were instructed to fly to Dallas, Texas. Once there, teams had to travel to AT&T Stadium in Arlington, where they found their next clue.
- In this leg's first Roadblock, one team member had to don a Dallas Cowboys uniform and then get harnessed and pulled to the top of the stadium, where they collected a football playbook. After returning to the ground, they had to catch a touchdown pass and score a field goal in order to receive their next clue.
- After the first Roadblock, teams had to travel to the P2 Ranch in Burleson. There, teams donned cowboy hats, shirts, and boots and worked with cowboys to herd six Texas Longhorn steers into a pen in order to receive their next clue. Mike & Rochelle were eliminated when they arrived at the ranch last and they did not complete this task. Teams then had to travel to Reunion Tower in order to find their next clue.
- In this season's final Roadblock, the team member who did not perform the previous Roadblock had to rappel from the top of Reunion Tower and spot a row of yellow and red flags, which were near the Trinity River and where teams found their next clue.
- At the Trinity River, teams had to drive a monster truck through a bog pit in order to reach their final challenge. Teams had to unlock a shed using a combination which corresponded to the leg numbers in which four places were visited during the season.

Place	Country	Leg
Buchhandlung	Namibia	8
Baan Teelanka	Thailand	3
Munttoren	Netherlands	9
Kanda Myojin	Japan	1

- Once the shed was unlocked, they found enlarged prints of the selfies they had taken during the season and had to attach them to a large world map in chronological order in order to receive their final clue, which directed them to the finish line at the Continental Avenue Bridge.

== Production ==
=== Development and filming ===
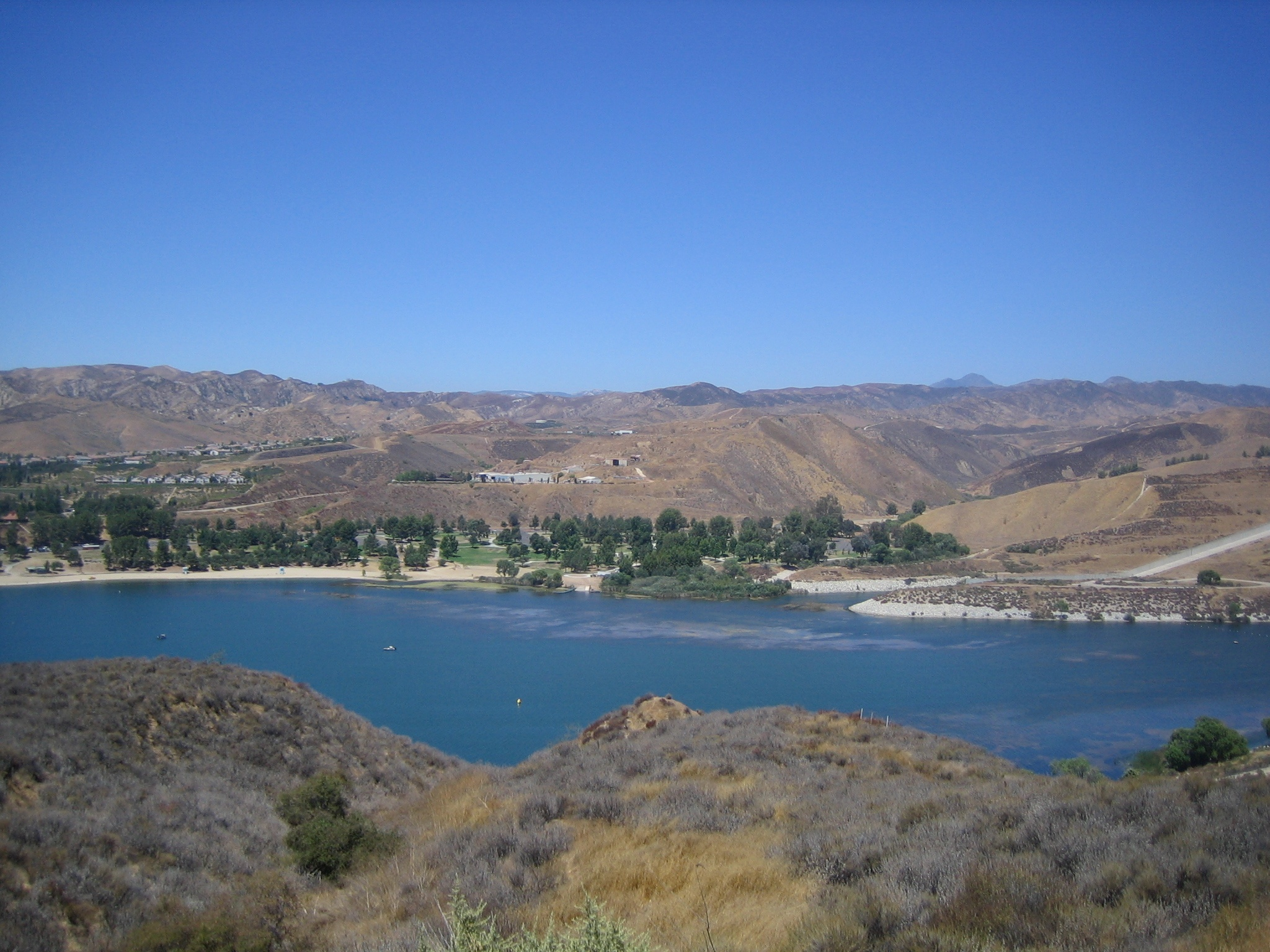
The Amazing Race 26 began at Castaic Lake outside of Los Angeles.

Filming for this season began on November 12, 2014 at Castaic Lake. After 25 days of filming, the season concluded in Dallas, Texas on December 6.

This season covered 35,000 miles (56,000 km), five continents, and nine countries, including a first-time visit to Monaco. On some legs, teams could receive special Date Night rewards, which were inserted randomly in clue envelopes. These allowed the lucky team an opportunity to participate in a romantic activity during the Pit Stop.

For the second season in a row, four teams competed in the final leg. However, host Phil Keoghan eliminated one team in the middle of the final leg, leaving only three teams to race to the finish line.

=== Casting ===
Big Brother 16 HouseGuest Donny Thompson was contacted to compete with his then-girlfriend Kristine Bartley, but the latter declined. Erika Kirk also auditioned for this season with her then-boyfriend JT Massey.

=== Marketing ===
Travelocity and Ford continued their sponsorships with The Amazing Race. Fitbit became a new sponsor this season. Each team member received Fitbit devices, which were used in one of the tasks in the tenth leg. This was also the last season to have Ford as a sponsor for the show.

== Reception ==
=== Critical response ===
The Amazing Race 26 received mixed reviews. Daniel Fienberg of HitFix wrote that "'Amazing Race' tried to do something that 'Amazing Race' wasn't equipped to do this season and the experiment was an utter failure, but it speaks to the resiliency of the format that it didn't destroy the season entirely. I don't think this was a great season of 'The Amazing Race,' but whatever problems I had with the season were entirely about weakly integrated product placement, redundant challenges and problematic Race architecture that left too many Legs stagnant and unchanged from start to finish." Meredith Goodman of The Daily Northwestern was negative towards the blind date format calling it "the tackiest gimmick of all". Jodi Walker of Entertainment Weekly wrote that "this season has been a weird one, but it's certainly been interesting." Rob Moynihan of TV Insider wrote that the blind date "gamble paid off, with most of that season's memorable moments stemming from the contempt between blind dating medical professionals Hayley and Blair." Luke Gelineau of TV Equals wrote "I ended up liking this season a bit more than I thought I was going to." In 2016, this season was ranked 25th out of the first 27 seasons by the Rob Has a Podcast Amazing Race correspondents. Kareem Gantt of Screen Rant wrote that "it was a truly suspenseful race throughout the season, and the cast was thoroughly likable, so much so that you hated for any team to get bumped off of this season." In 2024, Rhenn Taguiam of Game Rant ranked this season 22nd out of 36.

=== Ratings ===
U.S. Nielsen ratings

No.	Title	Air date	Rating/share (18–49)	Viewers (millions)	DVR (18–49)	DVR viewers (millions)	Total (18–49)	Total viewers (millions)	Ref
1	"Great Way to Start a Relationship"	February 25, 2015 (Note: The season premiere was a special 90-minute episode that aired at Wednesday 9:30 PM ET.)	1.5/4	6.16	0.9	—N/a	2.4	—N/a	
2	"I Got the Smartest Dude"	February 27, 2015	1.1/4	6.15	0.7	—N/a	1.8	—N/a	
3	"#MurphysLaw"	March 6, 2015	1.2/5	6.07	0.7	—N/a	1.9	—N/a	
4	"The Great Amazing Nasty Race"	March 13, 2015	1.3/5	6.29	—N/a	—N/a	—N/a	—N/a	
5	"Get in That Lederhosen, Baby"	April 3, 2015 (Note: No episodes aired on March 20 or March 27 as a result of CBS's coverage of the 2015 NCAA Men's Division I Basketball Tournament.)	1.3/5	6.05	—N/a	1.93	—N/a	8.00	
6	"Smells Like a Million Bucks"	April 10, 2015	1.1/4	5.75	—N/a	—N/a	—N/a	—N/a	
7	"Back in Business"	April 17, 2015 (Note: To make up for one of the delayed episodes due to coverage of the 2015 NCAA Men's Division I Basketball Tournament, another episode aired immediately after this one.)	1.1/4	5.46	0.7	—N/a	1.8	—N/a	
8	"Moment of Truth"	April 17, 2015	1.1/4	5.46	0.7	—N/a	1.8	—N/a	
9	"Can I Get a Hot Tub!"	April 24, 2015	1.1/4	5.75	0.7	—N/a	1.8	—N/a	
10	"Fruits of Our Labor"	May 1, 2015	1.1/5	5.52	—N/a	—N/a	—N/a	—N/a	
11	"In It to Win It"	May 8, 2015	1.1/5	5.48	0.7	—N/a	1.8	—N/a	
12	"Monster Truck Heroes"	May 15, 2015	1.1/5	5.72	0.6	1.81	1.7	7.53	

Canadian ratings

Canadian broadcaster CTV also airs The Amazing Race on Fridays. Episodes air at 8:00 p.m. Eastern and Central (9:00 p.m. Pacific, Mountain and Atlantic).

Canadian DVR ratings are included in Numeris' count.

No.	Air date	Episode	Viewers (millions)	Rank (Week)	Ref
1	February 25, 2015	"Great Way to Start a Relationship"	1.97	10	
2	February 27, 2015	"I Got the Smartest Dude"	1.97	10	
3	March 6, 2015	"#MurphysLaw"	2.05	9	
4	March 13, 2015	"The Great Amazing Nasty Race"	1.96	10	
5	April 3, 2015	"Get in That Lederhosen, Baby"	2.02	6	
6	April 10, 2015	"Smells Like a Million Bucks"	1.98	7	
7	April 17, 2015	"Back in Business"	1.53	19	
8	April 17, 2015	"Moment of Truth"	1.53	19	
9	April 24, 2015	"Can I Get a Hot Tub!"	1.73	16	
10	May 1, 2015	"Fruits of Our Labor"	1.56	19	
11	May 8, 2015	"In It to Win It"	1.67	14	
12	May 15, 2015	"Monster Truck Heroes"	1.77	9	

== Works cited ==
- Castro, Adam-Troy (2006). My Ox Is Broken!. BenBella Books. ISBN 978-1-932100-91-4.
