= Gert Joubert =

Namibian businessperson (born 1948)

Gert Joubert (born 1948 in Mowbray, Cape Town) is a Namibian businessperson. Joubert was born in South Africa but moved to Namibia during the 1960s. While in university, Joubert was followed as a suspected communist by the secret police of the apartheid regime until he approached the police and explained his support for capitalism. Joubert began his business career as a cattle entrepreneur near Otjiwarongo. In 2000, he ventured into eco-tourism and owns the Erindi Private Game Reserve near Omaruru in the Erongo Region.
