= World Order (band) =

Japanese electronic dance band

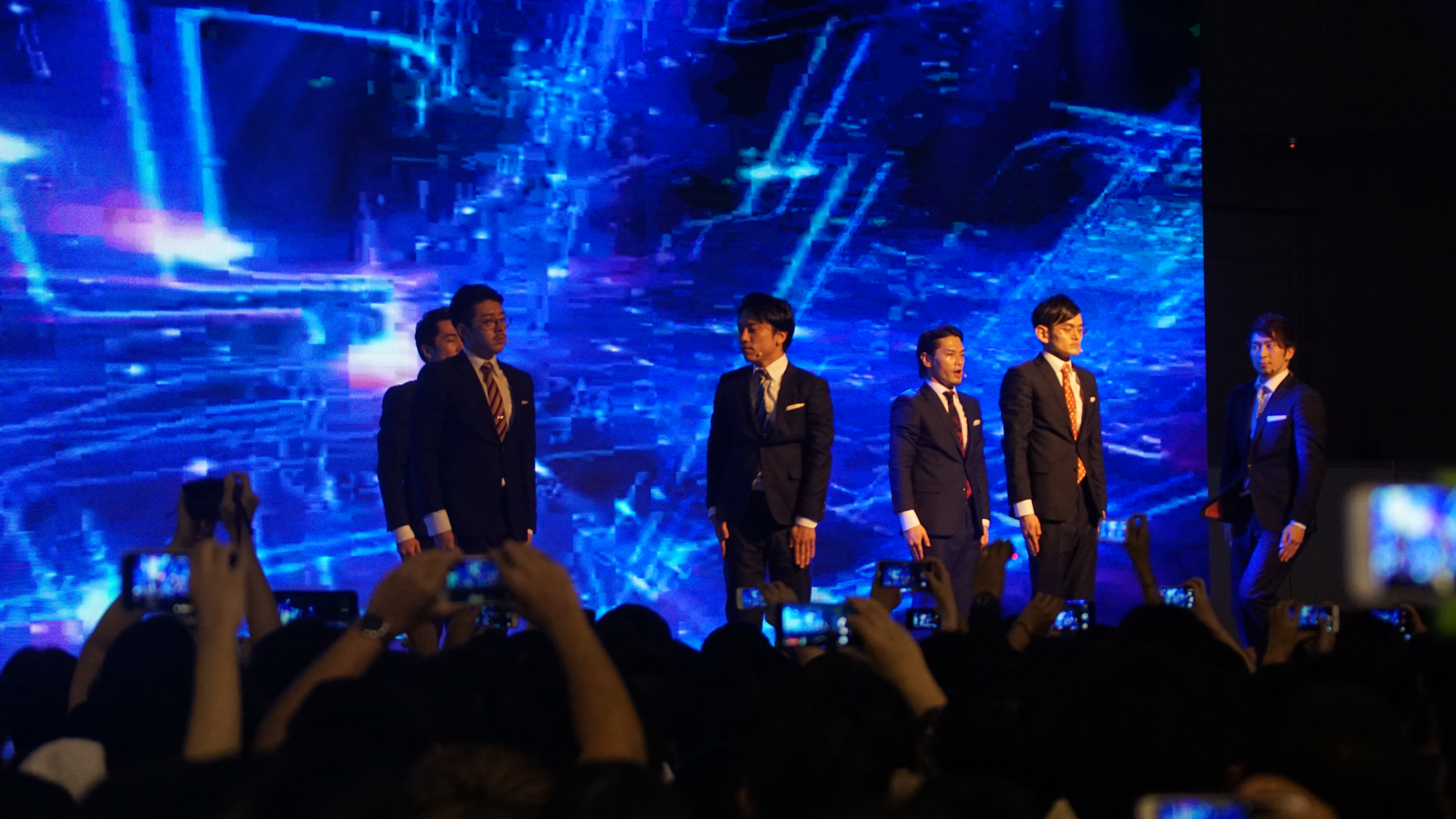
- World Order in February 2016; L-R: Takahashi (obstructed), Tomita, Morisawa, Ochiai, Uchiyama, Jonishi

Background information
- Origin: Japan
- Years active: 2009–present
- Labels: Pony Canyon, TuneCore
- Members: Genki Sudo; Yusuke Morisawa; Hayato Uchiyama; Masato Ochiai; Akihiro Takahashi; Takashi Jonishi; Ryuta Tomita; Keisuke Kimura; Kosuke Shizunaga
- Past members: Kiyoyuki Sakiyama; Ryo Noguchi; Takuro Kakefuda
- Website: worldorder.jp

World Order (stylized as WORLD ORDER) is a 7-member Japanese band formed by Genki Sudo following his retirement from mixed martial arts. The band is best known for their tightly choreographed robotic dance performances in public places. The group went inactive during December 2020 and September 2021. As of January 2026, World Order's YouTube channel has amassed over 248 million views and 779 thousand subscribers.

== History ==
=== 2009–2015: Career beginnings, World Order and 2012 ===
World Order was formed in 2009 by Genki Sudo and a group of 4 other male dancers following Sudo's retirement from mixed martial arts. The original line-up consisted of current members Genki Sudo, Yusuke Morisawa and Hayato Uchiyama, as well as former members Ryo Noguchi and Kiyoyuki Sakiyama. Prior to this, Sudo had been a mixed martial arts fighter, Takushoku University Wrestling section director, and actor. Artists active in the techno genre such as Takashi Watanabe and Ken Ishii have helped to create World Order's musical image. In Japan, after several appearances on popular television programs, World Order's name recognition has expanded to the general public. The group has gained high praise, particularly from abroad, for their play on the visual stereotype of Japanese office workers and robotic dance performances. In a 2014 interview with the Japan Times, Sudo said, "When we started, I liked the idea of adding a bit of humor to the Hollywood stereotype that all Japanese people are serious so I decided we should dance in a robotic way wearing glasses and suits."

On December 16, 2009, World Order released their eponymous debut song "World Order" on iTunes. On July 7, 2010, the band released their debut album, World Order. The music video for "Mind Shift" was released on YouTube on July 24, introducing two new members, Masato Ochiai and Akihiro Takahashi, and making World Order a 7-member group. The band gained recognition for their 2011 song "Machine Civilization," which was produced in response to the 2011 Tōhoku earthquake and tsunami. World Order's "2012" music video, released on October 25, 2011, saw the departure of Kiyoyuki Sakiyama, being effectively replaced by Takeshi Jonishi. It was revealed that members didn't drink much water to save time visiting the bathroom, however it was very hot weather to be in suits. As a result, 3 members were hospitalised while 2 others were almost hospitalised. They later released a music video for "Aquarius" on May 15, 2012.

On March 15, 2012, at a promotional event for Dell Streak Pro in Tokyo, World Order set the Guinness World Record for "Largest Robot Dance" at 647 people. The band danced to their song "World Order" along with 640 dancers. This record was later broken in 2013 by the National Association of College and University Residence Halls at the University of Pittsburgh.

On June 20, 2012, the band released their second album 2012, which peaked at 6th place on the Oricon Weekly Album chart. On August 29, 2012, the group released a music video for "Change Your Life", a song included in the 2012 album.

On September 21, 2012, the group released a music video for "Permanent Revolution", which was filmed in South Korea and attempted to reflect a political message about Korean, Chinese and Japanese partnership. The single was released alongside the song Find the Light.

On April 20, 2013, World Order performed at the prestigious Nippon Budokan, which is generally used as an indoor arena to host martial arts competitions but has seen use by many musicians.

On June 17, 2013, a music video for "Imperialism" was released, with the introduction of Ryuta Tomita, replacing the departed Ryo Noguchi. On October 6, 2013, they released a music video for "Welcome to Tokyo", which was a remix of their debut song World Order. On December 7, 2013, they released a music video for "Last Dance".

On February 16, 2014, saw the music video release of "This is Life". On March 20, 2014, the music video for "Have a Nice Day" was released, which also featured appearances of AKB48 members. The music video saw World Order perform their choreography with AKB48 fans at AKB48's theatre stage as AKB48 was performing in front of them. On December 17, 2014, the band released their third album Have a Nice Day following the music video release of "Informal Empire", which included remixes of World Order, Machine Civilization and Aquarius. Imperialism was released as a single, but also packaged into the "Have a Nice Day" album.

In February 2015, World Order was featured in the 26th-season premiere of the CBS reality television show The Amazing Race. Teams had the opportunity to participate in a detour where they would attempt to mimic World Order's dance moves. The dance was set to the "Welcome to Tokyo" version of the song WORLD ORDER.

=== 2015–2019: Line-up changes, departures and new members ===
On March 13, 2015, saw the music video release of "The History of Voice 2015", which was a 6-member choreography without Genki Sudo to a shortened 2015 version of "The History of Voice". On July 27, 2015, the group had travelled to China as a 6-member unit for their "Multipolarity" music video, which featured a secret appearance by Genki Sudo in disguise.

In October 2015, Genki Sudo officially resigned from World Order, shortly following the release of "The Next Phase", as a dance member and lead vocalist, instead choosing to focus on being a director and producer for the group. This led to World Order continuing as a 6-member unit. However, he is still occasionally featured as a member of the group in their new content, despite his departure. Masato Ochiai and Akihiro Takahashi have been put forward as the vocalists of the group.

On February 27, 2016, two music videos of "Quiet Happiness" were released, one being set in China, and another in India. On May 31, 2016, a remix of Have a Nice Day was released as a music video, which included Genki Sudo as a performer and only vocalist.

As of 2016, the group has traveled to Tokyo, Kyoto, Yokohama, the United States, Mexico, South Korea, United Kingdom, France, Germany, China, and India to shoot their music videos.

On March 11, 2017, saw the release of "Singularity" on YouTube. The video featured a 14-person dance in collaboration with 7 other SKE48 members. The seven SKE48 members included were Yuna Ego, Ryoha Kitagawa, Ruka Kitano, Haruka Kumazaki, Sana Takatera, Yuzuki Hidaka and Chikako Matsumoto.

In August 2017, Masato Ochiai left the group due to poor physical condition, making the group a 5-member unit. This left Akihiro Takahashi as the sole lead vocalist of the group. Masato Ochiai later opened and became the instructor for Karatecise Tokyo, which is a combination of karate and dancing.

On September 7, 2017, World Order released a music video for "Find the Light" as a 5-member unit, which was recorded in Thailand. On November 29, 2017, "One Step Forward" was released.

On October 20, 2017, a brand new segment on World Order's YouTube channel began dubbed "WORLD ORDER (Almost) Weekly Journal", a video alternative to the diary, generally featuring all members who chat amongst themselves on camera. As the name suggests, a video journal is uploaded almost weekly. There have been some community translations provided to these videos.

In January 2018, Genki Sudo announced his return as a dance member of World Order, which returned the group to becoming a 6-member unit. On March 11, 2018, they released "Let's start WW3", which was a song about Donald Trump and filmed in the United States. World Order did not bring a cameracrew overseas, which led them to ask passersby on the streets to film for them. This led to someone running off with their camera, however, after a chase, they managed to get back the camera.

In June 2018, Takashi Jonishi announced his departure as a dance member of World Order. He has organized a new group named AirFootWorks specialized in a style called "Pull-Up Dance." Jonishi hopes that his group and World Order can perform together someday. He still cooperates with World Order behind the scenes as technical staff. Since then he has been featured as a member during World Order's two live events, WWIII of Love (directed by Akihiro) and their Osaka concert.

On October 9, 2018, a music video for Genki Sudo's 2015 single "Missing Beauty" was released with few altered lyrics, which was filmed in Taiwan. On January 25, 2019, they released "Big Brother". On April 18, 2019, they released "We Are All One", which was filmed in the Philippines.

In April 2019, 3 new members were officially announced following their Osaka concert, making the group a 7-member unit again. These new members consists of: Keisuke Kimura, Kosuke Shizunaga, Takuro Kakefuda. Kosuke and Takuro have also taken on the vocalist role, alongside concurrent member, Akihiro. With the news, it was also announced that Genki Sudo would return to the producer position. In May 2019, the group performed at the renowned Nagoya Blue Note, which was the performance debut of the three newly added members. With this new line-up, the group went on a fan tour from August 31–September 1.

In June 2019, Genki Sudo announced that he would enter politics. On August 1, Genki was elected into the Japanese House of Councillors, effectively stepping down as their producer and becoming an inactive member.

On August 16, 2019, World Order's management suspended their website's diary service due to administrative reasons. On August 22, World Order officially announced for their 10-year anniversary live concert to be held for 2-days during December in Tokyo from the 20th to 21st at the Kanda Myojin Hall, with two different show times for the Saturday performance. Tickets were released on October 12 and all 3 shows were eventually sold out.

On December 5, 2019, they returned with the new lineup and released "Exodus", which did not include any vocals. The music video has since been privated.

=== 2019–present: 10 year anniversary and change in operation ===
On December 20–21, 2019, their 10-year anniversary took place. With it came surprise appearances from both Masato and Genki, of which Masato participated in a few choreographies. He danced to Aquarius, replacing Shizu on break; and to Multipolarity, which was kept in 6-member formation as Takuro and Keisuke went for a break. It was revealed that Genki had initially retired from martial arts in order to become a politician, and that World Order was a way for him to convey his political message with music before reaching such goal.

On March 3, 2020, in an official announcement, World Order announced a change in their current operations. It is explained that its core members, who have worked on the project since its formation, have since expanded their individual activities into various fields – thus making it difficult to make a schedule together. As such, no members are leaving, nor is the group being disbanded, but future group activities will not have fixed members, but will instead have members 'on-call' for events. Although future activities are being planned, their schedules have been limited due to the COVID-19 pandemic.

On September 1, 2020, Akihiro Takahashi announced his departure from the group after 10 years of performing with World Order.

On September 8, 2020, Takuro Kakefuda announced his departure from the group after joining for around a year and a half.

On December 2, 2020, the single "Let's Start WW3" was released online. It contained songs Let's Start WW3, Big Brother, and a repackaged Singularity.

On September 11, 2021, Genki Sudo announced the release of a new music video for their latest release, Censorship, effectively ending their inactivity. Genki Sudo and Takashi Jonishi were present in the music video, instead of Keisuke Kimura and Kosuke Shizunaga, due to scheduling conflicts.

On April 9, 2025, Genki Sudo announced a comeback, and on April 12, 2025, World Order posted a new song, Neo Samurai, to their YouTube channel following three years of dormancy. The music video showcased a return to a 7-man lineup, including Takashi Jonishi and Akihiro Takahashi, both of whom had previously left the group.

On October 23, 2025, World Order travelled to Dubai to perform at the Quintet 5 Grappling Team Survival Match half-time show. A month later, World Order uploaded a video from Dubai regarding the event.

On September 1, 2026, World Order released Beautiful World as 6 member group, in collaboration with the Science Fiction Megane Theatre Company.

== Members ==
World Order maintains a line-up of 7-members during their performances and music videos. Despite various members announcing their departures or leaving the group, some have continued to participate in group activities, as seen in music videos and live events. The line-up is not locked, but usually preserves Genki Sudo as the center.

=== Current members ===
- Genki Sudo (須藤 元気) – leader, director, producer, main vocalist, lyricist
- Yusuke Morisawa (森澤 祐介)
- Hayato Uchiyama (内山 隼人)
- Masato Ochiai (落合 将人) – vocalist, choreographer
- Akihiro Takahashi (高橋 昭博) – vocalist, lyricist
- Takashi Jonishi (上西 隆史) – art director, choreographer
- Ryuta Tomita (富田 竜太)
- Keisuke Kimura (木村 圭佑) – choreographer
- Kosuke Shizunaga (静永 紘介) – vocalist

=== Former members ===
- Kiyoyuki Sakiyama (崎山 清之)
- Ryo Noguchi (野口 量) – choreographer
- Takuro Kakefuda (掛札 拓郎) – vocalist

== Discography ==
=== World Order ===
Released: July 7, 2010

Publisher: P-Vine Records

No.	Title	Length
1.	"World Order"	4:30
2.	"Mind Shift"	4:58
3.	"A Brave New World"	5:17
4.	"Boy Meets Girl"	5:02
5.	"Blue Boundary"	4:39
6.	"Love and Everything"	5:01
Total length:		29:27

DVD
No.	Title	Length
1.	"World Order"	4:52
2.	"Mind Shift"	5:12
3.	"Boy Meets Girl"	4:42
Total length:		14:46

=== 2012 ===
Released: June 20, 2012

Publisher: Pony Canyon

No.	Title	Writer(s)	Length
1.	"The History of Voice"	Genki Sudo, Takashi Watanabe	4:45
2.	"2012"	Genki Sudo, Takashi Watanabe, Yu Imai	4:36
3.	"Machine Civilization"	Genki Sudo, Takashi Watanabe	5:31
4.	"Hello Atlantis"	Genki Sudo, Takashi Watanabe, HND	4:31
5.	"Change Your Life"	Genki Sudo, Takashi Watanabe	3:54
6.	"Aquarius"	Genki Sudo, Ice Bach	4:14
7.	"World Order" (Tax Haven Remix)	Genki Sudo, Space Walker, Wall5	4:18
Total length:			31:49

Blu-ray/DVD
No.	Title	Length
1.	"The History of Voice"	4:39
2.	"2012"	4:36
3.	"Machine Civilization"	5:40
4.	"Change Your Life"	4:03
5.	"Aquarius"	4:23
Total length:		23:21

=== Find the Light/Permanent Revolution ===
Released: November 28, 2012

Publisher: Pony Canyon

No.	Title	Writer(s)	Length
1.	"Find the Light"	Genki Sudo, Yu Imai	4:27
2.	"Permanent Revolution"	Genki Sudo, Space Walker	3:56
3.	"Find the Light" (Remix)	Genki Sudo, Yu Imai	4:09
4.	"Permanent Revolution" (Remix)	Genki Sudo, Space Walker	3:58
Total length:			16:30

DVD
No.	Title	Length
1.	"Permanent Revolution"	3:56
2.	"Permanent Revolution" (Asiana Special Version)	3:56
3.	"洋服の青山 - Making of Commercial"

=== Genki Sudo Presents: World Order in Budokan ===
Released: August 7, 2013

Publisher: Pony Canyon

Blu-ray/DVD
No.	Title	Length
1.	"Overture"
2.	"Noise ~ The History of Voice"
3.	"World Order"
4.	"Circle"
5.	"Permanent Revolution"
6.	"Change Your Life"
7.	"Solo"
8.	"A Brave New World"
9.	"Cross"
10.	"Muon"
11.	"Find the Light ~ Blue Boundary"
12.	"Intermission"
13.	"Mind Shift"
14.	"Be Man Machine"
15.	"Machine Civilization"
16.	"Aquarius"
17.	"2012"

=== Have a Nice Day ===
Released: December 17, 2014

Publisher: Pony Canyon

No.	Title	Length
1.	"Imperialism"	5:34
2.	"Last Dance"	4:19
3.	"This Is Life"	4:10
4.	"Have a Nice Day"	4:02
5.	"Informal Empire"	5:19
6.	"World Order" (Welcome to Tokyo Remix)	4:30
7.	"Machine Civilization" (Inner Child Remix)	5:59
8.	"Aquarius" (3.8 Remix)	4:48
Total length:		38:41

Blu-ray/DVD
No.	Title	Writer(s)	Length
1.	"Have a Nice Day"	Genki Sudo	4:02
2.	"Informal Empire"	Genki Sudo, Takashi Watanabe	5:19
3.	"Last Dance"	Genki Sudo, Takashi Watanabe	4:19
4.	"This Is Life"	Genki Sudo, Takashi Watanabe	4:10
5.	"Welcome to Tokyo"	Genki Sudo, Takashi Watanabe, Mariko Nanba, TakatsuguShimazu, Wall5	4:30
6.	"Imperialism"	Genki Sudo, Takashi Watanabe	5:34
Total length:			27:54

On the Road Around Japan: 2014 Zepp Tour
No.	Title	Length
1.	"Imperialism"
2.	"Permanent Revolution"
3.	"Find the Light"
4.	"Change Your Life"
5.	"A Brave New World"
6.	"Blue Boundary"
7.	"Mind Shift"
8.	"Aquarius"
9.	"2012"
10.	"Last Dance"
11.	"World Order"
12.	"Machine Civilization"

=== World Order Performance Video Collection ===
Released: August 31, 2017

Publisher: Pony Canyon

No.	Title	Length
1.	"History of Voice 2015"	2:05
2.	"Multipolarity"	3:32
3.	"The Next Phase"	4:45
4.	"Quiet Happiness"	3:31
5.	"Have a Nice Day" (Shibuya Ver.)	2:10
6.	"Singularity"	4:20
Total length:		20:23

Blu-ray
No.	Title	Length
1.	"History of Voice 2015"	2:08
2.	"Multipolarity"	4:21
3.	"The Next Phase"	4:53
4.	"Quiet Happiness" (Filmed in China)	3:32
5.	"Quiet Happiness" (Filmed in India)	3:33
6.	"Have a Nice Day" (Shibuya Ver.)	2:06
7.	"Singularity" (Featuring SKE48)	5:08
Total length:		25:41

=== Let's Start WW3 ===
Released: December 2, 2020

No.	Title	Writer(s)	Length
1.	"Let's Start WW3"	Genki Sudo, TAKU	3:50
2.	"Big Brother"	Genki Sudo, Mine Chang	3:08
3.	"Singularity"	Genki Sudo, JUN, Mine Chang	4:31
Total length:			11:29

=== Censorship ===
Released: September 11, 2021

No.	Title	Writer(s)	Length
1.	"Censorship"	Genki Sudo, Ryo Shimamoto, Takashi Watanabe	4:14
Total length:			4:14

=== Neo Samurai ===
Released: April 12, 2025

No.	Title	Writer(s)	Length
1.	"Neo Samurai"	Genki Sudo, Takashi Watanabe	3:18
Total length:			3:18
