= Erindi Private Game Reserve =

Game reserve in central Namibia

Erindi Private Game Reserve, located in central Namibia between Okahandja and Omaruru, is a privately owned protected wildlife reserve. Covering 65,000 ha (160,000 acres) or 75,000 ha (190,000 acres), Erindi was originally a collection of three adjacent cattle farms that were converted into a wildlife reserve in the 1990s.

== History ==
The name Erindi is derived from the local Herero language, meaning place of water.

In 1986, South African citizens Chris Joubert and his brother Gert Joubert purchased land from the Imperial Cold Storage and Supply Company (ICS) with the initial intention of running a cattle farm. Recognizing low profitability, they introduced game to the farm in the early 1990s. To avoid competition with cattle, plain game species were introduced. In 1992, they fenced off 3,000 hectares (7,400 acres) and introduced 55 giraffes to the reserve. The reserve is home to various rare and endangered species and has about 20000 animals.

Since 2013 the Joubert brothers tried to sell the private game reserve. The sale was controversial because land sales to foreigners require approval from the Ministry of Land Reform, and a Land Conference in 2018 resolved not to allow such sales at all. The sale to Mexican billionaire Alberto Baillères was eventually approved in 2019. The asking price was between 1.1 and 2 billion N$.

== Geography ==
Erindi comprises approximately 65,000 hectares and includes the farms Erindi, Constantia, and Otjimukara. Situated on a central plateau in Namibia’s highlands, the terrain consists of eroded soils from adjacent mountains. The Erongo Mountains in the west are associated with the Post-Karoo Complex and are characterized by granite, basalt, and volcanic rocks. The Omataku Mountains in the east are inselbergs composed of Etjo sandstone and magmatic rock.

The reserve is intersected by two perennial rivers: the Slang River to the south and the Otjimakuru River to the north. Summers are long, hot, and partly cloudy, while winters are short, cool, windy, and clear. The region experiences dry conditions.

== Accommodation ==
Erindi Game Reserve hosts the Old Traders Lodge, including luxury rooms.

== Gallery ==
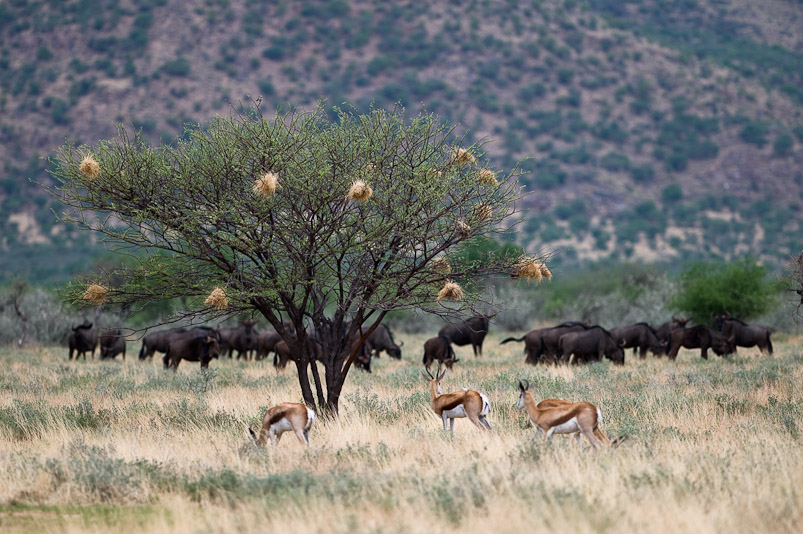
Erindi animals

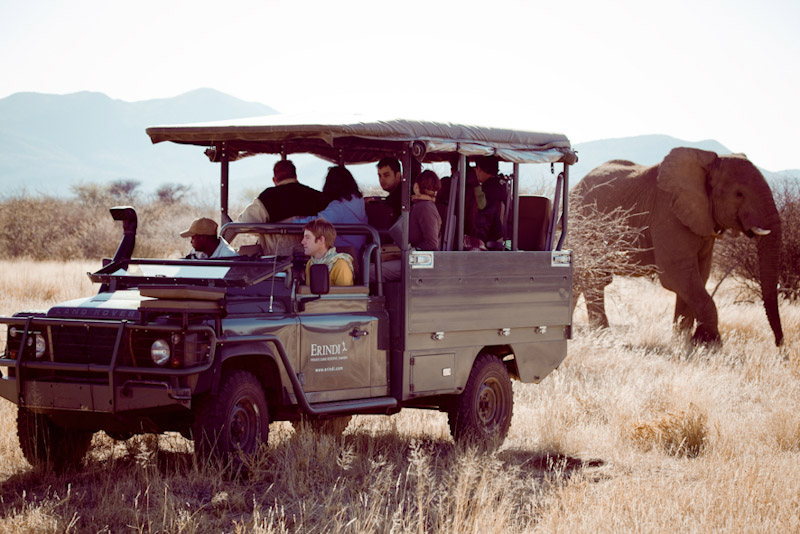
Game drives on Erindi
