= Sri Panwa Phuket =

Weekend house project

Coordinates: 7.8019°N 98.4110°E

Sri panwa
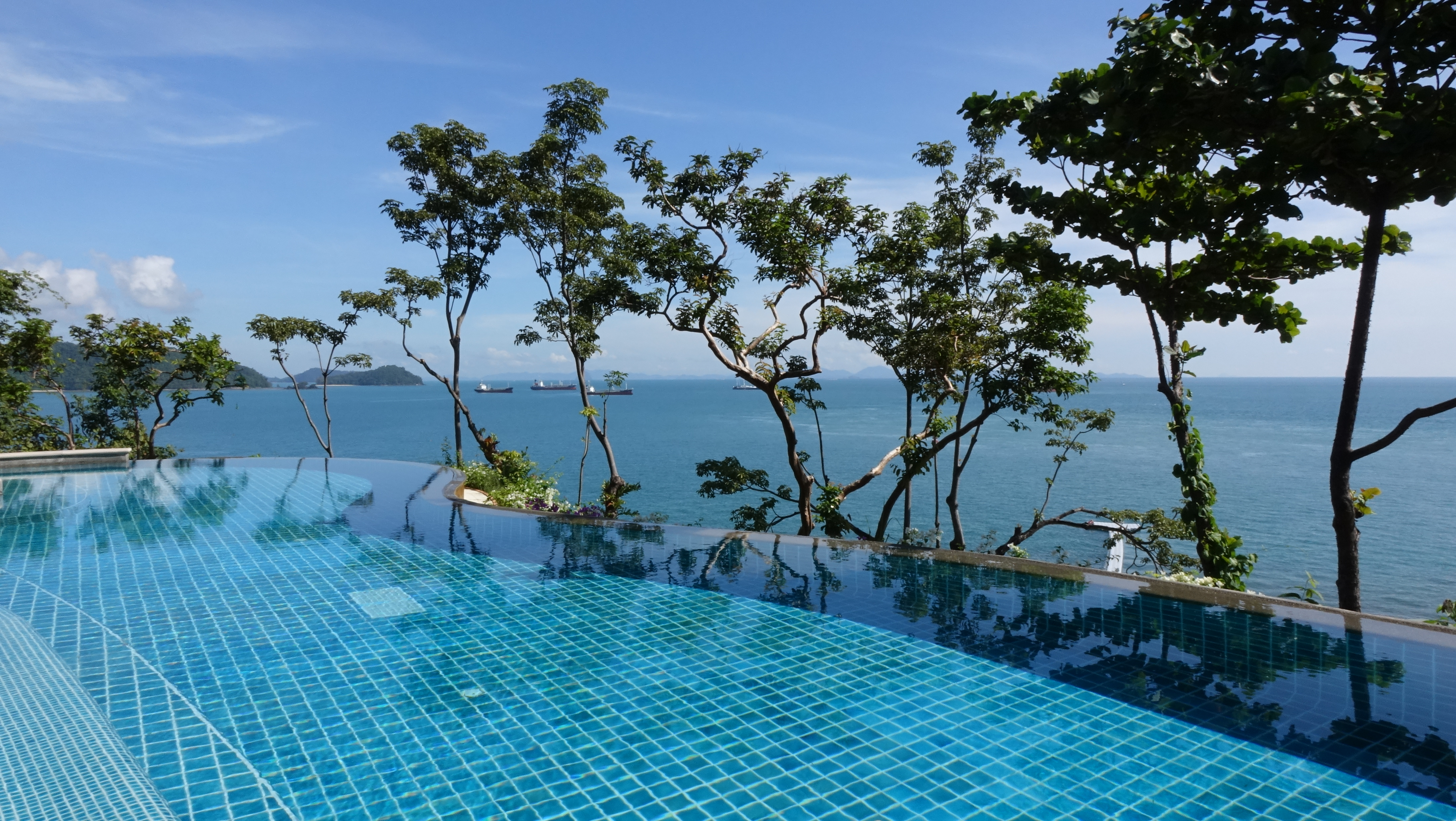
- Sri Panwa Phuket, Vichit, Thailand.
- Industry: Hotel, Luxury hotel
- Founded: 2551
- Key people: Vorasit "Wan" lssara, managing director
- Products: Luxury pool villa hotel Phuket
- Parent: Charn Issara residence
- Website: www.sripanwa.com

Sri Panwa Phuket is a weekend house project and a five star luxury hotel with Pool Villa Style by using contemporary tropical design located on the tip of Panwa cape, southeastern part of Phuket Island.
